= Baron Raimund von Stillfried =

Yokohama photographer

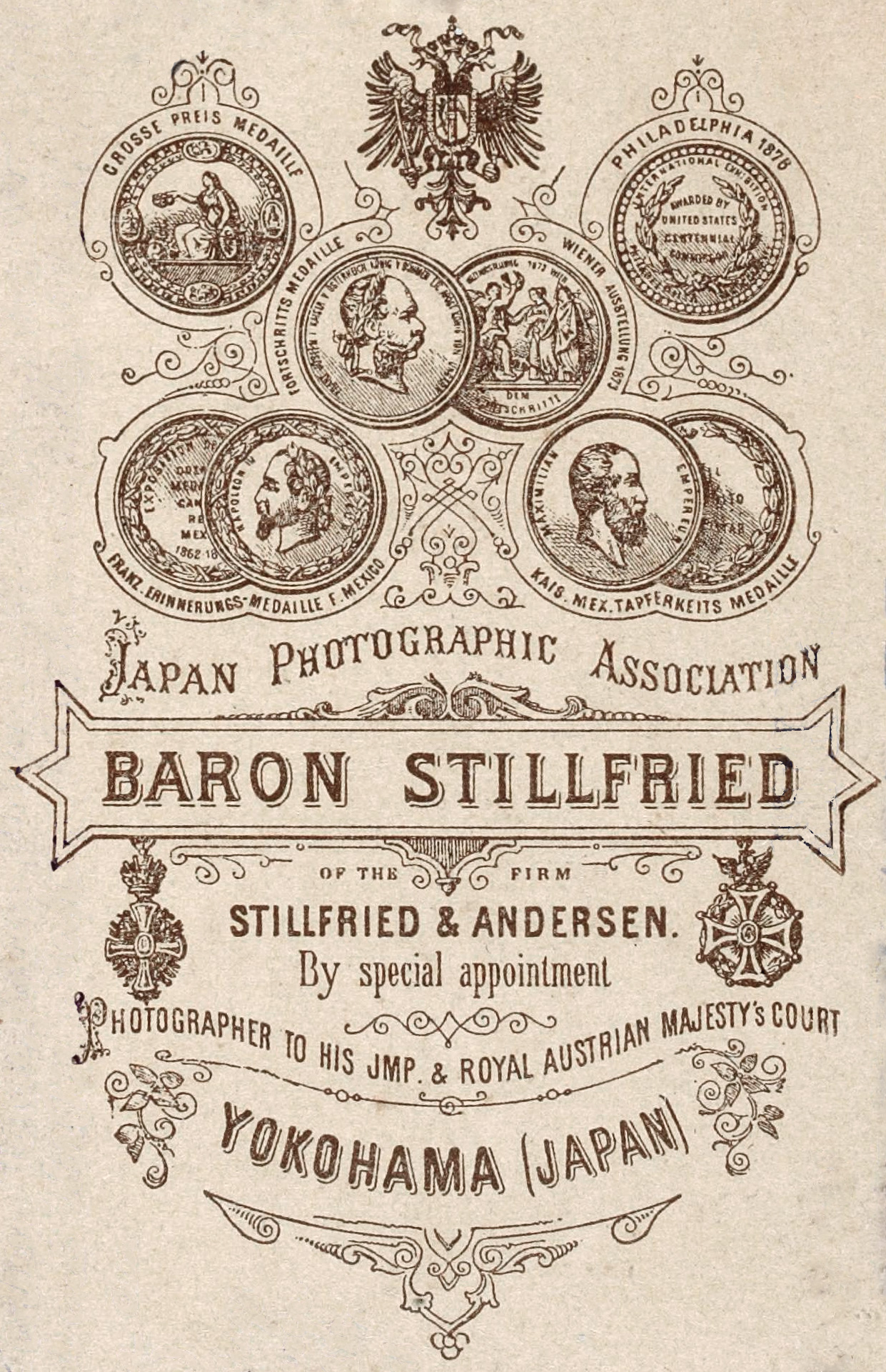

Baron Raimund von Stillfried, also known as Baron Raimund von Stillfried-Rathenitz (6 August 1839, in Komotau, Bohemia – 12 August 1911, in Vienna, Austrian-Hungarian Empire), was an Austrian military officer and early professional photographer in Japan. His historical photographs of Japan following the end of the Tokugawa shogunate in the 1870s have been appreciated for their documentary and artistic value and collected in international archives.

== Biography ==
He was the son of Baron (Freiherr) August Wilhelm Stillfried von Rathenitz (d. 1806) and Countess Maria Anna Johanna Theresia Walburge Clam-Martinitz (1802–1874).

During his training at the Imperial Marine Academy, he also studied painting. After leaving his military career, Stillfried traveled to South America and China, and on to Yokohama, Japan, in 1864. In 1871, he opened a photographic studio called Stillfried & Co., which operated until 1875. The same year, Stillfried formed a partnership with Hermann Andersen and the studio was renamed, Stillfried & Andersen (also known as the Japan Photographic Association). This studio operated until 1885. In 1877, Stillfried & Andersen had bought the studio and stock of Felice Beato, for whom he had worked at the beginning of his career. During a trip overseas in the late 1870s, Stillfried also visited and photographed in Dalmatia, Bosnia, and Greece.

Similar to Felice Beato, Stillfried was one of the leading photographers in Japan during the 1870s. He is known for his portrait photography and, like Felice Beato, also made numerous genre and landscape photographs. Such images, which showed carefully staged genre scenes with people from foreign cultures as well as pictures of trips to regions and sights formerly unknown outside of Japan, were popular souvenirs for foreign residents or visitors. These images, often produced in high numbers and as hand-coloured albumen prints, have become rare and valuable over time.

For the 1873 Vienna World Exposition, the government of Japan commissioned Stillfried to travel to Hokkaido, where he took photographs documenting the process of the country's modernization, as well as of ethnic Ainu people. According to a review of a monographic book on his life and work, "Stillfried came to Japan just as it was opening to trade, tourism, and Western influences. And with the collapse of the Tokugawa shogunate, the new imperial government was figuring out how best to represent itself as a modern nation through photography, and Stillfried was well positioned to assist."

In addition to his own photographic activities, Stillfried trained many Japanese photographers. In 1876, he sold the larger part of his stock to his protégé, the Japanese photographer Kusakabe Kimbei, and left Japan forever in 1881. After travelling to Vladivostok, Hong Kong and Bangkok, he eventually settled in Vienna in 1883. There, he also received an Imperial and Royal Warrant of Appointment as photographer (k.u.k. Hof-Photograph).

Stillfried's photographs are presented online by the Nagasaki University Library, the Canadian Centre for Architecture, as well as the J. Paul Getty Museum, and some of his photographic work as well as his watercolour paintings are in the collection of the Musée Guimet of Asian Arts in Paris.

== Selected works ==
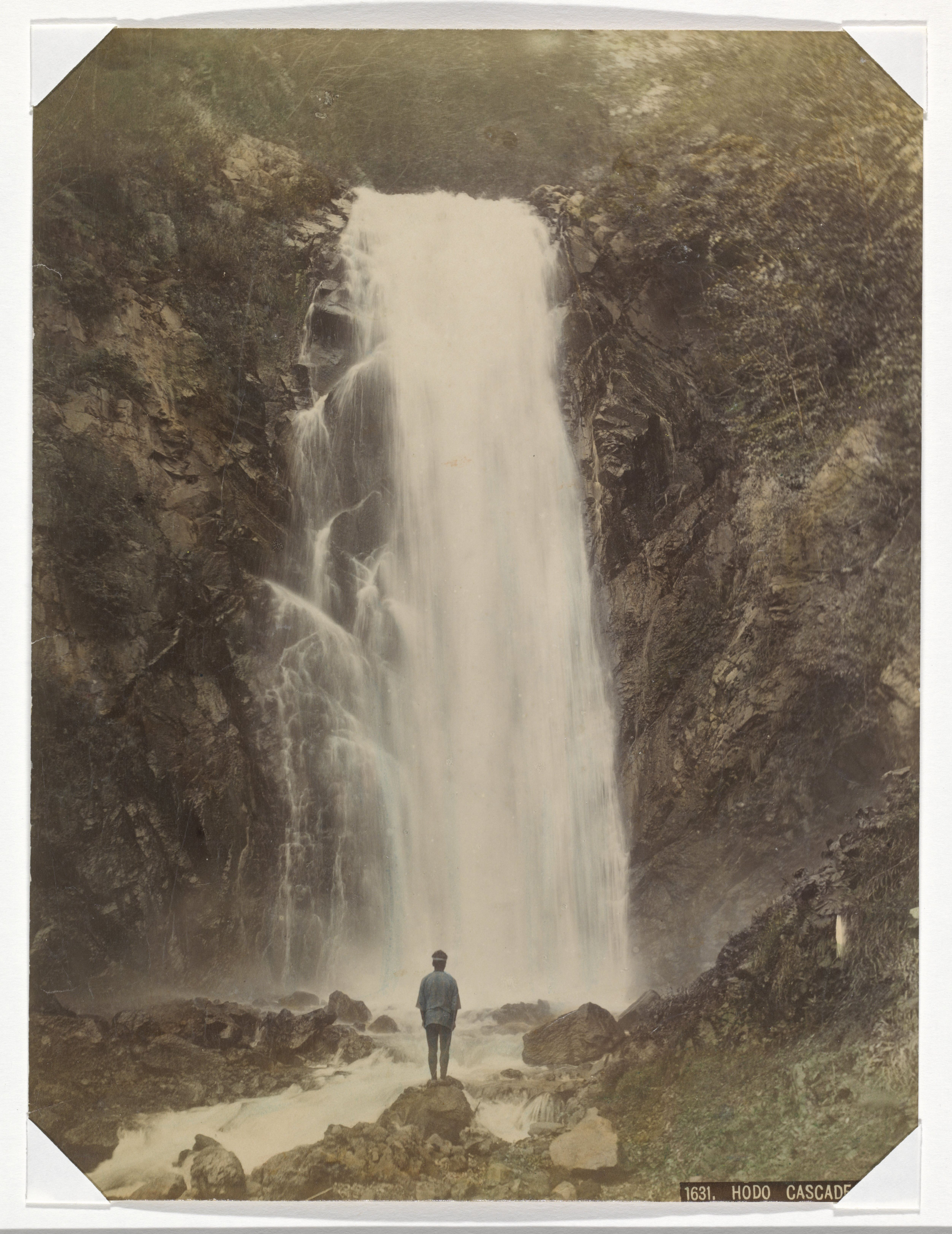

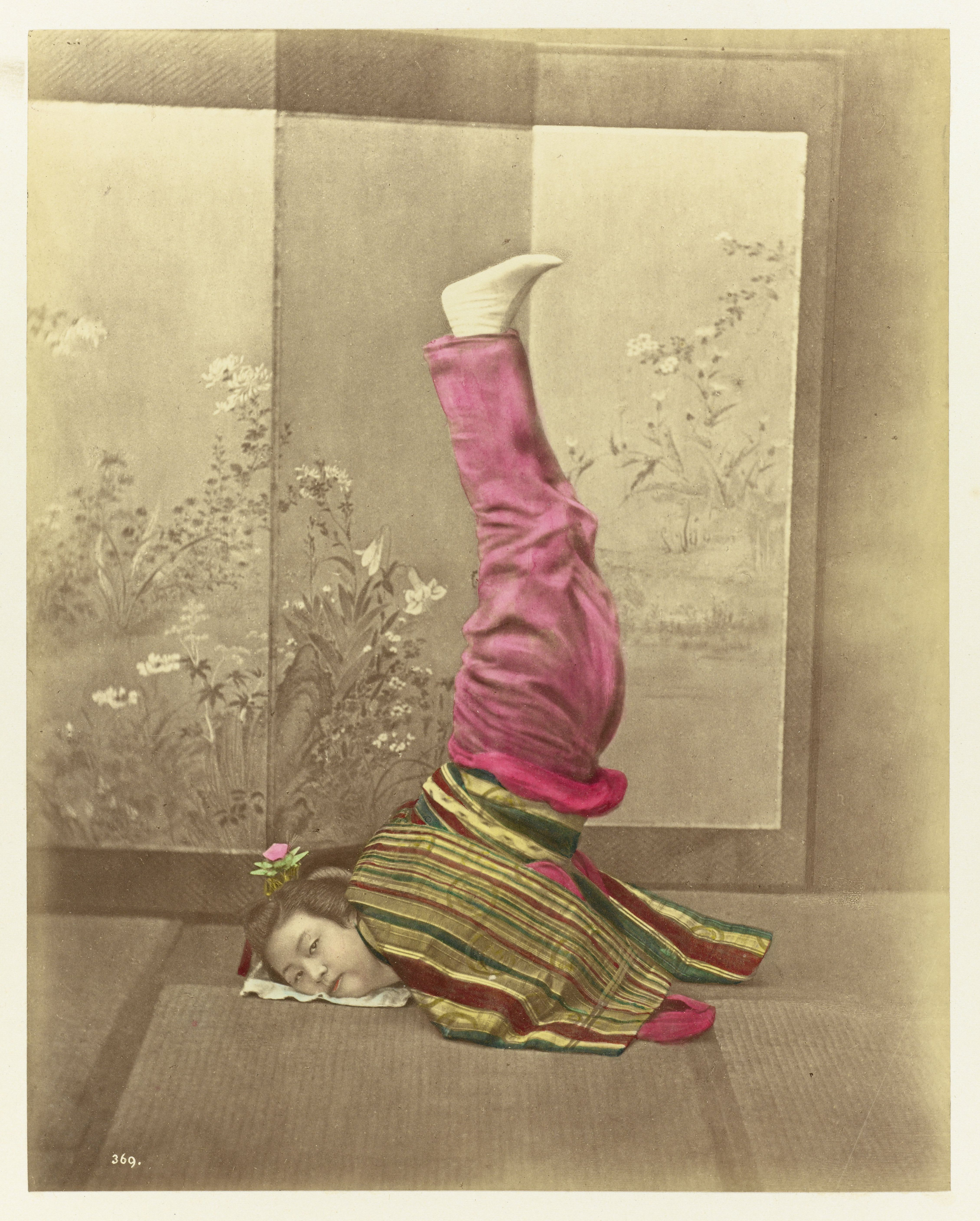

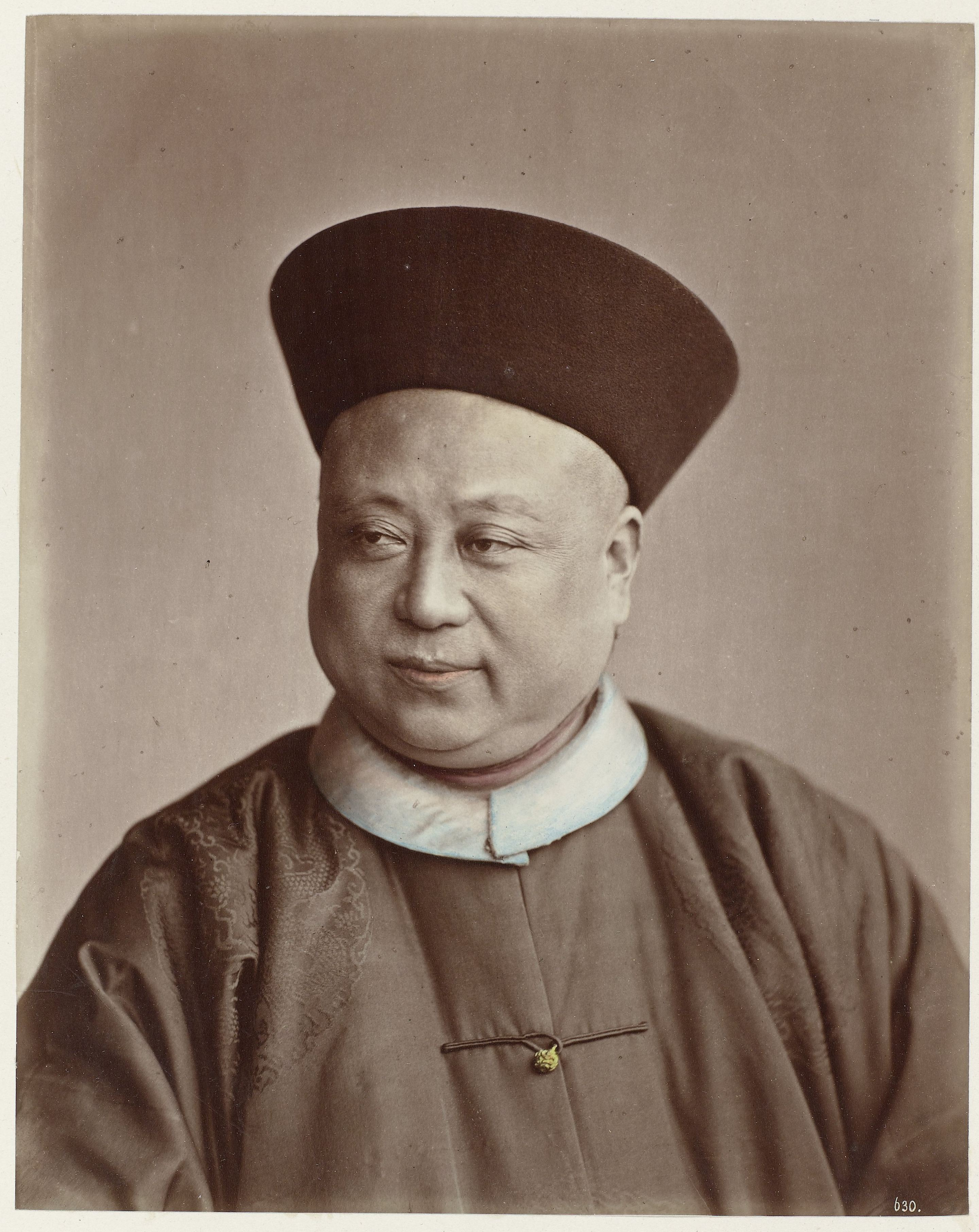

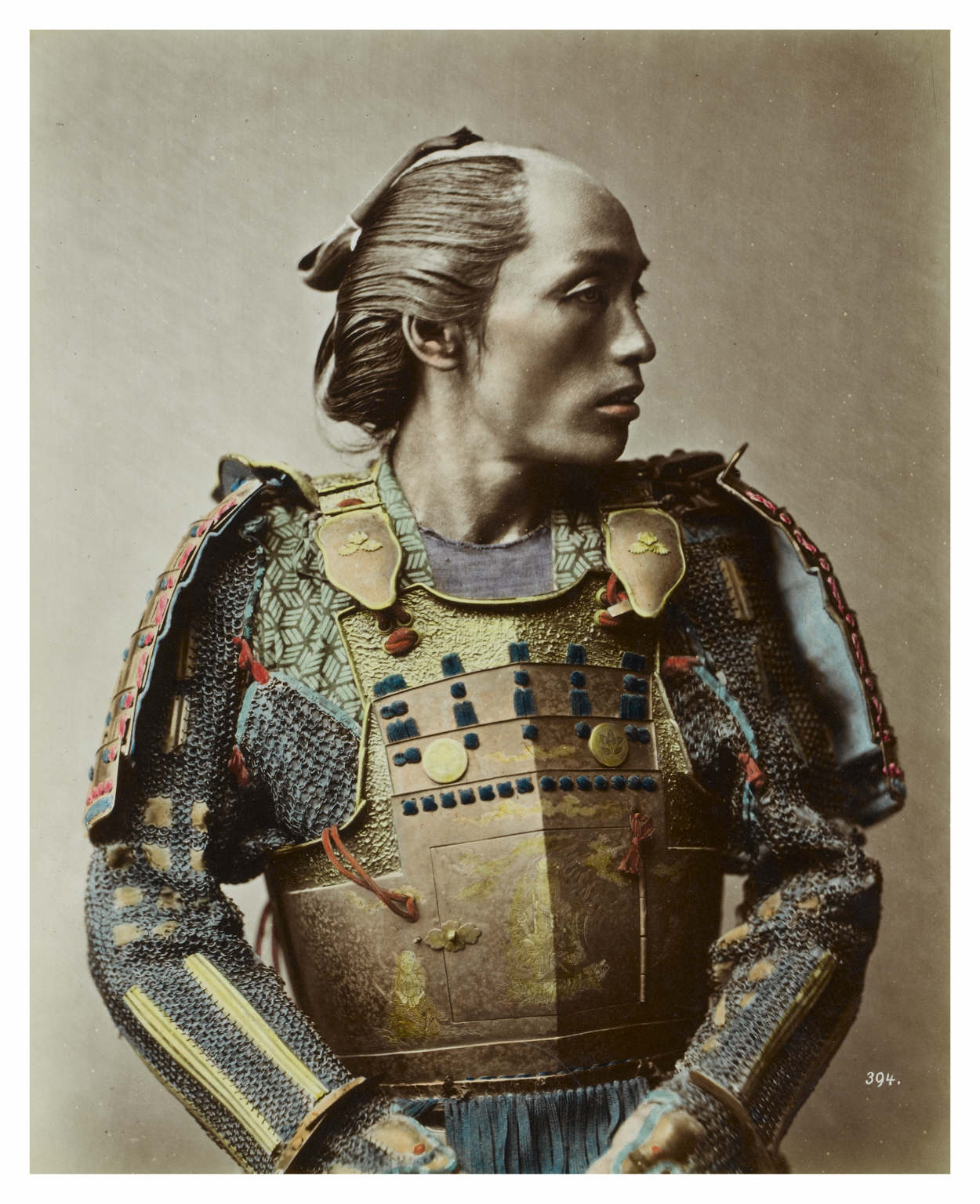

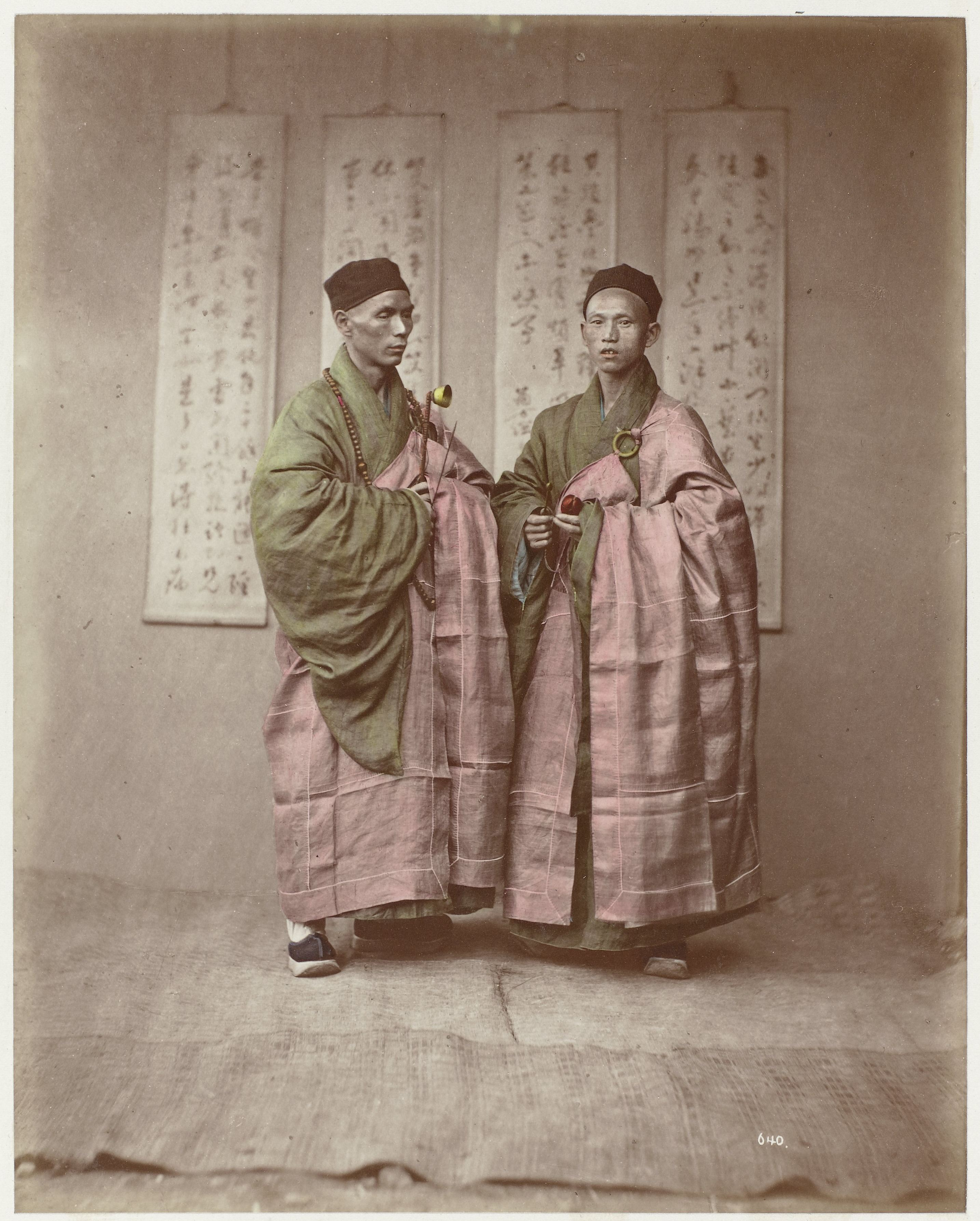

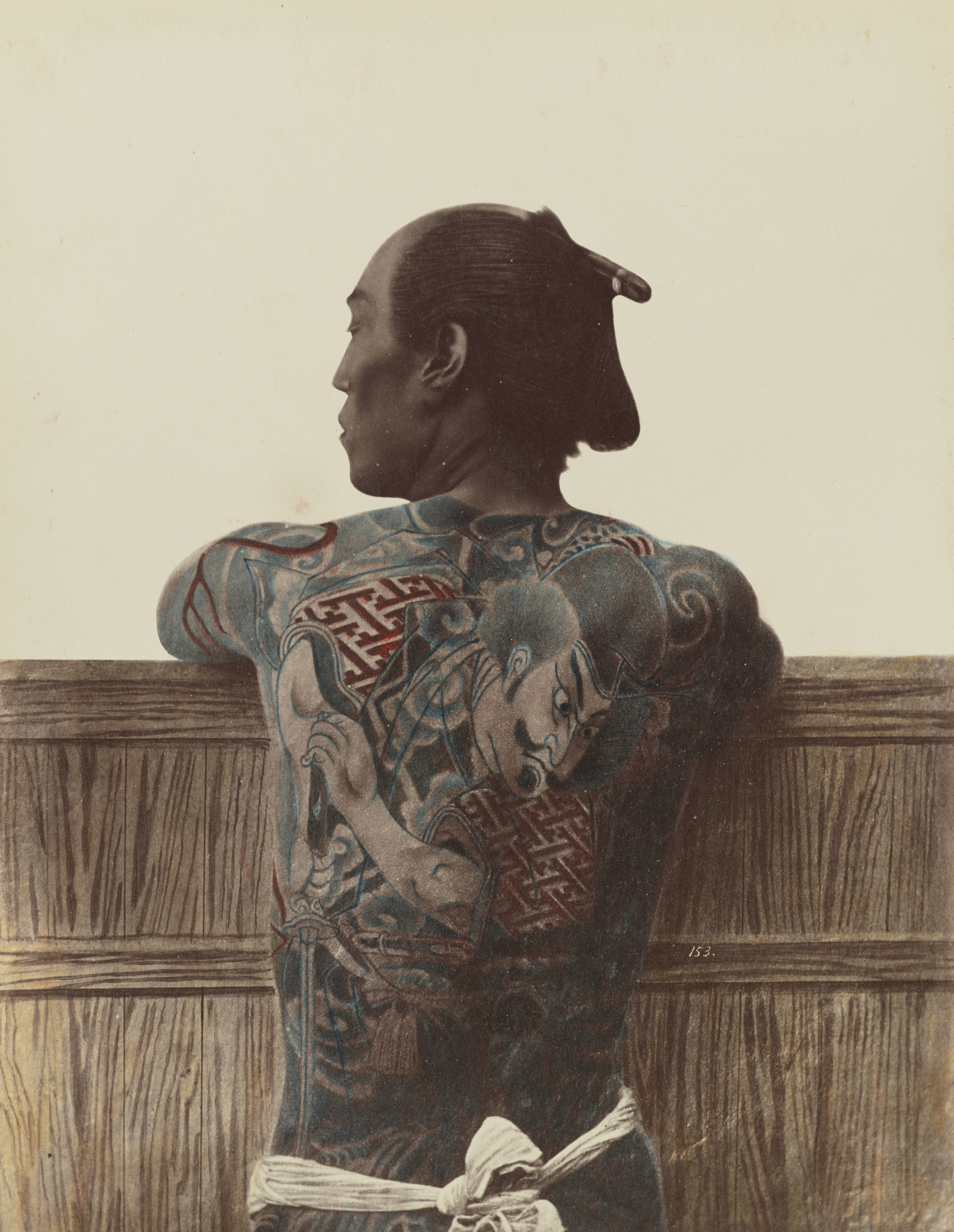

== See also ==
- History of photography 1850-1900
- Felice Beato
- Wilhelm J. Burger
- Sakoku

== Literature ==
- Gartlan, Luke. A Career of Japan: Baron Raimund von Stillfried and Early Yokohama Photography. Brill: Photography in Asia, Vol 1. Leiden and Boston: Brill, 2016, 384 pp., 163 illus. ISBN 978-90-04-28932-1.
- Nagasaki University Library; Japanese Old Photographs in Bakumatsu-Meiji Period, s.v. "Stillfried". Accessed 12 February 2007.
- Union List of Artists Names, s.v. "Stillfried-Rathenitz, Raimund von, Baron". Accessed 11 December 2006.
