= Tinted photograph =

Tinted photograph is a photograph produced on dyed printing papers produced by commercial manufacturers or a hand-colored photograph. A single overall colour underlies the images printed on dyed photographic papers and is most apparent in the highlights and mid-tones. From the 1870s albumen printing papers were available in pale pink or blue and from the 1890s gelatin silver printing-out papers in pale mauve or pink were available. There were other kinds of tinted papers. Over time such colouration often becomes very faded.The paper is also used to highlight the important thing or part on it.

== Other meanings ==
Tinted photograph is also one of a number of names for a hand-colored photograph, i.e. a black-and-white photographic print to which color has been added by hand. Other names are hand-painted photograph and hand-tinted photograph.

== See also ==
- Photochrom
- Hand-colouring
