= Felice Beato =

Italian–British photographer (c.1832–1909)

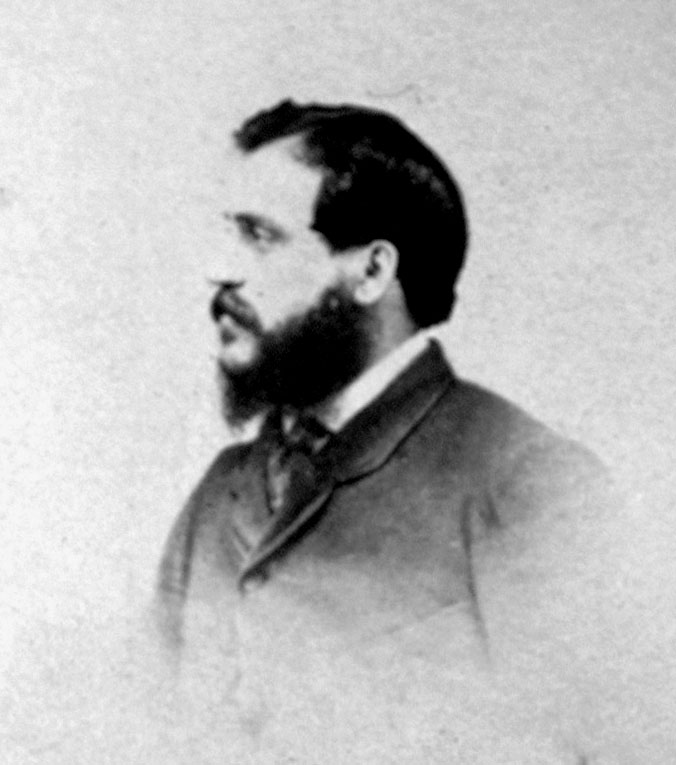
- Beato, c. 1866
- Born: c. 1832; Venice (or Corfu), Kingdom of Lombardy–Venetia, Austrian Empire
- Died: 29 January 1909 (aged about 76); Florence, Kingdom of Italy
- Other name: Felix Beato
- Citizenship: Italy; United Kingdom
- Occupation: Photographer
- Known for: One of the first people to take photographs in East Asia and one of the first war photographers
- Relatives: Antonio Beato (brother)

Felice Beato (c. 1832 – 29 January 1909), also known as Felix Beato, (Note: It appears Felice was his original name. However, he much preferred Felix. During his lifetime he was often referred to in print as "Signor Beato", and his surname was often misspelt ("Beat", "Beatto", etc.).) was an Italian–British photographer. He was one of the first people to take photographs in East Asia and one of the first war photographers as well as a pioneer of travel photography. He is noted for his genre works, portraits, and views and panoramas of the architecture and landscapes of Asia and the Mediterranean region. Beato's travels gave him opportunities to create images of countries, people, and events unfamiliar and remote to most people in Europe and North America. His works provide images of such events as the Indian Rebellion of 1857 and the Second Opium War, and represent the first substantial body of photojournalism. He influenced other photographers; and his impact in Japan, where he taught and worked with numerous other photographers and artists, was particularly deep and lasting.

== Early life and identity ==
The Beato family was one of the noble Venetian families who ruled the island of Corfu during the era of the Republic of Venice. In the 20th century, Felice Beato was considered an Italian Corfiot. A death certificate discovered in 2009 states Beato was born in Venice in 1832. However, recent scholarship uncovered an application by Beato for a travel permit in 1858 that included information suggesting he was born in 1833 or 1834 on the island of Corfu. It is likely that early in his life Beato and his family moved to Corfu, at the time part of the British protectorate of the Ionian Islands, and so Beato was a British subject. His death certificate confirms he was a British subject and a bachelor.

Beato has long been described as British, Italian, Corfiot Italian, and/or Greek. The movements of his family and of early nineteenth-century history in the Adriatic mean that he can justifiably be described by all these terms. Corfu was on and off part of Venetian territory from 1386 until 1815, when the Treaty of Paris placed it and the other Ionian Islands under British protection. Corfu was ceded to Greece in 1864. A line of the Beato family is recorded as having moved to Corfu in the 17th century and was one of the noble Venetian families who ruled the island during the Republic of Venice.

Because of the existence of a number of photographs signed "Felice Antonio Beato" and "Felice A. Beato", it was long assumed there was one photographer who somehow photographed at the same time in places as distant as Egypt and Japan. By 1983 it was known there were actually two brothers, Felice Beato and Antonio Beato, who sometimes worked together, sharing a signature.

== Mediterranean, the Crimea and India ==
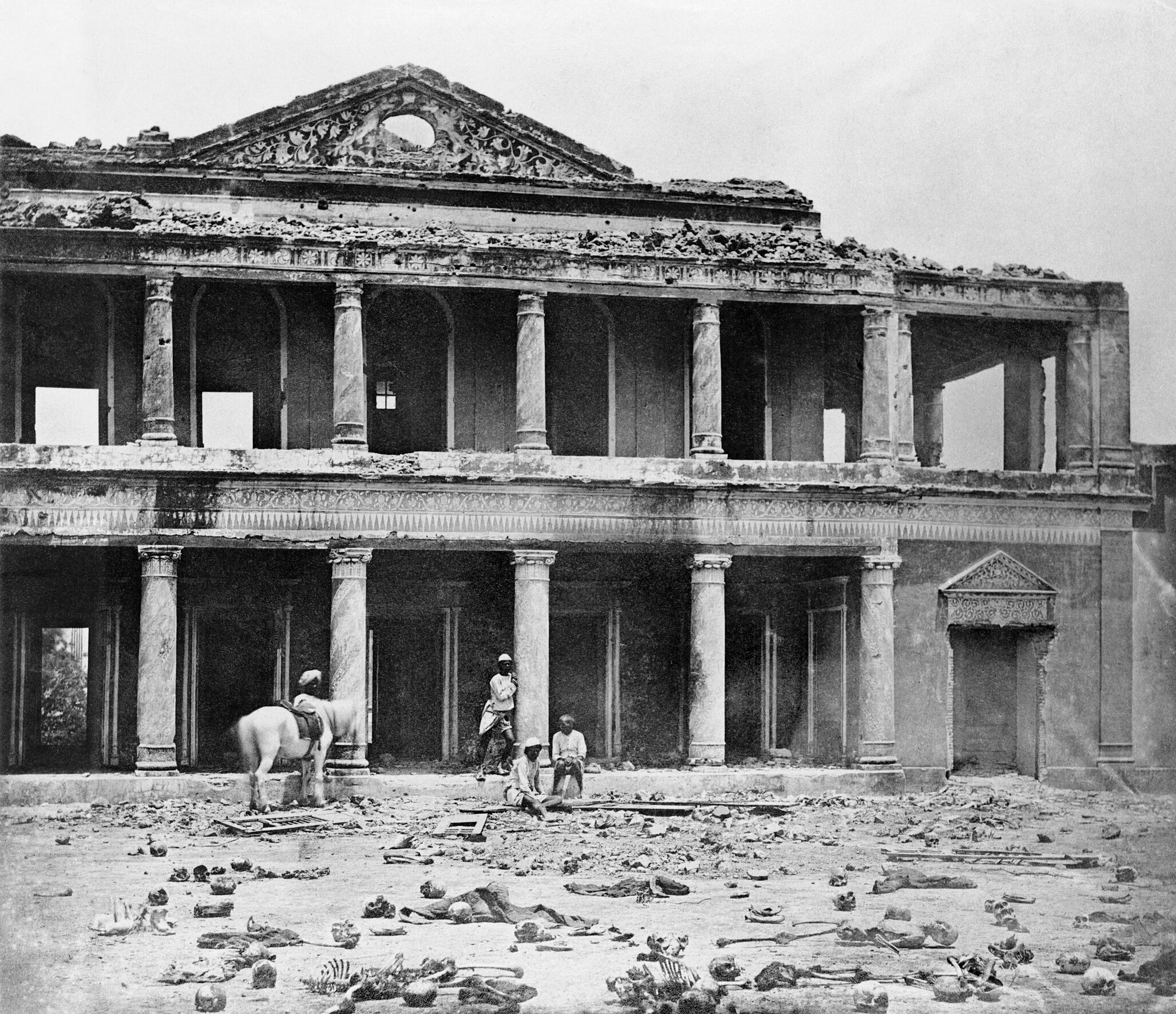
The ruins of Sikandar Bagh palace showing the skeletal remains of rebels in the foreground, Lucknow, India, 1858

Little is certain about Felice Beato's early development as a photographer, though it is said he bought his first and only lens in Paris in 1851. He probably met the British photographer James Robertson in Malta in 1850 and accompanied him to Constantinople in 1851. Superintendent of the Imperial Mint, Robertson opened one of the first commercial photography studios in the capital between 1854 and 1856. He had been an engraver at the Imperial Ottoman Mint since 1843 and had probably taken up photography in the 1840s. In 1853 the two began photographing together and they formed a partnership called "Robertson & Beato" either in that year or in 1854 when Robertson opened a photographic studio in Pera, Constantinople. The pair were joined by Beato's brother Antonio on photographic expeditions to Malta in 1854 or 1856 and to Greece and Jerusalem in 1857. A number of the firm's photographs produced in the 1850s are signed "Robertson, Beato and Co.", and it is believed the "and Co." refers to Antonio.

In late 1854 or early 1855, James Robertson married Beato's sister, Leonilda Maria Matilda Beato. They had three daughters, Catherine Grace (b. 1856), Edith Marcon Vergence (b. 1859), and Helen Beatruc (b. 1861). In 1855 Felice Beato and Robertson travelled to Balaklava, Crimea, where they took over reportage of the Crimean War following Roger Fenton's departure. Beato was ostensibly Robertson's assistant, however, the unpredictable conditions of a war zone forced Beato to assume a more active role. In contrast to Fenton's depiction of the dignified aspects of war, Beato and Robertson showed the destruction and death. They photographed the fall of Sevastopol in September 1855, producing about 60 images. Their Crimean images dramatically changed the way war was reported and depicted.

In February 1858 Beato arrived in Calcutta and began travelling throughout Northern India to document the aftermath of the Indian Rebellion of 1857. (Note: Gernsheim states Beato and Robertson both travelled to India in 1857; and as recently as 1996 it was claimed "in 1858 Felice and Robertson documented the massacres carried out by the British army following the Lucknow revolt". However, it is known Robertson sometimes took even sole credit for photographs taken by Felice Beato alone; and: "Exhibitions of the Lucknow photographs at the British Association in Leeds in October 1858 and at the Photographic Society in London in February 1859 cited Robertson as the photographer or co-photographer, but beyond this, there is no hard evidence that Robertson went to India with Beato." Thus it is now generally accepted Robertson did not accompany him.) During this time he produced possibly the first-ever photographic images of corpses. It is believed that for at least one of his photographs taken at the palace of Sikandar Bagh in Lucknow, he had the skeletal remains of Indian rebels disinterred or rearranged to heighten the photograph's dramatic impact, as seen at the events at Taku Forts. He was also in the cities of Delhi, Cawnpore, Meerut, Benares, Amritsar, Agra, Simla, and Lahore. Beato was joined in July 1858 by his brother Antonio, who later left India, probably for health reasons, in December 1859. Antonio ended up in Egypt in 1860, setting up a photographic studio in Thebes in 1862.

== China ==
In 1860 Beato left the partnership of Robertson & Beato, though Robertson continued to use the name until 1867. Beato was sent from India to photograph the Anglo-French military expedition to China in the Second Opium War. He arrived in Hong Kong in March, and immediately began photographing the city and its surroundings as far as Canton. Beato's photographs are some of the earliest taken in China.

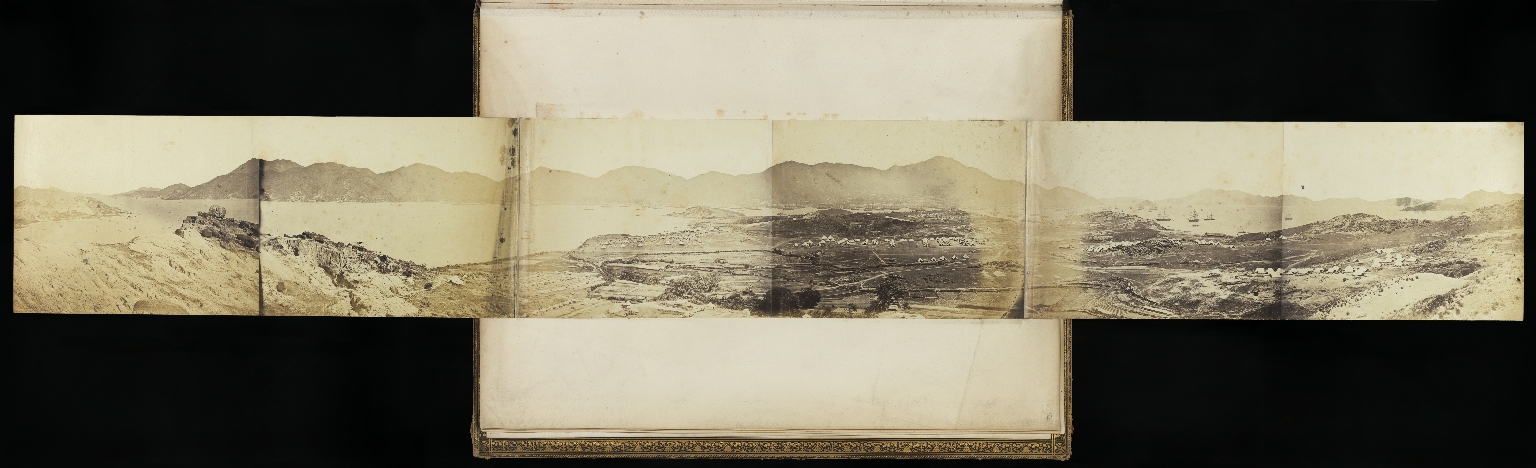
Felice Beato, 1st arrival of Chinese expeditionary Force encampment, Kowloon, Hong Kong, March 1860

While in Hong Kong, Beato met Charles Wirgman, an artist and correspondent for the Illustrated London News. The two accompanied the Anglo-French forces travelling north to Talien Bay, then to Pehtang and the Taku Forts at the mouth of the Peiho, and on to Peking and Qingyi Yuan, the suburban Summer Palace. For places on this route and later in Japan, Wirgman's (and others') illustrations for the Illustrated London News were often derived from Beato's photographs. (Note: For an anthology of the illustrations (as well as the texts, although in Japanese translation only) of the Illustrated London News' Japanese material, see Kanai 1973.)

=== Taku Forts ===
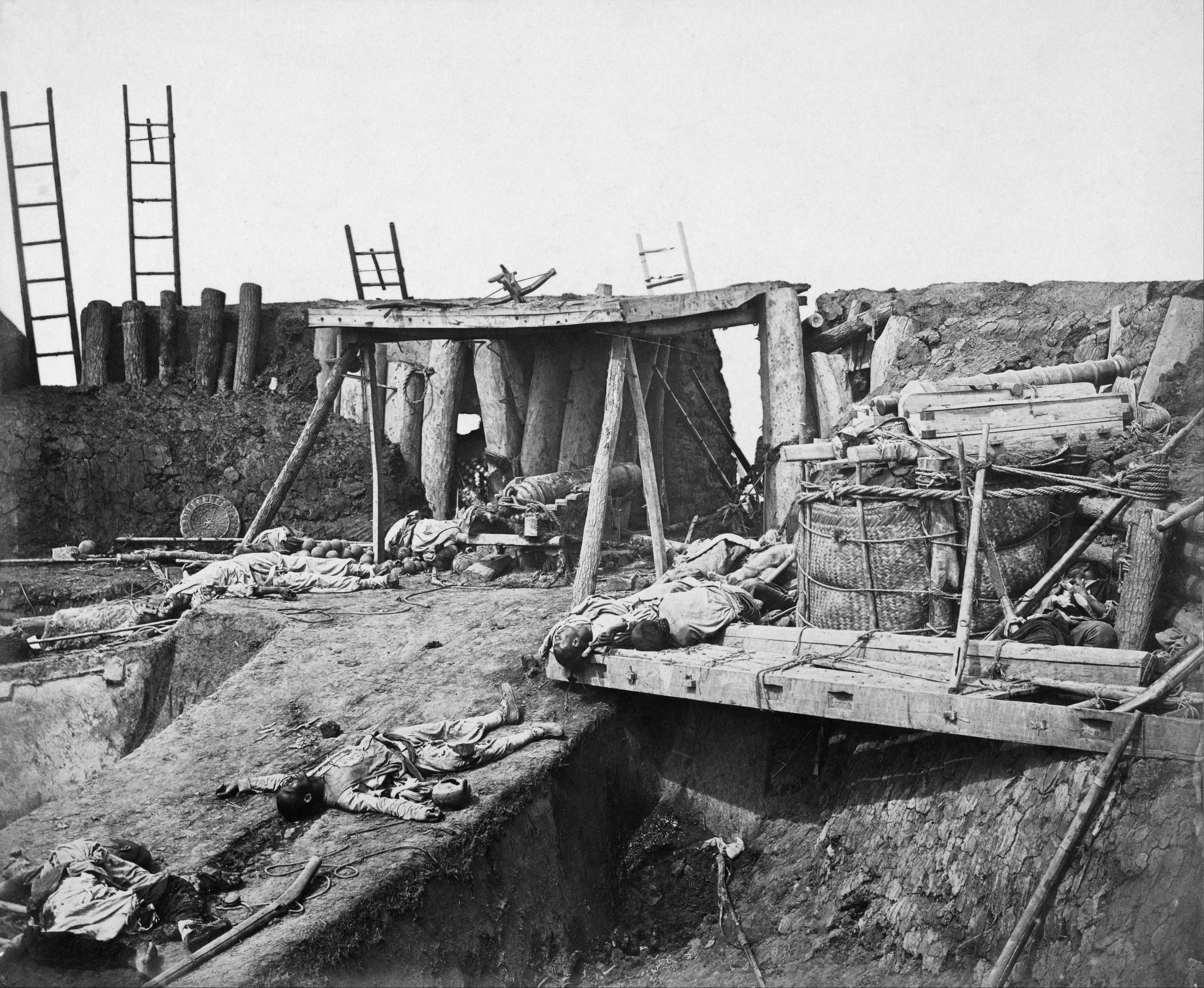
Interior of Fort Taku immediately after capture 21 August 1860

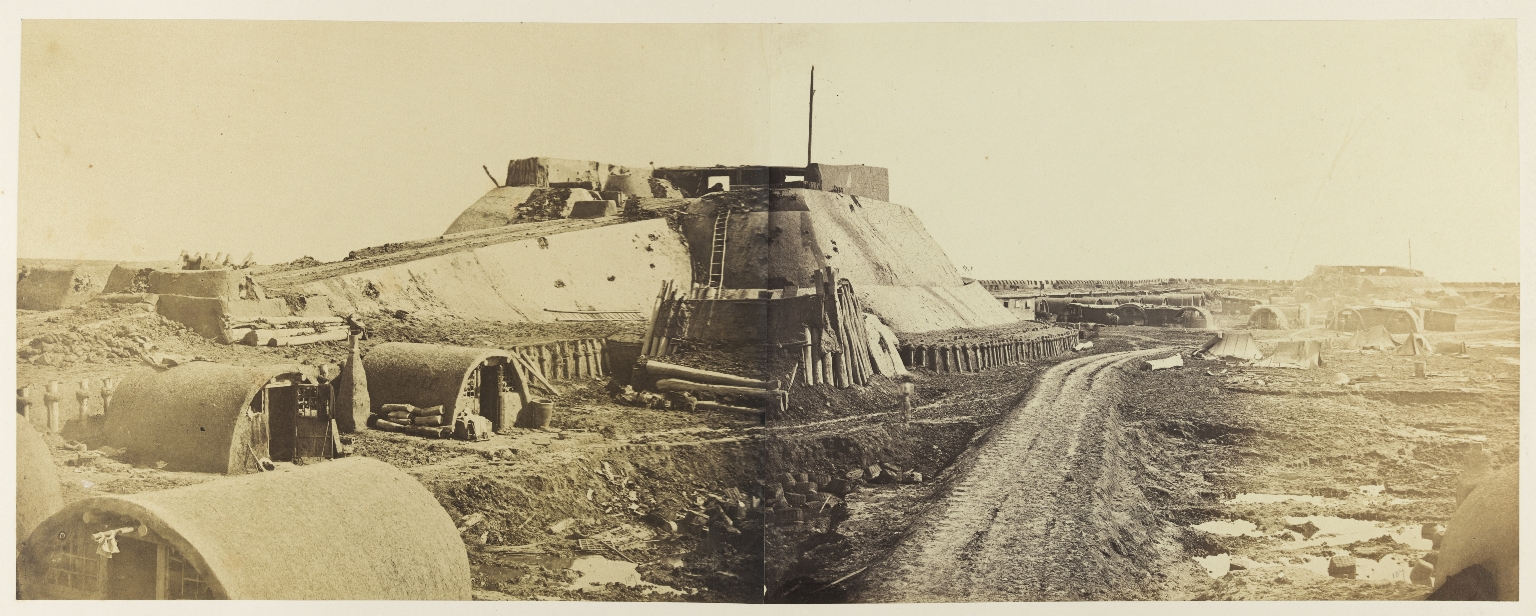
Interior of the 2nd North Fort after its Surrender on 21 August 1860

Beato's photographs of the Second Opium War are the first to document a military campaign as it unfolded, doing so through a sequence of dated and related images. His photographs of the Taku Forts represent this approach on a reduced scale, forming a narrative recreation of the battle. The sequence of images shows the approach to the forts, the effects of bombardments on the exterior walls and fortifications, and finally the devastation within the forts, including the bodies of dead Chinese soldiers. The photographs were not taken in this order, as the photographs of dead people had to be taken first—before the bodies were removed; only then was Beato free to take the other views of the exterior and interior of the forts.

Dr. David F. Rennie, a member of the expedition, noted in his campaign memoir:

I walked round the ramparts on the west side. They were thickly strewed with dead – in the northwest angle, thirteen were lying in one group round a gun. Signor Beato was here in great excitement, characterising the group as "beautiful," and begging that it might not be interfered with until perpetuated by his photographic apparatus, which was done a few minutes afterwards.

=== Summer Palace ===
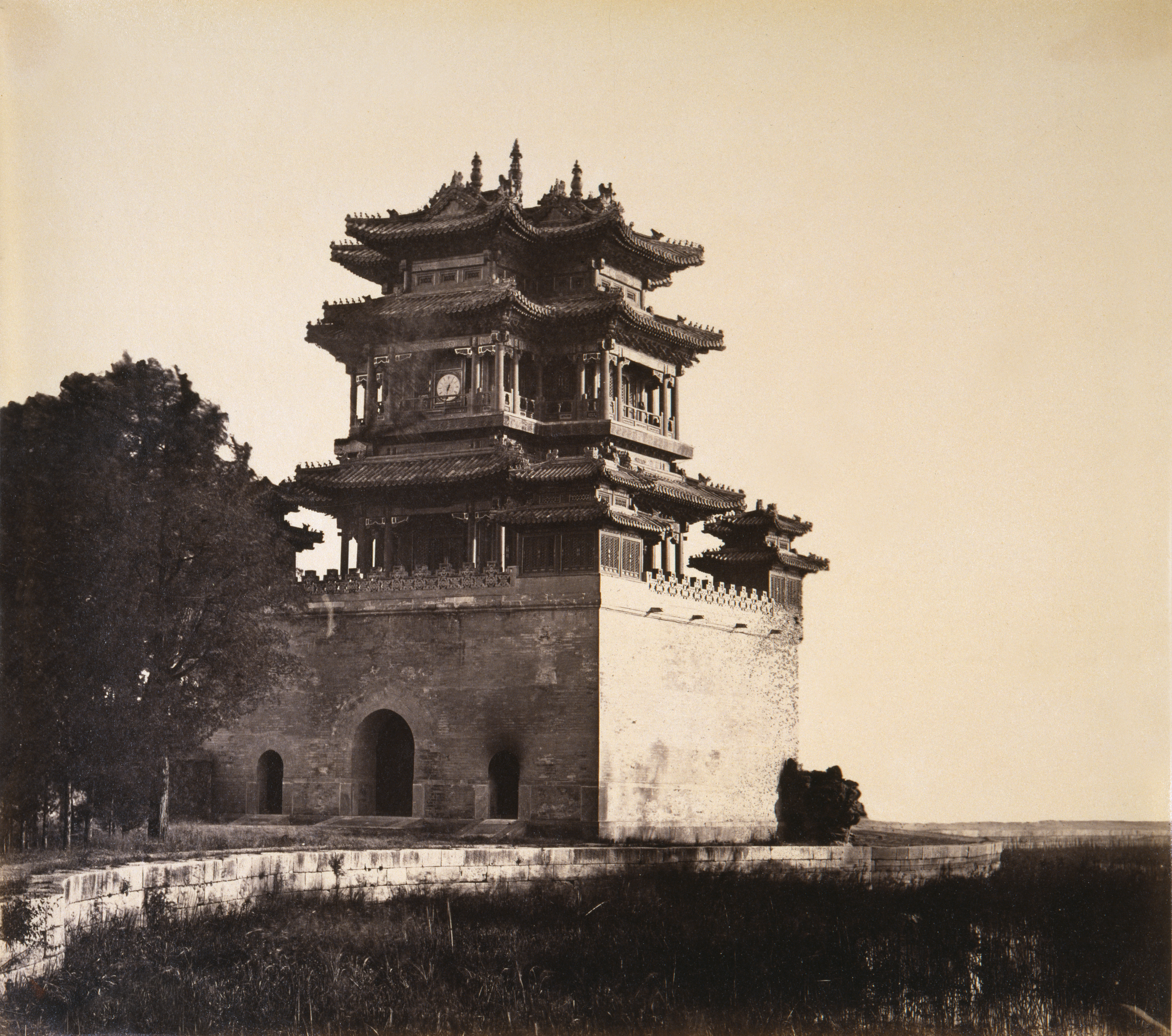
Wenchang Pavilion, aka Wenchang Tower (文昌阁) of the Summer Palace (Yihe Yuan), before being burnt down, October 1860

Just outside Peking, Beato took photographs at Qingyi Yuan (now Yihe Yuan, the Summer Palace), a private estate of the Emperor of China comprising palace pavilions, temples, a large artificial lake, and gardens. Some of these photographs, taken between 6 and 18 October 1860, are unique images of buildings plundered and looted by the Anglo-French forces beginning on 6 October. On 18 and 19 October, the buildings were torched by the British First Division on the orders of Lord Elgin as a reprisal against the emperor for the torture and deaths of twenty members of an Allied diplomatic party. Bennett writes that "These [photographs] appear to be the earliest images of Peking so far discovered, and are of the utmost historical and cultural importance."

Among the last photographs Beato took in China at this time were portraits of Lord Elgin, in Peking to sign the Convention of Peking, and Prince Kung, who signed on behalf of the Xianfeng Emperor. Beato returned to England in October 1861, and during that winter he sold 400 of his photographs of India and China to Henry Hering, a London commercial portrait photographer.

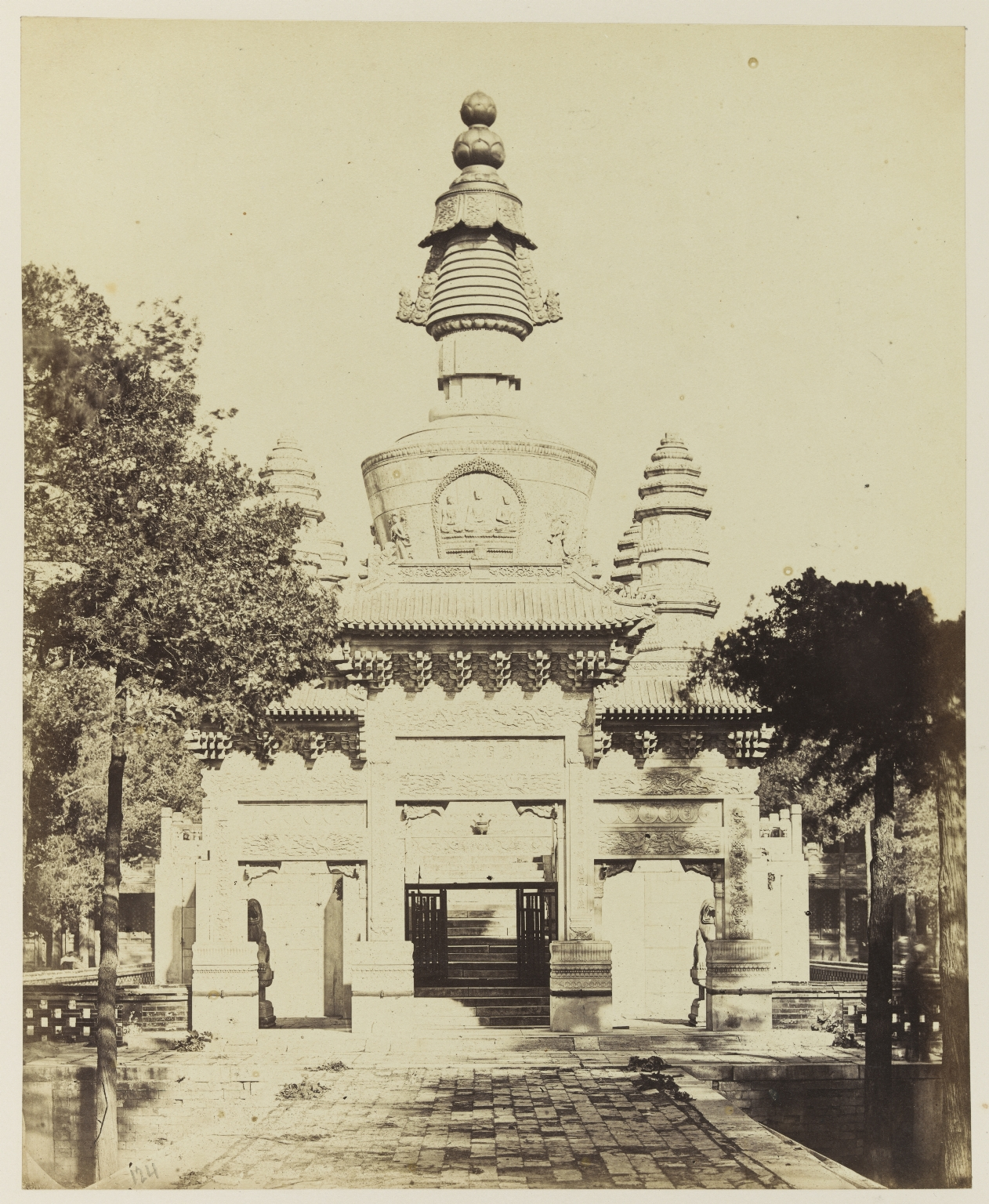
Felice Beato, Tibetan monument in the Lama Temple near Pekin, October 1860

== Japan ==
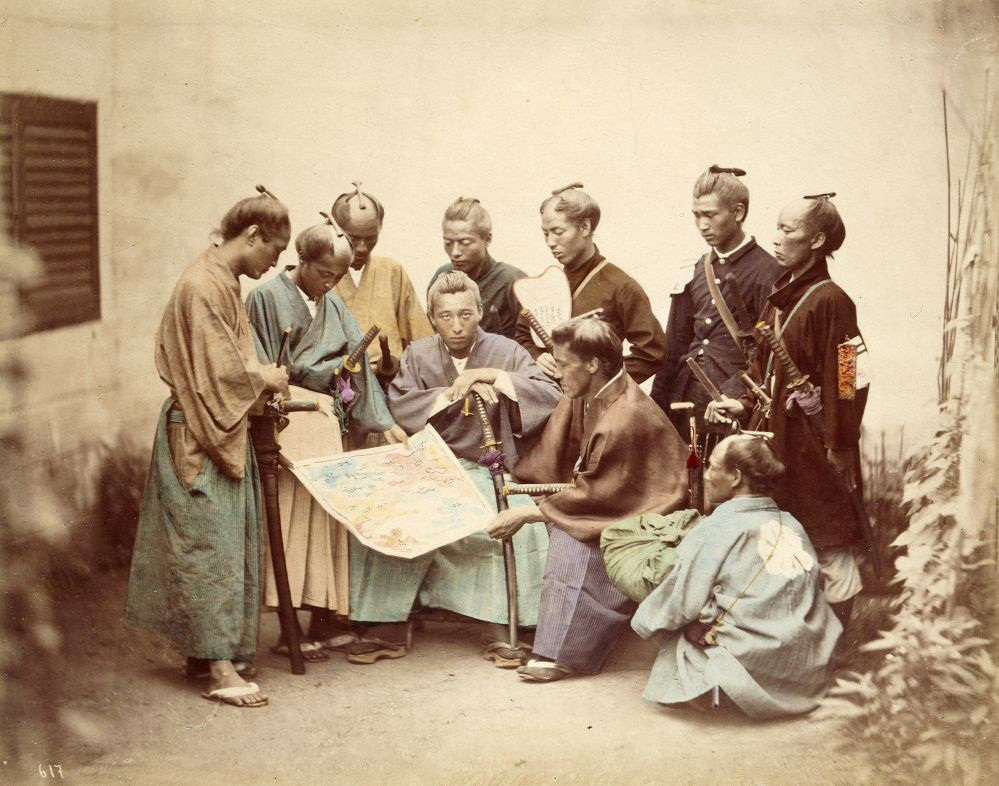
Samurai of the Satsuma Clan, during the Boshin War period (1868–1869)

By 1863 Beato had moved to Yokohama, Japan, joining Charles Wirgman, with whom he had travelled from Bombay to Hong Kong. The two formed and maintained a partnership called "Beato & Wirgman, Artists and Photographers" from 1864 until 1867, one of the earliest and most important commercial studios in Japan. Wirgman again produced illustrations derived from Beato's photographs, while Beato photographed some of Wirgman's sketches and other works. Beato's photographs were also used for engravings within Aimé Humbert's Le Japon illustré, and other works. Beato's Japanese photographs include portraits, genre works, landscapes, cityscapes, and a series of photographs documenting the scenery and sites along the Tōkaidō, the latter series recalling the ukiyo-e of Hiroshige and Hokusai. During this period, foreign access to (and within) the country was greatly restricted by the Tokugawa shogunate. Accompanying ambassadorial delegations and taking any other opportunities created by his personal popularity and close relationship with the British military, Beato reached areas of Japan where few westerners had ventured. In addition to conventionally pleasing subjects, he sought sensational and macabre subject matter such as heads on display after decapitation. His images are remarkable not only for their quality but also for their rarity as photographic views of Edo period Japan.

The greater part of Beato's work in Japan contrasted strongly with his earlier work in India and China, which "had underlined and even celebrated conflict and the triumph of British imperial might". Aside from the Portrait of Prince Kung, any appearances of Chinese people in Beato's earlier work had been peripheral (minor, blurred, or both) or as corpses. With the exception of his work in September 1864 as an official photographer on the British military expedition to Shimonoseki, Beato was eager to portray Japanese people, and did so uncondescendingly, even showing them as defiant in the face of the elevated status of westerners.

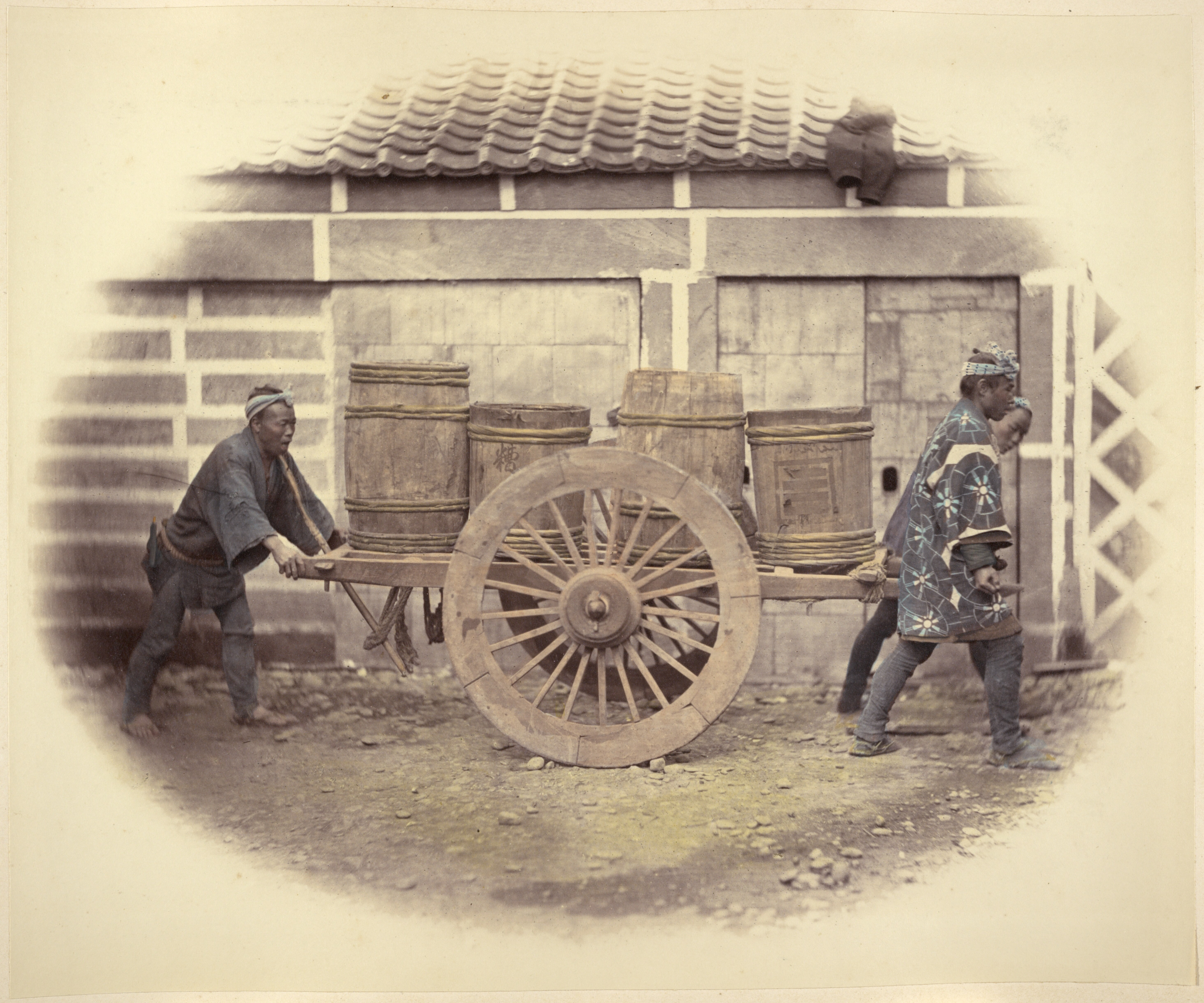
A hand-coloured photo taken by Beato of laborers from Japan pushing a cart (c. 1866–1867)

Beato was very active while in Japan. In 1865 he produced a number of dated views of Nagasaki and its surroundings. From 1866 he was often caricatured in Japan Punch, founded and edited by Wirgman. In an October 1866 fire that destroyed much of Yokohama, Beato lost his studio and many, perhaps all, of his negatives.

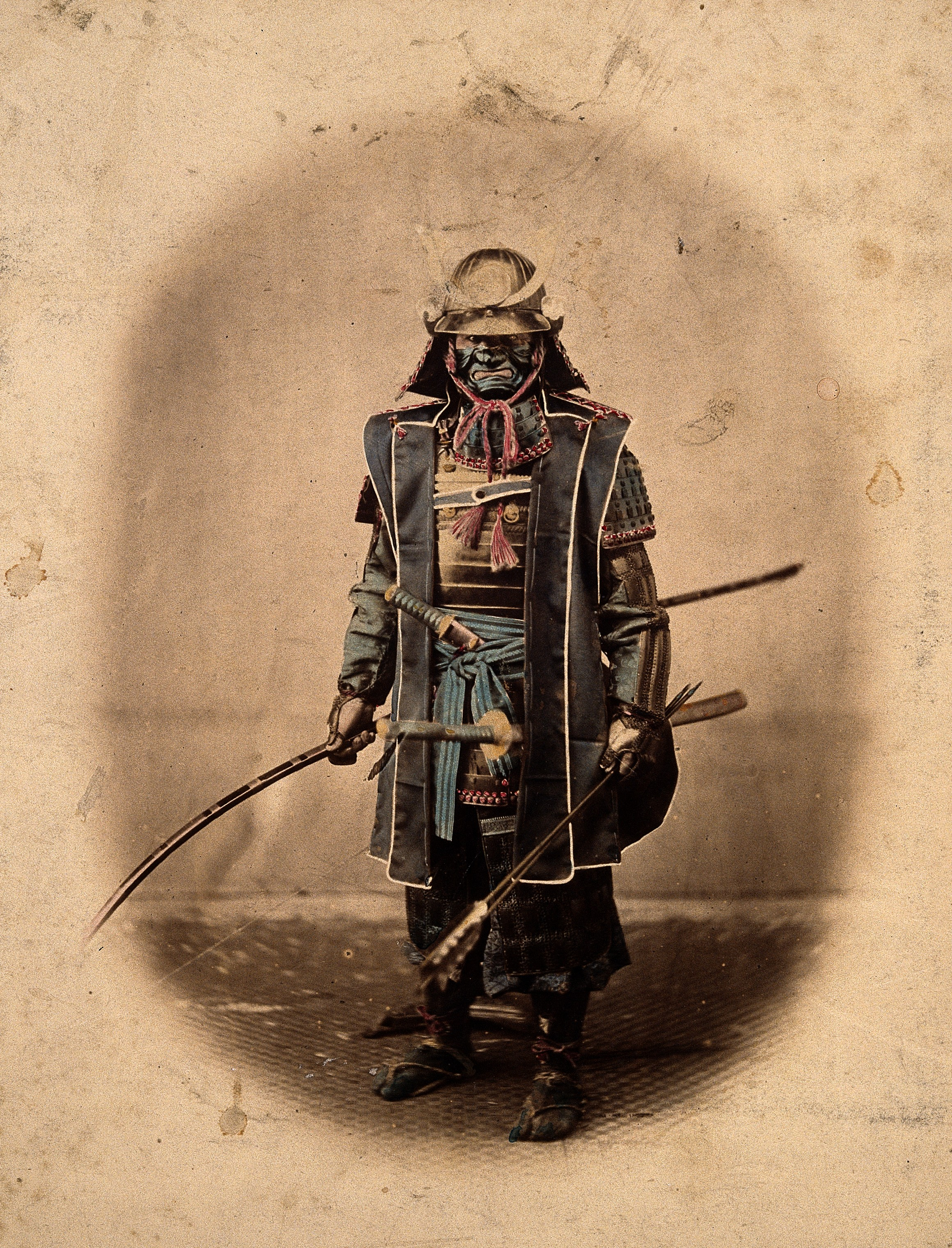
Koboto Santaro, a Japanese military commander, wearing traditional armour, c. 1868

While Beato was the first photographer in Japan to sell albums of his works, he quickly recognised their full commercial potential. By around 1870 their sale had become the mainstay of his business. Although the customer would select the content of earlier albums, Beato moved towards albums of his own selection. It was probably Beato who introduced to photography in Japan the double concept of views and costumes/manners, an approach common in photography of the Mediterranean. By 1868 Beato had readied two volumes of photographs, Native Types, containing 100 portraits and genre works, and Views of Japan, containing 98 landscapes and cityscapes. Many of the photographs in Beato's albums were hand-coloured, a technique that in his studio successfully applied the refined skills of Japanese watercolourists and woodblock printmakers to European photography.

From about the time of the ending of his partnership with Wirgman in 1869, Beato attempted to retire from the work of a photographer, instead attempting other ventures and delegating photographic work to others within his own studio in Yokohama, "F. Beato & Co., Photographers", which he ran with an assistant named H. Woollett, four Japanese photographers and four Japanese artists. Kusakabe Kimbei was probably one of Beato's artist-assistants before becoming a photographer in his own right. These other ventures failed, but Beato's photographic skills and personal popularity ensured he could successfully return to work as a photographer. Beato photographed with Ueno Hikoma, and possibly taught photography to Raimund von Stillfried.

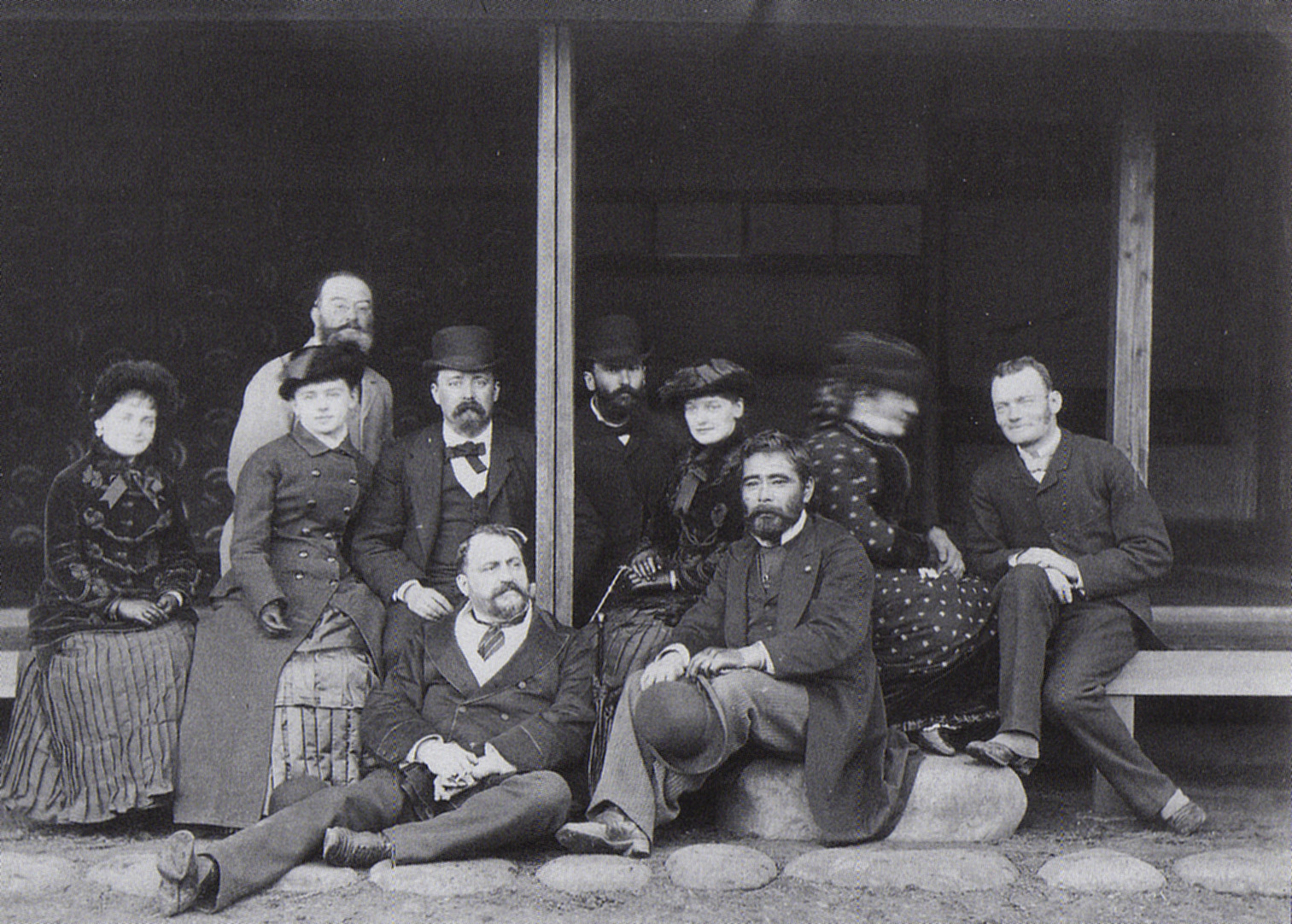
Beato with Saigo Tsugumichi (both seated in front), with foreign friends. Photograph by Hugues Krafft in 1882

In 1871 Beato served as official photographer with the United States naval expedition of Admiral Rodgers to Korea. Although it is possible an unidentified Frenchman photographed Korea during the 1866 invasion of Ganghwa Island, Beato's photographs are the earliest of Korea whose provenance is clear. Beato's business ventures in Japan were numerous. He owned land and several studios, was a property consultant, had a financial interest in the Grand Hotel of Yokohama, and was a dealer in imported carpets and women's bags, among other things. He also appeared in court on several occasions, variously as plaintiff, defendant, and witness. On 6 August 1873 Beato was appointed Consul General for Greece in Japan.

In 1877 Beato sold most of his stock to the firm Stillfried & Andersen, who then moved into his studio. In turn, Stillfried & Andersen sold the stock to Adolfo Farsari in 1885. Following the sale to Stillfried & Andersen, Beato apparently retired for some years from photography, concentrating on his parallel career as a financial speculator and trader. On 29 November 1884 he left Japan, ultimately landing in Port Said, Egypt. It was reported in a Japanese newspaper he had lost all his money speculating on the Yokohama silver exchange.

== Burma and later years ==
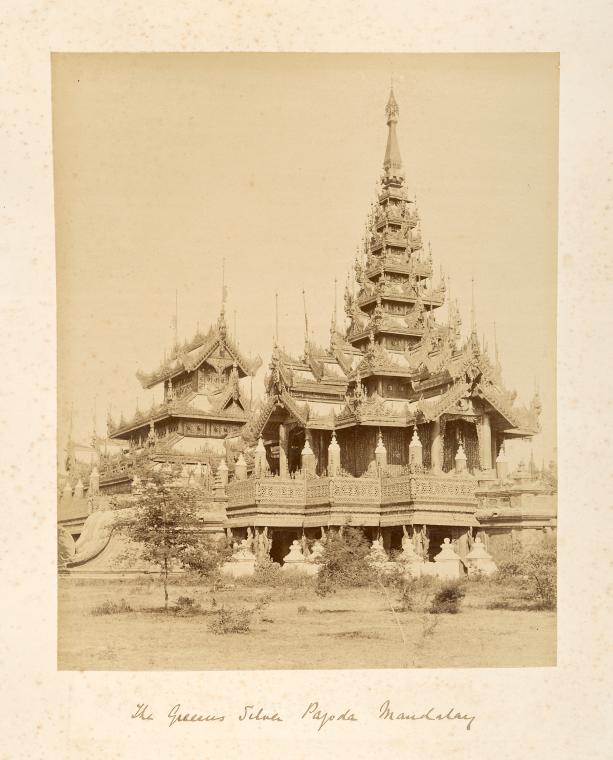
Queen's Silver Pagoda, Mandalay, c. 1889

From 1884 to 1885 Beato was the official photographer of the Nile Expedition led by Baron (later Viscount) G.J. Wolseley to Khartoum, Sudan, in relief of General Charles Gordon. Arriving in April 1885, however, he missed the unsuccessful relief mission by three months and had to turn his attention to documenting the withdrawal of Wolseley's troops to the coastal town of Suakin. Briefly back in England in 1886, Beato lectured to the London and Provincial Photographic Society on photographic techniques.

He arrived in Burma probably in December 1886, after Upper Burma had been annexed by the British in late 1885. Much publicity had been made in the British press about the three Anglo-Burmese Wars, which had started in 1825 and culminated in December 1885 with the fall of Mandalay and the capture of King Thibaw Min. Beato, who had covered military operations in India and China, was probably attracted by the news of the annexation. While he arrived in Burma after the main military operations ended, he would still get to see more of the action, as the annexation by the British led to an insurgency which lasted for the following decade. This allowed Beato to take a number of pictures of the British military in operations or at the Royal Palace, Mandalay, and photograph insurgency soldiers and prisoners. Beato set up a photographic studio in Mandalay and, in 1894, a curiosa and antiques dealership, running both businesses separately and, according to records at the time, very successfully.

His past experience and the credibility derived from his time in Japan brought him a large clientele of opulent locals, posing in traditional attire for official portraits. Other images, from Buddhas to landscapes and buildings, were sold from master albums in Burma and Europe. In 1896, Trench Gascoigne published some of Beato's images in Among Pagodas and Fair Ladies. The following year, Mrs Ernest Hart's Picturesque Burma included more, while George W. Bird in his Wanderings in Burma not only presented thirty-five credited photographs but published a long description of Beato's businesses and recommended visitors to come by his shop. By that time, Beato's photographs had come to represent the very image of Burma to the rest of the world, which it would remain for decades to come.

As his curios business developed, with branches in Rangoon, Mandalay but also in Colombo and London, he also acquired the Photographic Art Gallery in Mandalay in 1903, another photographic studio. In his old age, Beato had become an important business party in Colonial Burma, involved in many enterprises from electric works to life insurance and mining.

== Death and legacy ==
Although Beato was previously believed to have died in Rangoon or Mandalay in 1905 or 1906, his death certificate, discovered in 2009, indicates he died on 29 January 1909 in Florence, Italy.

Whether acknowledged as his own work, sold as Stillfried & Andersen's, or encountered as anonymous engravings, Beato's work had a major impact:

For over fifty years into the early twentieth century, Beato's photographs of Asia constituted the standard imagery of travel diaries, illustrated newspapers, and other published accounts, and thus helped shape "Western" notions of several Asian societies.

== Photographic techniques ==
Photographs of the 19th century often now show the limitations of the technology used, yet Beato managed to successfully work within and even transcend those limitations. He predominantly produced albumen silver prints from wet collodion glass-plate negatives.

Beato pioneered and refined the techniques of hand-colouring photographs, and making panoramas. He may have started hand-colouring photographs at the suggestion of Wirgman, or he may have seen the hand-coloured photographs made by partners Charles Parker and William Parke Andrew. Whatever the inspiration, Beato's coloured landscapes are delicate and naturalistic; and his coloured portraits, more strongly coloured than the landscapes, are appraised as excellent. (Note: Bennett quotes and summarises collector Henry Rosin's appraisal of Beato's hand-coloured photographs.) As well as providing views in colour, Beato worked to represent very large subjects in a way that gave a sense of their vastness. Throughout his career, Beato's work is marked by spectacular panoramas, which he produced by carefully making several contiguous exposures of a scene and then joining the resulting prints together, thereby re-creating the expansive view. The complete version of his panorama of Pehtang comprises seven photographs joined almost seamlessly for a total length of more than 2 metres (6.6 ft).

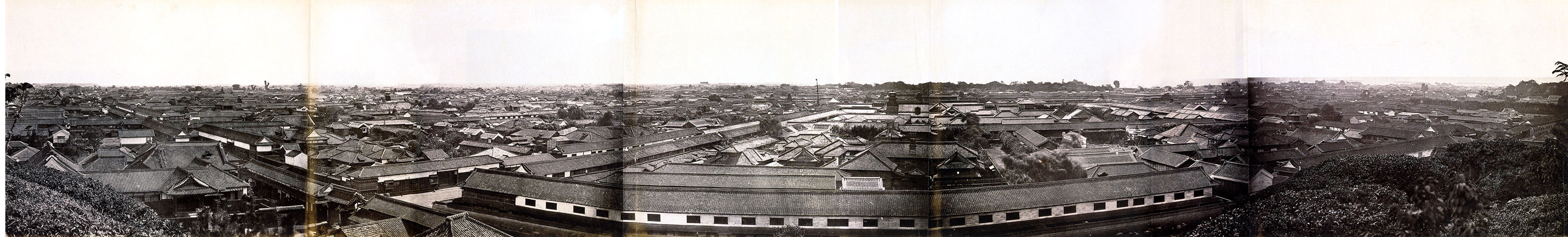
Panorama of Yedo from Atagoyama: a panorama (comprising five albumen prints) of Edo (now Tokyo), showing daimyō residences, 1865 or 1866

== See also ==
- History of photography 1850–1900
- Felice...Felice..., a 1998 Dutch drama loosely based on Beato's time in Japan
- Sakoku
- List of Westerners who visited Japan before 1868
- Felice A. Beato
- Baron Raimund von Stillfried
- John McCosh, 19th-century photographer in Burma
- Philip Adolphe Klier, 19th-century photographer in Burma
- List of Orientalist artists
- Orientalism
