= Colorization =

Colorization, colourization, colorisation, or colourisation may refer to:

- Film colorization, adding color to black-and-white moving-picture images
- Hand-colouring of photographs, adding colour to a black-and-white still images
