= Kusakabe Kimbei =

Japanese photographer (1841–1934)

- 日下部金兵衛
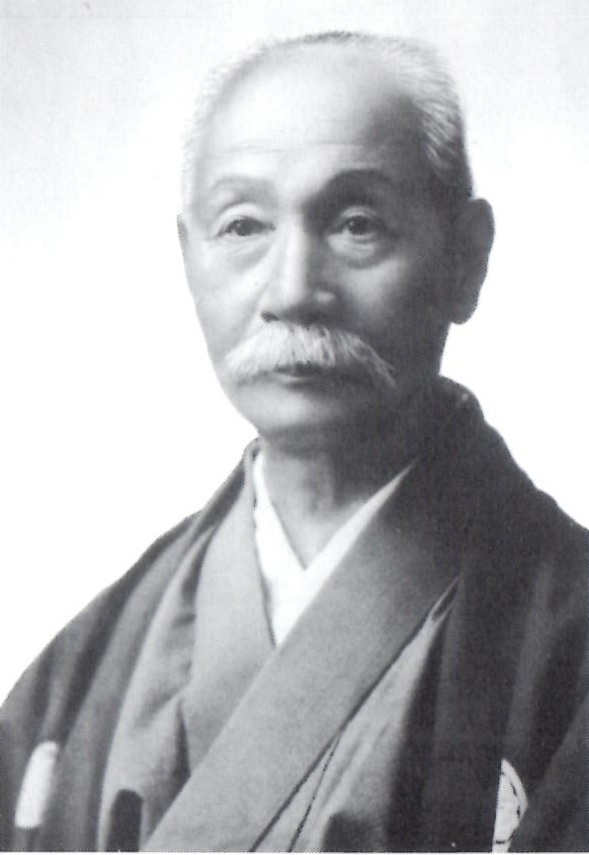
- Born: November 24, 1841 or November 27, 1841; Kōfu, Kai Province, Japan
- Died: April 19, 1932 or April 19, 1934
- Occupation: photographer

Kusakabe Kimbei (日下部 金兵衛; 1841–1934) was a Japanese photographer. He usually went by his given name, Kimbei, because his clientele, mostly non-Japanese-speaking foreign residents and visitors, found it easier to pronounce than his family name.

== Career ==
Kusakabe Kimbei worked with Felice Beato and Baron Raimund von Stillfried as a photographic colourist and assistant. In 1881, Kimbei opened his own workshop in Yokohama, in the Benten-dōri quarter. From 1889, the studio operated in the Honmachi quarter.

By 1893, his was one of the leading Japanese studios supplying art to Western customers. Many of the photographs in the studio's catalogue featured depictions of Japanese women, which were popular with tourists of the time. Kimbei preferred to portray female subjects in a traditional bijinga style, and hired geisha to pose for the photographs. Many of his albums are mounted in accordion fashion.

Around 1885, Kimbei acquired the negatives of Felice Beato and of Stillfried, as well as those of Uchida Kuichi. Kusakabe also acquired some of Ueno Hikoma's negatives of Nagasaki.

Kimbei retired as a photographer in 1914.

== Gallery ==
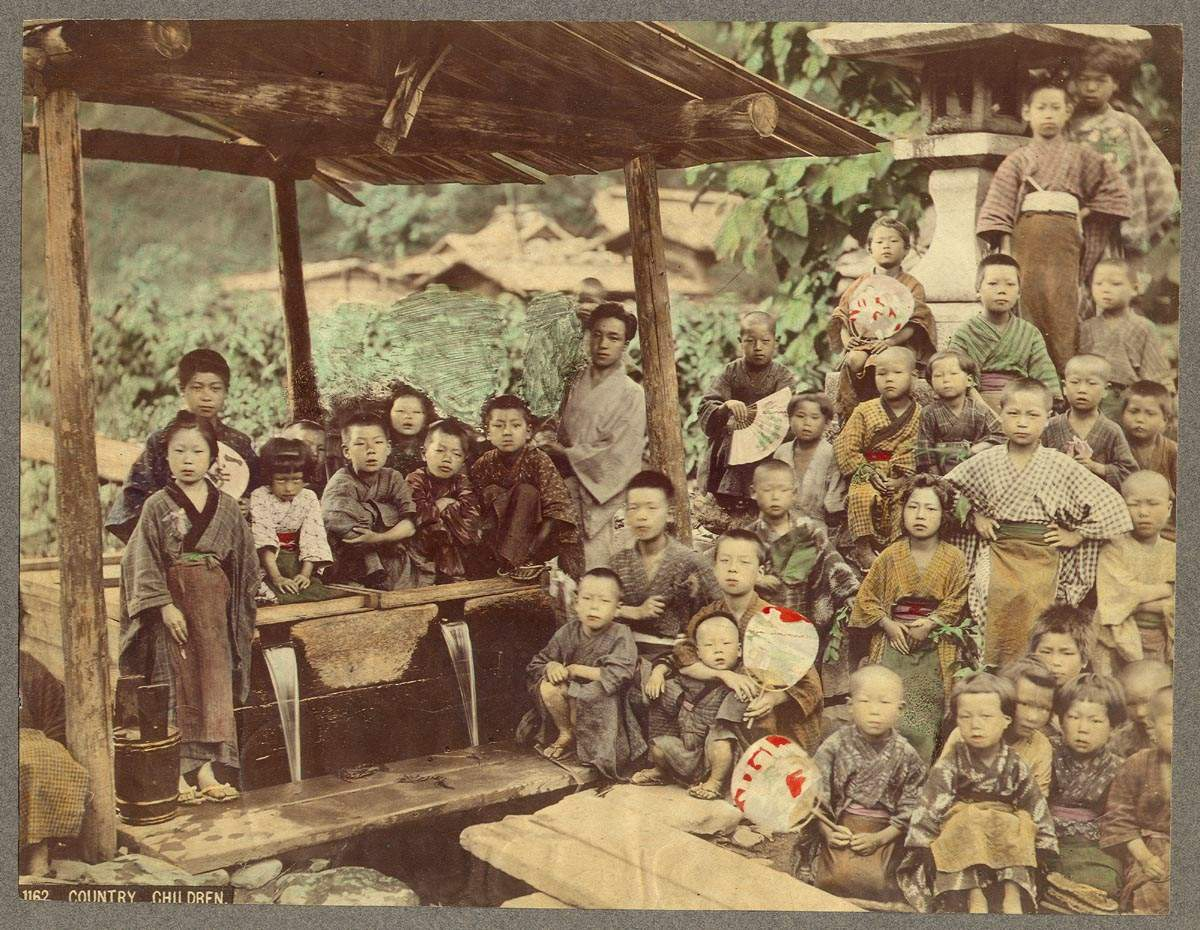
Country children

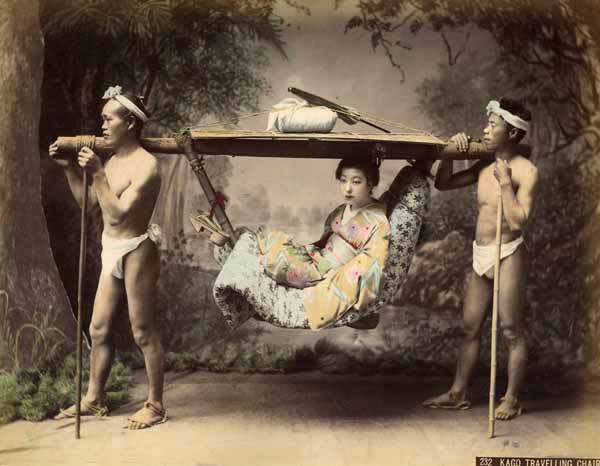
Kago Travelling Chair

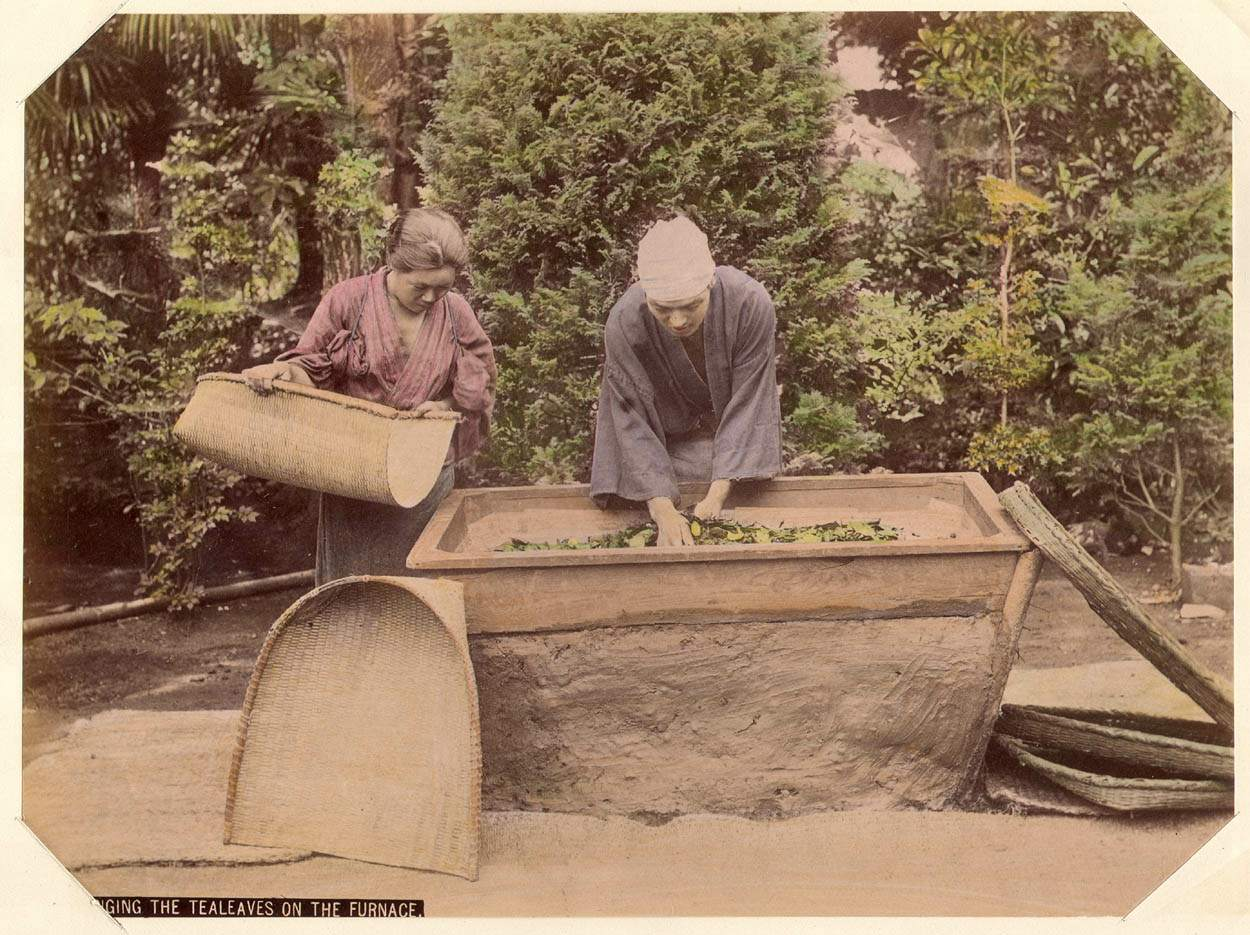
Wringing the Tealeaves on the Furnace

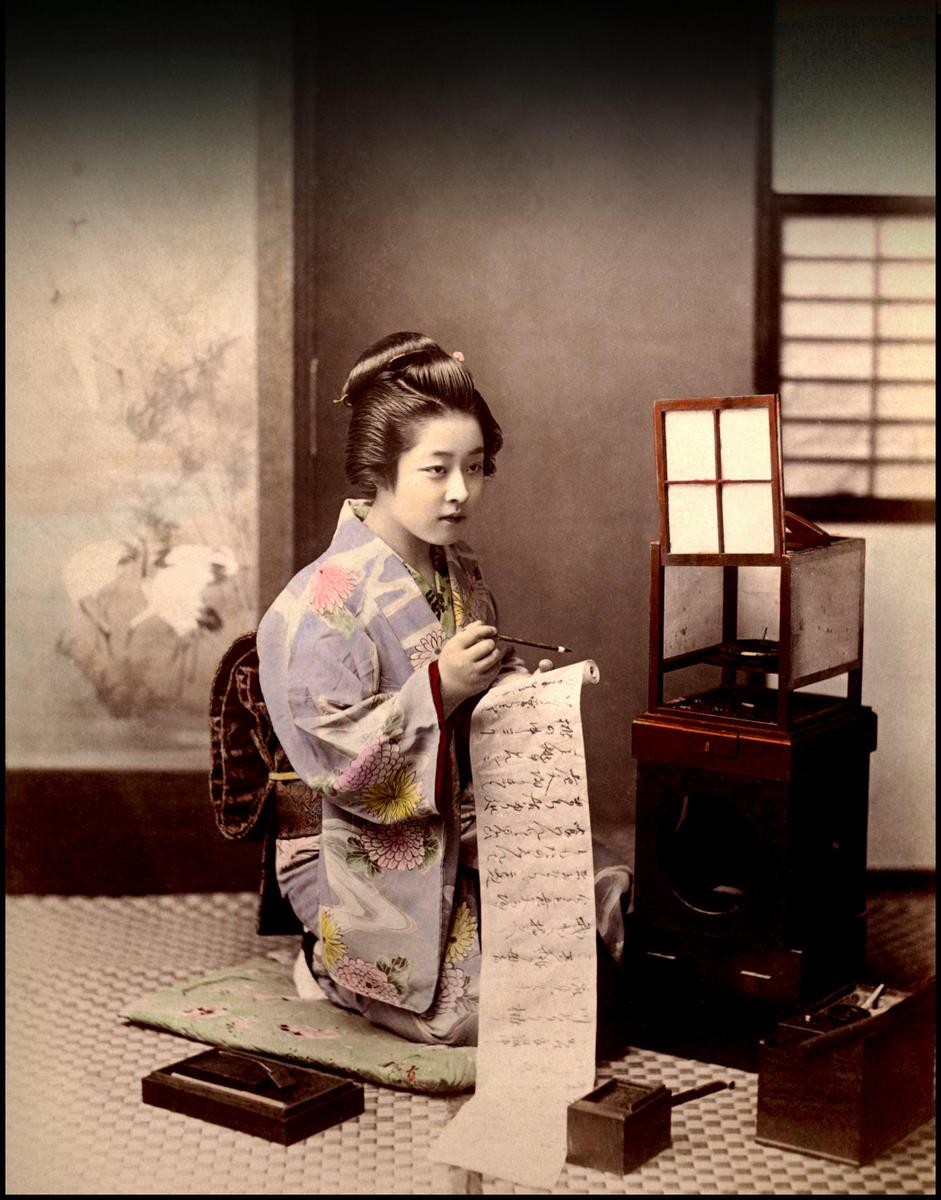
Writing Letter (also known as Letter Writer)

Yumoto lake at Nikkō, Tochigi (日光市), Japan

Buddha statue at Hakone, Japan

Bell of Daibutsu in Kyoto

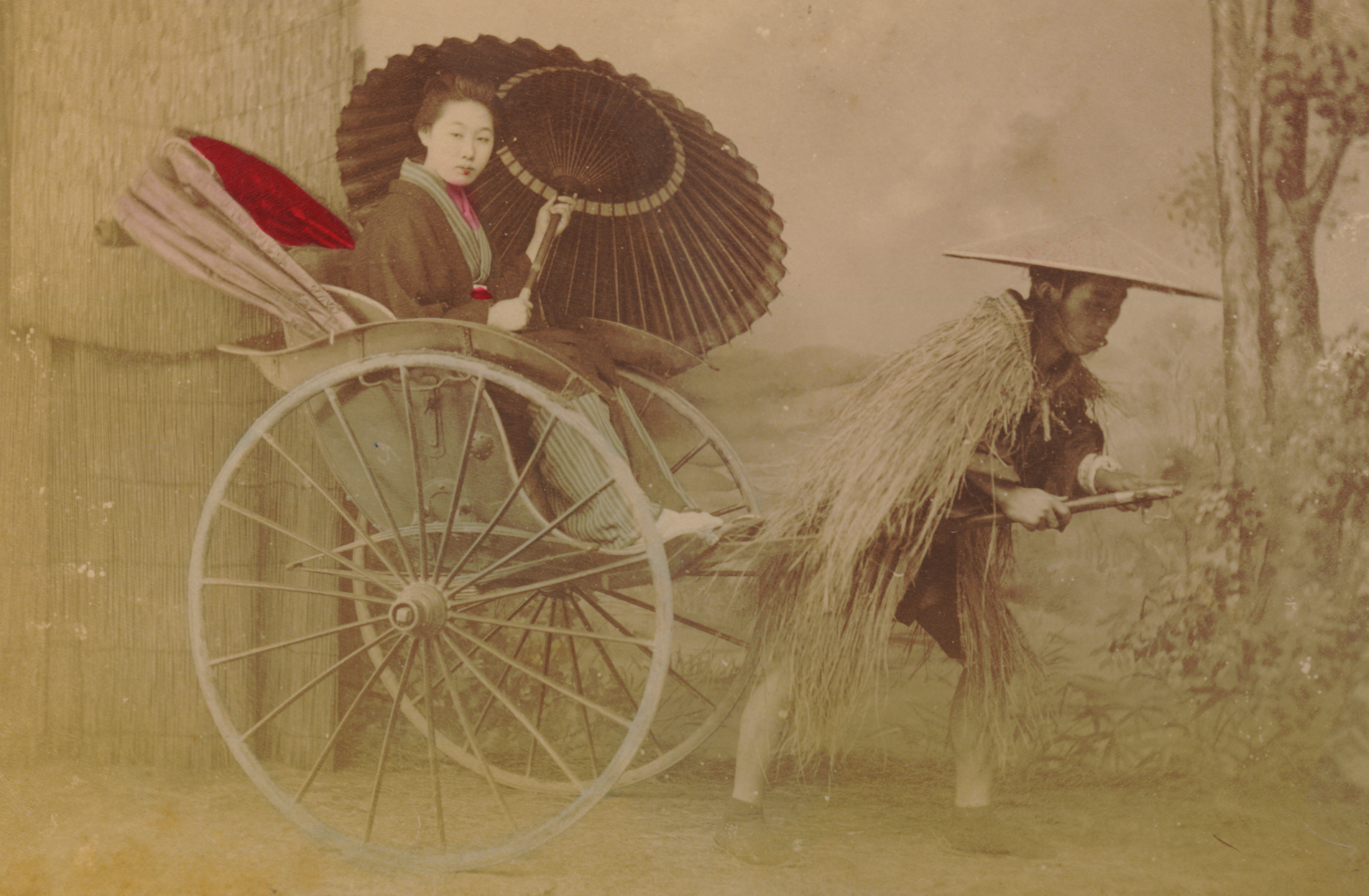
Japanese woman in jinrikisha

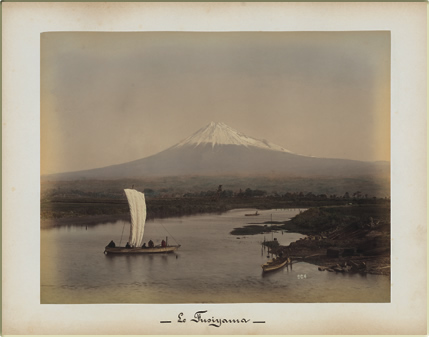
View of Mount Fuji. Hand-coloured albumen silver print, 1880.

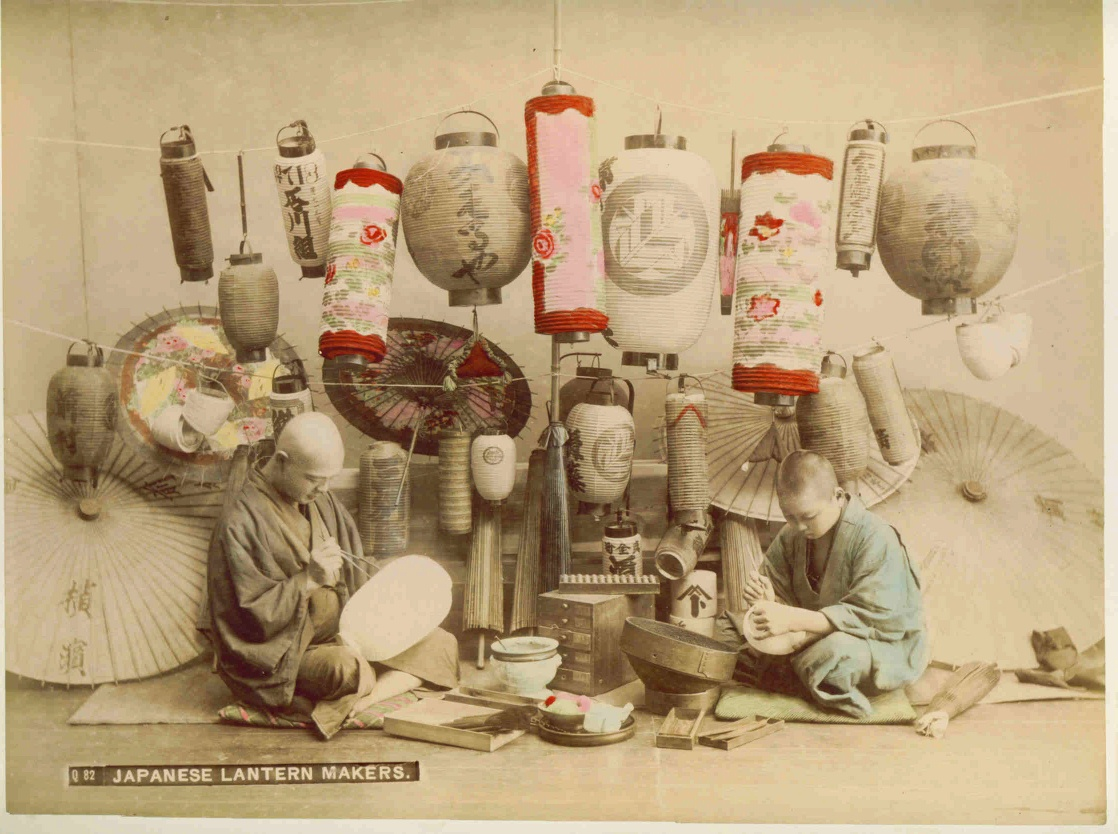
Japanese Lantern Makers
