= Shae DeTar =

Shae Acopian DeTar (born 1977 or 1978) is an American fine art photographer and former model, based in Los Angeles. She's known for colorful, hand-colored photographs of nude women, often posed in nature.

DeTar was born in Pennsylvania and raised in Pennsylvania and New York. When she was 18, she began modeling, mostly in Europe. She studied fashion at Parsons School of Design, and only took up photography when she was about 32. DeTar's aesthetic is inspired by magazine collages, and she has resurrected the old tradition of hand-colored photographs, highlighting her models in vivid, exaggerated colors.

In 2016 DeTar was awarded "best editorial" by Photo District News.

In 2023 she published Another World, a collection of photographs from the first 12 years of her career. She was also featured in Charlotte Jansen's 2017 photography book, Girl on Girl: Art and Photography in the Age of the Female Gaze, among other women photographers of female nudes.
