= Stillfried & Andersen =

Japanese photographic studio

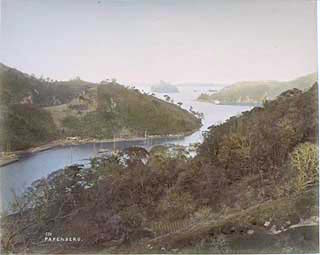
A hand-coloured print by Stillfried & Andersen, between 1862 and 1885

The firm of Stillfried & Andersen, also known as the Japan Photographic Association, was a photographic studio founded by Baron Raimund von Stillfried and Hermann Andersen that operated in Yokohama, Japan between 1876 and 1885. The studio is noted for its portraits and landscapes that were often hand-coloured and presented in bound albums. The firm also produced photographic prints from negatives by Felice Beato.

== History ==
After at least two visits to Japan in the early to mid-1860s, Austrian photographer and nobleman Baron Raimund von Stillfried became a resident of Yokohama in 1868, where it is believed he learned photography from Felice Beato. In 1871, he established his own photographic studio, called Stillfried & Co.. In 1875, Hermann Andersen was listed as an employee of Stillfried & Co. but by 1876, Andersen had formed a partnership with Stillfried and so the firm was renamed Stillfried & Andersen. Another incarnation of the firm was the Japan Photographic Association, under which name it was listed in 1875. Until 1885 the firm operated under both names interchangeably.

In 1877, Stillfried & Andersen purchased the studio and stock of Felice Beato and in the same year or shortly thereafter published Views and Costumes of Japan, which included photographs by Beato and Stillfried, as well as reprints of some of Beato's works.

The partnership between Stillfried and Andersen was legally dissolved in 1878, though Andersen continued to run the studio under the same name of Stillfried & Andersen. In the subsequent years a number of legal battles and other entanglements ensued between the two, also involving Stillfried's brother, Franz von Stillfried. Around 1885, Kusakabe Kimbei obtained a quantity of Stillfried's original negatives, which Kusakabe included in some of his albums in the late 1880s and the 1890s. The firm of Stillfried & Andersen was finally bought by Adolfo Farsari in 1885, by which point neither Stillfried nor Andersen was resident in Japan. Farsari held the bulk of the firm's negatives, only for them to be destroyed in a fire in 1886 along with all of Adolfo Farsari's own stock.

== Collections ==
Stillfried & Andersen photographs can be found in:

- the Royal Collection Trust, United Kingdom
- the Canadian Centre for Architecture, Montreal
- the Museé Guimet, Paris.
