= Monidło =

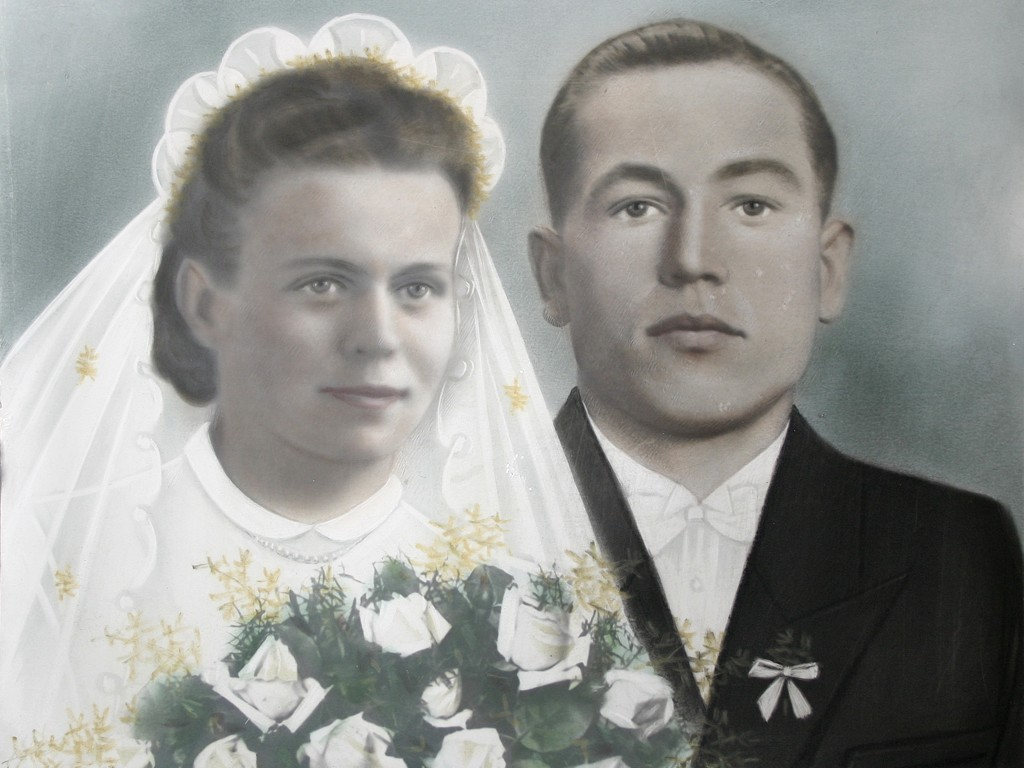

Monidło is the Polish word for a wedding portrait based on a hand-coloured photograph of the bride and bridegroom.
