= Hand-colouring of photographs =

Manually applying colour to black-and-white photographs

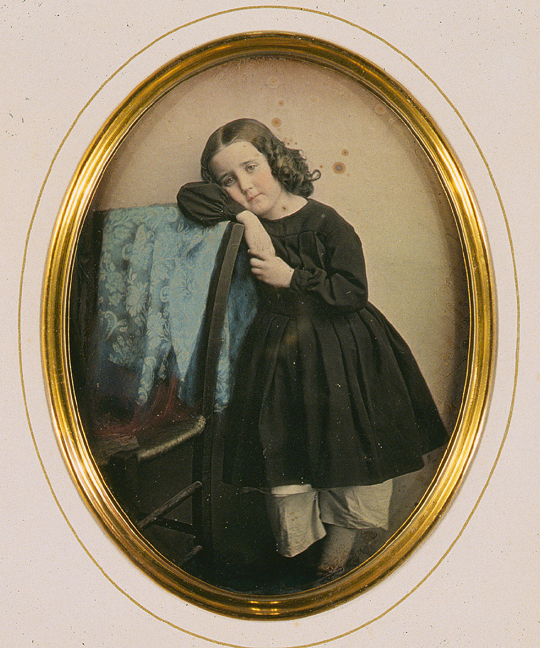
A hand-coloured daguerreotype by J. Garnier, c. 1850

Hand-colouring (or hand-coloring) refers to any method of manually adding colour to a monochrome photograph, generally either to heighten the realism of the image or for artistic purposes. Hand-colouring is also known as hand painting or overpainting.

Typically, watercolours, oils, crayons or pastels, and other paints or dyes are applied to the image surface using brushes, fingers, cotton swabs or airbrushes. Hand-coloured photographs were most popular in the mid- to late-19th century before the invention of colour photography, and some firms specialized in producing hand-coloured photographs.

== History ==
=== Pre-1900 ===
Monochrome (black and white) photography was first exemplified by the daguerreotype in 1839 and later improved by other methods including: calotype, ambrotype, tintype, albumen print, and gelatine silver print. The majority of photography remained monochrome until the mid-20th century, although experiments were producing colour photography as early as 1855 and some photographic processes produced images with an inherent overall colour like the blue of cyanotypes.

In an attempt to create more realistic images, photographers and artists would hand-colour monochrome photographs. The first hand-coloured daguerreotypes are attributed to Swiss painter and printmaker Johann Baptist Isenring, who used a mixture of gum arabic and pigments to colour daguerreotypes soon after their invention in 1839. Coloured powder was fixed on the delicate surface of the daguerreotype by the application of heat. Variations of this technique were patented in England by Richard Beard in 1842 and in France by Étienne Lecchi in 1842 and Léotard de Leuze in 1845. Later, hand-colouring was used with successive photographic innovations, from albumen and gelatine silver prints to lantern slides and transparency photography.

Parallel efforts to produce coloured photographic images affected the popularity of hand-colouring. In 1842 Daniel Davis Jr. patented a method for colouring daguerreotypes through electroplating, and his work was refined by Warren Thompson the following year. The results of the work of Davis and Thompson were only partially successful in creating colour photographs and the electroplating method was soon abandoned. In 1850 Levi L. Hill announced his invention of a process of daguerreotyping in natural colours in his Treatise on Daguerreotype. Sales of conventional uncoloured and hand-coloured daguerreotypes fell in anticipation of this new technology. Hill delayed publication of the details of his process for several years, however, and his claims soon came to be considered fraudulent. When he finally did publish his treatise in 1856, the process – whether bona fide or not – was certainly impractical and dangerous.

With the advent of photographic emulsions on glass came the potential to make enlargements from them, but for lack of a sufficiently strong light source to project them on to the receiving emulsion as prints on paper, canvas or other supports. The solar camera, employing the focussed light of the sun, addressed the problem in a repurposing of the solar microscope by American portrait artist David Acheson Woodward in 1857, and others, before being superseded by enlargers employing artificial light sources from the 1880s. Life-size portraits made by this means were hand coloured in crayon or overpainted in oils and were popular into the 1910s.

Hand-colouring remained the easiest and most effective method to produce full-colour photographic images until the mid-20th century when American Kodak introduced Kodachrome colour film.

==== Japanese hand-coloured photographs (circa 1860–1899) ====
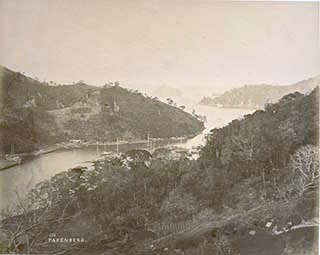
Original monochrome photo

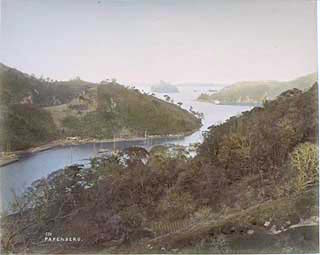
Hand-coloured version

Print by Stillfried & Andersen between 1875 and 1885

Though the hand-colouring of photographs was introduced in Europe, the technique gained considerable popularity in Japan, where the practice became a respected and refined art form beginning in the 1860s. It is possible that photographer Charles Parker and his artist partner William Parke Andrew were the first to produce such works in Japan, but the first to consistently employ hand-colouring in the country were the photographer Felice Beato and his partner, The Illustrated London News artist and colourist Charles Wirgman. In Beato's studio the refined skills of Japanese watercolourists and woodblock printmakers were successfully applied to European photography, as evidenced in Beato's volume of hand-coloured portraits, Native Types.

Another notable early photographer in Japan to use hand-colouring was Yokoyama Matsusaburō. Yokoyama had trained as a painter and lithographer as well as a photographer, and he took advantage of his extensive repertoire of skills and techniques to create what he called shashin abura-e (写真油絵) or "photographic oil paintings", in which the paper support of a photograph was cut away and oil paints then applied to the remaining emulsion.

Later practitioners of hand-colouring in Japan included the firm of Stillfried & Andersen, which acquired Beato's studio in 1877 and hand-coloured many of his negatives in addition to its own. Austrian Baron Raimund von Stillfried und Ratenitz, trained Japanese photographer and colourist Kusakabe Kimbei, and together they created hand-coloured images of Japanese daily life that were very popular as souvenirs. Hand-coloured photographs were also produced by Kusakabe Kimbei, Tamamura Kozaburō, Adolfo Farsari, Uchida Kuichi, Ogawa Kazumasa and others. Many high-quality hand-coloured photographs continued to be made in Japan well into the 20th century.

=== Post-1900 ===
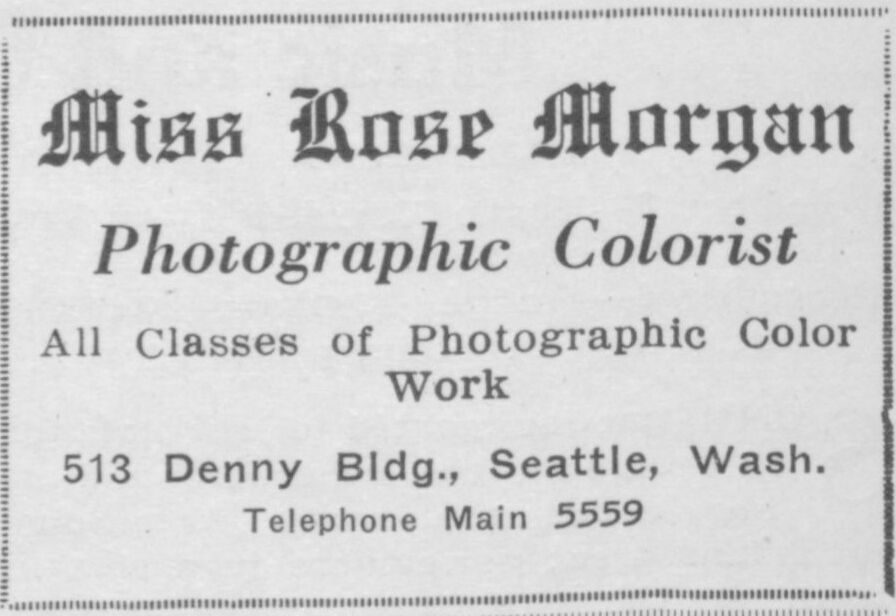
A typical ad for a photographic colourist, Seattle, 1917

The so-called golden age of hand-coloured photography in the western hemisphere occurred between 1900 and 1940. The increased demand for hand-coloured landscape photography at the beginning of the 20th century is attributed to the work of Wallace Nutting. Nutting, a New England minister, pursued hand-coloured landscape photography as a hobby until 1904, when he opened a professional studio. He spent the next 35 years creating hand-coloured photographs, and became the best-selling hand-coloured photographer of all time.

Between 1915 and 1925 hand-coloured photographs were popular among the middle classes in the United States, Canada, Bermuda and the Bahamas as affordable and stylish wedding gifts, shower gifts, holiday gifts, friendship gifts, and vacation souvenirs. With the start of the Great Depression in 1929, and the subsequent decrease in the numbers of the middle class, sales of hand-coloured photographs sharply diminished.

Despite their downturn in popularity, skilled photographers continued to create beautifully hand-coloured photographs. Hans Bellmer's hand-coloured photographs of his own doll sculptures from the 1930s provide an example of continued hand-colouring of photographs in Europe during this time. In Poland, the Monidło is an example of popular hand-coloured wedding photographs.

Another hand-colour photographer, Luis Márquez (1899–1978), was the official photographer for and art adviser of the Mexican Pavilion at the 1939-40 World's Fair. In 1937 he presented Texas Governor James V. Allred a collection of hand-coloured photographs. The National Autonomous University of Mexico in Mexico City has an extensive Luis Márquez photographic archive, as does the University of Houston in Texas.

By the 1950s, the availability of colour film stopped the production of hand-coloured photographs. The upsurge in popularity of antiques and collectibles in the 1960s, however, increased interest in hand-coloured photographs. Since about 1970 there has been something of a revival of hand-colouring, as seen in the work of such artist-photographers as Robin Renee Hix, Elizabeth Lennard, Jan Saudek, Kathy Vargas, Rita Dibert and Shae DeTar. Robert Rauschenberg's and others' use of combined photographic and painting media in their art represents a precursor to this revival.

In spite of the availability of high-quality colour processes, hand-coloured photographs (often combined with sepia toning) are still popular for aesthetic reasons and because the pigments used have great permanence. In many countries where colour film was rare or expensive, or where colour processing was unavailable, hand-colouring continued to be used and sometimes preferred into the 1980s. More recently, digital image processing has been used – particularly in advertising – to recreate the appearance and effects of hand-colouring. Colorization is now available to the amateur photographer using image manipulation software such as Adobe Photoshop or Gimp.

== Materials and techniques ==
=== Dyes ===
Basic dyes are used in the hand-colouring of photographs. Dyes are soluble colour substance, either natural or synthetic, in an aqueous solution, as opposed to pigments which are generally insoluble colour substance in an aqueous suspension. Aniline dyes, the first synthetically produced dyes originally used for the dyeing of textiles, were first used to dye albumen prints and glass transparency photographs in Germany in the 1860s. When hand-colouring with dyes, a weak solution of dye in water is preferred, and colours are often built up with repeated washes rather than being applied all at once. The approach is to stain or dye the print rather than to paint it, as too much paint will obscure photographic details. Blotting paper is used to control the amount of dye on the surface by absorbing any excess.

=== Watercolours ===
Watercolour paint has the virtue of being more permanent than dyes, but is less transparent and so more likely to obscure details. Hand-colouring with watercolours requires the use of a medium to prevent the colours from drying with a dull and lifeless finish. Before the paint can be applied, the surface of the print must be primed so that the colours are not repelled. This often includes prepping the print with a thin coating of shellac, then adding grit before colouring. Watercolour paint used in photographic hand-colouring consists of four ingredients: pigments (natural or synthetic), a binder (traditionally arabic gum), additives to improve plasticity (such as glycerine), and a solvent to dilute the paint (i.e. water) that evaporates when the paint dries. The paint is typically applied to prints using a soft brush. Watercolours often "leave a darker edge of colour at the boundaries of the painted area." Since different pigments have varying degrees of transparency, the choice of colours must be considered carefully. More transparent pigments are preferred, since they ensure greater visibility of the photographic image.

=== Oils ===
Oil paint contains particles of pigment applied using a drying oil, such as linseed oil. The conventions and techniques of using oils demands a knowledge of drawing and painting, so it is often used in professional practice. When hand-colouring with oils, the approach is more often to use the photographic image simply as a base for a painted image. The ability to create accurate oil portraits using a photographic base lent itself to art crime, with some artists claiming to paint traditional oil portraits (for a higher price) when actually tracing a photograph base in oils. Therefore, the choice of oil colours is governed by the relative transparency of the pigments to allow for authentication of the photographic base. It is necessary to size the print first to prevent absorption of the colours into the paper. In the past, photographic lantern slides were often coloured by the manufacturer, though sometimes by the user, with variable results. Usually, oil colours were used for such slides, though in the collodion era – from 1848 to the end of the 19th century – sometimes watercolours were used as well.

=== Crayons and pastels ===
The use of crayon or pastel sticks of ground pigments in various levels of saturation is also considered a highly skilled colourist's domain, as it requires knowledge of drawing techniques. Like oils, crayons and pastels generally obscure the original photograph, which produces portraits more akin to traditional paintings. The Photo-crayotype, Chromotypes and Crayon Collotypes were all used to colourize photographs by the application of crayons and pigments over a photographic impression. Charcoal and coloured pencils are also used in hand-colouring of photographs and the terms crayon, pastel, charcoal, and pencil were often used interchangeably by colourists.

Hand-coloured photographs sometimes include the combined use of dyes, water-colours, oils, and other pigments to create varying effects on the printed image. Regardless of which medium is used, the main tools to apply colour are the brush and fingertip. Often the dabbing finger is covered to ensure that no fingerprints are left on the image.

== Preservation and storage ==
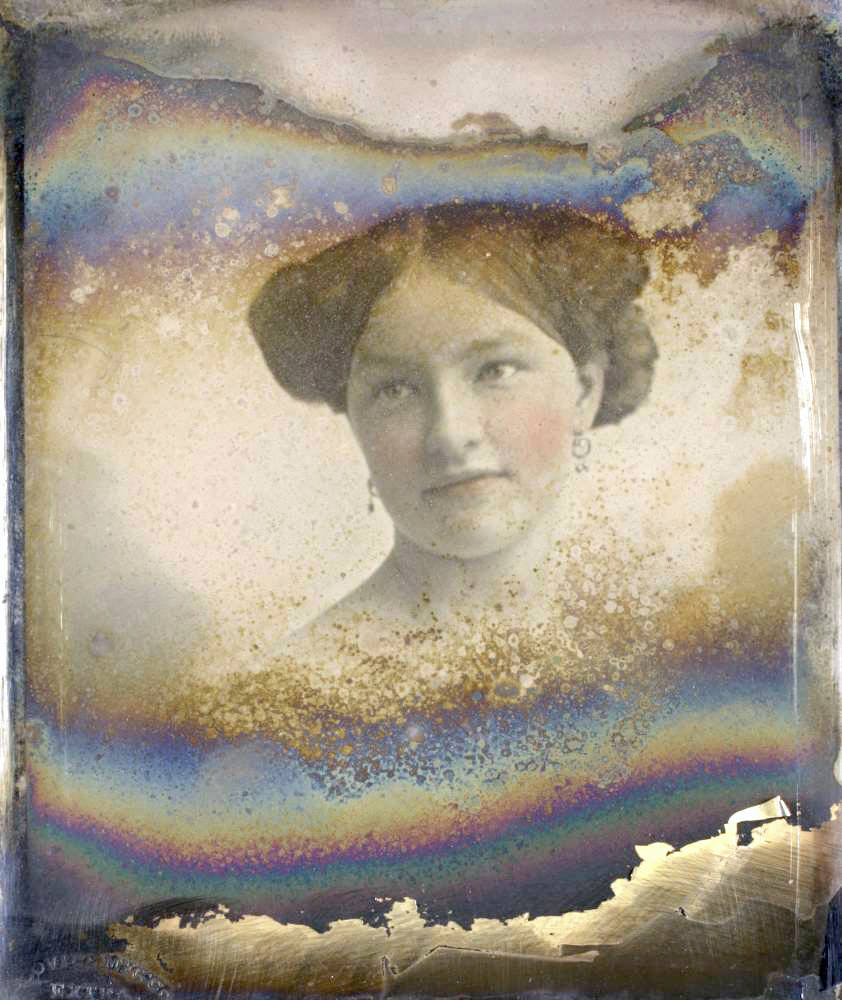
A tarnished hand-coloured daguerreotype (c. 1852) from the George Eastman House in Rochester, NY.

In general, the preservation of hand-coloured photographs is similar to that of colour and monochrome photography. Optimal storage conditions include an environmentally controlled climate with low relative humidity (approximately 30-40% RH), temperatures under 68 degrees Fahrenheit (20 degrees Celsius), and a low concentration of particulate pollution, such as sulphuric acid, nitric acid, and ozone. The storage area must also be clean and free of pests and mould. Because hand-coloured photographs, like colour photographs, are more sensitive to light and UV radiation, storage should be in a dark location. The storage area should be secure and monitored for internal threats – such as change in temperature or humidity due to HVAC malfunction, as well as external threats, such as theft or natural disaster. A disaster plan should be created and maintained for all materials.

When handling cased photographs such as daguerreotypes, albumen prints, and tintypes, especially ones that have been hand-coloured, caution is required. They are fragile and even minimal efforts to clean them can irreparably damage the image. Hand-coloured cased photographs should be stored horizontally, in a single layer, preferably faced down. Cases can be wrapped with alkaline or buffered tissue paper. If the photograph has become separated from its case, a mat and backing board can be cut from alkaline buffered museum board. The mat is placed between the image and a newly cut glass plate while the backing board supports the image from behind. This "sandwich" is then sealed with Filmoplast tape. Commercial glass cleaners should not be used on new glass plates. Loose hand-coloured tintypes can be placed between mat boards. If bent, no attempt should be made to straighten them as this could cause the emulsion to crack and/or lift.

Ideally, all photographic prints should be stored horizontally, although prints under 11"x14" and on stable mounts can be safely stored vertically. Prints should be stored away from light and water sources in acid-free, lignin-free boxes manufactured conforming to International Organization for Standardization (ISO) Standards 14523 (superseded in 2007 by ISO 18916) and 10214. Storage materials should pass the American National Standards Institute (ANSI) Photographic Activity Test (PAT), or similar standards, to ensure archival quality. If a photograph exhibits flaking or chipping emulsion it should not be stored in a plastic enclosure as static electricity could further damage the image. Clean cotton gloves should be worn when handling photographs to prevent skin oils and salts from damaging the surfaces.

In some cases, it may be necessary to contact a professional conservator. In the United States, the American Institute for Conservation of Historic and Artistic Works (AIC) provides a tool that helps identify local conservation services. In the United Kingdom and Ireland, the Conservation Register provides a similar tool that searches by specialization, business, and surname. To locate other conservation services internationally, Conservation OnLine (CoOL) Resources for Conservation Professionals provides a tool that searches by country.

=== Colouring materials ===
Dyes and watercolours require similar preservation measures when applied to hand-coloured photographs. Like the photographs themselves, watercolours and dyes applied by hand to photographs are susceptible to light damage and must be housed in dark storage or displayed under dim, indirect light. Common particulate pollutants can cause watercolour pigments to fade, but the paint surface can be cleaned by lightly dusting with a soft brush to remove dirt.

Oil paint was often applied to tintypes, daguerreotypes, and ambrotypes. As with all photographs, the materials respond negatively to direct light sources, which can cause pigments to fade and darken, and frequent changes in relative humidity and temperature, which can cause the oil paint to crack. For photographs with substantial damage, the expertise of an oil paintings conservator might be required for treatment.

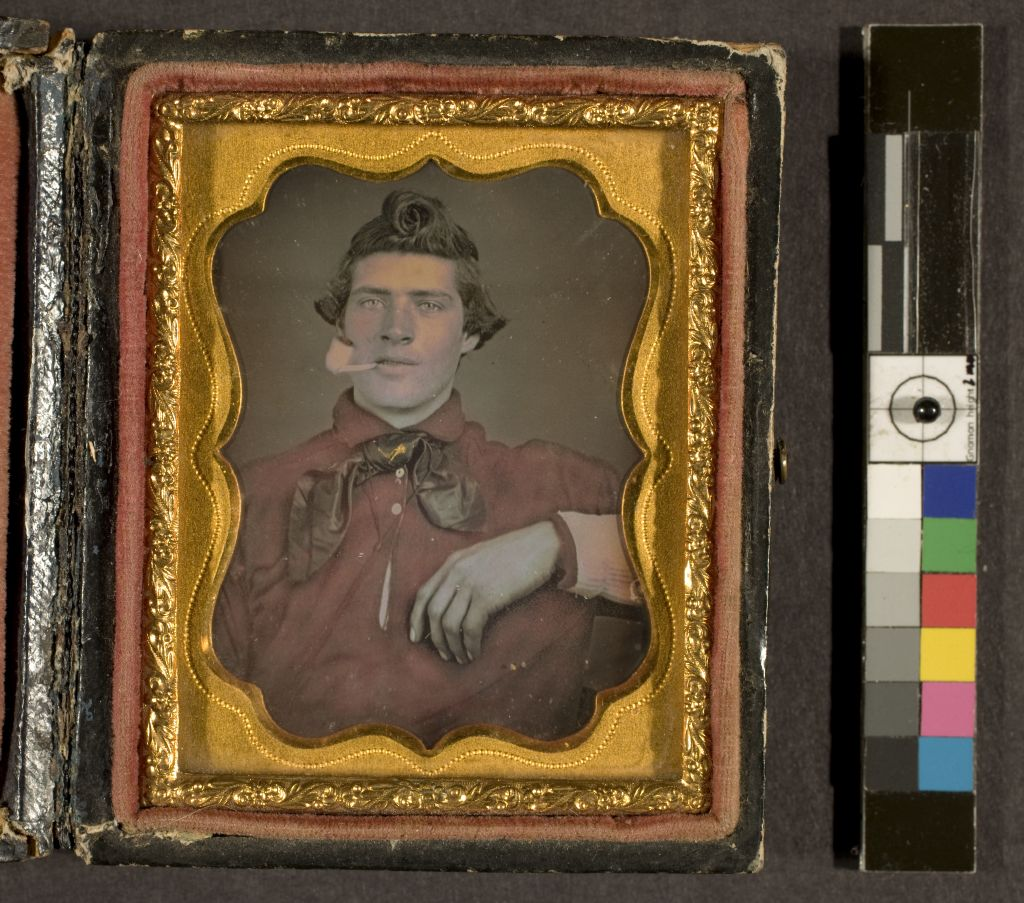
A framed hand-coloured daguerreotype (c. 1850) from the George Eastman House in Rochester, NY.

Crayon and pastel hand-coloured photographs have a powdery surface which must be protected for preservation purposes. Historically, crayon and pastel coloured photographs were sold in a frame under a protective layer of glass, which was often successful in reducing the amount of handling and smudging of the photograph surface. Any conservation work on crayon or pastel colour-photographs must retain these original frames and original glass to maintain the authenticity and value of the object. If the photograph is separated from its original enclosure, it can be stored in an archival quality folder until it is framed or cased.

=== Auxiliary materials ===
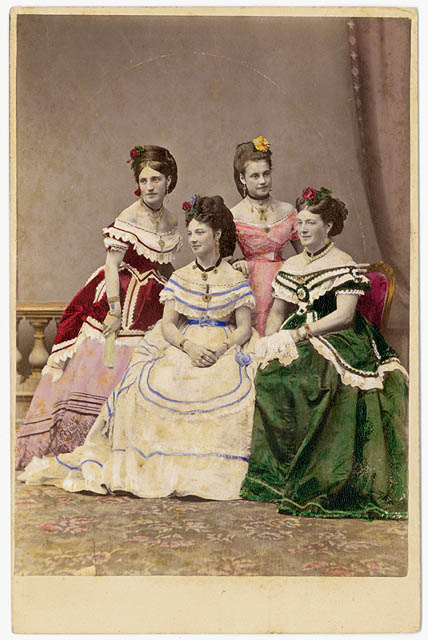
Hand-coloured cabinet photograph (c. 1875) from the State Library of New South Wales. The photograph is mounted to a paper backing sheet and shows evidence of degradation.

In the United States, many commercially sold, hand-coloured photographs were packaged and framed for retail sale. Early 20th century hand-coloured photographs were often mounted on mat-board, placed behind a glass frame, and backed by wood panel slats, cardboard, or heavy paperboard. A backing sheet was often glued to the back of the mat-board. Unfortunately, the paper products produced and used during the late-19th and early-20th centuries are highly acidic and will cause yellowing, brittling and degradation of hand-coloured photographs. Metallic inclusions in the paper can also oxidize which may be the cause of foxing in paper materials. Wood panel slats will also off-gas causing further degradation of the photographs.

Simple conservation of these fragile materials can be carried out by the adventurous amateur. A hand-coloured photograph should be removed from the frame, retaining any original screws or nails holding the frame together. Wood panels, acidic cardboard slats, and acidic backing paper can be removed from the frame and mat-board and discarded, retaining any identifying information such as stamps or writing on the backing paper. The mat-board on which the photograph is mounted, even though acidic in nature, cannot be removed and replaced due to the intrinsic value of this original mounting. Often the artist's signature and the title of the photograph are inscribed on the mat-board. The best way to limit degradation is to store the photograph in a cool, dry atmosphere with low light. The hand-coloured photograph should be replaced in its original frame, held in place with archival quality acid-free paper paperboard, and closed with the original nails or screws.

== Related techniques ==
Hand-colouring should be distinguished from tinting, toning, retouching, and crystoleum.

- Tinted photographs are made with dyed printing papers produced by commercial manufacturers. A single overall colour underlies the image and is most apparent in the highlights and mid-tones. From the 1870s albumen printing papers were available in pale pink or blue, and from the 1890s gelatine-silver printing-out papers in pale mauve or pink were available. There were other kinds of tinted papers as well. Over time such colouration often becomes very faded.
- Toning refers to a variety of methods for altering the overall colour of the photographic image itself. Compounds of gold, platinum or other metals are used in combination with variations in development time, temperature and other factors to produce a range of tones, including warm browns, purples, sepias, blues, olives, red-browns and blue-blacks. A well-known type of toning is sepia tone. Besides adding colour to a monochromatic print, toning often improves image stability and increases contrast.
- Retouching uses many of the same tools and techniques as hand-colouring, but with the intent of covering damage, hiding unwanted features, accentuating details, or adding missing elements in a photographic print. In a portrait retouching could be used to improve a sitter's appearance, for instance, by removing facial blemishes, and in a landscape with an overexposed sky, clouds could be painted into the image. Water-colours, inks, dyes, and chemical reducers are used with such tools as scalpels, pointed brushes, airbrushes, and retouching pencils.
- The crystoleum process, from "crystal" + "oleum" (oil), was yet another method of applying colour to albumen prints. The print was pasted face down to the inside of a concave piece of glass. Once the adhesive (usually starch paste or gelatine) was dry, the paper backing of the print was rubbed away, leaving only the transparent emulsion on the glass. The image was then coloured by hand. Another piece of glass was added to the back and this could also be coloured by hand. Both pieces of glass were bound together creating a detailed, albeit fragile, image.

== See also ==
- Film colorization
  - List of early color feature films
- Film tinting
- Handschiegl colour process
- Photochrom(e)
- Photograph conservation
- Photo manipulation
- Preservation (library and archival science)
- Selective colour
