= Albumen print =

Photographic process

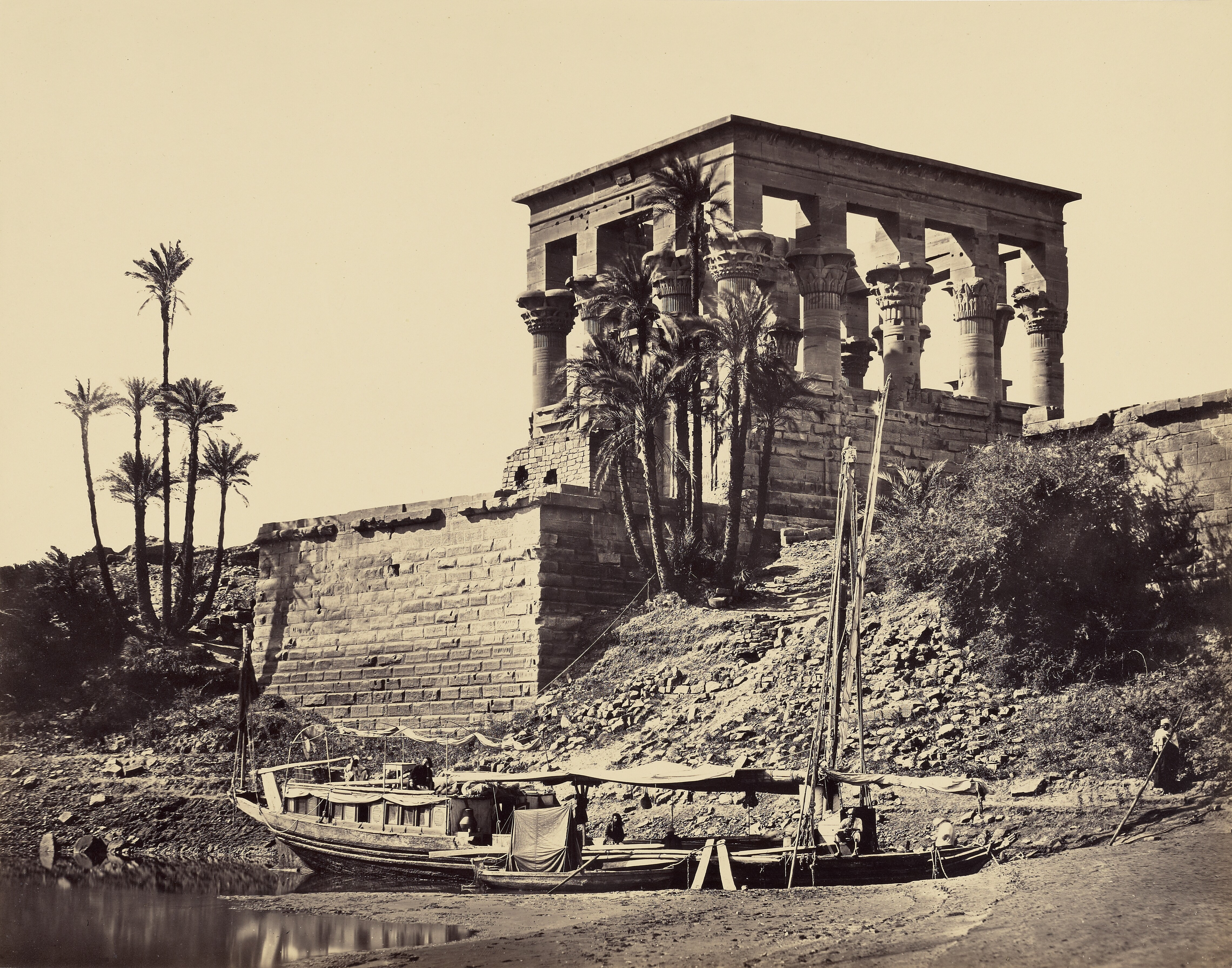
The Hypaethral Temple, Philae, by Francis Frith, 1857; medium: albumen print, original size 38.2×49.0 cm; from the collection of the National Galleries of Scotland

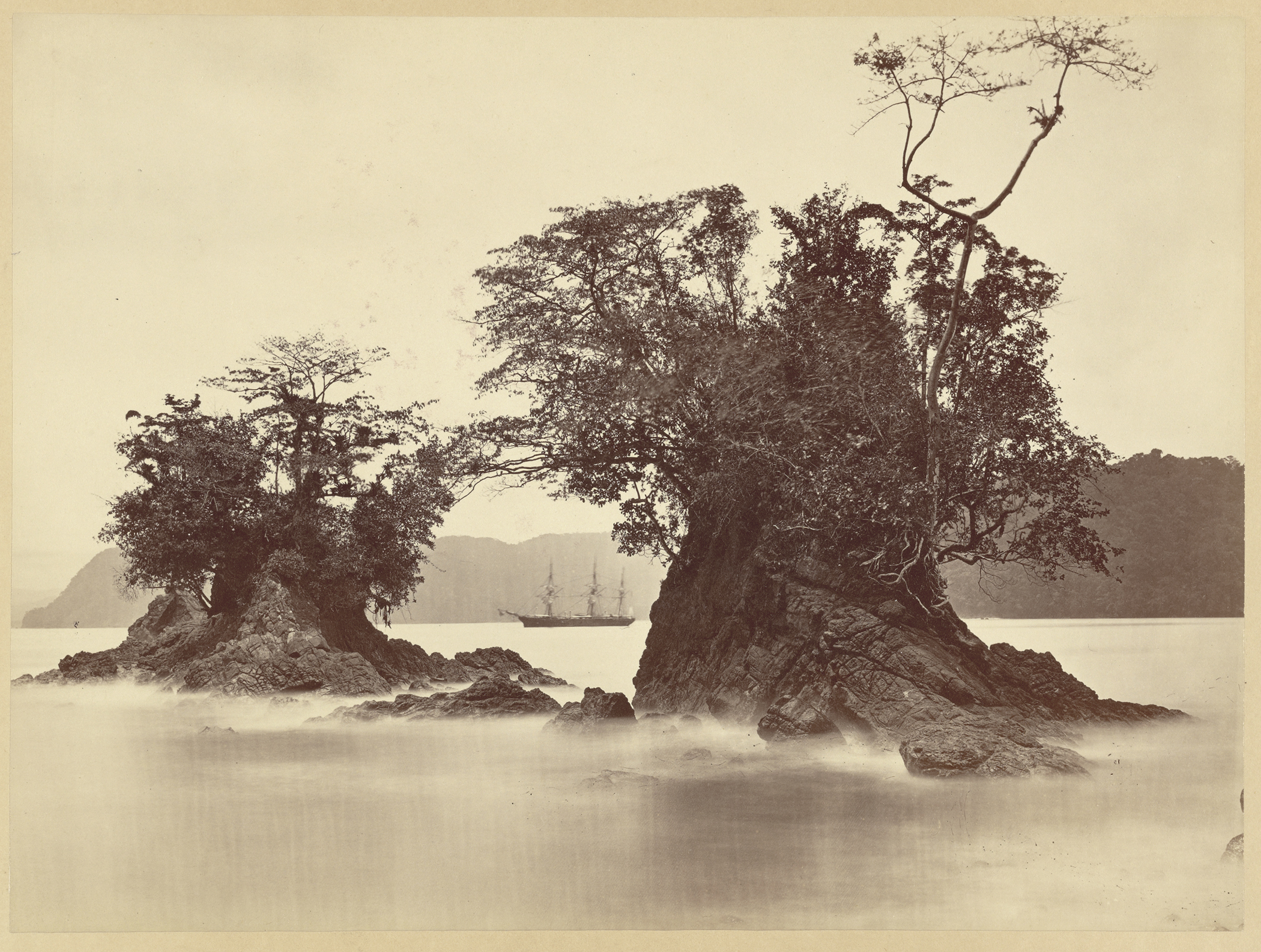
John Moran's albumen print of Limon Bay, High Tide., 1871, albumen silver print, original size 7 15/16 × 10 5/8 in. (20.2 × 27 cm), J. Paul Getty Museum, Los Angeles, California

The albumen print, also called albumen silver print, is a method of producing a photographic print using egg whites. Introduced by Louis Désiré Blanquart-Evrard, who described it to the French Academy of Sciences on 27 May 1850, it was the first commercial process of producing a photo on a paper base from a negative. It developed from the earlier salt print: the albumen coating holds the silver image on the surface of the paper rather than in its fibres, giving a sharp image with fine detail on a smooth, glossy surface. It became the dominant form of photographic positives from 1855 to the start of the 20th century, with a peak in the 1860–1890 period. During the mid-19th century, the carte de visite became one of the more popular uses of the albumen method. In the 19th century, E. & H. T. Anthony & Company were the largest makers and distributors of albumen photographic prints and paper in the United States.

== Creation process ==
1. A piece of paper, usually 100% cotton, is coated with an emulsion of egg white (albumen) and salt (sodium chloride or ammonium chloride), then dried. The albumen seals the paper and creates a slightly glossy surface for the sensitizer to rest on.
2. The paper is then dipped in a solution of silver nitrate and water, which renders the surface sensitive to UV rays.
3. The paper is then dried in the absence of UV rays.
4. The dried, prepared paper is placed in a frame in direct contact under a negative. The negative is traditionally a glass negative with collodion emulsion, but this step can be performed with a modern silver halide negative, too. The paper with the negative is then exposed to light until the image achieves the desired level of darkness, which is typically a little lighter than the end product. The progress of the print can be checked during the exposure, as it is a printing-out process, and the image can be seen taking form as it is being exposed to light. Though direct sunlight was used long ago, a UV exposure unit is often used contemporarily because it is more predictable, as the paper is most sensitive to ultraviolet.
5. A bath of sodium thiosulfate fixes the print's exposure, preventing further darkening.
6. Optional gold or selenium toning improves the photograph's tone and stabilizes against fading. Depending on the toner, toning may be performed before or after fixing the print.

Because the image emerges as a direct result of exposure to light, without the aid of a developing solution, an albumen print may be said to be a printed rather than a developed photograph.

The table salt (sodium chloride) in the albumen emulsion forms silver chloride when in contact with silver nitrate. Silver chloride is unstable when exposed to light, which makes it decompose into silver and chlorine. The silver ion (Ag^{+}) is reduced to silver (Ag) by the addition of an electron during the development/printing process, and the remaining silver chloride is washed out during fixing. The black parts of the image are formed by metallic silver (Ag).
