= Horie Kuwajirō =

Japanese photographer

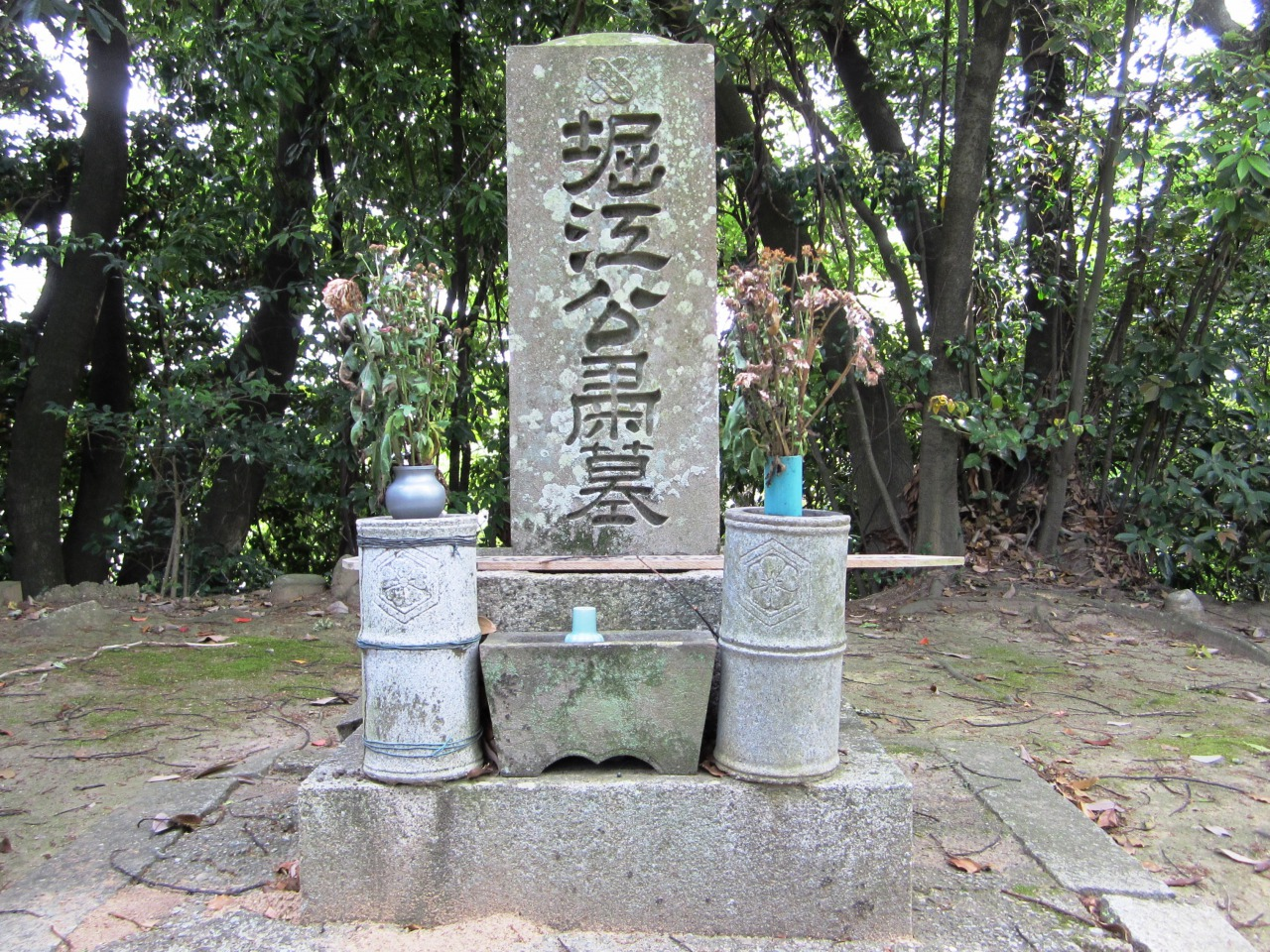
- Grave of Horie Kuwajirō at Shitenno-ji temple in Tsu, Mie
- Born: 1831
- Died: 1866 (aged 34–35)
- Occupation: Photographer

Horie Kuwajirō (堀江 鍬次郎; 1831–1866) was an early Japanese photographer and science writer.

Horie studied rangaku, specifically chemistry, at the Nagasaki Naval Training Center where J. L. C. Pompe van Meerdervoort was an instructor. In addition to chemistry, Pompe van Meerdervoort taught photography. When Swiss photographer Pierre Rossier arrived in Japan in 1858 on a commission from Negretti and Zambra, he taught wet-collodion process photography to Horie and others, including his friend Ueno Hikoma (1838–1904) and Maeda Genzō (1831–1906). It is possible that Horie accompanied Rossier around Nagasaki while the latter took photographs of priests, beggars, the audience of a sumo match, the foreign settlement, and a group portrait of Philipp Franz von Siebold's son Alexander and several samurai.

In 1860 or 1861 Horie bought a wet-plate camera. The purchase, which included photographic chemicals, was funded by the daimyō of the Tsu Domain, Tōdō Takayuki, and the price was 150 ryō. Apparently the photographic equipment was of such interest to Ueno that he chose to become a subject of Tsu Domain in order to have access to it at the clan residence in Edo. In 1861 Horie photographed Ueno at work in the Tsu Domain's laboratory in Edo (now Tokyo). In 1862 Ueno and Horie co-wrote a textbook titled Shamitsu Kyoku Hikkei that comprised translated extracts from ten Dutch science manuals and which included an appendix titled Satsueijutsu [The Technique of Photography] describing techniques of collodion process photography as well as Nicéphore Niépce's asphalt printing method. The appendix also provided the first published account in Japan of lithographic printing. Horie himself taught pharmacology to Uchida Kuichi, who later became a celebrated photographer in his own right.
