= Abel Gower =

British diplomat (1836-?)

Abel Anthony James Gower (1836 in Livorno, Italy – 1899?) was a British consul at two posts in Japan during the Bakumatsu period: Nagasaki and Hakodate. He was also an amateur photographer.

After experience in China, Gower worked in the British legation at Tōzen-ji, Edo (later Tokyo), as part of the staff of Rutherford Alcock. In 1863 he was involved in the bombardment of Kagoshima. In 1866 he became consul in Hakodate (in Ezo, later Hokkaidō); he had previously been consul in Nagasaki (in Kyūshū).

For many years it was believed that either Gower or Walter B. Woodbury was commissioned by the London firm Negretti and Zambra to photograph China and Japan between 1857 and 1860. It is now known that Pierre Rossier was the photographer in question. The Leiden University photograph collection includes a portrait of Gower, signed "P. Rossier", and in 1859 Rossier and Gower shared passage on HMS Sampson from Nagasaki to Edo.

== See also ==
- British Japan Consular Service
