= Maeda Genzō =

Japanese photographer

Maeda Genzō (前田 玄造) (1831–1906) was a Japanese photographer from northern Kyūshū. In Nagasaki he studied photography under Jan Karel van den Broek and J. L. C. Pompe van Meerdervoort. Neither of these teachers was an experienced photographer, and their attempts to produce photographs were largely failures. Nevertheless, in turn they taught wet-collodion process to Maeda and his fellow students, who included Furukawa Shumpei, Kawano Teizō, Ueno Hikoma, and Horie Kuwajirō, among others. When Swiss photographer Pierre Rossier arrived in Japan in 1858 on a commission from Negretti and Zambra, Maeda was instructed to assist and accompany him and to further learn photography. Maeda and other students escorted Rossier around Nagasaki, while the latter took photographs of priests, beggars, the audience of a sumo match, the foreign settlement, and the group portrait of Alexander von Siebold and samurai. Rossier believed that Pompe van Meerdervoort's failures in photography were due to a lack of the necessary chemicals and so he provided Maeda with a letter of recommendation to procure photographic apparatus and chemicals from a source in Shanghai. Both Maeda and Furukawa bought lenses, chemicals and albumen paper through Rossier. Maeda and Furukawa succeeded in taking a photograph with these materials on 28 October 1860, a day which is still commemorated in Fukuoka where the photograph was taken.
