= Kameya Tokujirō =

Japanese photographer

Kameya Tokujirō (龜谷 徳次郎; 1825–1884) was a Japanese photographer. Kameya's original surname was Abe (阿部); he was adopted by a family named Kameya. He learned photography at Deshima, the Dutch enclave in the harbour of Nagasaki where physicians Jan Karel van den Broek and J. L. C. Pompe van Meerdervoort taught photography in addition to medicine and chemistry. In turn, Kameya taught photography to Tomishige Rihei, who became his apprentice in 1862. The same year, Kameya moved to Kyoto to open a photographic studio – the first commercial studio in the city. In 1868, he returned to Nagasaki, where he operated a studio until his death. He died in 1884 in Vladivostok, having opened a branch studio there.

Kameya had a daughter, Kameya Toyo (龜谷とよ, 1852–1885), who assisted him in his Nagasaki studio and was one of Japan's first woman photographers. In 1871, she married Yoshii Teijirō (吉井禎次郎), whom the family adopted and who took the name Kameya Teijirō; he also worked at the Nagasaki studio, later opening and operating a branch studio in Korea until his death in 1885.

Kameya Tokujirō may have opened his Nagasaki studio before his 1862 move to Kyoto, and if so it may predate that of Ueno Hikoma as the earliest in the city.
