= Raizō =

- Gender: Male

Origin
- Region of origin: Japanese

Raizō, Raizo or Raizou (written: 頼三, 来蔵, or 雷蔵) is a masculine Japanese given name. Notable people with the name include:

- Raizo Ichikawa, Japanese film and kabuki actor
- Raizo Matsuno (松野 頼三; 1917–2006), Japanese politician
- Raizō Tanaka, admiral in the Imperial Japanese Navy during World War II
- Morita Raizō (守田 来蔵; 1830–1889), Japanese photographer
