= Tokujirō =

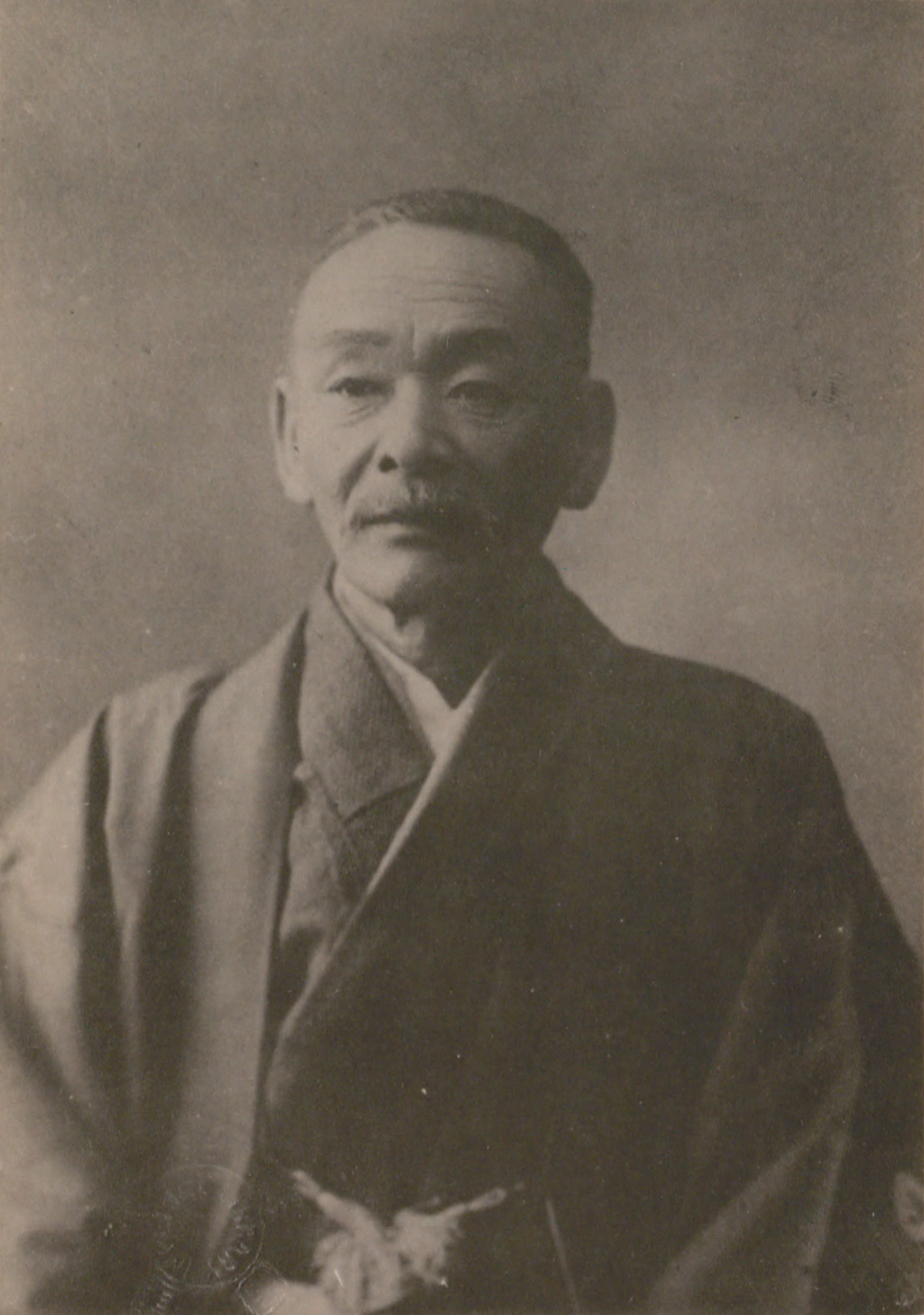
- Tokujiro Nishi (1847–1912), Japanese politician and diplomat
- Pronunciation: tokɯdʑiɾoɯ (IPA)
- Gender: Male

Origin
- Origin: Japanese
- Meaning: Different meanings depending on the kanji used

Other names
- Alternative spelling: Tokuziro (Kunrei-shiki) Tokuziro (Nihon-shiki) Tokujirō, Tokujiro, Tokujirou, Tokujiroh (Hepburn)

Tokujirō is a masculine Japanese given name.

== Written forms ==
Tokujirō can be written using different combinations of kanji characters. Some examples:

The characters used for "jiro" (二郎 or 次郎) literally means "second son" and usually used as a suffix to a masculine name, especially for the second child. The "toku" part of the name can use a variety of characters, each of which will change the meaning of the name ("徳" for benevolence, "得" for gain, "篤" and so on).

- 徳二郎, "benevolence, second son"
- 徳次郎, "benevolence, second son"
- 得二郎, "gain, second son"
- 篤次郎, "sincere, second son"
- 啄二郎, "peck, second son"

Other combinations...

- 徳治郎, "benevolence, to manage/cure, son"
- 徳次朗, "benevolence, next, clear"
- 得治郎, "gain, to manage/cure, son"
- 篤次朗, "sincere, next, clear"
- 竺次朗, "bamboo, next, clear"

The name can also be written in hiragana とくじろう or katakana トクジロウ.

== Notable people with the name ==
- Tokujirō Kameya (龜谷 徳次郎; 1825–1884), Japanese photographer
- Tokujiro Kanamori (金森 徳次郎; 1886–1959), Japanese politician
- Tokujirō Nishi (西 徳二郎; 1847–1912), Japanese politician and diplomat
