= Ueno Hikoma =

Japanese photographer (1838–1904)

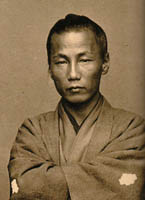
- Ueno c. 1870s, self-portrait (Note: This is a detail of a self-portrait with family; the photograph is reproduced in its entirety in Anne Wilkes Tucker, et al. The History of Japanese Photography (New Haven: Yale University Press, 2003), pp. 38–9.)
- Born: October 15, 1838; Nagasaki, Hizen Province, Japan
- Died: May 22, 1904 (aged 65); Nagasaki, Nagasaki Prefecture, Japan
- Occupation: Photographer

Ueno Hikoma (Note: Ueno is the surname. Within text in English, Ueno is sometimes rendered “Uyeno” (a matter of an old romanization system, and not of different pronunciation); and the full name is often written in reverse order, with given name first and family name last.) (上野 彦馬; October 15, 1838 – May 22, 1904) was a pioneer Japanese photographer, born in Nagasaki. He is noted for his fine portraits, often of important Japanese and foreign figures, and for his excellent landscapes, particularly of Nagasaki and its surroundings. Ueno was a major figure in nineteenth-century Japanese photography as a commercially and artistically successful photographer and as an instructor.

== Background, youth, and preparation ==
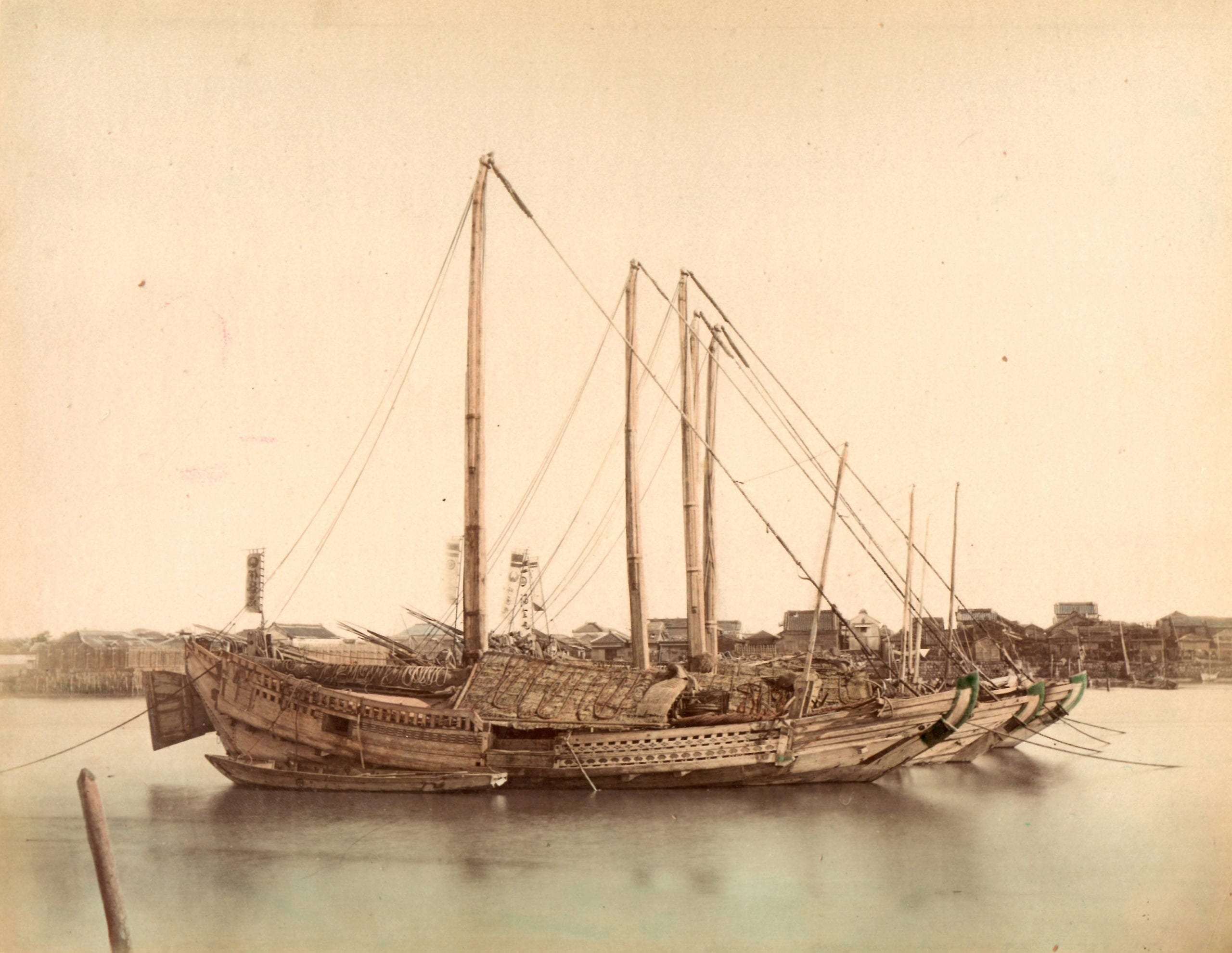
View of boats. Albumen silver print, nineteenth century.

Ueno Hikoma's family background perhaps provided an early impetus for his eventual career. (Note: Much of this biography derives from material by Kinoshita Naoyuki and Luisa Orto in Tucker et al., The History of Japanese Photography, pp. 20–21, 366.) A number of family members had been portrait painters. Furthermore, he was the son of Ueno Toshinojō (also known as Ueno Shunnojō) (1790–1851), a merchant in the employ of the Shimazu clan who in 1848 imported possibly the first camera in the country, a daguerreotype camera for the Shimazu daimyō, Nariakira. (Note: Ueno Toshinojō was thought until recently to have been the first person to take a daguerreotype in Japan, in 1841.)

Ueno Hikoma first studied Chinese classics; then in 1852, not long after his father's death, he entered the Nagasaki Medical College with a view to studying chemistry in order to help him run the family business, dealing in nitre and chintz dyeing. He eventually studied chemistry under the Dutch naval medical officer Johannes L. C. Pompe van Meerdervoort (1829–1908) after the latter's arrival in 1857. Pompe van Meerdervoort, who had a camera and photography manual though little experience as a photographer, also instructed Ueno Hikoma in photography.

It was only after his contact with Swiss photographer Pierre Rossier (1829 – ca. 1890) that Ueno decided to pursue a career as a photographer. Rossier had been commissioned by the firm Negretti and Zambra to photograph in Asia and he worked in Japan from 1859 to 1860. He was only in Nagasaki for a short time, but while there he taught wet-collodion process photography to Ueno, Horie Kuwajirō (1831–1866), Maeda Genzō (1831–1906) and others. Soon after, Ueno's friend Horie bought a wet-plate camera. The purchase, which included photographic chemicals, was funded by the daimyō of Tsu Domain, Tōdō Takayuki, and the price was 150 ryō. Apparently the photographic equipment was of such interest to Ueno that he chose to become a subject of the Tsu Domain in order to have access to it at the domainal residence in Edo. and in 1861 Horie photographed Ueno at work in the domain's laboratory in Edo (now Tokyo). In 1862 Ueno and Horie co-wrote a textbook titled Shamitsu Kyoku Hikkei that comprised translated extracts from ten Dutch science manuals and which included an appendix titled Satsueijutsu [The Technique of Photography] that described techniques of collodion process photography as well as Nicéphore Niépce's asphalt printing method. (Note: The appendix also provided the first published account in Japan of lithographic printing. Himeno, p. 24. Bennett gives the transliterated title of the book as Seimikyoku Hikkei, "A Handbook to Science". Bennett (1996), p. 49; Bennett, The Search for Rossier.)

== Career ==
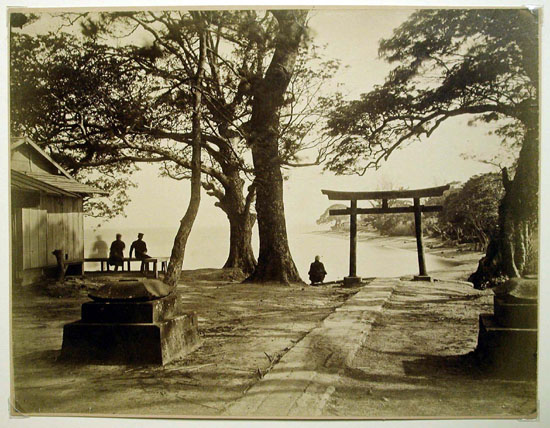
Torii and lake. Albumen silver print, between 1860 and 1900.

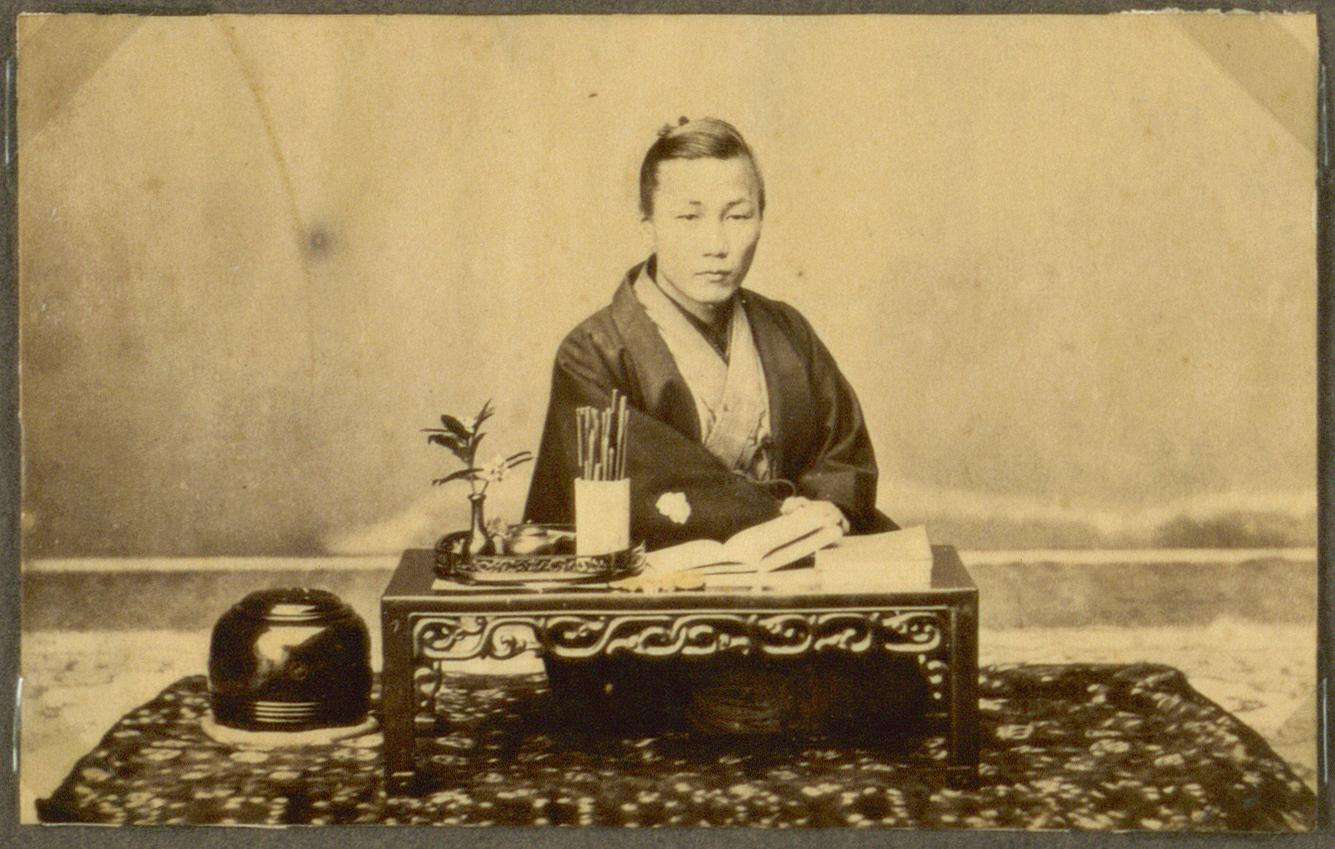
Ueno in Nagasaki in 1868

After his time working for the Tsu Domain in Edo, Ueno returned to Nagasaki, but finding that Pompe van Meerdervoort had left the country, he gave up rangaku, or the study of Western science. He decided to make a career as a photographer.

In the autumn of 1862 Ueno opened a commercial photographic studio by the Nakashima River in Nagasaki and he also began importing cameras.

At first the business was unsuccessful, but it gradually grew, allowing the studio to move to a large and well-lit building in 1882, becoming popular with Japanese and foreign notables and receiving mention in guidebooks, in Edmond Cotteau's Un touriste dans l'Extrême-Orient (1884) and in Pierre Loti's novel, Madame Chrysanthème (1887). The patronage of foreigners in turn greatly increased Ueno's income, which allowed him to use more expensive materials and to expand his studios. Still in the early days of this imported technology, Ueno overcame the reticence of many Japanese to be photographed and took portraits of such figures as Sakamoto Ryōma, Itō Shunsuke, Takasugi Shinsaku, (Note: All photographed between 1865 and 1867) and Katsu Kaishū. During their visits to Japan Ueno photographed Ulysses S. Grant in 1879 and the Russian crown prince (later Tsar Nicholas II) in 1891. With the help of such patronage, Ueno's studio operated until the end of the century.

Ueno had an important and close working relationship with Felice Beato. When visiting Nagasaki, Beato used Ueno's studio and photographed his younger sister and acquaintances, amongst other residents of the city. Beato also photographed Ueno himself at the Daikōji temple and the two photographers apparently exchanged photographs. (Note: Beato also photographed Ueno with a group at Zōjō-ji temple in Shiba in Edo. Himeno, p. 24.) Ueno probably refined his technique during his contact with the experienced Beato. Two other foreign visitors to Japan who influenced Ueno were the Dutch photographer Konrad Walter Gratama, who added to Ueno's knowledge of chemistry in 1866, and the Austrian photographer Wilhelm Burger who seems to have taught photographic techniques to Ueno while also making use of Ueno's studio to take some stereographs during his visit to the country in 1869–1870.

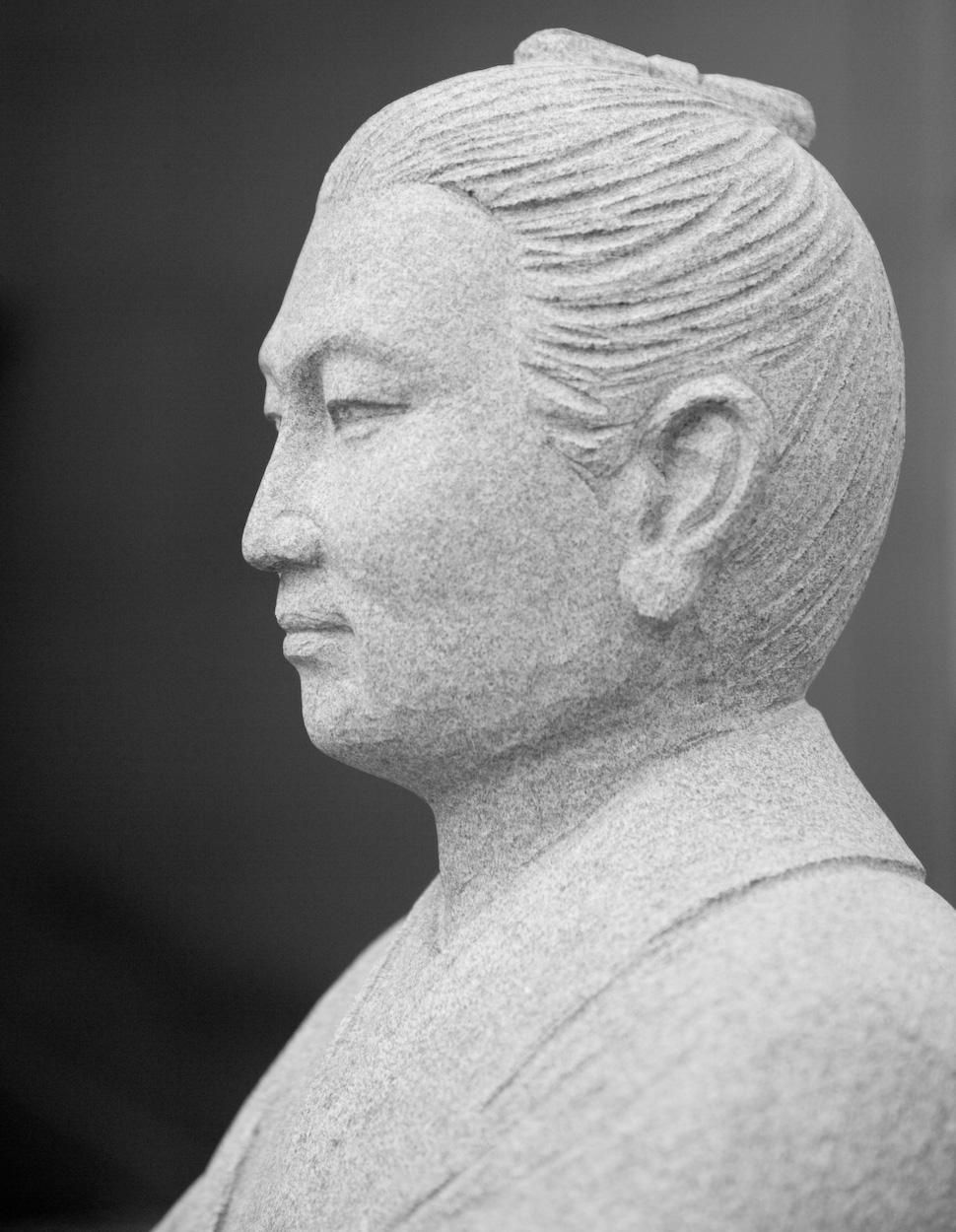
Statue of Ueno Hikoma in Nagasaki

Ueno himself taught many important nineteenth-century photographers, including Uchida Kuichi (1844–1875), Tomishige Rihei, (Note: Ueno and Tomishige had a close relationship. Himeno, p. 27.) Kameya Tokujirō, (Note: Kameya's daughter is noted as the first woman photographer in Japan.) (1837–1922), Nakajima Shinzō, Nagai Nagayoshi, Noguchi Jōichi, Nakajima Seimin, Tanaka, Morita Raizō, Kikizu Maturoku, and Ueno Yoshima. Ueno maintained a close relationship with Uchida, and following the latter's trip to Nagasaki in 1872 while photographing for the Emperor Meiji their albums include several identical images that they presumably exchanged. Eventually, Ueno opened branches of his photographic studio in Vladivostok in 1890 and in Shanghai and Hong Kong in 1891.

In addition to portraits, Ueno produced many images of Nagasaki and its surroundings. He also photographed the transit of Venus across the sun in 1874 for an American astronomical observation mission. In 1877, the governor of Nagasaki prefecture, Kitajima Hidetomo, commissioned him to take battlefield photographs in southwest Japan during the Satsuma Rebellion. For this commission Ueno was paid ¥330 for 420 prints. He was accompanied on this job by Setsu Shinichi and Noguchi Jōichi.

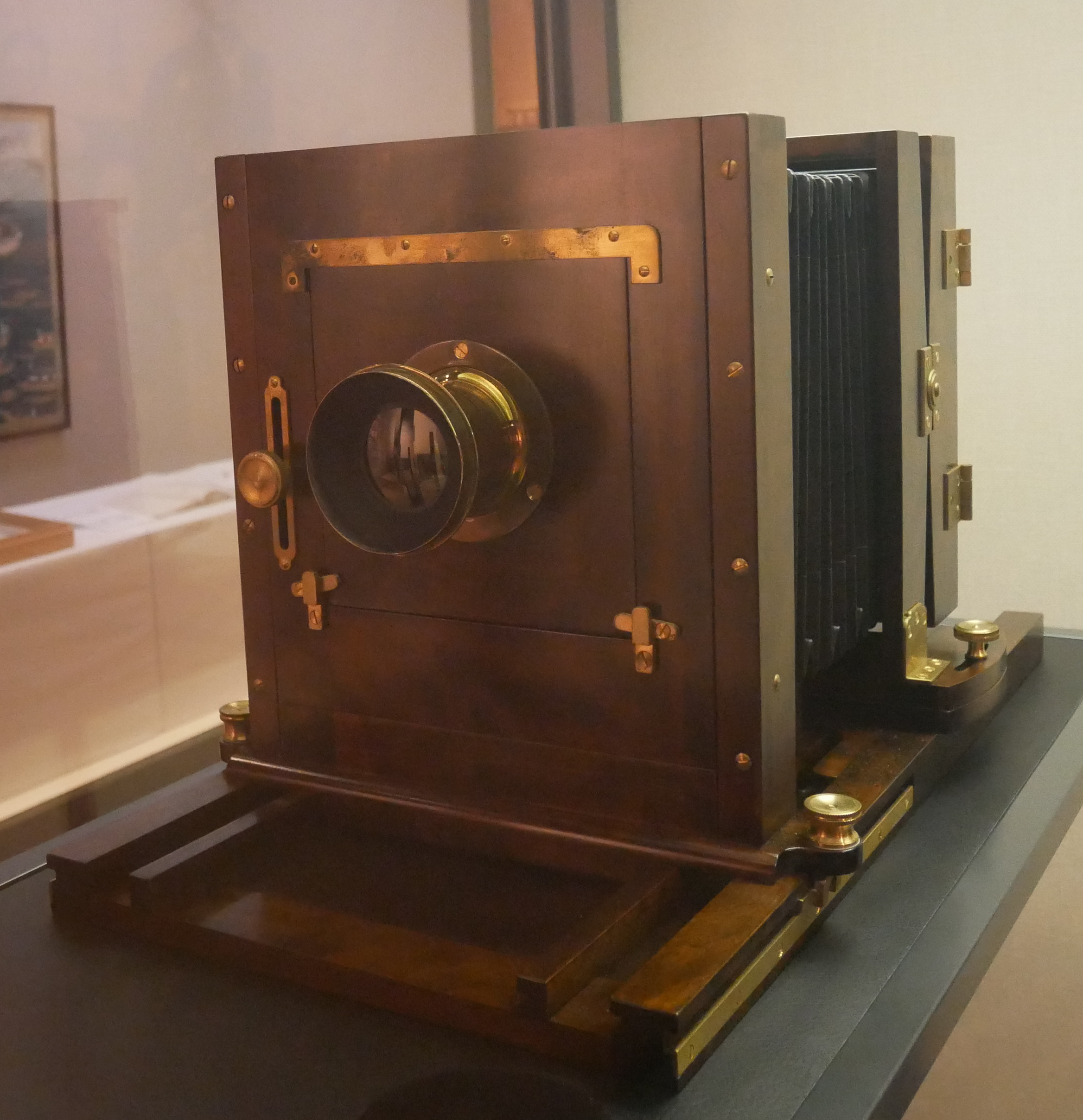
Camera used by Ueno Hikoma

He exhibited photographs in at least two World Expositions, the Vienna World Exposition of 1873 and the World Columbian Exposition of 1893 in Chicago, at which he won an award for “Good Taste and Artistic Finish”.

At first Ueno practiced wet-plate photography, but by about 1877 he began using imported Belgian dry plates. In spite of the contemporary popularity of hand-coloured photographs, Ueno's photographs are usually uncoloured. Some of Ueno's negatives were probably purchased at some point by the photographer Kusakabe Kimbei, as these images appear in the latter's albums. Though he apparently did not regularly offer photograph albums, he seems to have made some albums by special request for foreign customers. Ueno considered French and American photographic techniques and materials (for example, paper and lenses) to be superior to those of the British, whose products he also complained were overpriced, noting that albumen paper sold (c. 1868) for 100 ryō per box.

Eight of Ueno's photographs can be found online from the Freer Gallery of Art and Arthur M. Sackler Gallery Archives.

== Commemoration ==
In 2000 the “Kyushu Sangyo University Photo Contest” established the “Ueno Hikoma Award” to commemorate the 40th anniversary of the founding of Kyushu Sangyo University. The award is intended to discover and nurture emerging photographers.

== General references ==
- "Pompe van Meerdervoort, J. L. C., LC Control Number n 85206160". Anglo-American Name Authority File. Archived from the original on 2 May 2019.
- "Tomishige, Rihei, LC Control Number n 78032752". Anglo-American Name Authority File. Archived from the original on 2 May 2019.
- Bachmann Eckenstein Art & Antiques. Accessed 3 April 2006.
- Bennett, Terry. “The Search for Rossier: Early Photographer of China & Japan”. Accessed 3 April 2006.
- Canadian Centre for Architecture; Collections Online, s.v. “Uyeno, Hikoma”. Accessed 3 April 2006.
- Clark, John. Japanese Exchanges in Art, 1850s to 1930s with Britain, continental Europe, and the USA: Papers and Research Materials (Sydney: Power Publications, 2001), 89, 334–335.
- Kyushu Sangyo University; Kyushu Sangyo University Photo Contest; Ueno Hikoma Award. Accessed 3 April 2006.
- Musée Nicéphore Niépce; Collection du musée Niépce. Thé/Laque/Photographie. Accessed 3 April 2006. (in French)
- Nagasaki University Library; Japanese Old Photographs in Bakumatsu–Meiji Period, s.v. “Ueno, Hikoma”. Accessed 3 April 2006.
- Rousmaniere, Nicole Coolidge, and Mikiko Hirayama, eds. Reflecting Truth: Japanese Photography in the Nineteenth Century (Amsterdam: Hotei Publishing, 2004).
- Smithsonian Institution Collections Cross Search Center, Photographs by Ueno Hikoma, digitized
- Tucker, Anne Wilkes, and others. The History of Japanese Photography. New Haven: Yale University Press, 2003. ISBN 0-300-09925-8
