= Jun Matsumoto (disambiguation) =

Jun Matsumoto (born 1983) is a Japanese singer and actor.

Jun Matsumoto or Matsumoto Jun may also refer to:

- Jun Matsumoto (politician) (1950–2026), Japanese politician and parliament member
- Matsumoto Jun (physician) (1832–1907), Japanese physician
