= Matsumoto Ryōjun =

Japanese politician

Baron Matsumoto Jun
- 松本 順
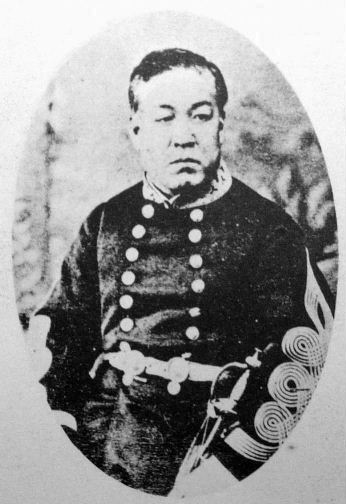
- Portrait of Matsumoto Jun
- Born: Sato Junnosuke; 13 July 1832; Edo, Musashi, Japan
- Died: 12 March 1907 (aged 74); Ōiso, Kanagawa, Japan
- Burial place: Myodai-ji, Ōiso, Kanagawa, Japan
- Other name: Matsumoto Ryōjun
- Children: Matsumoto Keitaro; Matsumoto Motomatsu
- Relatives: Sato Taizen (father); Matsumoto Ryoho (adoptive father); Hayashi Tadasu (brother)
- Military career
- Allegiance: Tokugawa bakufu Government of Meiji
- Branch: Shogunate Army; Imperial Japanese Army
- Rank: Surgeon general
- Conflicts: Second Chōshū expedition Boshin War

Member of the House of Peers
- In office 29 September 1890 – 12 March 1907 Nominated by the Emperor

Baron Matsumoto Jun (Japanese: 松本 順) (born Sato Junnosuke (佐藤 順之助); 13 July 1832 – 12 March 1907), previously known as Matsumoto Ryōjun (松本 良順), was a Japanese physician and photographer who served as the personal physician to the last shōgun, Tokugawa Yoshinobu. Foreign Minister Hayashi Tadasu was his brother and Navy Minister Enomoto Takeaki was his distant relative.

== Biography ==
Sato Junnosuke was born as the son of Sato Taizen, the domain physician of Sakura Domain, at the clan's Azabu residence in Edo on 13 July 1832. Later in 1849 he was adopted by another physician Matsumoto Ryōho and was renamed to Matsumoto Ryōjun. In 1850, his eldest son Keitaro is born.

He was sent to Nagasaki in 1857 to study rangaku, during which time he studied both western medicine and photography under the Dutch physician J. L. C. Pompe van Meerdervoort, though he was somewhat unimpressed with his instructor's skills, once describing the result of one of Pompe van Meerdervoort's photographic experiments as "a meagre black shadow". When the Swiss photographer Pierre Rossier arrived in Japan in 1859, Matsumoto ordered Maeda Genzō to assist Rossier. Maeda subsequently became a pioneering Japanese photographer. Another link between Matsumoto and photography dates from some point between 1857 and 1859 when he adopted the 13-year-old future photographer Uchida Kuichi.

In 1864 he moved to Kyoto to assist Aizu Domain daimyō Matsudaira Katamori during the latter's tenure as Kyoto Shugoshoku and helped modernize its medical practices. Matsumoto also befriended Shinsengumi leader Kondō Isami and rendered medical assistance to them. During the Second Chōshū expedition of 1866, he served as personal physician to the 14th Tokugawa shōgun, Tokugawa Iemochi.

During the Boshin War of the Meiji Restoration, he volunteered his services as an army medic accompanying the Shogunate Army. After the Battle of Aizu in 1868, he made his way to Sendai, and enlisted with the Ōuetsu Reppan Dōmei. Briefly imprisoned after the war by the new Meiji government, he was released through the efforts of Yamagata Aritomo, who asked him to help develop the medical corps of the fledgling Imperial Japanese Army. He established a Western-style hospital Ranjoin in Waseda, Tokyo.

During the Meiji era, he maintained his relations with former retainers of the Shogun. In 1871 as the recommendation from Yamagata Aritomo, he was conferred to the Ministry of War. He was accorded Senior Fifth Rank and was renamed to Matsumoto Jun. In 1873 he was made a Surgeon General of the Imperial Japanese Army. He was also instrumental in helping Sugimura Yoshie (formerly Nagakura Shinpachi) and Fujita Gorō (formerly Saitō Hajime) build a monument Grave of Shisengumi at Itabashi in Tokyo in 1875.

On 29 September 1890, he became a member in the House of Peers. He retired from the Imperial Army on 1 April 1902, and on 2 March 1905, he received the title of baron (danshaku) under the Kazoku peerage system. Matsumoto died on 12 March 1907, and he was interred at the temple of Myodai-ji in Ōiso, Kanagawa.
