= Pierre Rossier =

Swiss photographer (1829–1886)

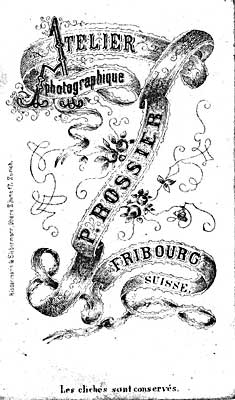
The mark of Pierre Rossier's photographic studio in Fribourg

Pierre Joseph Rossier (16 July 1829 – 22 October 1886) was a pioneering Swiss photographer whose albumen photographs, which include stereographs and cartes-de-visite, comprise portraits, cityscapes, and landscapes. He was commissioned by the London firm of Negretti and Zambra to travel to Asia and document the progress of the Anglo-French troops in the Second Opium War and, although he failed to join that military expedition, he remained in Asia for several years, producing the first commercial photographs of China, the Philippines, Japan and Siam (now Thailand). He was the first professional photographer in Japan, where he trained Ueno Hikoma, Maeda Genzō, Horie Kuwajirō, as well as lesser known members of the first generation of Japanese photographers. In Switzerland he established photographic studios in Fribourg and Einsiedeln, and he also produced images elsewhere in the country. Rossier is an important figure in the early history of photography not only because of his own images, but also because of the critical impact of his teaching in the early days of Japanese photography.

== Identity and origins ==
Until very recently, little was known about Rossier; even his given name was a mystery. In his own time he was sometimes referred to as "P. Rossier" and at other times as "M. Rossier". Documents discovered in the Fribourg town archives finally proved that his given name was Pierre, and it can be assumed that the "M" in "M. Rossier" stood for "Monsieur". He was long thought to be from France and while he was in Japan he was even referred to as an "Englishman"; however, recent research has revealed that Rossier was Swiss, born on 16 July 1829 in Grandsivaz, a small village in the Canton of Fribourg. He was the fourth of ten children of a farming family of modest means. At the age of sixteen he became a teacher at a school in a neighbouring village, but by 1855 he was issued a passport to visit France and England to work as a photographer.

At some point after leaving Switzerland and arriving in England, Rossier was commissioned by the firm of Negretti and Zambra to travel to China to photograph the Second Opium War (1858–1860). It may be that the firm considered Rossier's Swiss citizenship an asset for such a voyage, that his country's neutrality might help him find passage aboard either British or French ships. Taking into account the high costs and uncertainty incurred by the firm and the potential hazards for Rossier himself, this was an important commission.

== Photographing in Asia ==
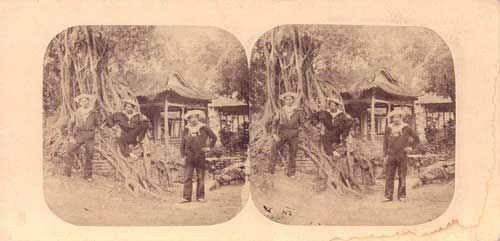
French Sailors at Canton, 1858. Stereograph, albumen silver prints.

Rossier was in Hong Kong in 1858, and he soon began taking photographs, mostly in and around Canton (now Guangzhou). In November 1859 Negretti and Zambra published a set of fifty of Rossier's views, including stereographs. These received favourable reviews in photographic periodicals of the day. In 1858 or 1859 Rossier travelled to the Philippines where he visited and photographed the Taal Volcano. Rossier was in Japan by 1859, producing photographs first in Nagasaki, then in Kanagawa, Yokohama and Edo (now Tokyo); he was the first professional photographer to arrive in Japan. One of the photographs Rossier took during the summer of 1859, while in Nagasaki, was a portrait of Philipp Franz von Siebold's son Alexander and a group of samurai from the Nabeshima clan.

At the end of June 1860, Rossier was in Shanghai, and it is likely that he visited the city in an attempt to gain permission to accompany the Anglo-French military expedition that had already arrived in northern China and thereby fulfill his commission to document the Second Opium War. If so, he was unsuccessful; both forces had already hired photographers to document the mission. The British forces were accompanied by the photographers Felice Beato and John Papillon, and the French by Antoine Fauchery, Lieutenant-Colonel Du Pin, and possibly also by Louis Legrand. Although Rossier failed even to embark on the mission he had been hired to document, he remained in East Asia for some time longer.

By October 1860, Rossier had returned to Nagasaki, where he took photographs of the harbour on behalf of the British Consul, George S. Morrison, for which Rossier was paid $70. Although Rossier's photographs of Japan were advertised by Negretti and Zambra on at least two occasions in 1860, the firm did not publish them until October or November 1861. Five of Rossier's views of Japan appeared earlier, in George Smith's book, Ten Weeks in Japan, in April 1861, and that July, eight of Rossier's Japan photographs appeared in the form of lithographs in Henry Arthur Tilley's book, Japan, the Amoor, and the Pacific. An 1861 edition of the Illustrated London News included several engravings under the collective title Domestic Life in China, the images having been taken from Rossier's stereographs. One of the photographs Negretti and Zambra had advertised in 1860 became the first commercial photograph taken in Japan to be published, and is the earliest known hand-coloured Japanese photograph.

Thanks to a number of documents of the time, it is now certain that Negretti and Zambra's photographs of China and Japan were taken by Rossier, but for many years it was thought that they might have been taken by either Walter B. Woodbury, who also had dealings with Negretti and Zambra but was based in Batavia (now Jakarta), or Abel Gower, who was an amateur photographer in Japan. The Leiden University photograph collection includes a portrait, allegedly of Gower, signed "P. Rossier", and in 1859 Rossier and Gower shared passage aboard HMS Sampson from Nagasaki to Edo.

== Teaching photography ==
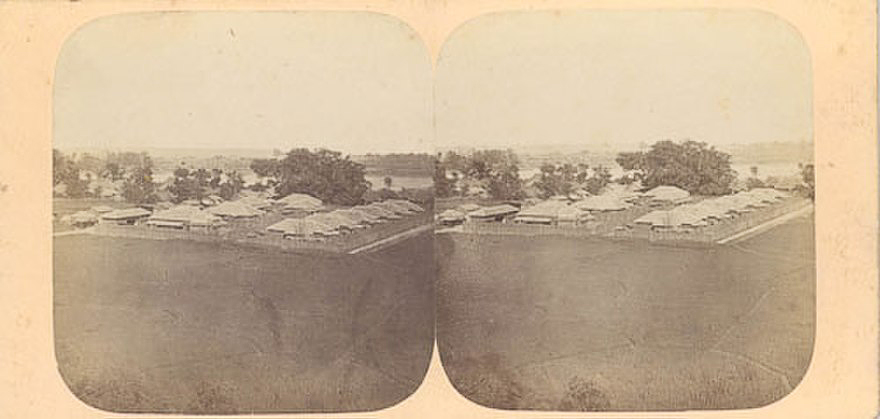
View of Yokohama, 1859. Stereograph, albumen silver prints.

Rossier first arrived in Japan in 1859, at a time when early experiments in photography were being conducted in Kyūshū, particularly in Nagasaki. The city was the centre of rangaku, the study of Western science, and it was here that physicians Jan Karel van den Broek and J. L. C. Pompe van Meerdervoort were instrumental in teaching their Japanese students not only medicine but also chemistry and photography. Neither Van den Broek nor Pompe van Meerdervoort was an experienced photographer, and their attempts to produce photographs were largely failures. Nevertheless, in turn they taught wet-collodion process photography to Keisai Yoshio, Furukawa Shumpei, Kawano Teizō, Maeda Genzō, Ueno Hikoma, and Horie Kuwajirō, among others.

On his arrival in Japan, Rossier presumably introduced himself as a photographer despatched to Japan by Negretti and Zambra, perhaps thereby inspiring a misconception, for while he remained in the country he was often referred to as an "English" photographer. In Nagasaki, Rossier was assisted in his work by Maeda Genzō, who had been instructed to accompany the "Englishman" and to further learn photography. With Maeda and other students escorting him around the city, Rossier took photographs of priests, beggars, the audience of a sumo match, the foreign settlement, and the group portrait of Alexander von Siebold and samurai. Rossier believed that Pompe van Meerdervoort's failures in photography were due to a lack of the necessary chemicals and so he provided Maeda with a letter of recommendation to procure photographic apparatus and chemicals from a source in Shanghai. Both Maeda and Furukawa bought lenses, chemicals and albumen paper through Rossier.

At this time, Ueno Hikoma and Horie Kuwajirō also received photographic instruction from Rossier. Apparently Ueno had originally intended to learn not only the practice of photography but also the manufacture of cameras. The encounter with Rossier seems to have convinced Ueno to pursue photography as a career, but he was so overwhelmed by the technology of the camera that he quickly dropped the notion of making one himself. Within a few months, he and Horie had purchased a French camera and chemicals, thereafter launching their independent photographic careers.

Although Rossier's time in Japan was brief and the surviving photographic legacy of his sojourn is scant, he nevertheless had a lasting impact on photography in the country.

== Later years ==
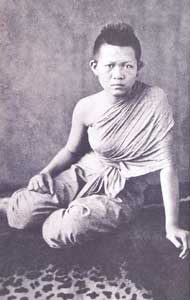
Portrait of a Siamese woman, c. 1861. Albumen silver print.

In 1861, Rossier was in Siam, where he assisted the French zoologist Firmin Bocourt by taking ethnographic portraits for the latter's scientific expedition of 1861–1862, and in 1863, Negretti and Zambra issued a series of 30 stereographic portraits and landscapes taken in Siam that are almost certainly the work of Rossier. In February 1862, Rossier was again in Shanghai, where he sold his cameras and other photographic equipment before embarking for Europe. During his time in Asia it is possible that Rossier photographed in India; Negretti and Zambra issued a series of views of India at about the same time as Rossier's China views.

Rossier returned to Switzerland in early 1862 and, in October 1865, married Catharine Barbe Kaelin (1843–1867). The couple had a son, Christophe Marie Pierre Joseph, who was born on 30 July 1866. Catharine died on 4 April 1867.

Rossier maintained a photographic studio in Fribourg until at least 1876 and he also had a studio in Einsiedeln. During the 1860s and 1870s, he produced a number of stereographs and cartes-de-visite comprising portraits and views of Fribourg, Einsiedeln and other places in Switzerland. An 1871 advertisement in the French-language Fribourg newspaper La Liberté offered photographs by Rossier of religious paintings by the artist Melchior Paul von Deschwanden. In 1872, Rossier applied for a passport to travel to France where he may have produced photographs. At some point between 1871 and 1884, he married again. His second wife, Marie Virginie Overney, was employed as a household servant by the landlords of his studio. They had a son, Joseph Louis, who was born in Paris on 16 March 1884, and who went on to own a café in Vevey, Switzerland. Pierre Rossier died in Paris some time between 1883 and 1898.

== Legacy ==
Examples of Rossier's views of Switzerland are held in several institutions and private collections in that country. Rossier took the first commercial photographs of China and Japan, and they are now quite rare. He complained at times of the adverse effects of the climate on his photographic chemicals and some of his negatives may have been damaged en route to London from Asia. Though his surviving images are scarce, his importance to the early history of photography in Asia is great. Before his arrival in Japan in 1859, Japanese students of photography had struggled to produce satisfactory images, but Rossier's experience, instruction, and contacts with suppliers of photographic materials were extremely helpful in the development of an autonomous photographic tradition in Japan.
