= Joseph Warren Zambra =

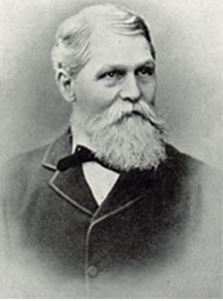
- Born: 1822; Saffron Walden, Essex
- Died: 23 December 1897 (aged 74–75); Hampstead
- Burial place: Highgate Cemetery
- Occupations: Optician, Photographer and scientific instrument maker
- Known for: Negretti and Zambra

Joseph Warren Zambra (1822-1897) was an Anglo-Italian photographer and maker of scientific instruments who with Henry Negretti (1818–1879) founded the firm Negretti and Zambra.

== Personal life ==
Zambra was born in 1822 in Saffron Walden, Essex, to Joseph Caesar (Cesare) and Phyllis Zambra. His father was a barometer maker and optician, born in Como, Italy. After an apprenticeship with his father, he travelled to London initially settling in the Anglo-Italian community around Leather Lane in Holborn.

On 9 February 184,7 he married Sarah Sophia Potts (1825-1867) and they had four children, Joseph Caesar (born 22 November 1847, died 24 September 1892), Marcus Warren (born 28 March 1849), Sarah Phillis (born 10 November 1850) and Julius James George (born in 1859). On 29 August 1867, his wife died instantly in tragic circumstances when she was thrown from a carriage at Arreton on the Isle of Wight. In 1869 Joseph remarried Sarah Tongue.

He died aged 75, on 23 December 1897 at his home, “Walden”, 80 Fitzjohns Avenue, Hampstead and is buried with his second wife Sarah (14 July 1823 – 15 December 1901) in Highgate Cemetery (west side). The grave has been listed Grade II both for its 'artistic interest as an imposing, architecturally treated monument with good-quality relief sculpture of archetypically mid-Victorian character' and its 'historic interest commemorating a pioneering C19 photographer and scientific instrument maker.'

== Career ==
Fellow craftsmen Henry Negretti and Joseph Zambra formed a partnership in 1850. The following year at they exhibited their meteorological instruments at the 1851 Great Exhibition at Hyde Park and were the only English instrument makers to receive a prize medal in their category. The partnership went on to patent several key improvements in the design of barometers and thermometers, producing models capable of functioning under extremes of pressure and movement. Their company Negretti and Zambra was subsequently appointed opticians and scientific instrument makers to Her Majesty Queen Victoria, Prince Albert, and King Edward VII, the Royal Observatory, the British Meteorological Society and the British Admiralty.

In its field, the firm became one of the biggest in London, with workshops in Hatton Garden and Cornhill and a retail outlet on Regent Street, as well as a specialist photographic equipment emporium at the Crystal Palace, which the partners had been commissioned to photograph when it was re-erected in Sydenham in 1853.

== Gallery ==
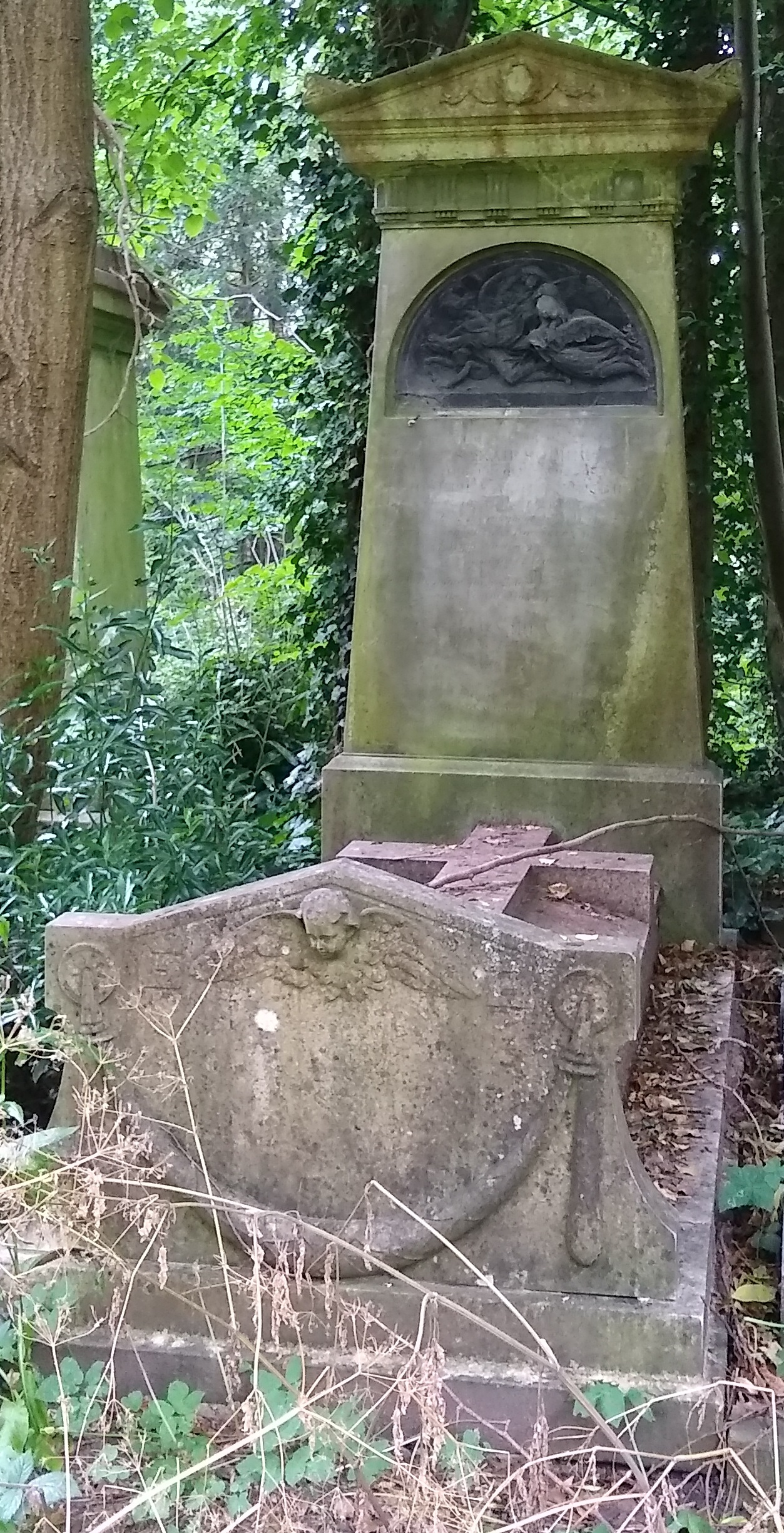
Family grave of Joseph Warren Zambra in Highgate Cemetery (west side)

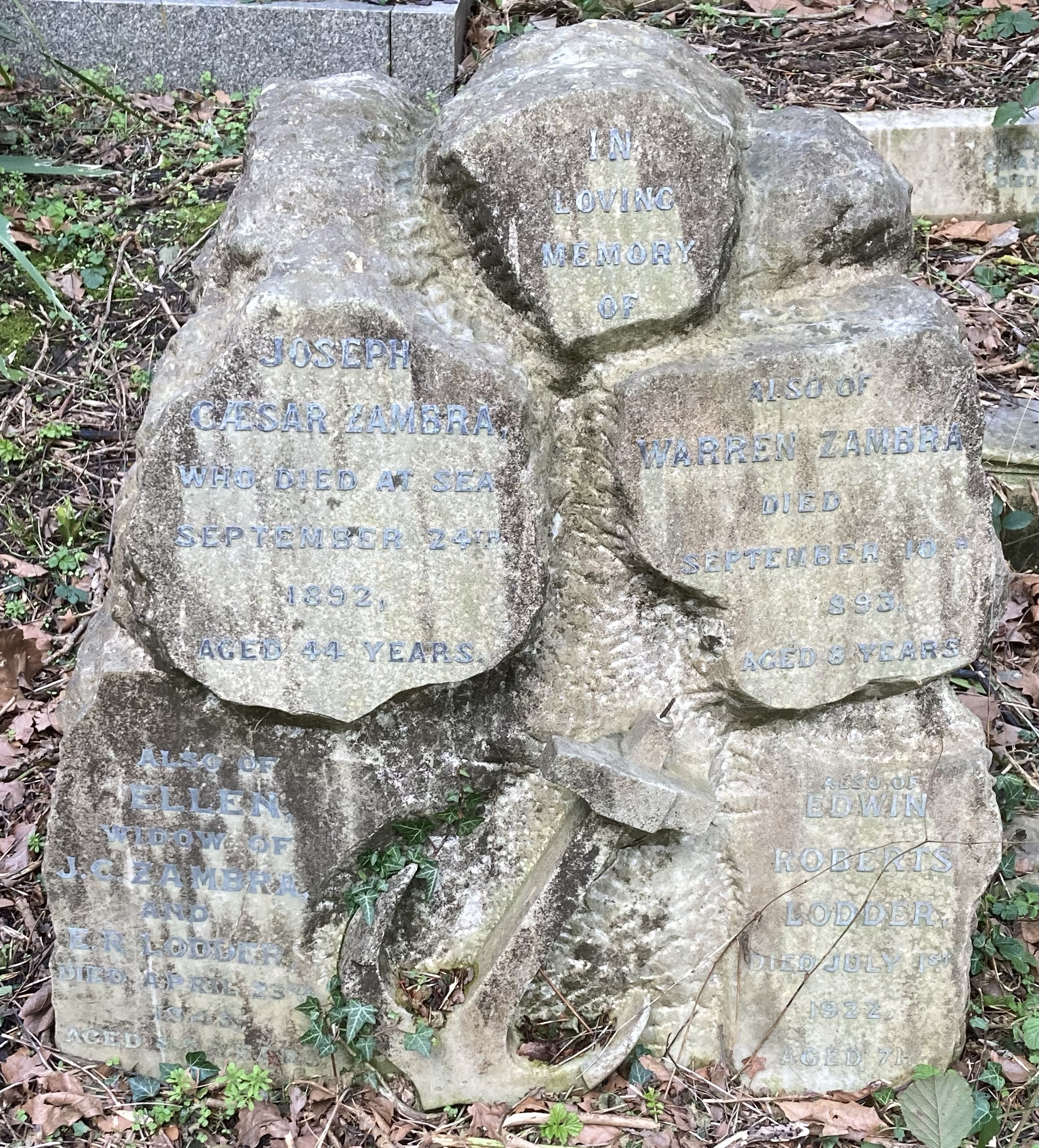
Family grave of Joseph Caesar Zambra in Highgate Cemetery (west side)

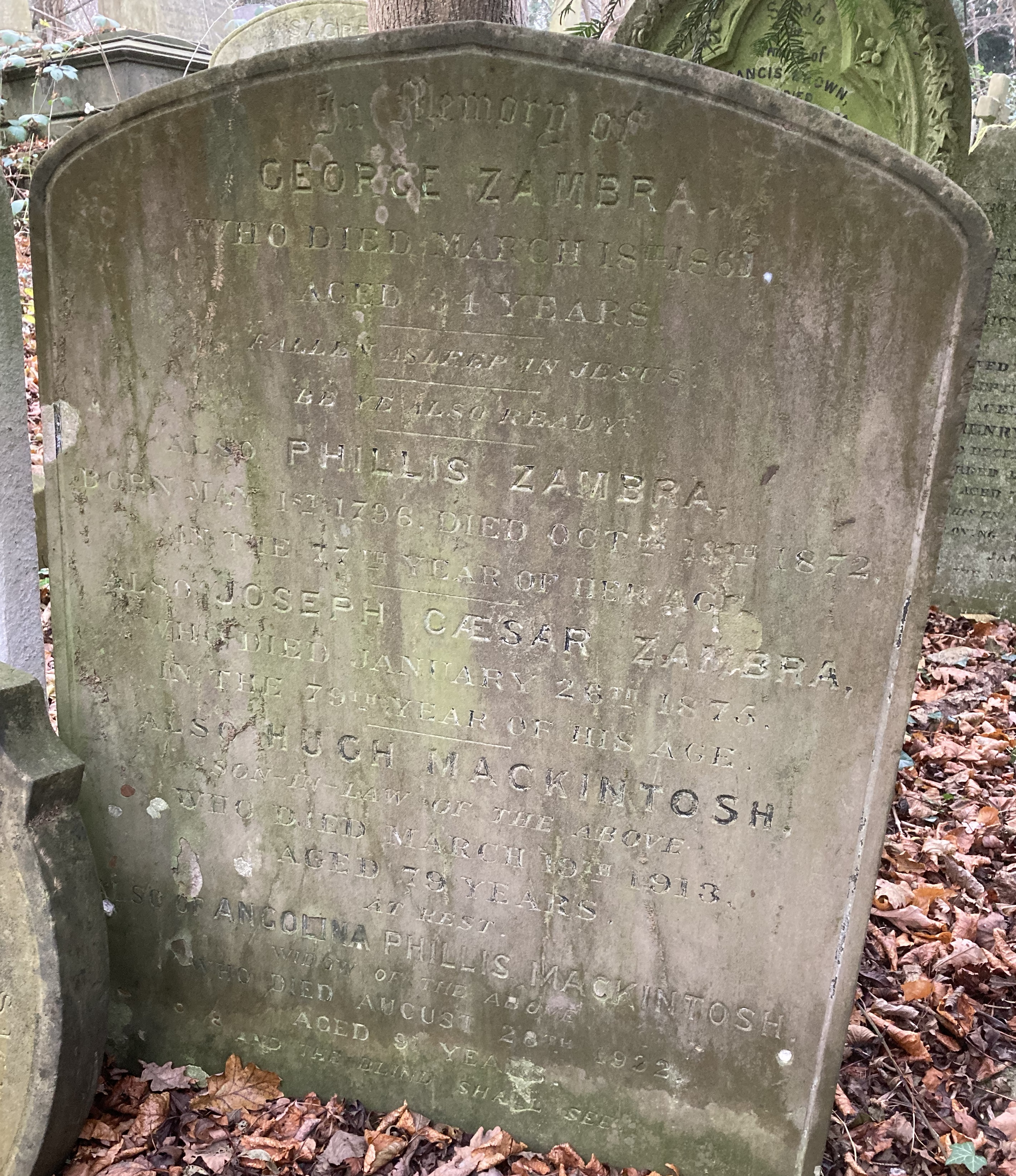
Grave of Joseph Warren Zambra's parents, Joseph Caesar and Phillis Zambra in Highgate Cemetery (west side)

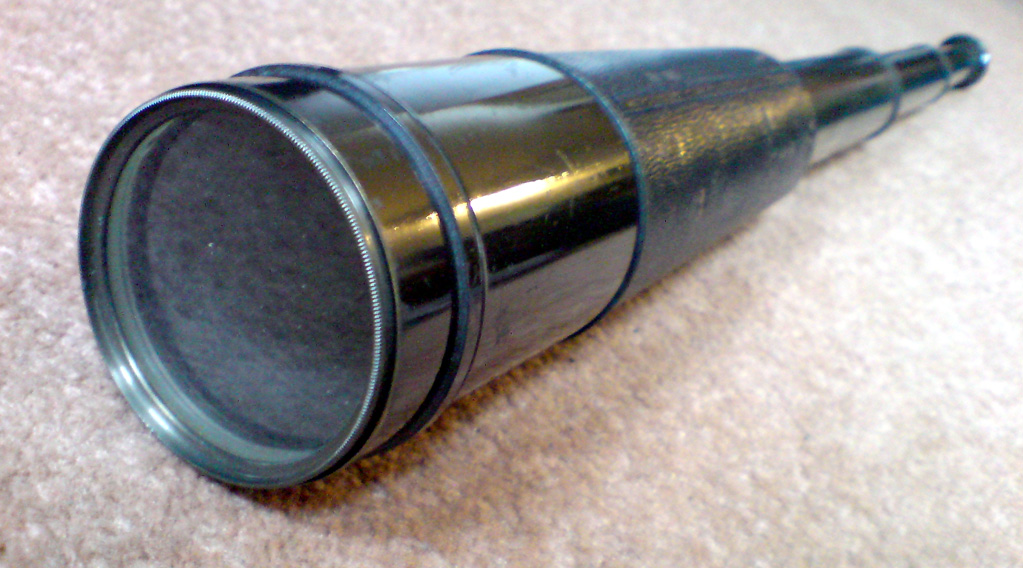
Negretti Zambra Telescope issued by the British military, date unknown

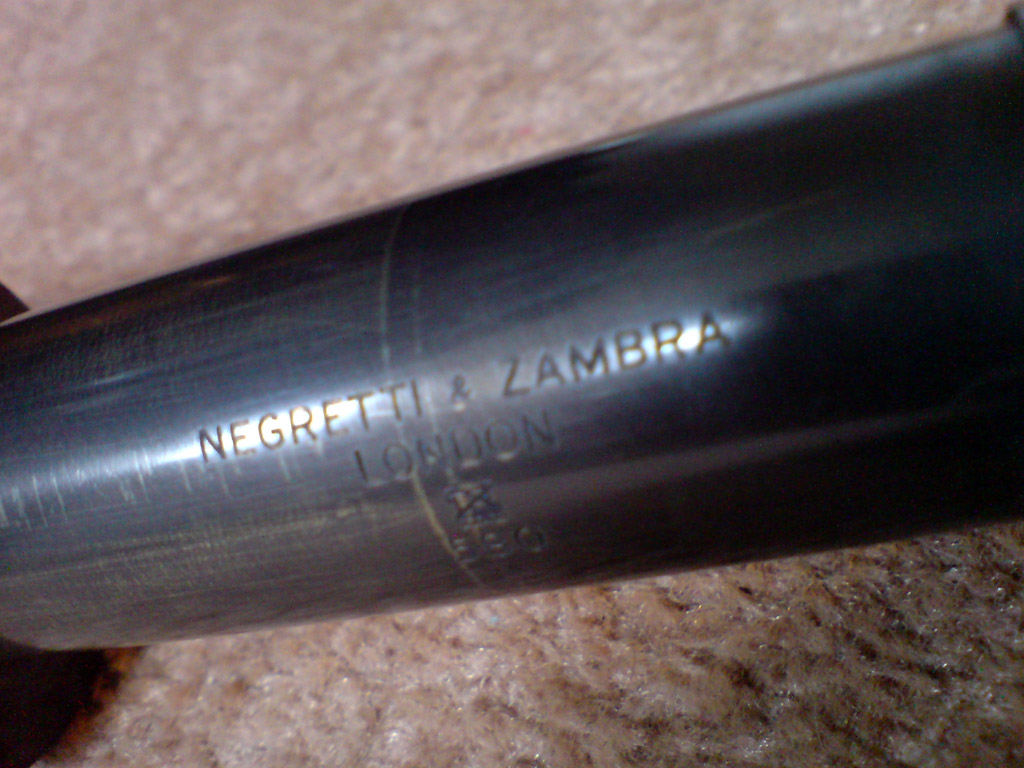
Detail from Negretti Zambra Telescope issued by the British military, date unknown
