= Tomishige Rihei =

Japanese photographer

- Born: May 19, 1837; Yanagawa Fukuoka Prefecture, Japan
- Died: February 7, 1922 (aged 84); Kumamoto Kumamoto Prefecture
- Occupation: Photographer
- Known for: Photographs of Kumamoto before and after the Satsuma Rebellion (1877)

Tomishige Rihei (富重 利平; May 19, 1837 – February 7, 1922) was an important 19th and early 20th century Japanese photographer. He was a pioneer of wet-plate photography in Japan and was noted for his excellent large-format, albumen landscapes. Tomishige is especially renowned in Kyūshū.

In 1854 Tomishige left his hometown of Yanagawa for Nagasaki, where he started his career as a merchant. When this career proved unsuccessful, in 1862 he became an apprentice to Kameya Tokujirō, an early local photographer. Later that same year, Kameya left Nagasaki to open a photographic studio in Kyoto, so Tomishige continued his photographic studies under Ueno Hikoma. The two developed a lifelong friendship. In 1866 Tomishige returned to Yanagawa, where he opened his own photographic studio, but the business was not a success, so in 1868-1869 he once again worked under Kameya as apprentice in Nagasaki.

In 1870 Tomishige decided to move to Tokyo, but he ended up in Kumamoto where he opened a studio; probably the first in the city. The local army garrison commissioned him to photograph Kumamoto Castle. The photographs from this commission became particularly significant since the castle was destroyed in the 1877 Satsuma Rebellion, and Tomishige's images are among the few showing the structure before its destruction. Tomishige's studio was destroyed on the same occasion, but rebuilt the following year. Remarkably, the studio continues to this day, operated by his descendants. To mark 130 years of its existence, in 1993 the studio collaborated in an exhibition at the Kumamoto Prefectural Museum of Art (Kumamoto Kenritsu Bijutsukan) and the accompanying catalogue, Tomishige shashinjo no 130-nen.

Tomishige was the most popular professional photographer in Kumamoto, and many soldiers and generals came to him to have their pictures taken. Viscount Tani Tateki and his staff of the army in the Satsuma Rebellion war were photographed soon after the war. Count Nogi Maresuke asked Tomishige to follow him photographing the after-effects of the rebellion, for three days, and Nogi paid for the photographs. He took photographs of the novelist Natsume Sōseki, Hannah Riddell (who first built Kumamoto's first leprosy hospital), Nogi Maresuke (one of the most famous generals in Japan), Prince Kitashirakawa Yoshihisa (who learned photography under Tomishige), Viscount Kawakami Sōroku, Kodama Gentarō and Lafcadio Hearn (a writer).

Tomishige sent photographs of Japan to various international contests including an international health exhibition held in Dresden, Germany in 1911; he used the name of his son in this case. It was shown in the Japanese Pavilion.

The Tomishige Photographic Studio is still active today and managed by his grand-grand son Rihei since 2010, the 4th director of the studio.

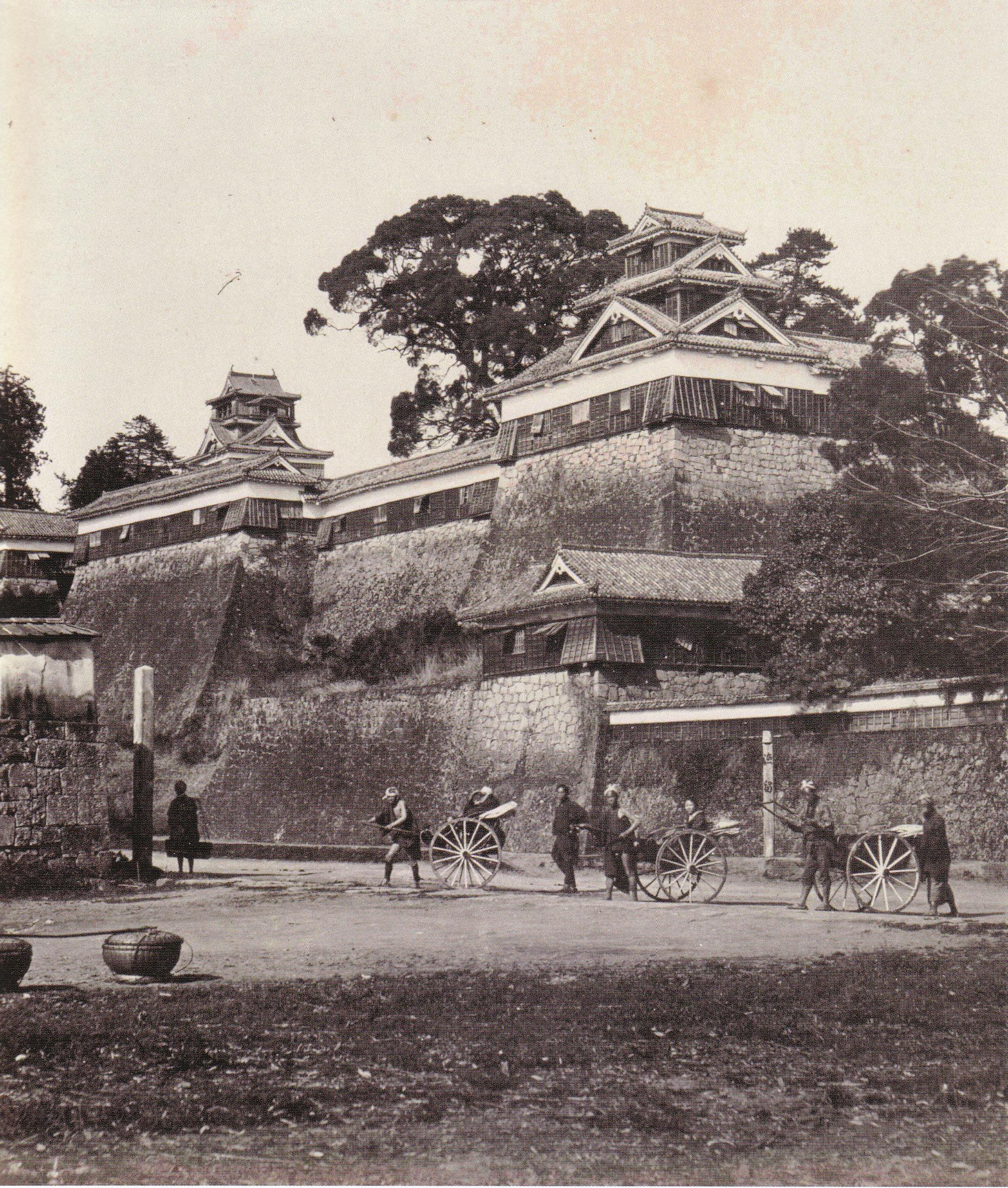
Kumamoto Castle taken by Tomishige Rihei in 1874, before destruction
