= Uchida Kuichi =

Japanese photographer (1844-1875)

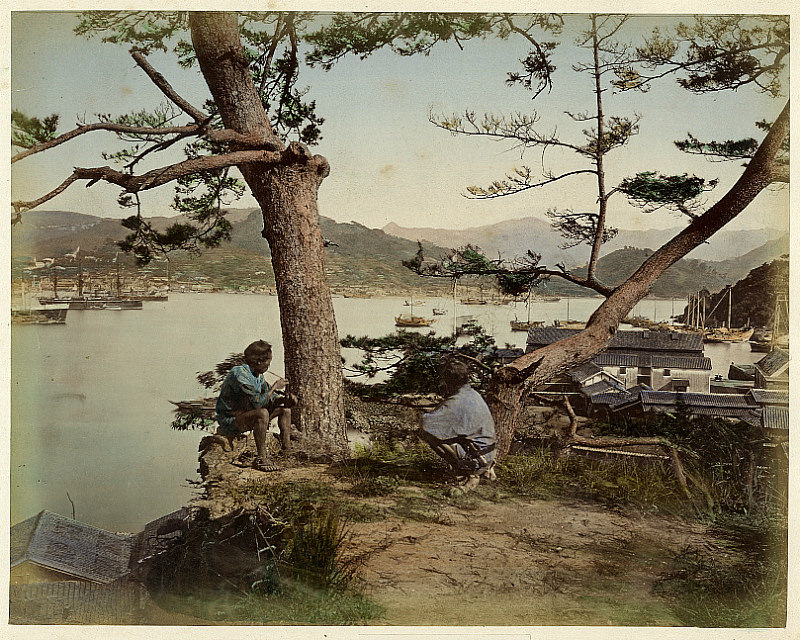
View of Nagasaki Japan, 1872

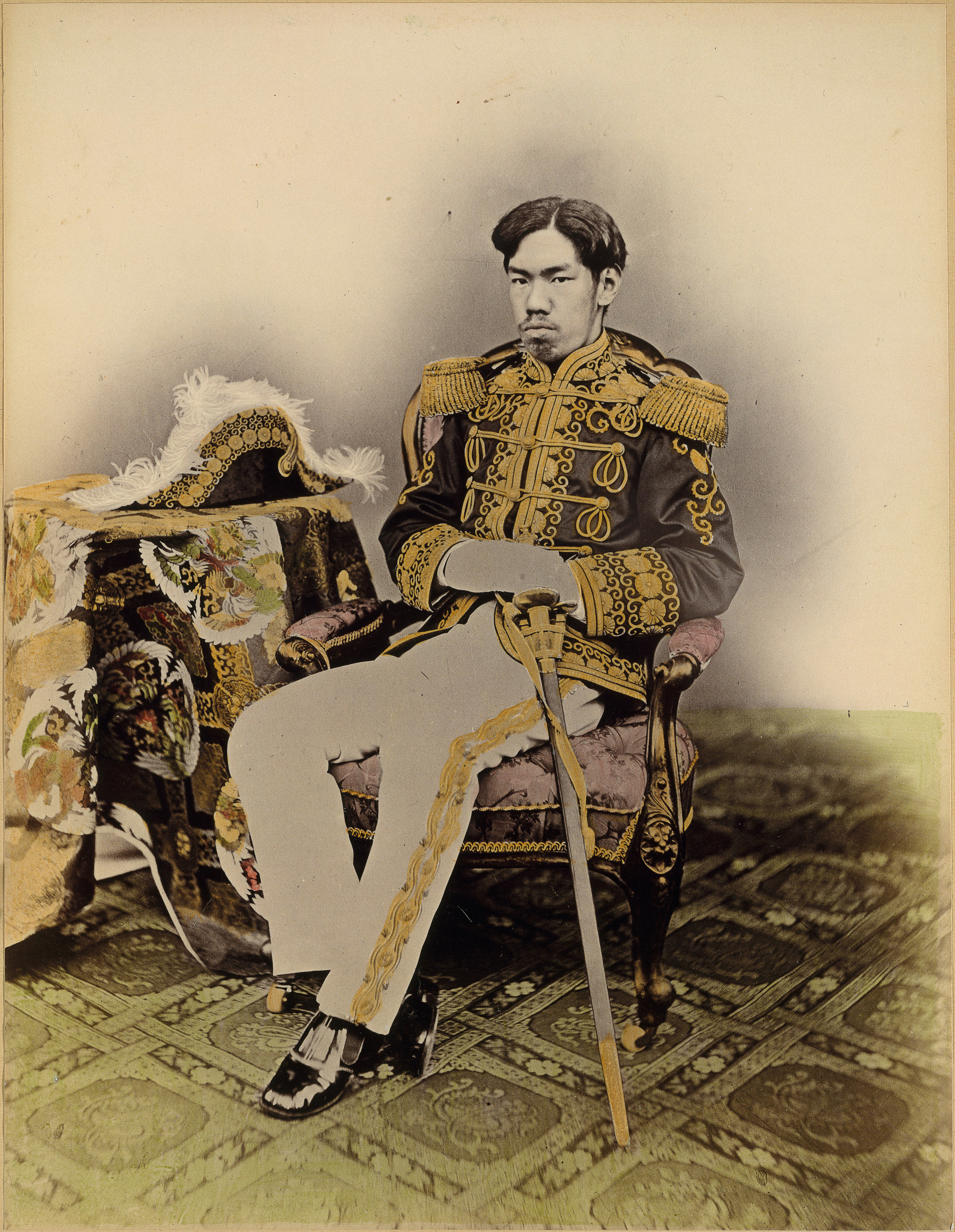
Portrait of the Emperor Meiji by Uchida, 1873. Albumen silver print

Uchida Kuichi (内田 九一; c. 1844 – February 17, 1875) was a pioneering Japanese photographer from Nagasaki. He was greatly respected as a portrait photographer and was the only photographer granted a sitting to photograph the Emperor Meiji.

Uchida was adopted at the age of 13, following his father's death, by the physician Matsumoto Jun (formerly Matsumoto Ryōjun) (1832–1907), who was at that time studying photography with J. L. C. Pompe van Meerdervoort (1829–1908).

Uchida studied photography under Ueno Hikoma in their native city of Nagasaki. When he was 16 years old, he purchased his first photographic equipment and by 1863, when he was 19, he was importing and selling photographic equipment. He opened his first photographic studio in 1865 with Morita Raizō in Osaka, the first studio in that city.

In 1866 Uchida moved his studio to Bashamichi in Yokohama, then in 1869 moved the studio again, this time to the district of Asakusa in Tokyo. He soon became known as the best portrait photographer in Tokyo.

Having achieved this reputation for excellence, Uchida Kuichi was the only photographer granted a sitting by the Emperor Meiji, who was considered a living deity and rarely seen in public. The portrait session took place in 1872 on a commission by the Imperial Household Ministry to photograph the Emperor and Empress Haruko in full court dress and everyday robes. In 1873, Uchida again photographed the Emperor, who this time wore military dress, and a photograph from this sitting became the official imperial portrait. Copies of the official portrait were distributed among foreign heads of state and Japanese regional governmental offices and schools, but their private sale was prohibited. Nevertheless, many copies of the photograph were made and circulated on the market. The emperor was not photographed again until 1888 or 1889.

In 1872 Uchida was commissioned to accompany the emperor on a tour through central Japan and Kyūshū, and to take photographs of the people and places during the journey. He was not permitted to photograph the emperor, however.

Uchida was very successful commercially and his life was even the subject of a kabuki play written and performed in 1870.

He died in 1875 of tuberculosis.

== Gallery ==
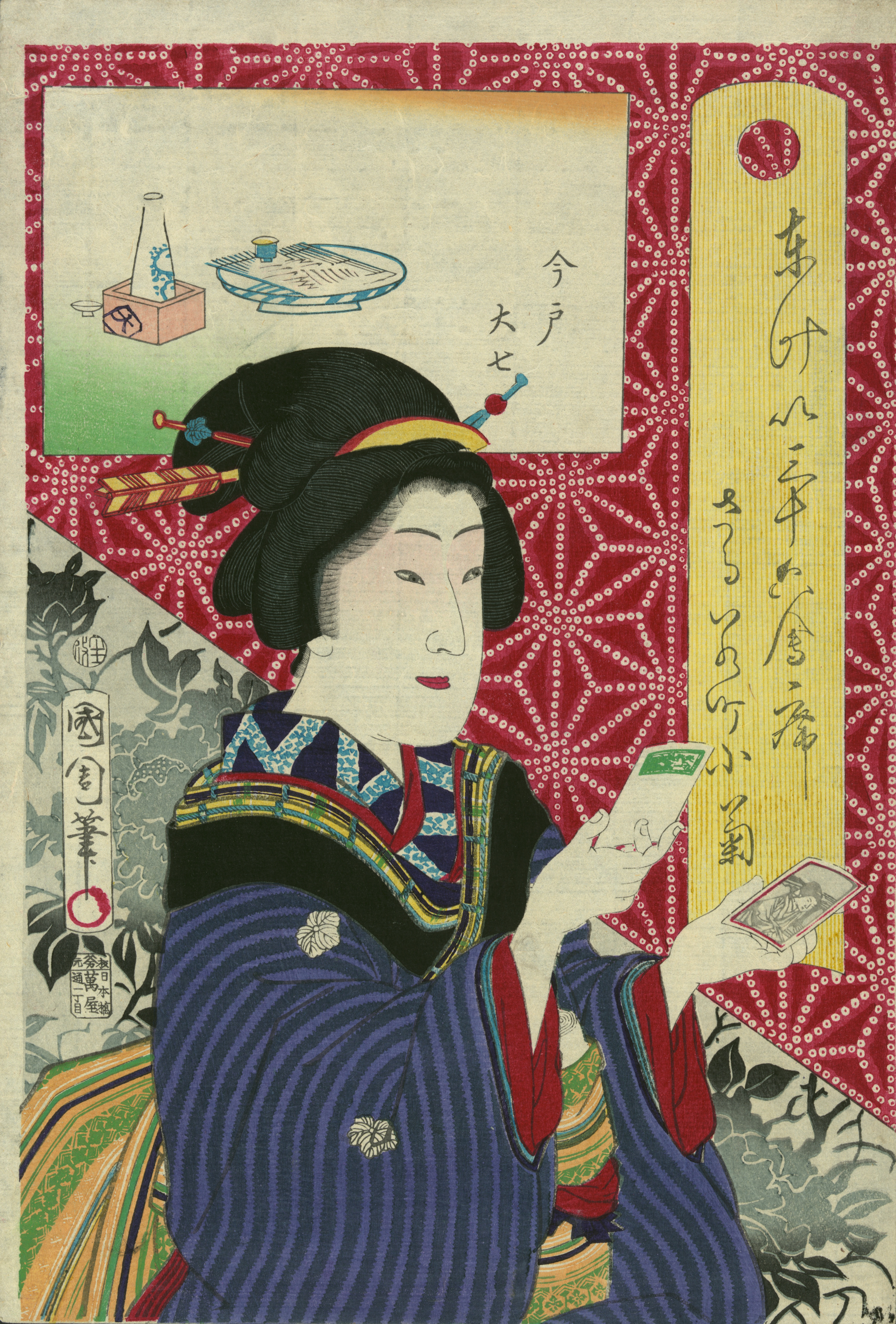
A contemporary ukiyo-e print depicts a beautiful woman looking at a carte de visite with Uchida's stamp.

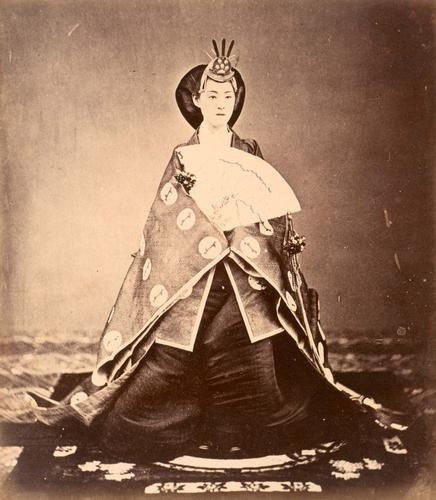
Portrait of Empress Consort Haruko (posthumously known as Empress Dowager Shōken, consort of Emperor Meiji). Albumen silver print by Uchida Kuichi, 1872.

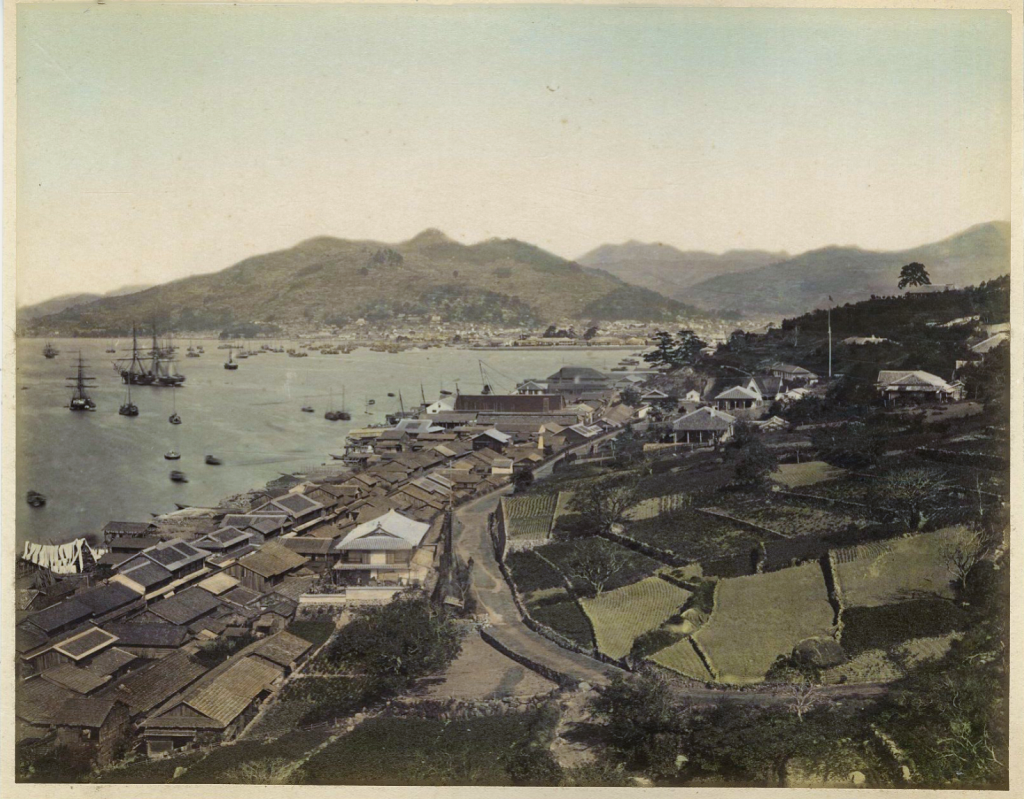
Nagasaki, pre-1874

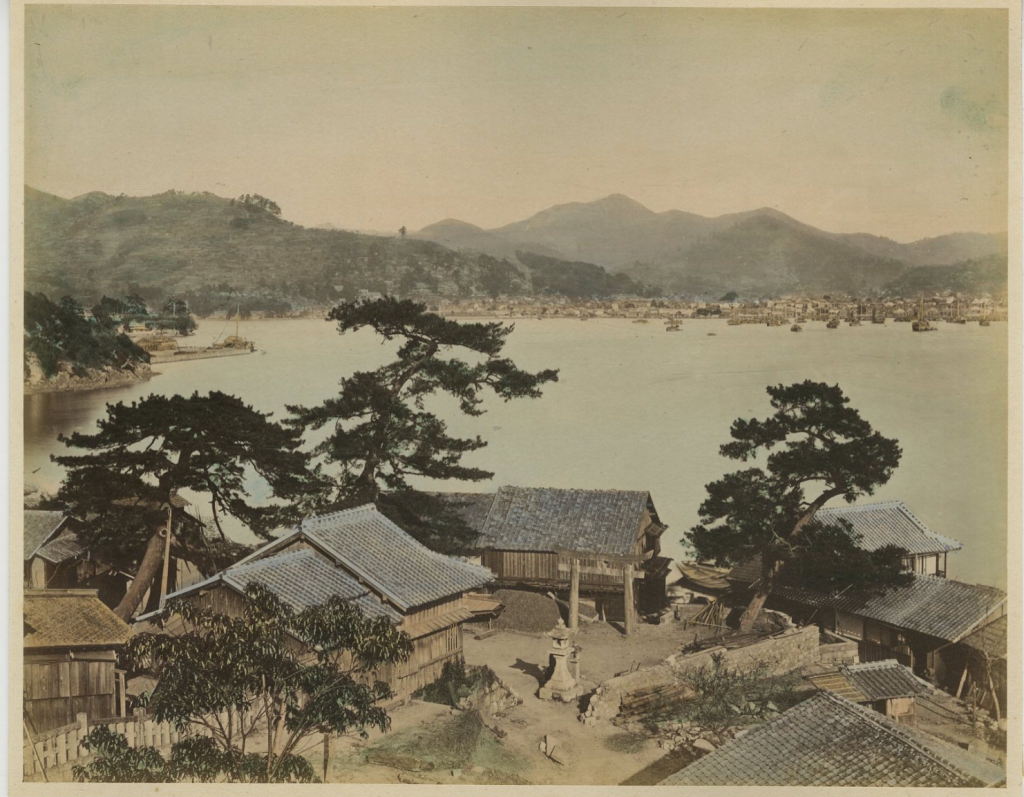
c. 1870s Nagasaki Ebisu Shrine

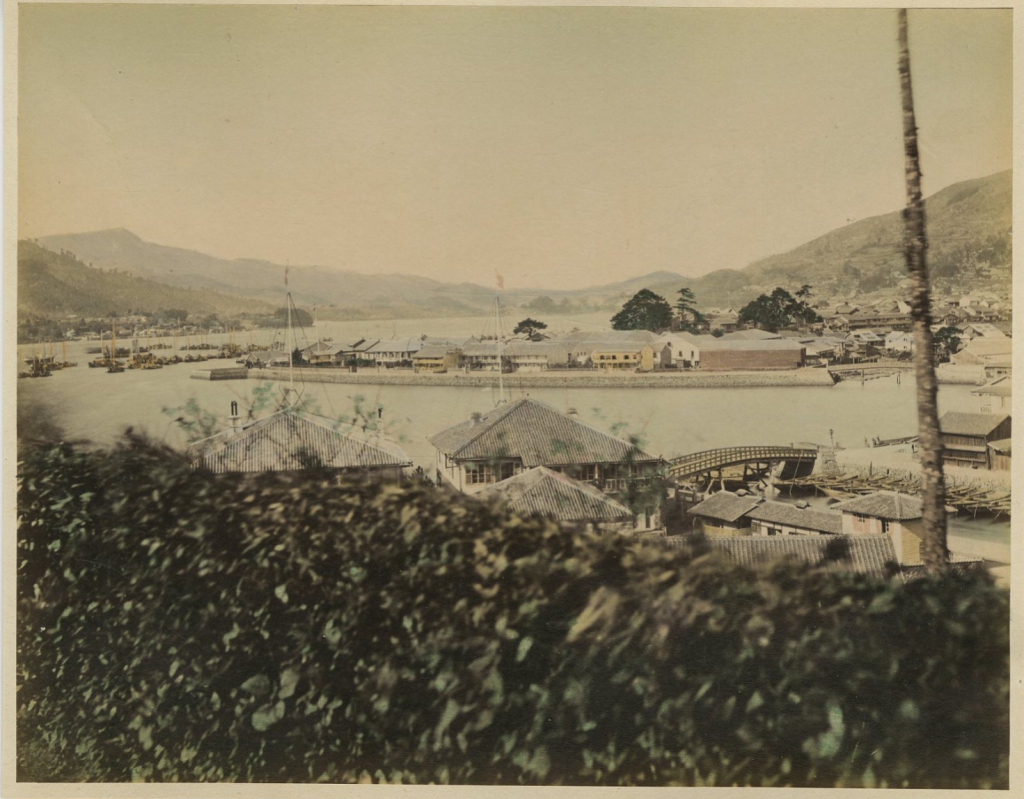
C1870s Nagasaki Dejima Island

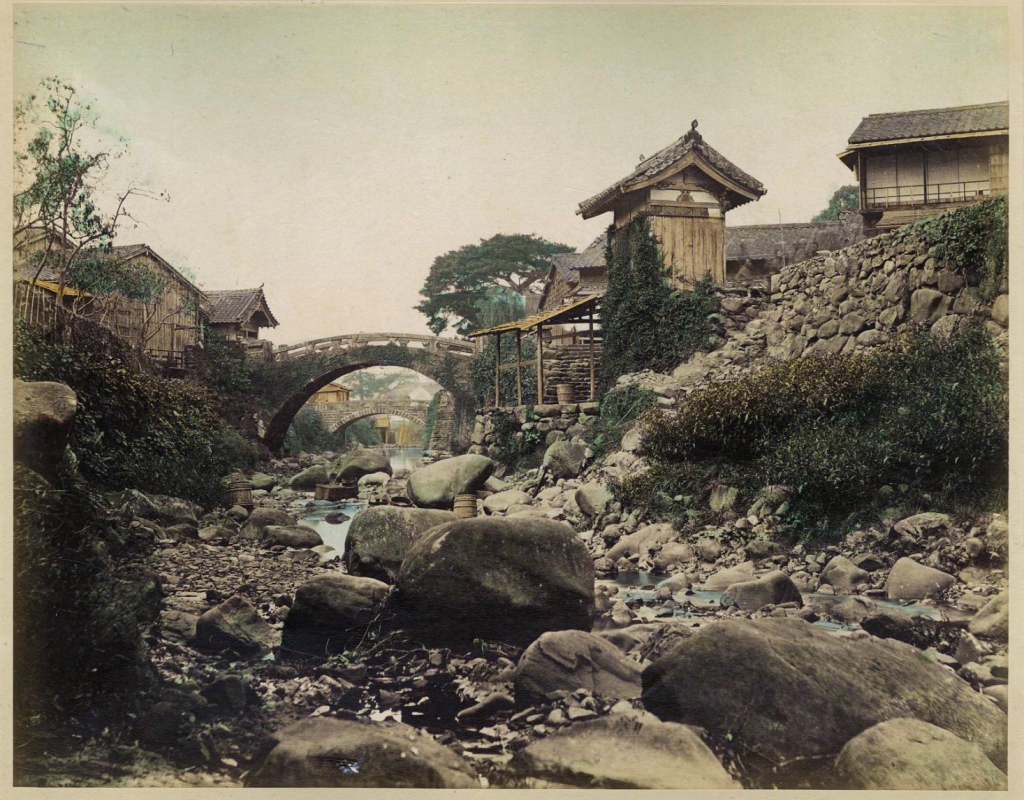
c. 1870s Nagasaki Nakashima River

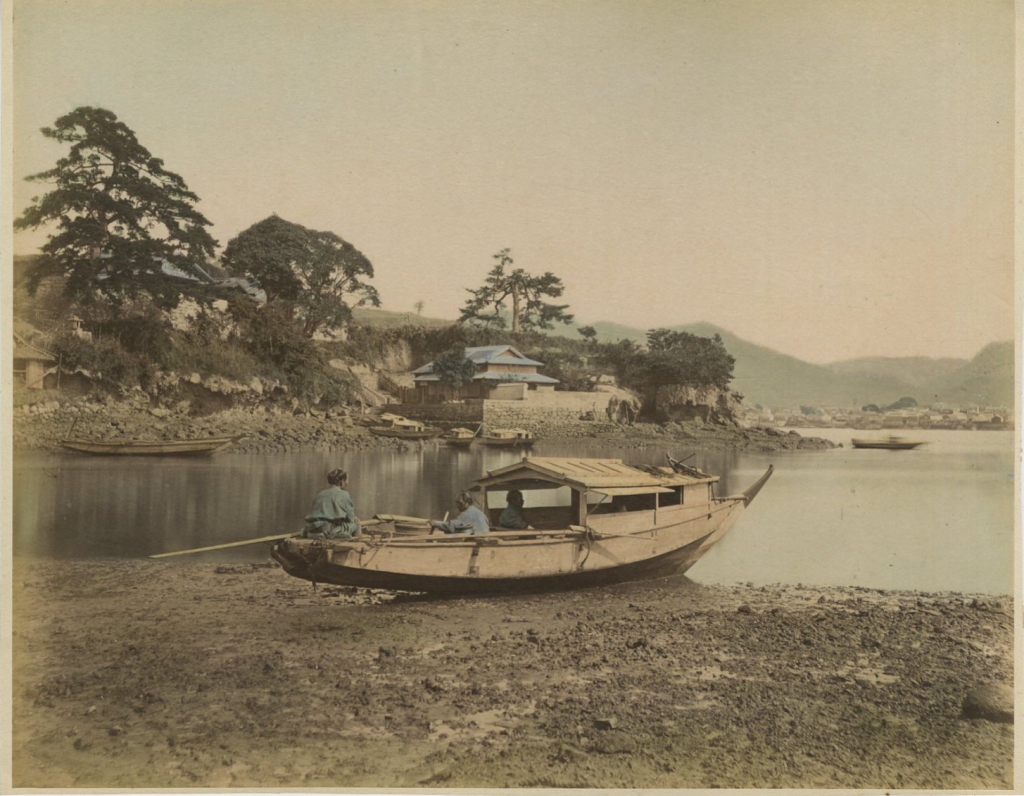
c. 1870s Nagasaki Inasa Coast
