= Zambretti Forecaster =

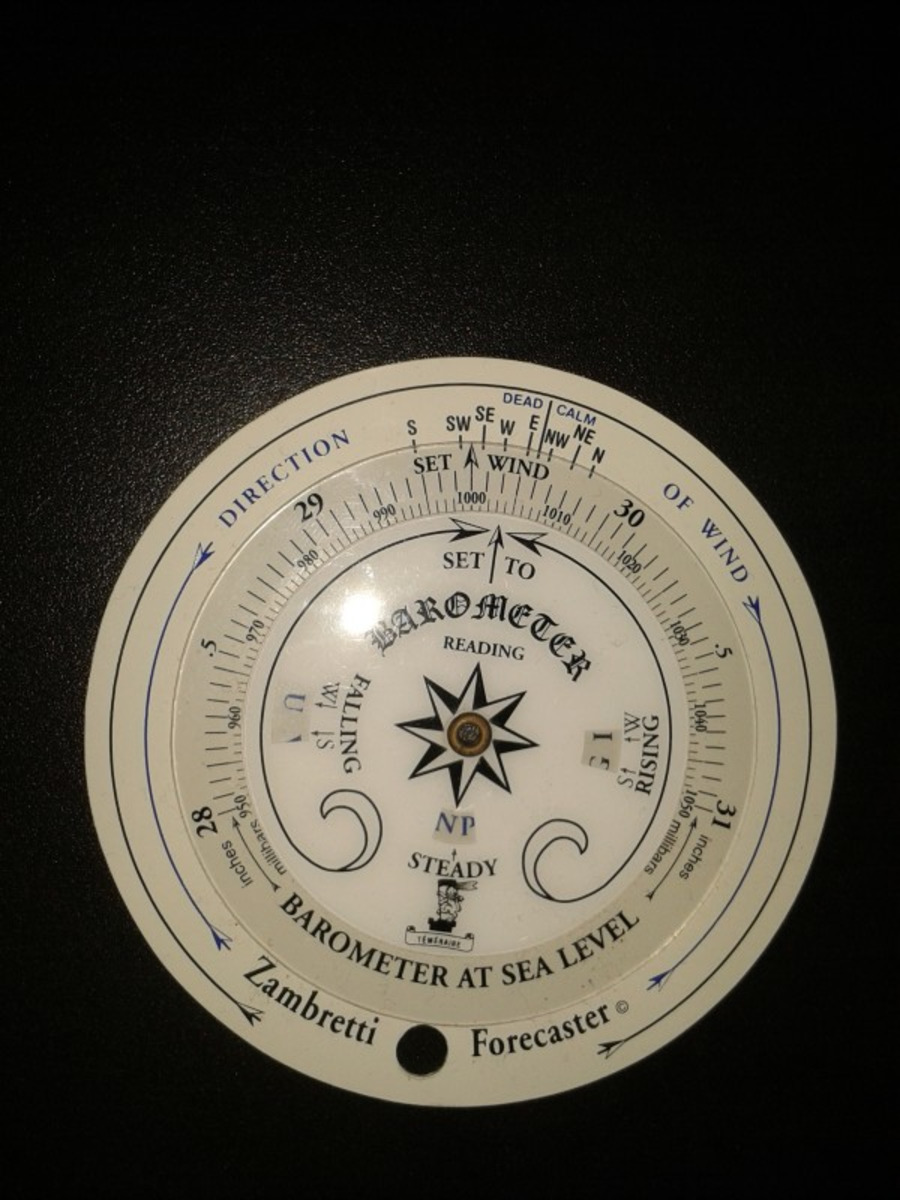
The Zambretti Forecaster

The Zambretti Forecaster is a weather forecasting instrument used in conjunction with a barometer. It interprets the reading of a barometer into one forecast from a large selection of permutations after making allowances for variable factors. These include wind direction, a rising, falling or steady barometer, and the season.

Negretti and Zambra were scientific instrument makers, noted for their barometers. The Forecaster was produced in 1915 as a portable forecaster which needed minimal instrumentation, a simple barometer and an observation of the wind direction, and was easy to calculate with. It was produced as a small disc calculator made of overlaid discs of ivorine, an early plastic. Despite its simplicity, it achieved 90% accuracy for 12 hour forecasts. The original Zambretti algorithm has since been implemented in a number of electronic forecasters.
