= HMS Sampson =

Six ships of the Royal Navy have borne the name HMS Sampson or HMS Samson, after the biblical hero Samson.

- HMS Sampson (1643) was a 20-gun ship captured in 1643 and exchanged for the 26-gun HMS President in 1646.
- HMS Sampson (1652) was a 32-gun ship captured in 1652 and lost in action in 1653.
- HMS Sampson (1652) was a 32-gun ship captured in 1652 and sold in 1658.
- HMS Samson (1678) was a 12-gun fireship purchased in 1678 and expended in 1689.
- HMS Sampson (1781) was a 64-gun third rate launched in 1781, hulked in 1802 and broken up in 1832.
- HMS Sampson (1844) was a wooden paddle frigate launched in 1844 and sold in 1864.
