= Morita Raizō =

Japanese photographer

Morita Raizō (守田 来蔵; 1830 – 1889) was a Japanese photographer.
