= J. L. C. Pompe van Meerdervoort =

Dutch physician based at Nagasaki

Johannes Lijdius Catharinus Pompe van Meerdervoort
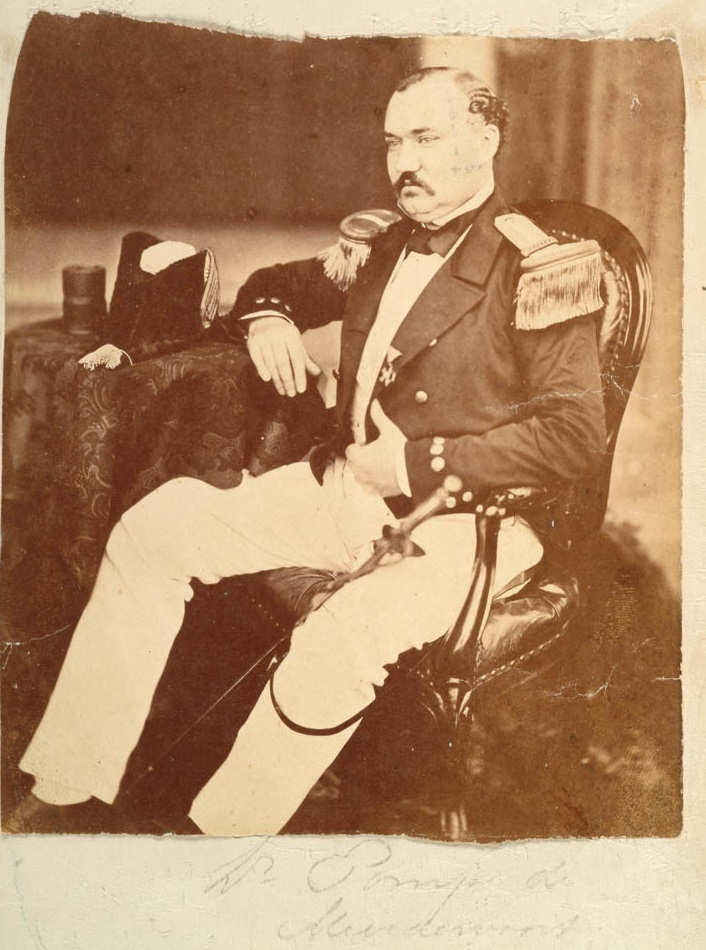
- Johannes L C Pompe van Meerdervoort
- Born: 5 May 1829; Bruges, United Kingdom of the Netherlands
- Died: 7 October 1908 (aged 79); Brussels, Belgium
- Occupations: Medical doctor, educator
- Spouse: Henriette Johanna Louise de Moulin (m. 1864)
- Parents: Johan Antoine Pompe van Meerdervoort (father); Johanna Wilhelmina Hendrika de Moulin (mother)

Johannes Lijdius Catharinus Pompe van Meerdervoort (5 May 1829 in Bruges – 7 October 1908 in Brussels) was a Dutch physician based at Nagasaki, in Bakumatsu period Japan. While in Japan, he briefly taught medicine, chemistry and photography at the Nagasaki Naval Training Center, and established a medical school and hospital. Some of his noted students included Nagayo Sensai and Matsumoto Jun.

== Biography ==
Pompe van Meerdervoort was born into an aristocratic family originally from Dordrecht, and was the son of an officer in the Royal Dutch Army, Johan Antoine Pompe van Meerdervoort of Leiden, and Johanna Wilhelmina Hendrika de Moulin of Kampen. Pompe studied medicine at the Imperial Academy for Military Medicine in Utrecht and became a naval surgeon in 1849.

Pompe van Meerdervoort traveled to Japan in 1857 with the second Dutch military mission led by Lieutenant Willem Huyssen van Kattendijke. Since the beginning of the seventeenth century, the ruling Tokugawa shogunate of Japan pursued a policy of isolating the country from outside influences. Foreign trade was maintained only with the Dutch and the Chinese and was conducted exclusively at Nagasaki. However, by the early nineteenth century, this policy of isolation was increasingly under challenge. Following the Perry Expedition and with the increased threat to Japanese sovereignty posed by the European powers and their Black ships, the Japanese government turned towards the Dutch for technical and military assistance. The Nagasaki Naval Training Center was opened in 1855 with Dutch military advisors to teach the Japanese about steam warship technology. On arrival, he found that his predecessor Jan Karel van den Broek had been devoting much of his energies into production of a Japanese-Dutch/Dutch-Japanese dictionary, and acting as technical advisor on a wide range of engineering and technical questions, rather than concentrating on medicine or medical education. However, this provided Pompe van Meerdervoort with a foundation on which he was able to establish a school of western medicine on 12 November 1857. Initially, he had only twelve students and used the residence of Takashima Shūhan to lecture on biology, chemistry, human anatomy, physiology, and pathology. He performed the first recorded human autopsy in Japan, and his student base quickly expanded to over 133 students, including Kusumoto Ine, the daughter of Philipp Franz von Siebold. The Nagasaki Naval Training Center was closed in 1860 and its Dutch staff withdrawn, with the exception of Pompe van Meerdervoort.

At the time, a widespread cholera outbreak was killing thousands in Japan, and at Pompe van Meerdervoort's suggestion the Tokugawa shogunate agreed to open Japan's first western-style hospital, the Nagasaki Yojosho, with 124 beds and a medical school in Nagasaki in 1861 This facility is now the medical school of Nagasaki University. People were surprised by his insistence on treating all patients equally without regard to their wealth or social standing.

Pompe van Meerdervoort returned to the Netherlands in 1862, accompanied by two of his students, who thus became the first Japanese to study western medicine abroad.

In 1867-1868 Pompe published a book titled Vijf jaren in Japan ("Five Years in Japan").

Among Pompe's photography students were Ueno Hikoma, one of the first professional Japanese photographers, and Uchida Kuichi, who was the first to photograph the Emperor Meiji and Empress Shōken.

In Voorburg, near The Hague, a Pompe van Meerdervoortstraat was named after him.
