= Jan Karel van den Broek =

Dutch physician based at Nagasaki

Jan Karel van den Broek (4 April 1814 in Herwijnen, Gelderland – 23 May 1865) was a Dutch medical doctor based at Nagasaki, in Bakumatsu period Japan. While in Japan, he briefly taught medicine, chemistry and photography.

== Early life ==
Jan Karel van den Broek was born in Herwijnen, the Netherlands. After completing his medical education in Rotterdam he started practising in Arnhem in 1837. There he became an active member of the Physical Society Tot nut en vergenoegen (“For benefit and pleasure”). He gave numerous lectures and demonstrations for the members of the society and organised courses for the public. In 1852, he surprised his friends with his decision to leave for the Dutch East Indies. Before his departure he was given an honorary doctorate by the University of Groningen for his research on the human ear.

== Asia ==
In the Netherlands Indies he worked for a short term as physician at Cirebon, Java, after which he was appointed to Dejima, the Dutch trading post in Japan. He arrived there on 1 August 1853. Since the beginning of the seventeenth century, the ruling Tokugawa shogunate of Japan pursued a policy of isolating the country from outside influences. Foreign trade was maintained only with the Dutch and the Chinese and was conducted exclusively at Nagasaki. However, by the early nineteenth century, this policy of isolation was increasingly under challenge. Following the Perry Expedition and with the increased threat to Japanese sovereignty posed by the European powers and their Black ships, the Japanese government turned towards the Dutch for technical and military assistance. The Nagasaki Naval Training Center was opened in 1855 with Dutch military advisors to teach the Japanese about steam warship technology. Soon Van den Broek found out that there was little demand for his medical aid but much more for his aid in a variety of other technological disciplines. He helped the Japanese in constructing iron foundries, reverbatory furnaces, shipbuilding, steam engines and their construction, the making of sulphuric acid and other chemicals, etc. In December 1854 he started work on a Japanese-Dutch/Dutch-Japanese dictionary which kept him occupied till the end of his life. In 1856, at the request of the Japanese authorities, he started lessons in photography to Japanese students, among whom were Furukawa Shumpei and Yoshio Keisai.

In 1857 he was sent back to Batavia by the Dutch Commissioner for Japan, Janus Henricus Donker Curtius, who had developed a strong dislike for the doctor. Van den Broek returned to the Netherlands in 1859 and tried to clear his name from accusations made by Donker Curtius, in which he finally succeeded in 1859. Dr. Van den Broek died at Apeldoorn on 23 May 1865.

== Legacy ==
His papers, and the draft of his dictionary, are kept by the Municipal Library of Arnhem. His official correspondence is in the Netherlands National Archives at The Hague.
