= Negretti and Zambra =

British scientific and optical instrument manufacturer

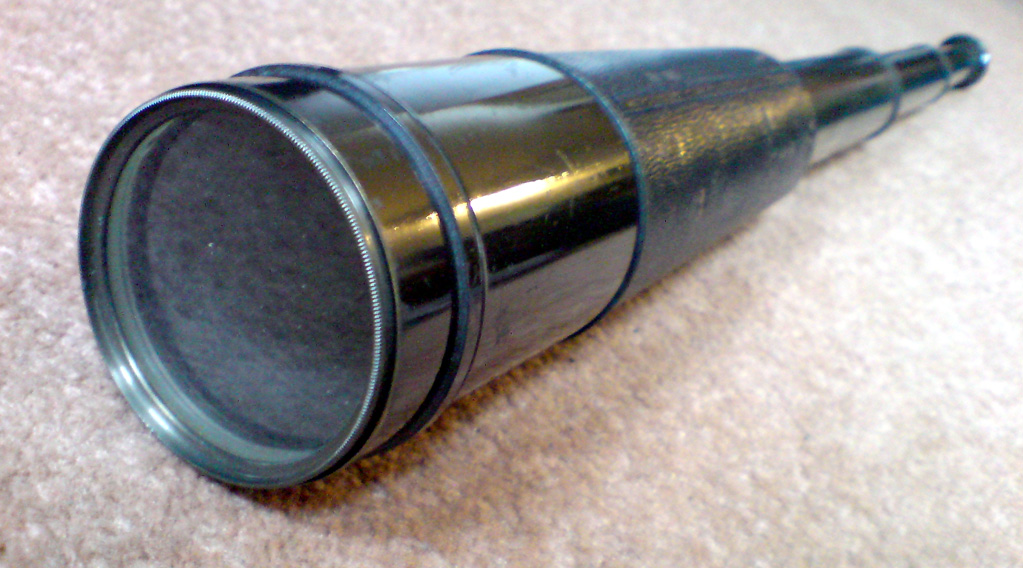
Negretti Zambra Telescope issued by the British military, date unknown

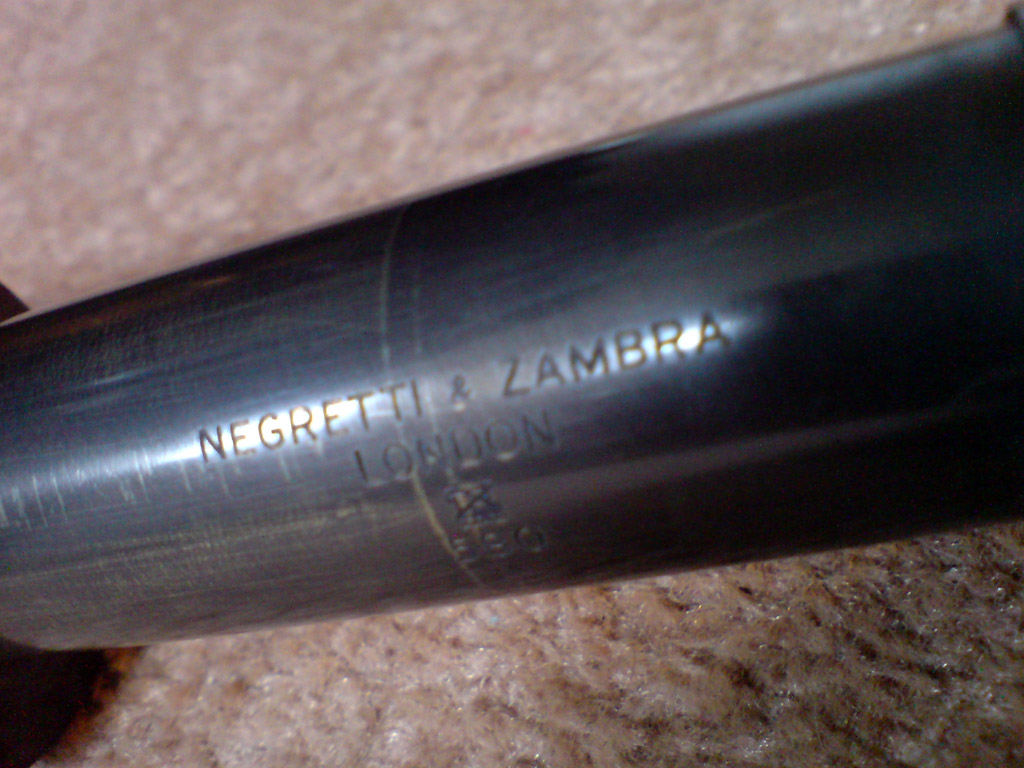
Detail from Negretti Zambra Telescope issued by the British military, date unknown

Negretti and Zambra (active 1850 – c. 1985) was a company that produced scientific and optical instruments and also operated a photographic studio based in London.

== History ==
Henry Negretti (1818–1879) and Joseph Zambra (1822–1897) formed a partnership in 1850, thereby founding the firm which would eventually be appointed opticians and scientific instrument makers to Her Majesty Queen Victoria, Prince Albert and King Edward VII, the Royal Observatory and the British Admiralty. Henry (Enrico Angelo Lodovico) Negretti was born in Como, Italy. Joseph Warren Zambra was born in Saffron Walden, Essex the son of Joseph Cezare Zambra and Phyllis Warren.

When the Crystal Palace was re-erected in Sydenham in 1854, Negretti and Zambra became the official photographers of the Crystal Palace Company, which allowed them to photograph the interior and grounds of the new building. The firm made use of this access to produce a number of stereographs. In 1856 Negretti and Zambra sponsored a photographic expedition to Egypt, Nubia and Ethiopia conducted by Francis Frith. More than 500 stereographs of Frith's voyage were produced by the firm between 1857 and 1860.

Negretti and Zambra personally photographed Shakespeare's House, Stratford-upon-Avon. A sepia photograph was then pasted onto card 4" × 2.5". This was then presented to visitors to the Crystal Palace to enable them to compare it with the model erected by Mr. E. T. Parris — better known for his monumental panoramic paintings — in the Centre Transept. The card is headed "Crystal Palace April 23rd 1864."

Between 1855 and 1857 Negretti and Zambra commissioned the photographer Pierre Rossier to travel to China to document the Second Opium War. Although Rossier subsequently was unable to accompany Anglo-French forces in that campaign, he nevertheless produced a number of stereographs and other photographs of China, Japan, the Philippines and Siam (now Thailand), which Negretti and Zambra published and that represented the first commercial photographs of those countries. In May 1863 Henry Negretti took the first aerial photographs of London from a balloon piloted by Henry Coxwell.

In 1865 they also published a book, titled A Treatise on Meteorological Instruments, which was reprinted in 1995. Francis Woodbury's stereoscopic slides on glass of Java were published in England by Negretti and Zambra.

== Takeover ==
In 1985 Negretti and Zambra was purchased by the avionics company Meggitt.

== Gallery ==
Additional photos of Negretti Zambra Military Telescope:

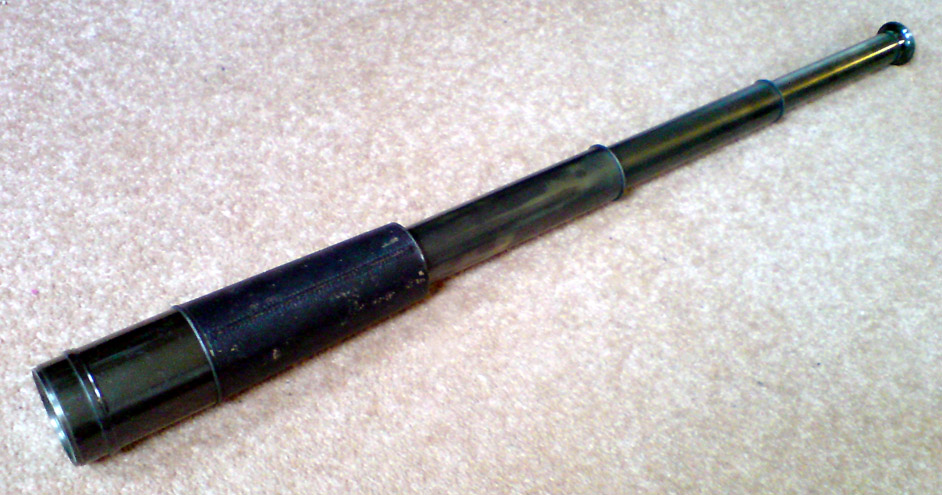
Negretti Zambra telescope

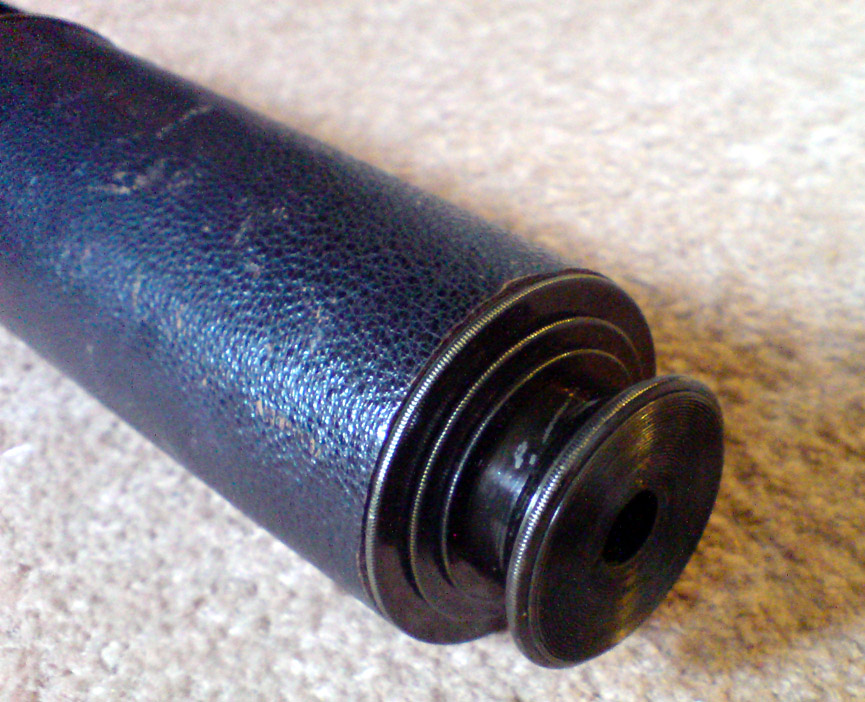
Negretti Zambra telescope. Detail showing eyepiece.

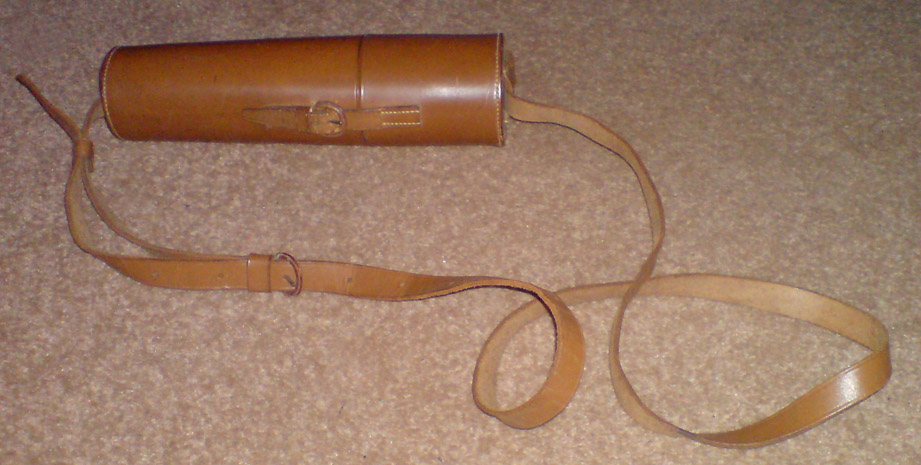
Leather case containing Negretti Zambra telescope

== See also ==
- Pierre Rossier, a photographer commissioned by Negretti and Zambra
- Aylesbury F.C., originally the works team of Negretti and Zambra
- Zambretti Forecaster, a weather-forecasting device
