= Typhoon Trami =

Pacific typhoon in 2018

Typhoon Trami (Paeng)
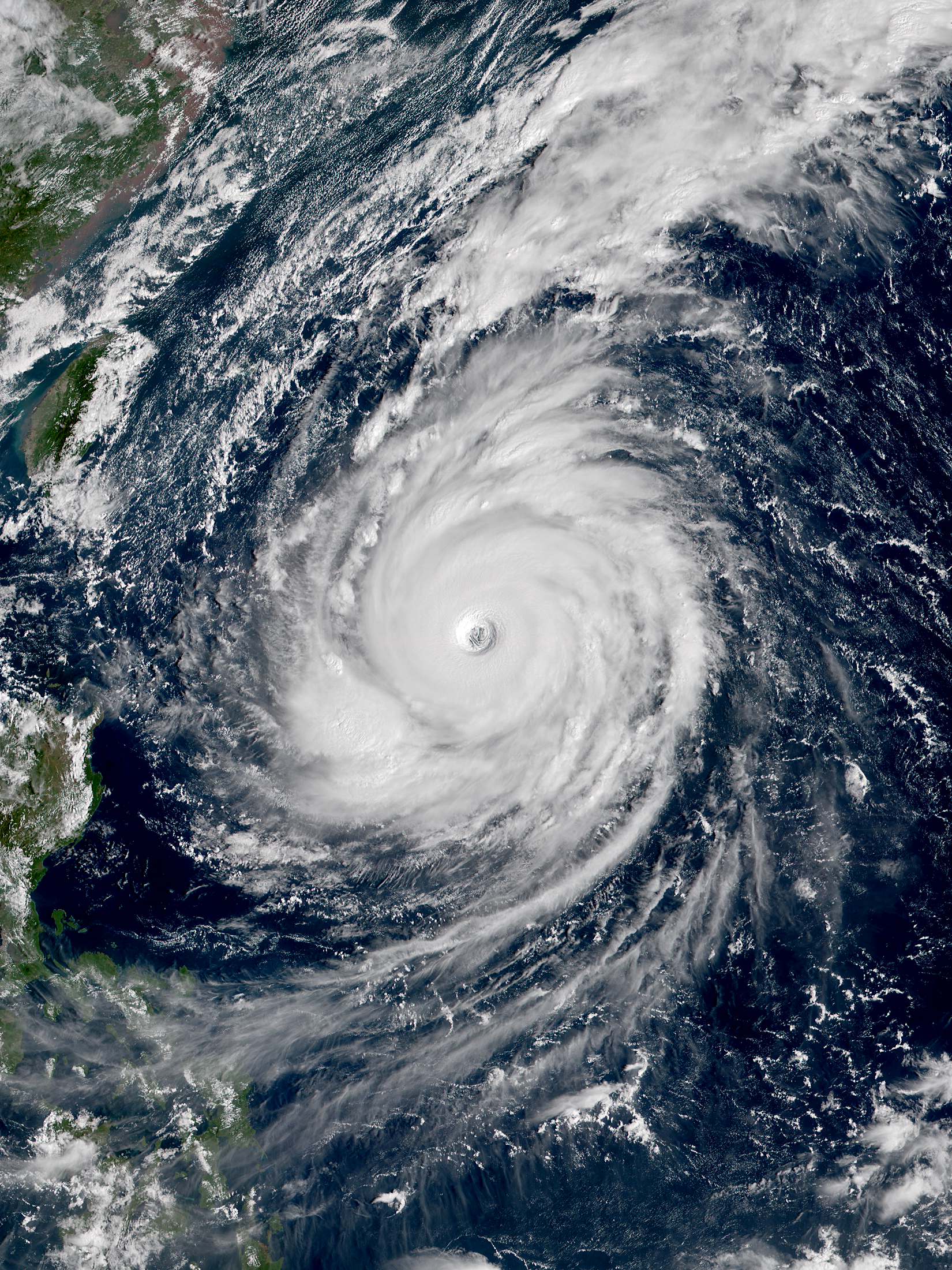
- Typhoon Trami at peak intensity south of Okinawa on September 25

Meteorological history
- Formed: September 20, 2018
- Post-tropical: October 1, 2018
- Dissipated: October 8, 2018

Violent typhoon
- 10-minute sustained (JMA)
- Highest winds: 195 km/h (120 mph)
- Lowest pressure: 915 hPa (mbar); 27.02 inHg

Category 5-equivalent super typhoon
- 1-minute sustained (SSHWS/JTWC)
- Highest winds: 260 km/h (160 mph)
- Lowest pressure: 914 hPa (mbar); 26.99 inHg

Overall effects
- Fatalities: 4 total
- Damage: $2.69 billion (2018 USD)
- Areas affected: Mariana Islands, Taiwan, Japan, Russian Far East, Alaska
- IBTrACS
- Part of the 2018 Pacific typhoon season

Typhoon Trami, (Note: The name Trami (Vietnamese: trà mi, [t͡ɕaː˨˩ mi˧˧]) was contributed by Vietnam and means camellia in Vietnamese.) known in the Philippines as Typhoon Paeng, was the second typhoon to affect Japan within a month. The twenty-fourth tropical storm and tenth typhoon of the annual typhoon season, Trami developed from a low-pressure area southeast of Guam on September 20, 2018. It intensified into a tropical storm on the next day and intensified into a typhoon on September 22. Trami steadily intensified and reached its peak intensity late on September 24. On the following day, Trami slowed and drifted northward. It began to weaken due to upwelling. Trami accelerated and turned northeastward on September 29, before it struck over Tanabe, Wakayama in Japan on the next day, and became extratropical on October 1. The extratropical remnants persisted for days until dissipated completely on October 8.

Trami caused additional damage to Japan, while it was still recovering from the impacts of Typhoon Jebi. Maximum gust from Trami were recorded at Hachioji, Tokyo, of 45.6 metres per second (164 km/h), which broke the record set in 2011. Trami also produced storm surge of 11.71 m (38.4 ft) at Cape Irōzaki. Transportation was disrupted with several domestic flights cancelled. Over 380,000 people were evacuated. In total, Trami killed 4 people and left hundreds injured. Insurance losses were estimated to be ¥306 billion (2018 JPY, $2.69 billion USD).

== Meteorological history ==
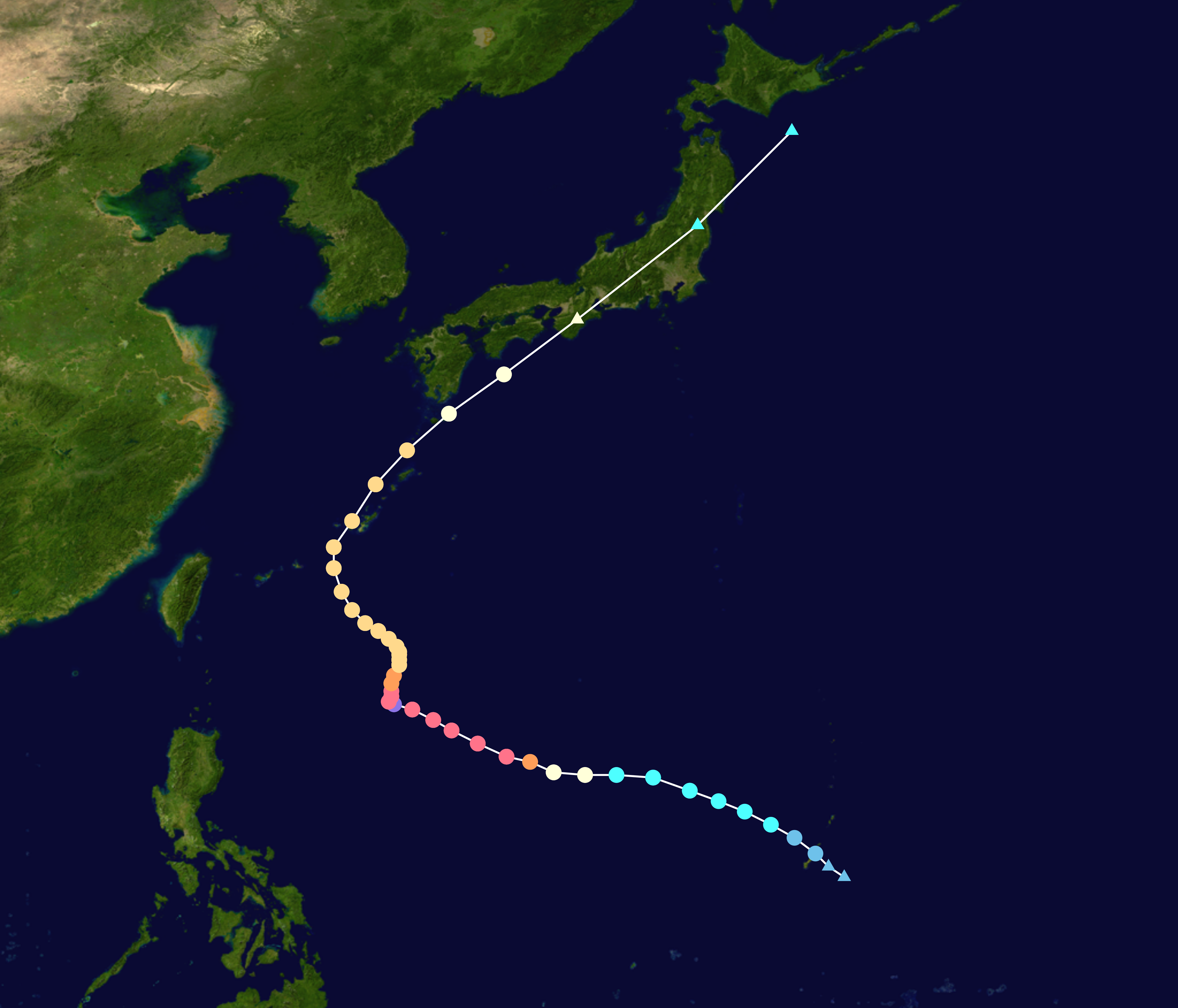
Map plotting the storm's track and intensity, according to the Saffir–Simpson scale Map key Saffir–Simpson scale Tropical depression (≤38 mph, ≤62 km/h) Tropical storm (39–73 mph, 63–118 km/h) Category 1 (74–95 mph, 119–153 km/h) Category 2 (96–110 mph, 154–177 km/h) Category 3 (111–129 mph, 178–208 km/h) Category 4 (130–156 mph, 209–251 km/h) Category 5 (≥157 mph, ≥252 km/h) Unknown Storm type Tropical cyclone Subtropical cyclone Extratropical cyclone, remnant low, tropical disturbance, or monsoon depression

On September 20, the Japan Meteorological Agency (JMA) began to track a tropical depression located to the southeast of Guam. Moving northwestward, the depression gained some organization, and the Joint Typhoon Warning Center (JTWC) issued a Tropical Cyclone Formation Alert (TCFA), and classified the system as a tropical depression later that day, giving the numeral designation 28W. The JMA started issuing advisories once the system attained winds of 55 km/h (30 mph). The JTWC upgraded 28W to a tropical storm on September 21, as it became better organized. The JMA followed suit later that day, assigning the international name Trami.

Satellite imagery of Typhoon Trami rapidly intensifying over the Philippine Sea on September 23

The system moved west-northwestward on September 22, under the influence of a subtropical ridge to its north. Benefited from the favourable condition such as high sea surface temperatures (SSTs) of 28 °C (82 °F) and low wind shear, Trami gradually intensified, attaining severe tropical storm on the morning, and became the tenth typhoon of the annual typhoon season later that day. The JTWC followed suit three hours later. Continued moving west-northwestward, Trami kept on intensifying thanks to favorable environmental condition. It developed a pinhole eye on that day and entered the Philippine Area of Responsibility, receiving the name "Paeng" from PAGASA.

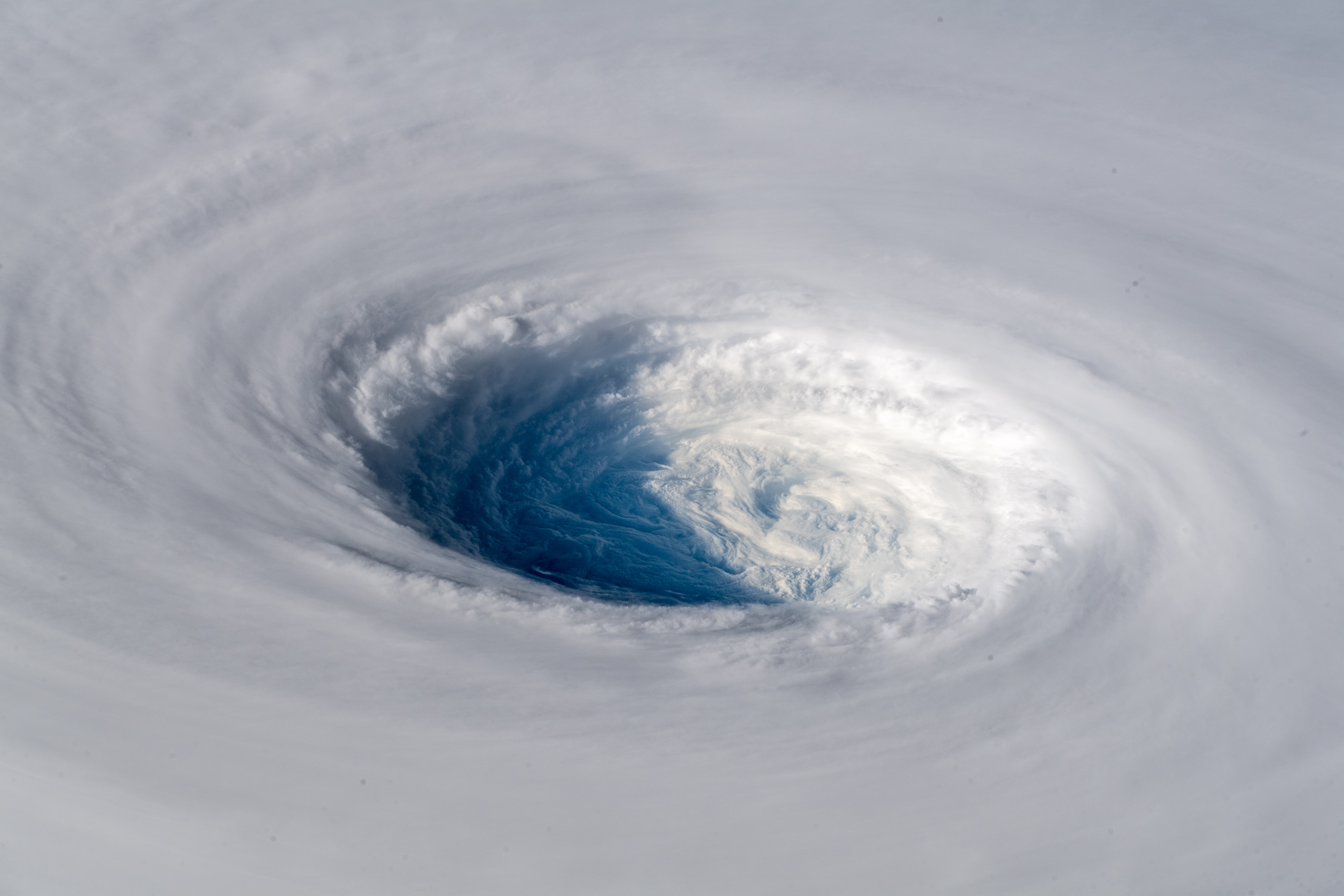
Trami showing a well-defined eye at the center of the storm as seen from the International Space Station

However, Trami soon entered a period of eyewall replacement cycle. Trami completed this cycle early on September 24 and resumed its intensification, with its eye became larger. According to JMA, the storm achieved its peak intensity at 18:00 UTC that day, with 10-minute maximum sustained winds of 195 km/h (120 mph), and a central pressure of 915 hPa (mbar; 27.02 inHg). The JTWC said that Trami has become a Category 5-equivalent super typhoon three hours later, with 1-minute sustained winds of 260 km/h (160 mph).

Soon afterwards, Trami lost its steering current and slowed as it is situated between two subtropical high pressure, an area called the pressure field of the saddle type. The typhoon's persistence over the same location for several days resulted in tremendous upwelling of cooler waters, with sea surface temperatures dropping from 28 to 21 °C (82 to 70 °F). The combined effect of cooler water and dry air resulted in significant weakening, and Trami dropping below super typhoon status late on September 25. However, the previously small eye of Trami expanded dramatically. On September 28, the subtropical ridge over the Pacific Ocean slightly intensified, and Trami accelerated to the northwest. Trami turned to the northeast along a westerlies on September 29, and passed just west of the Okinawa Island. The typhoon made landfall near Tanabe, Wakayama at 8:00 p.m. JST on September 30 (11:00 UTC), with winds of 150 km/h (90 mph). After Trami impacted Honshu, it completely transitioned into a hurricane-force extratropical cyclone and impacted the Kuril Islands, before weakening into a storm-force system. From October 3 to 8, Trami's remnants made a large counterclockwise loop over the Bering Sea, while gradually weakening, before moving back south of the Aleutian Islands. Trami's extratropical remnants were last tracked in the Bering Sea on October 8, near the Aleutian Islands.

== Impact ==
=== Taiwan ===
On September 28, the Central Weather Bureau (CWB) issued the heavy rain and extremely heavy rain alert to 7 cities and counties of Taiwan, warned that the rainfall in 24 hours will reach 200 mm (7.9 in) in those alerted area. The CWB also warned that the coastal and open areas may be affected by winds of Beaufort scale 9–11. Although Taiwan avoided a direct hit from Trami, large waves still affected the northern Taiwan. Wave heights at 4 m (13 ft) were recorded, and 4 people were injured by the large surf.

=== Japan ===
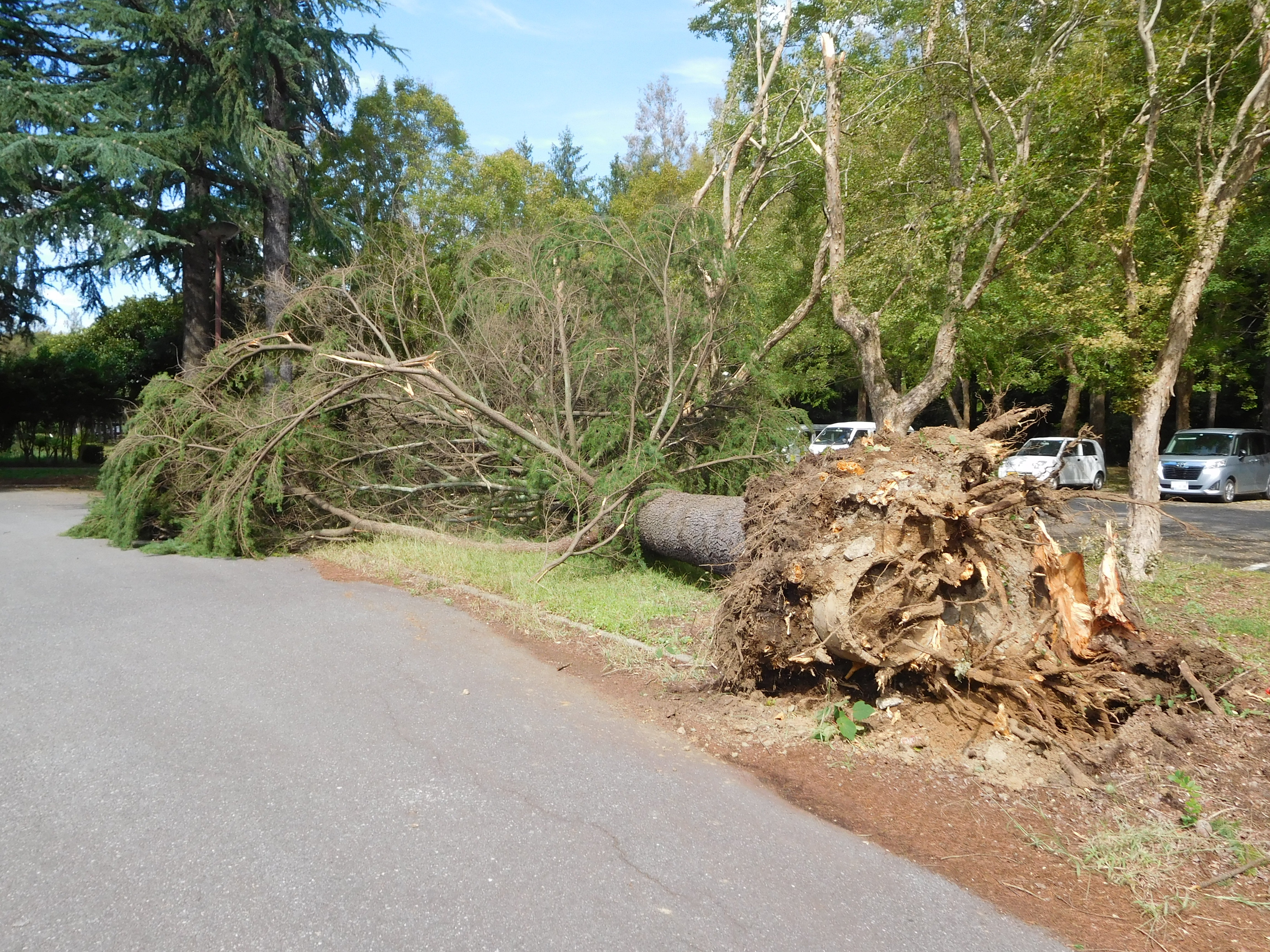
Downed trees in Tsukuba, Ibaraki after Trami

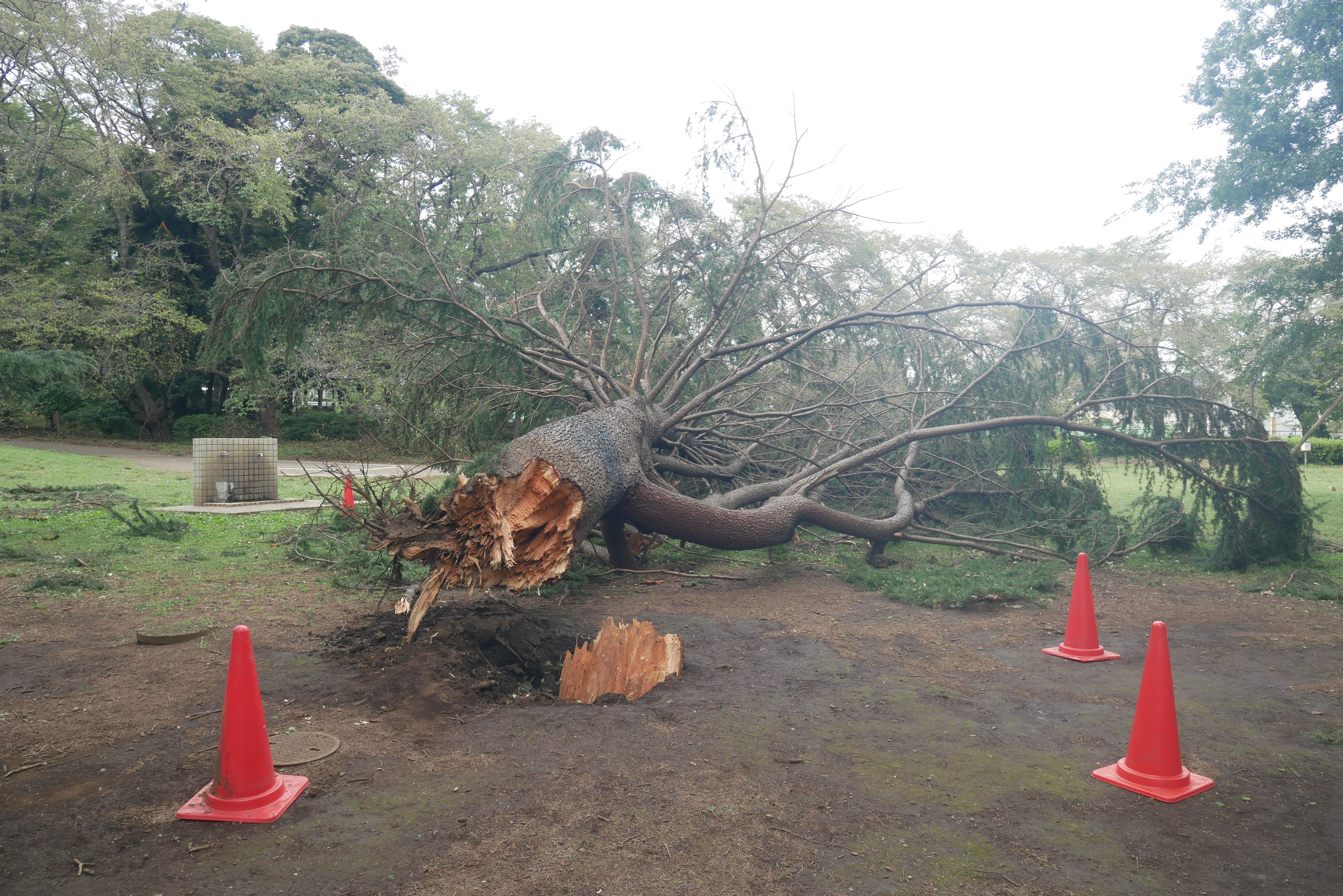
Damage in Tokyo

Trami made its closest approach to Okinawa Island in the afternoon of September 29, passing just 30 km (19 mi) west of the Naha Airport. Wind gusts reached 50.8 m/s (183 km/h) in Naha, Okinawa. 50 people were injured, and about 600 people were evacuated to the shelters. 30 cities and towns in Okinawa were suffering power outage. Almost 200 flights to the prefecture were cancelled. A guanyin statue in Ryukyu Golden Palace collapsed, estimated loss of about ¥100 million (US$880,000).

Trami brought strong winds and waves to Japan. The typhoon broke the historical records of 10-minute maximum sustained winds at 30 weather stations and the maximum gust at 55 weather stations in Japan, mostly on September 30. In mainland Japan, the maximum gust from Trami were recorded at Hachioji, Tokyo, of 45.6 metres per second (164 km/h), which broke the record set in 2011. Trami also produced storm surge of 11.71 m (38.4 ft) at Cape Irōzaki. More than 1,000 flights in Japan were cancelled, including 45 from Hong Kong. At least 4 deaths and more than 200 injuries were reported across the country. Insurance loss were estimated to be ¥306.1 billion (US$2.69 billion).

== See also ==
- Weather of 2018
- Tropical cyclones in 2018
- Typhoon Melor (2009)
- Typhoon Roke (2011)
- Typhoon Man-yi (2013)
- Typhoon Phanfone (2014)
- Typhoon Noru (2017)
- Typhoon Jebi (2018)
