= Irōzaki Lighthouse =

Irōzaki Lighthouse Irō Saki 石廊埼灯台
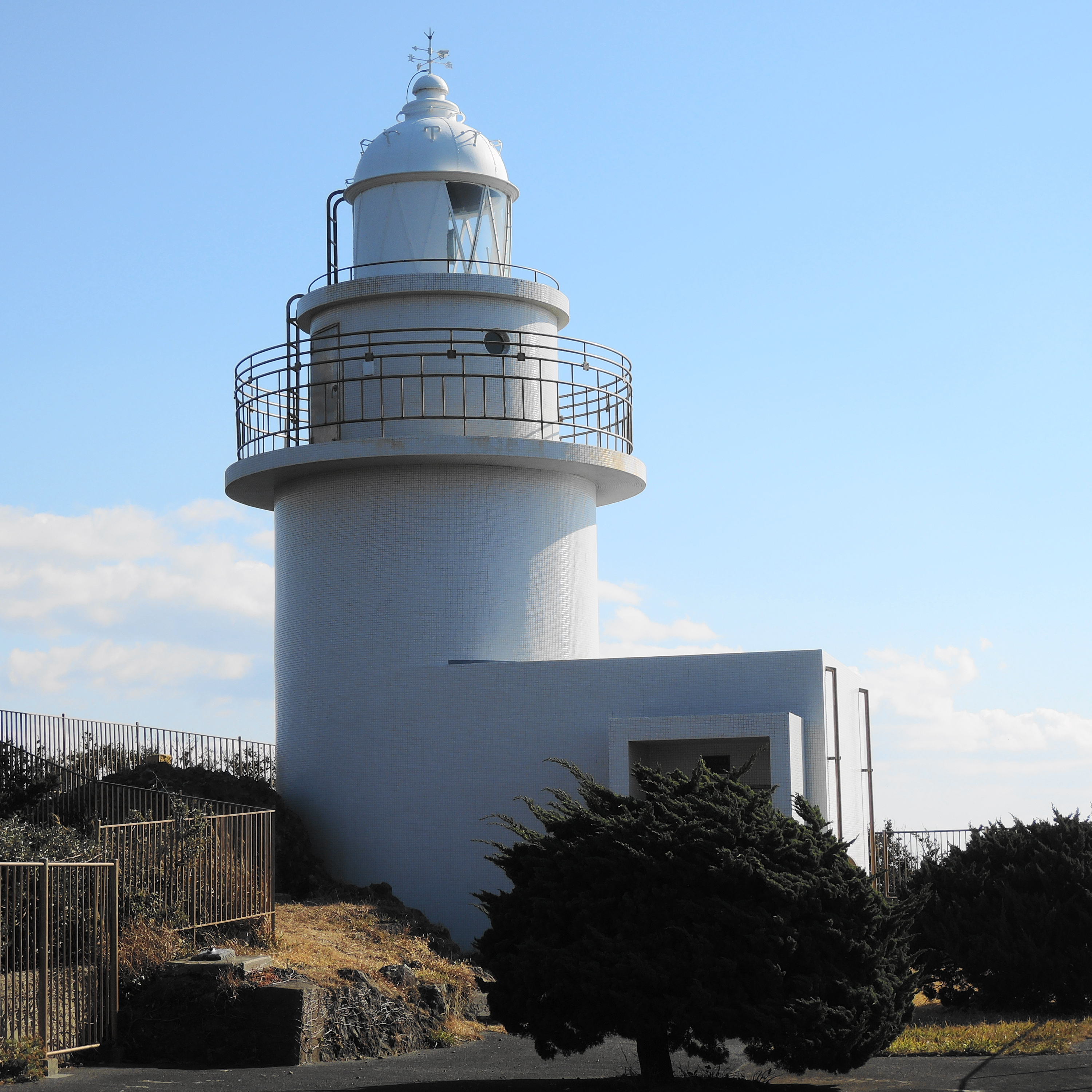
- Irōzaki Lighthouse
- Location: Minamiizu, Shizuoka Prefecture, Japan
- Coordinates: 34°36′10.1″N 138°50′42.2″E

Tower
- Constructed: 1871 (first)
- Foundation: concrete base
- Construction: concrete tower
- Height: 11.38 metres (37.3 ft)
- Shape: cylindrical tower with balcony and lantern
- Markings: white tower and lantern

Light
- First lit: 1933 (current)
- Focal height: 59.54 metres (195.3 ft)
- Lens: LB-H40
- Intensity: 60,000 candela (white); 67,000 candela (red)
- Range: 38 kilometers
- Characteristic: Al Fl W R 16s.
- Japan no.: JCG-2448

Irōzaki Light (石廊埼灯台, Irōzaki tōdai) is a lighthouse located on a hill at the outermost extremity of Cape Irōzaki south of the town of Minamiizu, Shizuoka Prefecture, Japan on the southernmost extremity of Izu Peninsula. It is located within the borders of the Fuji-Hakone-Izu National Park.

== History ==
Although not one of the eight lighthouses stipulated specifically by the provisions of the Anglo-Japanese Treaty of Amity and Commerce of 1858, the Irōzaki Lighthouse was one of the earliest of the 26 lighthouses to be built in Meiji period Japan by British engineer Richard Henry Brunton, and was the tenth western style lighthouse to be completed in Japan. Its construction was given priority by the Meiji government due to the frequency of marine accidents off the Izu Peninsula. The original structure as designed by Brunton was octagonal, and was constructed of wood.

Work began in July 1871. The Irōzaki lighthouse was completed on October 5, 1871. This structure was destroyed during a wind storm on November 14, 1932, and was replaced with the current reinforced concrete structure on March 31, 1933. Its lens was upgraded and structure repaired in 1993.

The Irōzaki Lighthouse is listed as one of the “50 Lighthouses of Japan” by the Japan Lighthouse Association. It is operated by the Japan Coast Guard.

== See also ==
- List of lighthouses in Japan
