= Iwachi, Shizuoka =

Area within town of Matsuzaki, Japan

Coordinates: 34.738°N 138.760°E

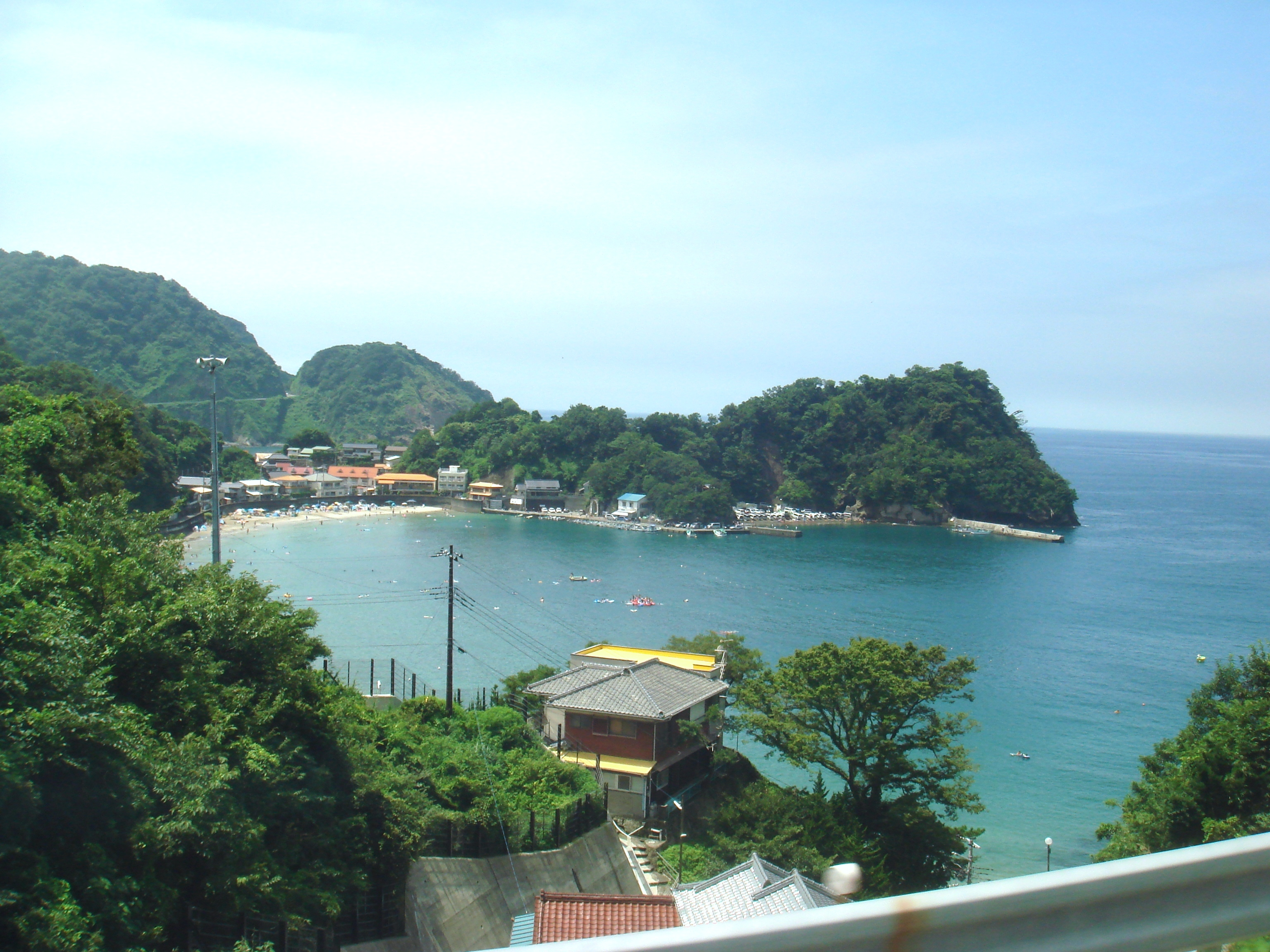
Iwachi shore

Iwachi (岩地) is an administrative part of the town of Matsuzaki, Shizuoka Prefecture, on the west coast of Izu Peninsula, Japan. It has been dubbed the "Izu Côte d'Azur" or "Japanese Côte d'Azur" for its scenic shoreline and the orange roofs of many of its houses.

Iwachi is known for its beach and onsen hot springs.
