= Izu Skyline =

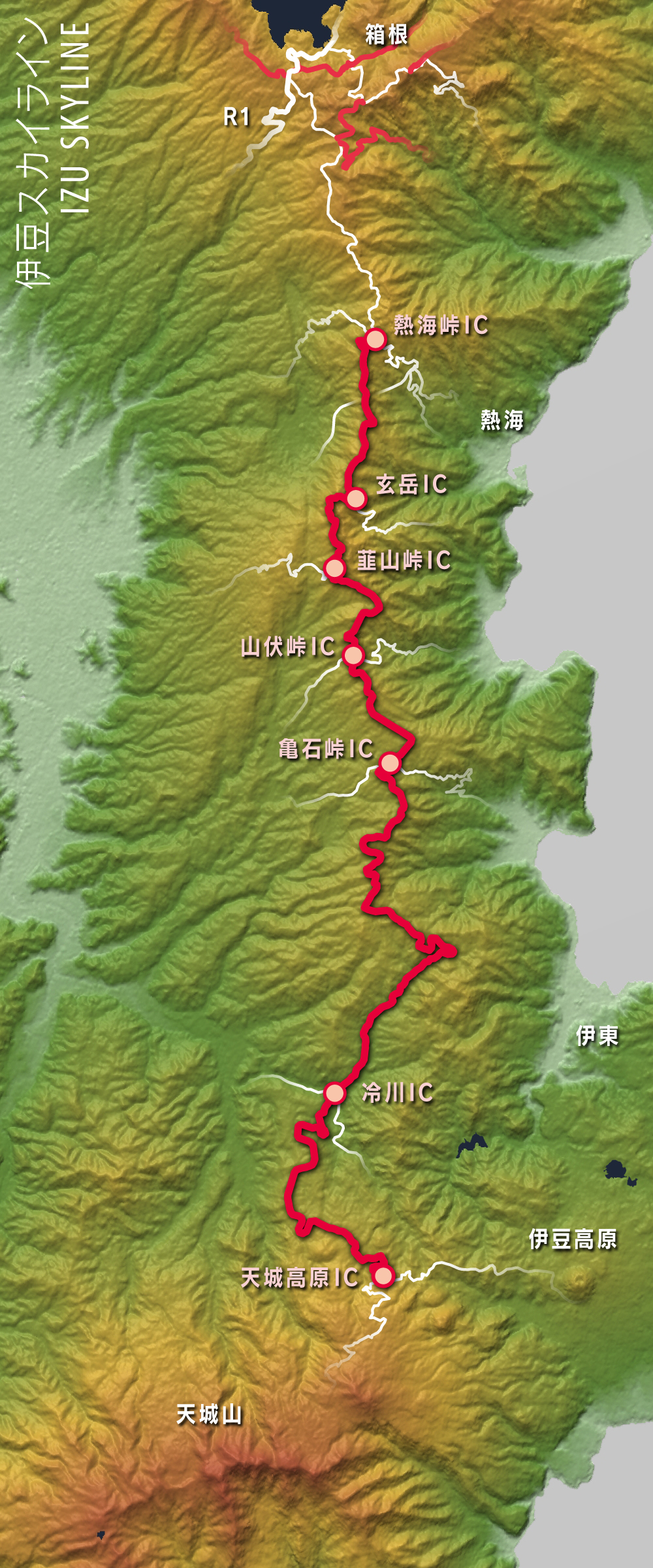
The map of Izu Skyline

Izu Skyline is a toll road through Izu Peninsula in Shizuoka Prefecture. The road measures 40.6 km and leads through mountainous terrain in the eastern part of Izu Peninsula and connects Atami-touge IC near Kannami-cho, Tagata-gun, Shizuoka and Amagi-kougen IC of Atami city.

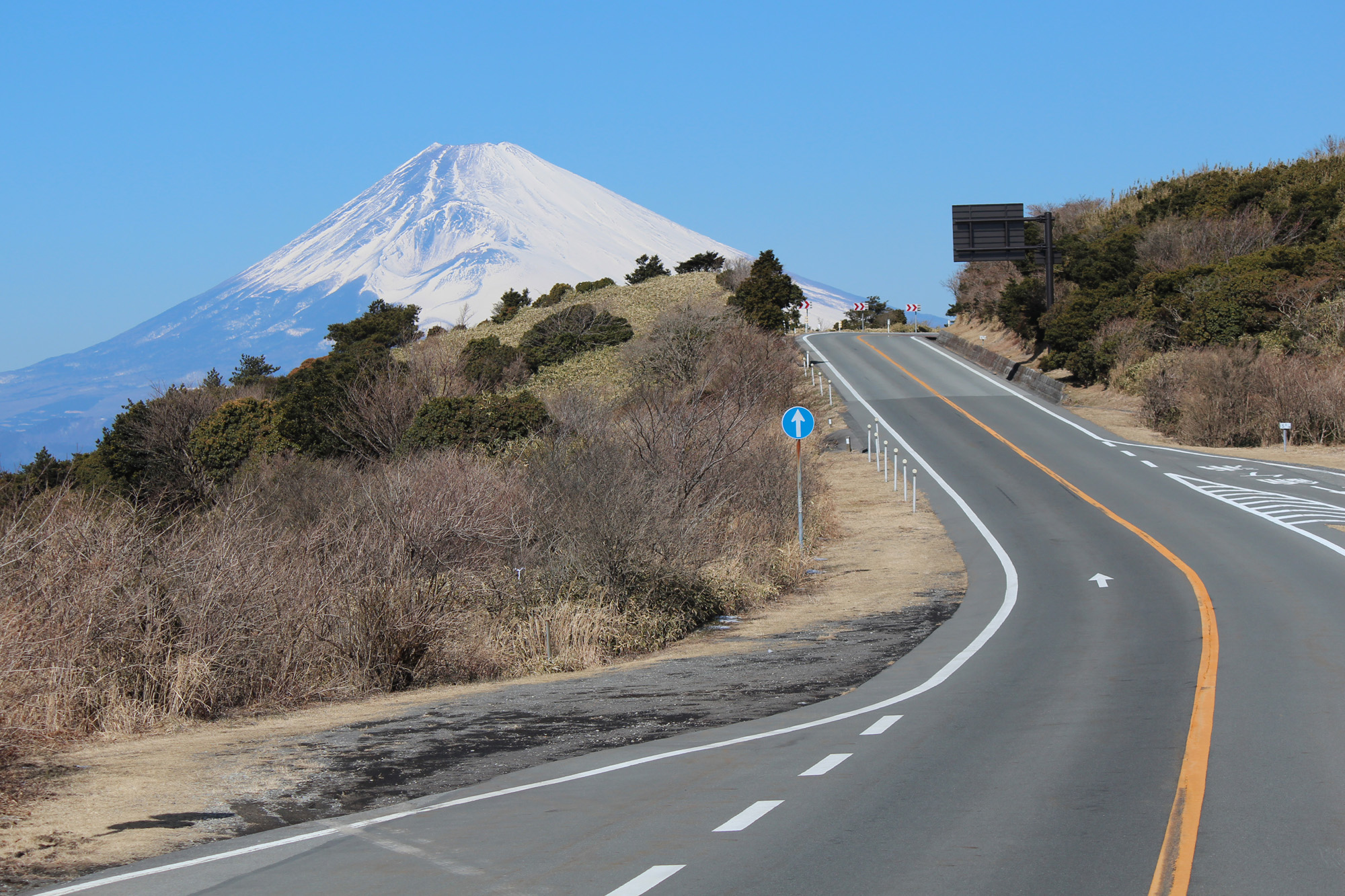
With Mt. Fuji

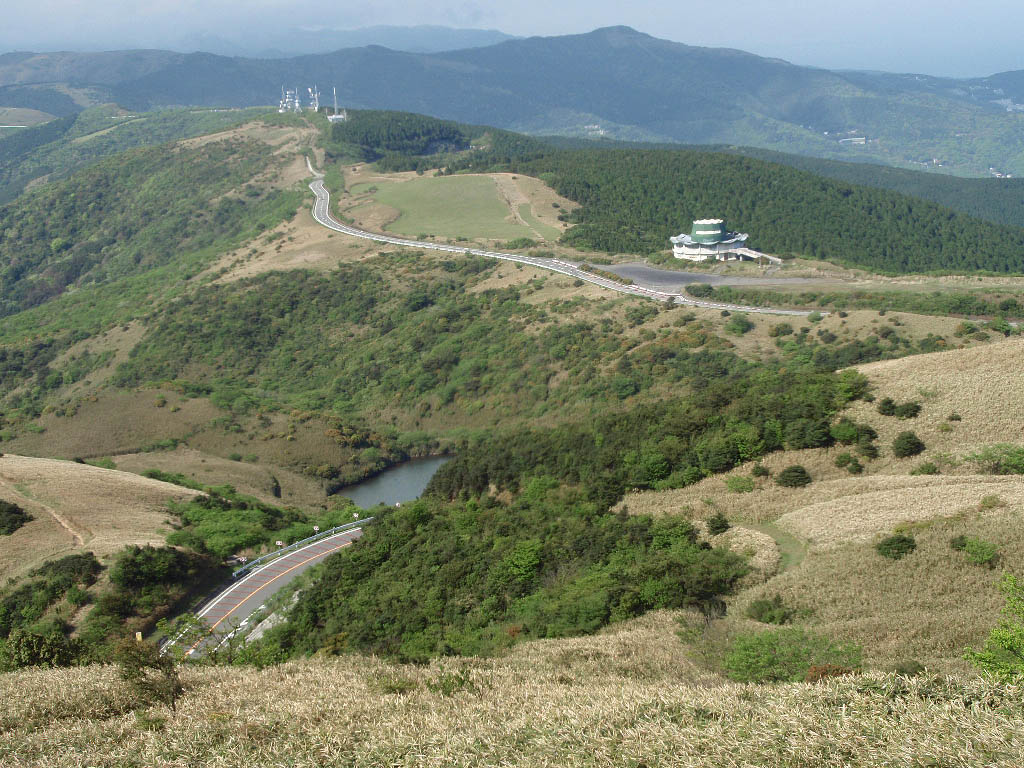
Viewed from Mt.Kurotake

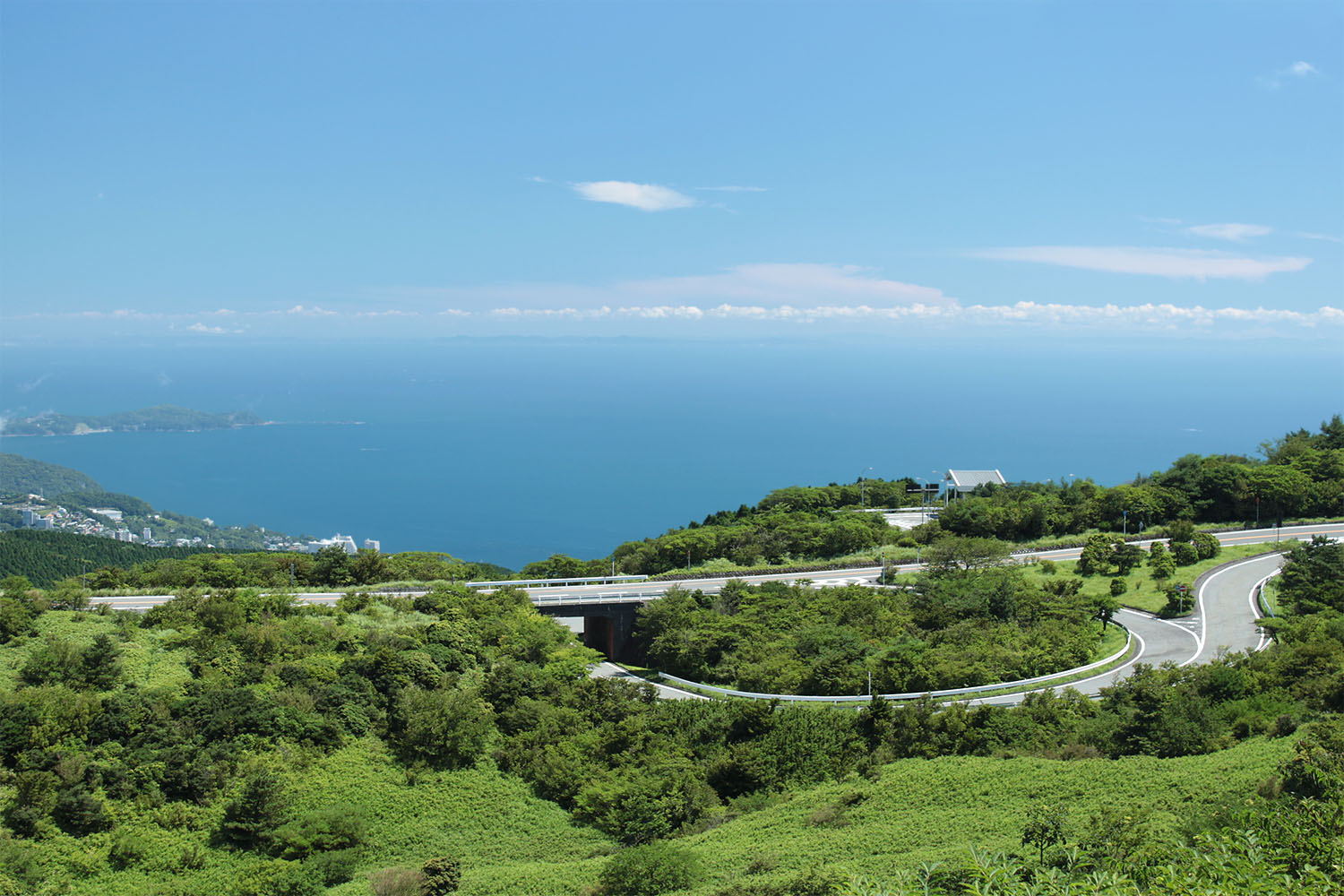
Kurotake IC
