= Minamiizu =

Minamiizu 南伊豆町
- Town
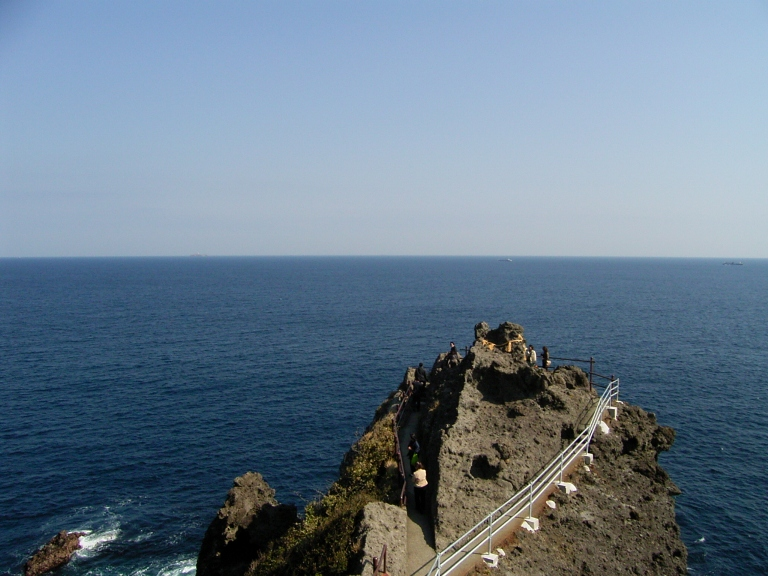
- Cape Irōzaki in Minamiizu

- Flag Seal
- Interactive map of Minamiizu
- Coordinates: 34°39′N 138°52′E
- Country: Japan
- Region: Chūbu; Tōkai
- Prefecture: Shizuoka
- District: Kamo

Area
  - Total: 110.58 km^{2} (42.70 sq mi)

Population (July 2019)
  - Total: 8,231
  - Density: 74.43/km^{2} (192.8/sq mi)
- Time zone: UTC+9 (Japan Standard Time)
- Phone number: 0558-62-1111
- Address: 328-2 Shimokamo, Minamiizu-chō, Kamo-gun, Shizuoka-ken 415-0303
- Climate: Cfa
- Website: Official website

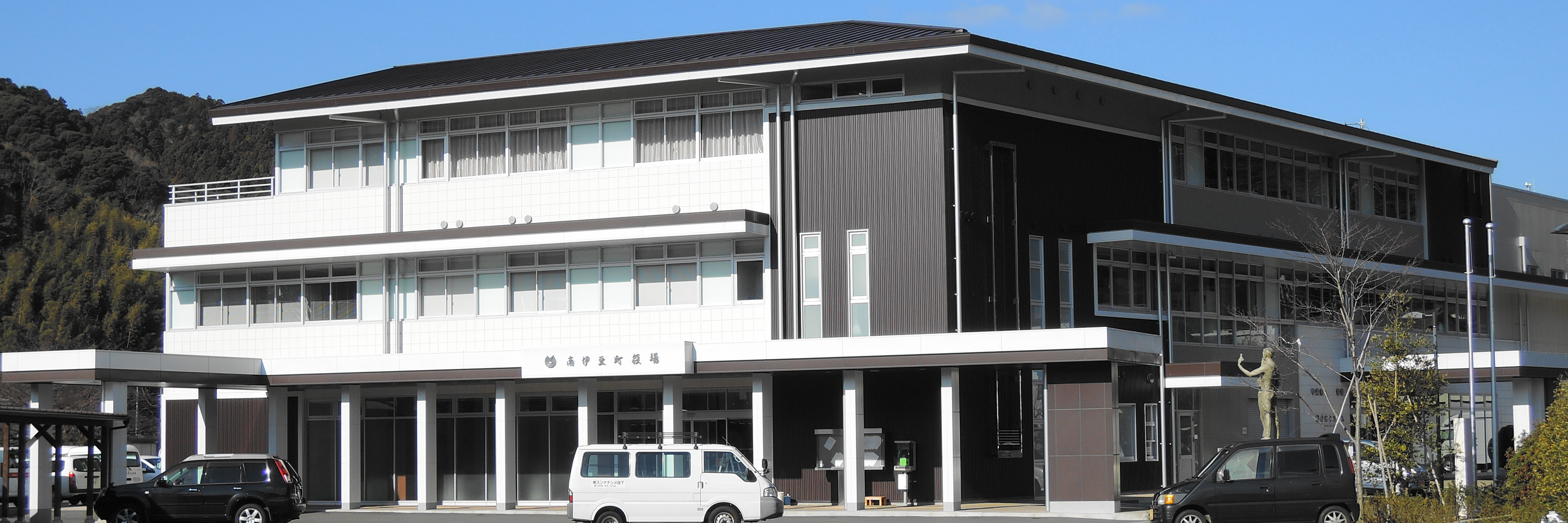
Minamiizu Town Hall

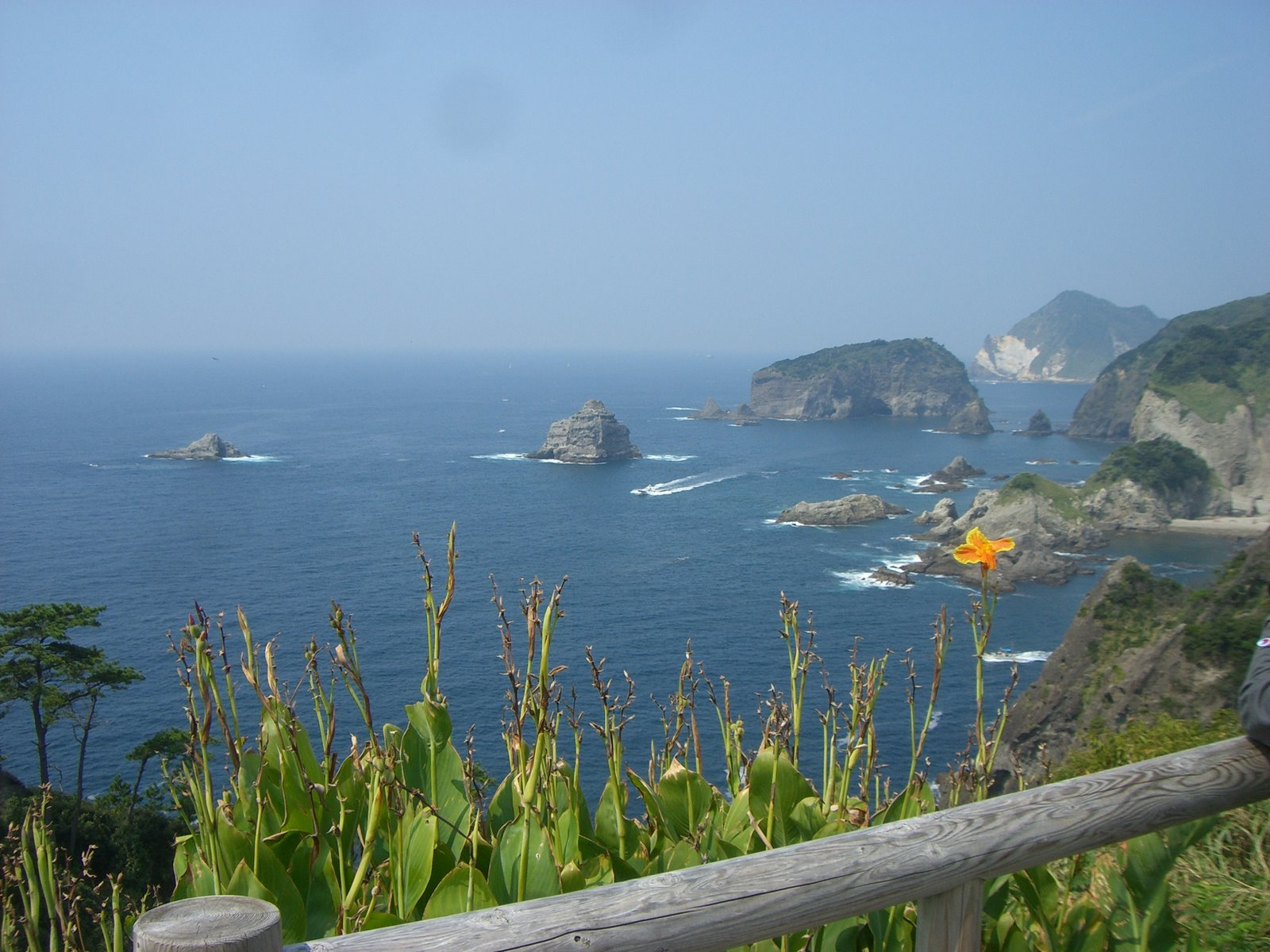
Panorama of Minamiizu coastline

Minamiizu (南伊豆町, Minamiizu-chō) is a town located at the southern tip of Izu Peninsula in Kamo District, Shizuoka Prefecture, Japan. As of 1 July 2019, the town had an estimated population of 8,231 in 3895 households, and a population density of 74 persons per km². The total area of the town is 110.58 square kilometres (42.70 sq mi)

== Geography ==
Minamiizu occupies the southern tip of Izu Peninsula, a hilly region with an indented ria coastline facing the Philippine Sea of the Pacific Ocean. The area has numerous hot springs. Warmed by the warm Kuroshio Current, the area enjoys a warm maritime climate with hot, humid summers and mild, cool winters. Parts of the town are within the borders of Fuji-Hakone-Izu National Park, and the historic Irōzaki Lighthouse is located at the tip of Cape Irōzaki, to the south of town.

=== Neighboring municipalities ===
Shizuoka Prefecture

- Matsuzaki
- Shimoda

=== Climate ===
The city has a climate characterized by hot and humid summers, and relatively mild winters (Köppen climate classification Cfa). The average annual temperature in Minamiizu is 16.3 °C. The average annual rainfall is 2028 mm with September as the wettest month. The temperatures are highest on average in August, at around 26.1 °C, and lowest in January, at around 7.3 °C.

Climate data for Cape Irōzaki, Minamiizu (1991−2020 normals, extremes 1939−present)
Month	Jan	Feb	Mar	Apr	May	Jun	Jul	Aug	Sep	Oct	Nov	Dec	Year
Record high °C (°F)	19.2 (66.6)	20.2 (68.4)	21.5 (70.7)	24.3 (75.7)	27.0 (80.6)	30.8 (87.4)	33.9 (93.0)	33.8 (92.8)	33.1 (91.6)	29.6 (85.3)	25.9 (78.6)	22.2 (72.0)	33.9 (93.0)
Mean maximum °C (°F)	15.9 (60.6)	17.1 (62.8)	19.3 (66.7)	22.1 (71.8)	24.6 (76.3)	27.4 (81.3)	30.4 (86.7)	31.4 (88.5)	30.1 (86.2)	26.7 (80.1)	22.5 (72.5)	18.8 (65.8)	31.6 (88.9)
Mean daily maximum °C (°F)	11.0 (51.8)	11.5 (52.7)	14.0 (57.2)	17.9 (64.2)	21.2 (70.2)	23.6 (74.5)	27.0 (80.6)	28.8 (83.8)	26.3 (79.3)	22.1 (71.8)	17.9 (64.2)	13.4 (56.1)	19.6 (67.2)
Daily mean °C (°F)	8.2 (46.8)	8.5 (47.3)	11.0 (51.8)	14.9 (58.8)	18.4 (65.1)	21.1 (70.0)	24.5 (76.1)	26.2 (79.2)	23.9 (75.0)	19.7 (67.5)	15.4 (59.7)	10.8 (51.4)	16.9 (62.4)
Mean daily minimum °C (°F)	5.7 (42.3)	5.7 (42.3)	8.1 (46.6)	12.1 (53.8)	16.0 (60.8)	19.1 (66.4)	22.7 (72.9)	24.3 (75.7)	21.8 (71.2)	17.5 (63.5)	13.0 (55.4)	8.3 (46.9)	14.5 (58.2)
Mean minimum °C (°F)	1.7 (35.1)	1.7 (35.1)	3.6 (38.5)	6.5 (43.7)	12.1 (53.8)	15.7 (60.3)	19.3 (66.7)	21.1 (70.0)	17.5 (63.5)	13.1 (55.6)	8.6 (47.5)	3.9 (39.0)	0.9 (33.6)
Record low °C (°F)	−2.1 (28.2)	−2.7 (27.1)	−0.8 (30.6)	3.4 (38.1)	8.4 (47.1)	13.2 (55.8)	14.8 (58.6)	17.4 (63.3)	13.2 (55.8)	9.3 (48.7)	3.8 (38.8)	−0.7 (30.7)	−2.7 (27.1)
Average precipitation mm (inches)	67.7 (2.67)	92.4 (3.64)	147.5 (5.81)	152.2 (5.99)	176.9 (6.96)	236.8 (9.32)	203.3 (8.00)	124.9 (4.92)	186.4 (7.34)	193.8 (7.63)	126.6 (4.98)	72.7 (2.86)	1,758.2 (69.22)
Average snowfall cm (inches)	0 (0)	trace	0 (0)	0 (0)	0 (0)	0 (0)	0 (0)	0 (0)	0 (0)	0 (0)	0 (0)	0 (0)	trace
Average precipitation days (≥ 1.0 mm)	5.9	6.9	10.1	9.7	10.3	12.2	9.6	6.6	10.6	9.9	8.5	6.7	107
Average snowy days (≥ 1 cm)	0	0.1	0	0	0	0	0	0	0	0	0	0	0.1
Average relative humidity (%)	60	61	66	72	78	85	88	85	80	72	67	62	73
Mean monthly sunshine hours	181.8	173.3	183.5	192.3	198.4	141.4	169.6	228.4	179.3	163.9	161.8	181.7	2,152.7
Source: Japan Meteorological Agency

== Demographics ==
Per Japanese census data, the population of Minamiizu has been in decline over the past 60 years.

Historical population
Year	Pop.	±%
1940	13,383	—
1950	17,696	+32.2%
1960	14,547	−17.8%
1970	12,219	−16.0%
1980	11,722	−4.1%
1990	11,200	−4.5%
2000	10,304	−8.0%
2010	9,512	−7.7%

== History ==
During the Edo period, all of Izu Province was tenryō territory under direct control of the Tokugawa shogunate, and the area now comprising Minamiizu Town consisted of 25 villages. With the establishment of the modern municipalities system of the early Meiji period in 1889, the area was reorganized into six villages (Minamizaka, Minaminaka, Minamikami, Mizaka, Mihama and Chikuma) within Kamo District. The town of Minamiizu was formed in July 1955 through the merger of these six villages.

Around March 31, 2010, the city of Shimoda and three municipalities in Kamo District (Kawazu, Matsuzaki, and Minamiizu) were scheduled to merge. However, the merger backed out.

== Economy ==
Tourism based on water sports and the hot spring industry, commercial fishing and farming are mainstays of the local economy.

== Education ==
Minamiizu has three public elementary schools and two public junior high schools operated by the town government. The town has one public high school operated by the Shizuoka Prefectural Board of Education.

== Transportation ==
=== Railway ===
Minamiizu does not have any passenger railway service.

=== Highway ===
- National Route 136
