= Matsuzaki, Shizuoka =

Matsuzaki 松崎町
- Town
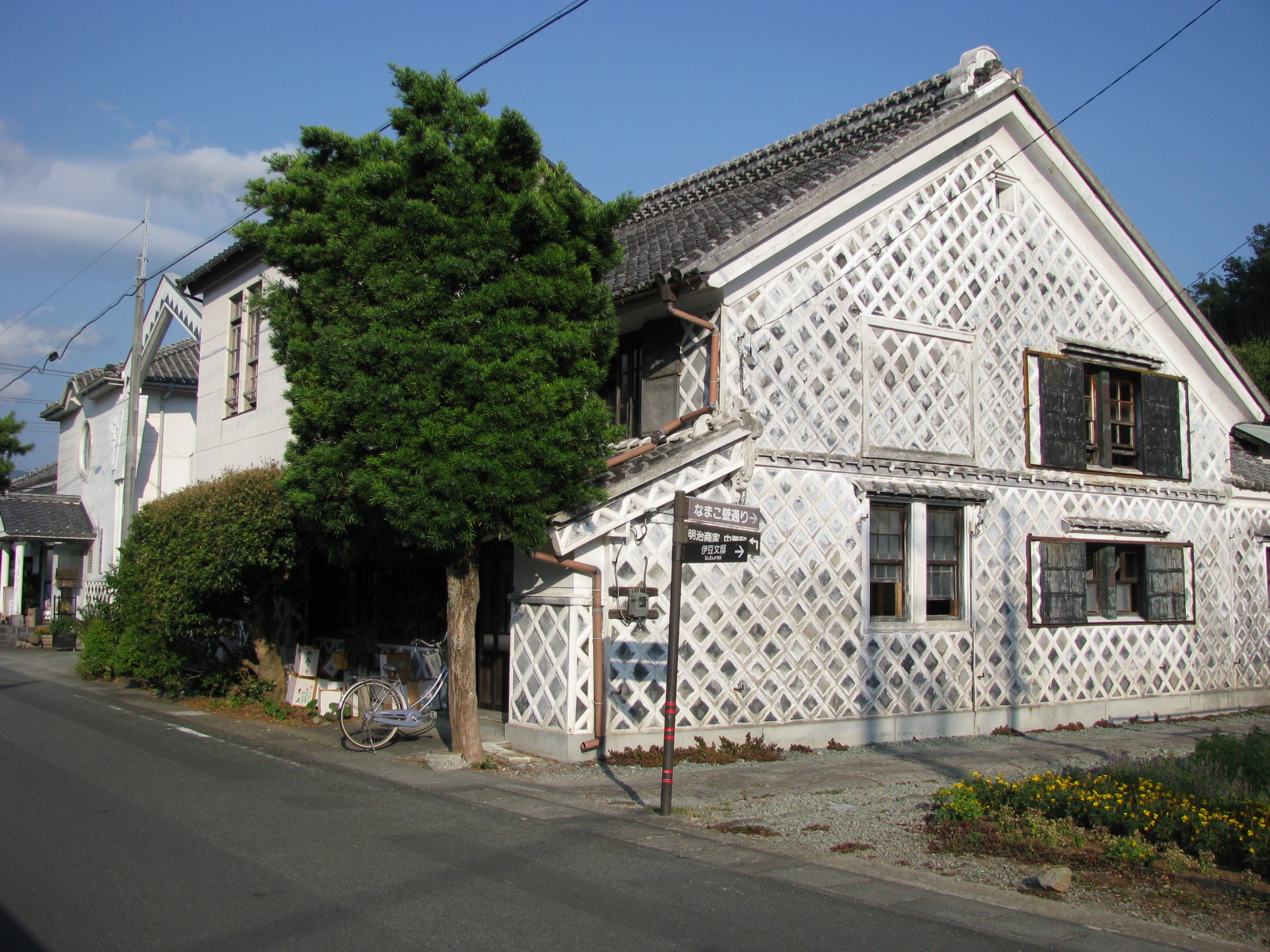
- Namakokabe-style house typical of Matsuzaki

- Flag Seal
- Interactive map of Matsuzaki
- Coordinates: 34°45′N 138°47′E
- Country: Japan
- Region: Chūbu; Tōkai
- Prefecture: Shizuoka
- District: Kamo

Area
  - Total: 85.23 km^{2} (32.91 sq mi)

Population (July 31, 2019)
  - Total: 6,563
  - Density: 77.00/km^{2} (199.4/sq mi)
- Time zone: UTC+9 (Japan Standard Time)
- Phone number: 0558-42-1111
- Address: 301-1 Miyauchi, Matsuzaki-chō, Kamo-gun, Shizuoka-ken 410-3696
- Climate: Cfa
- Website: Official website
- Symbols
- Flower: Farfugium
- Tree: Pine

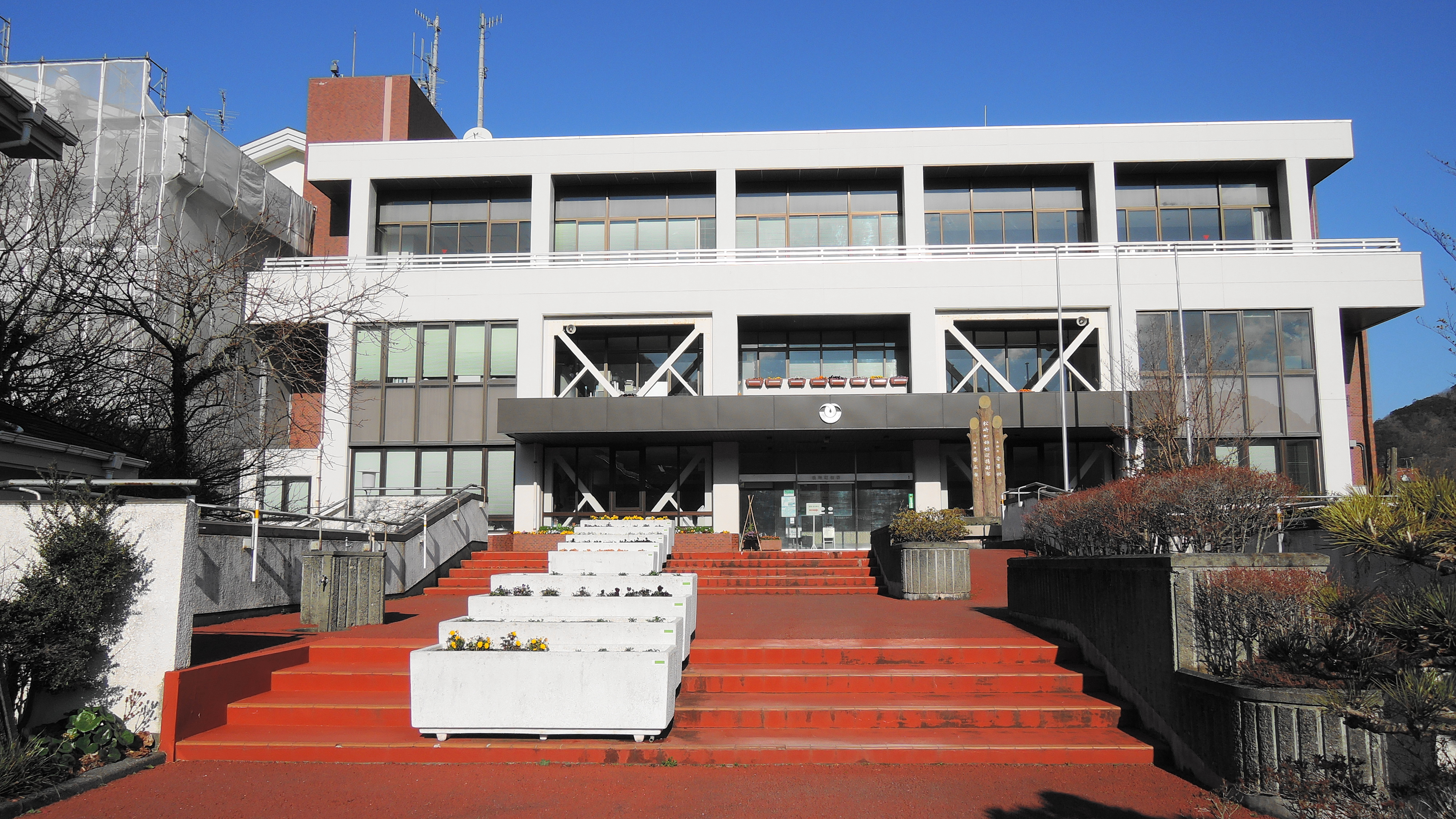
Matsuzaki Town Hall

Matsuzaki (松崎町, Matsuzaki-chō) is a town located in on the southwest coast of Izu Peninsula in Kamo District, Shizuoka Prefecture, Japan. As of 31 July 2019, the town had an estimated population of 6,563 in 2969 households, and a population density of 77 persons per km². The total area of the town is 85.23 square kilometres (32.91 sq mi). Sakuramochi is a noted local specialty. Matsuzaki is listed as one of The Most Beautiful Villages in Japan.

== Geography ==
Matsuzaki is located on the southwest coast of Izu Peninsula, facing Suruga Bay on the Pacific Ocean. It is a hilly region with an indented ria coastline. The area has numerous hot springs. Warmed by the warm Kuroshio Current, the area enjoys a warm maritime climate with hot, humid summers and mild, cool winters. Parts of the town are within the borders of Fuji-Hakone-Izu National Park.

=== Neighboring municipalities ===
Shizuoka Prefecture

- Kawazu
- Minamiizu
- Nishiizu
- Shimoda

=== Demographics ===
Per Japanese census data, the population of Matsuzaki has been in slow decline over the past 50 years.

Historical population
Year	Pop.	±%
1940	11,480	—
1950	14,162	+23.4%
1960	12,183	−14.0%
1970	10,425	−14.4%
1980	10,013	−4.0%
1990	9,266	−7.5%
2000	8,515	−8.1%
2010	7,642	−10.3%

=== Climate ===
The city has a climate characterized by hot and humid summers, and relatively mild winters (Köppen climate classification Cfa). The average annual temperature in Matsuzaki is 16.4 °C (61.5 °F). The average annual rainfall is 1,962.1 mm (77.25 in) with July as the wettest month. The temperatures are highest on average in August, at around 26.5 °C (79.7 °F), and lowest in January, at around 7.0 °C (44.6 °F).

Climate data for Matsuzaki (1991−2020 normals, extremes 1978−present)
Month	Jan	Feb	Mar	Apr	May	Jun	Jul	Aug	Sep	Oct	Nov	Dec	Year
Record high °C (°F)	19.0 (66.2)	22.0 (71.6)	24.4 (75.9)	27.6 (81.7)	29.4 (84.9)	35.0 (95.0)	36.0 (96.8)	37.0 (98.6)	34.7 (94.5)	31.0 (87.8)	27.4 (81.3)	23.3 (73.9)	37.0 (98.6)
Mean daily maximum °C (°F)	11.4 (52.5)	12.1 (53.8)	15.0 (59.0)	19.3 (66.7)	23.4 (74.1)	25.7 (78.3)	29.3 (84.7)	31.0 (87.8)	28.1 (82.6)	23.5 (74.3)	18.7 (65.7)	13.9 (57.0)	21.0 (69.7)
Daily mean °C (°F)	7.0 (44.6)	7.5 (45.5)	10.3 (50.5)	14.5 (58.1)	18.4 (65.1)	21.7 (71.1)	25.4 (77.7)	26.5 (79.7)	23.5 (74.3)	18.7 (65.7)	13.9 (57.0)	9.3 (48.7)	16.4 (61.5)
Mean daily minimum °C (°F)	2.1 (35.8)	2.3 (36.1)	5.0 (41.0)	9.2 (48.6)	13.7 (56.7)	18.4 (65.1)	22.3 (72.1)	23.1 (73.6)	19.8 (67.6)	14.4 (57.9)	9.2 (48.6)	4.4 (39.9)	12.0 (53.6)
Record low °C (°F)	−5.9 (21.4)	−6.0 (21.2)	−4.4 (24.1)	−1.1 (30.0)	4.6 (40.3)	10.4 (50.7)	12.5 (54.5)	16.5 (61.7)	8.7 (47.7)	3.7 (38.7)	−0.7 (30.7)	−6.6 (20.1)	−6.6 (20.1)
Average precipitation mm (inches)	73.9 (2.91)	97.4 (3.83)	161.1 (6.34)	174.1 (6.85)	182.0 (7.17)	231.6 (9.12)	246.4 (9.70)	153.7 (6.05)	238.9 (9.41)	198.1 (7.80)	131.2 (5.17)	73.8 (2.91)	1,962.1 (77.25)
Average precipitation days (≥ 1.0 mm)	6.5	6.8	10.4	9.9	10.5	12.3	10.9	7.4	11.0	9.9	8.4	6.8	110.8
Mean monthly sunshine hours	185.4	175.4	180.1	192.4	194.7	135.3	161.5	211.3	163.1	158.2	161.7	178.2	2,096.4
Source: Japan Meteorological Agency

== History ==
During the Edo period, all of Izu Province was tenryō territory under direct control of the Tokugawa shogunate, and the area now comprising Matsuzaki Town consisted of 21 villages. With the establishment of the modern municipalities system of the early Meiji period in 1889, the area was divided into 11 villages within Kamo District, and 10 villages within Naka District. After the abolishment of Naka District, all 21 villages were reunited under Kamo District. Matsuzaki Village was elevated to town status in 1901. The town annexed neighboring Nakagawa Village in 1955 and Iwashina Village in 1956.

Around March 31, 2010, the city of Shimoda and three municipalities in Kamo District (Kawazu, Matsuzaki, and Minamiizu) were scheduled to merge. However, the merger backed out.

== Economy ==
The economy of Matsuzaki is dominated by commercial fishing, forestry and the tourist industry centered on hot spring resorts. Some 64% of the area is forest.

== Education ==
Matsuzaki has one public elementary school and one public junior high school operated by the town government. The town has one public high school operated by the Shizuoka Prefectural Board of Education.

== Transportation ==
=== Highway ===
- National Route 135

== Notable people from Matsuzaki ==
- Yoda Benzō - Hokkaido pioneer
- Irie Chōhachi - artist
- Kondō Heisaburō - pharmacologist
- Rentarō Mikuni - actor

== Gallery ==
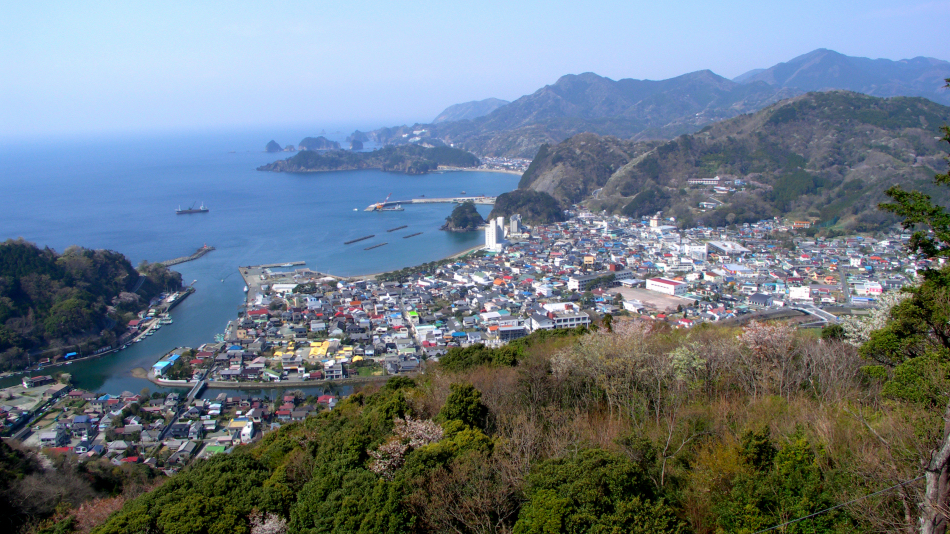
Downtown Matsuzaki

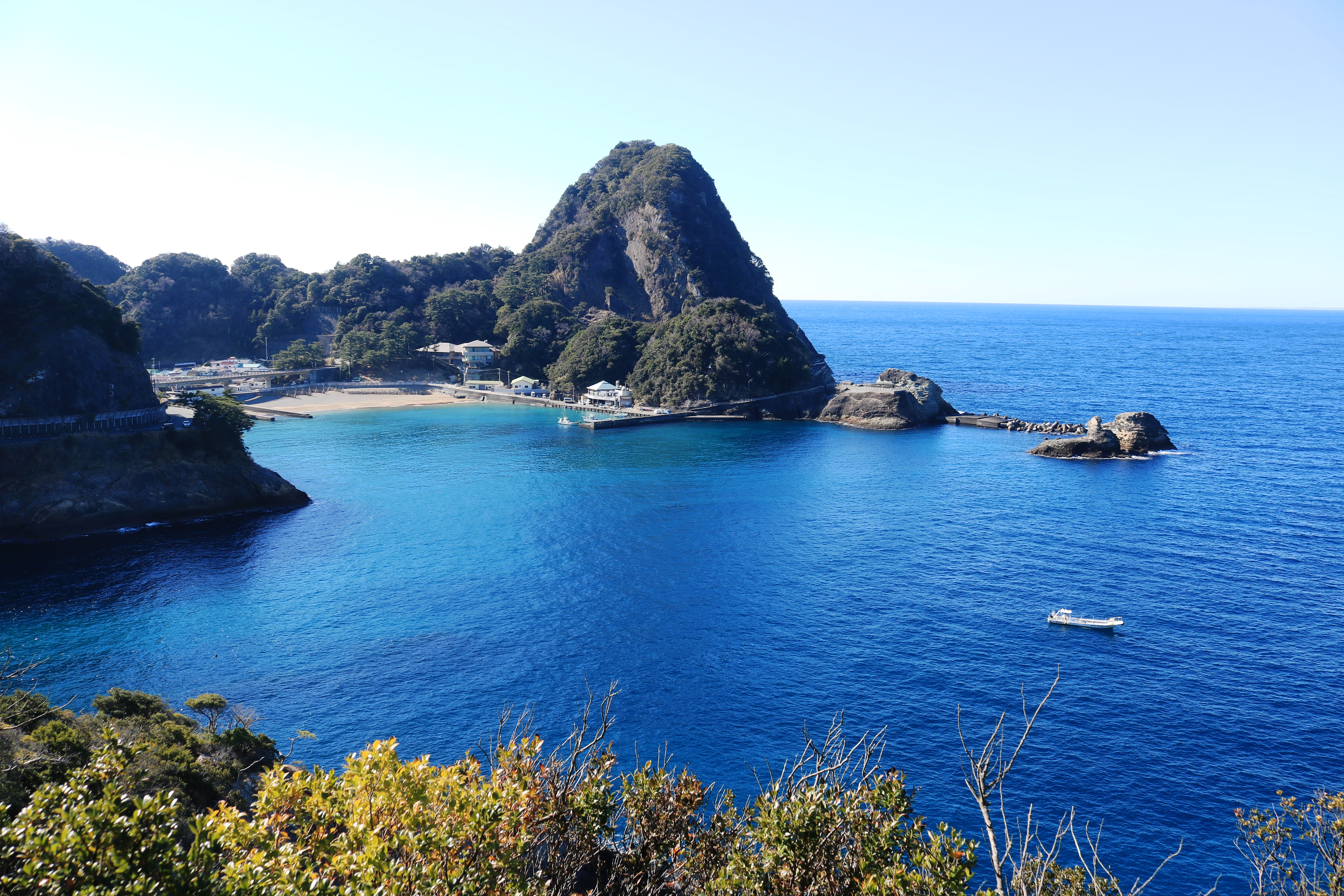
Port of Kumomi and Mount Eboshi

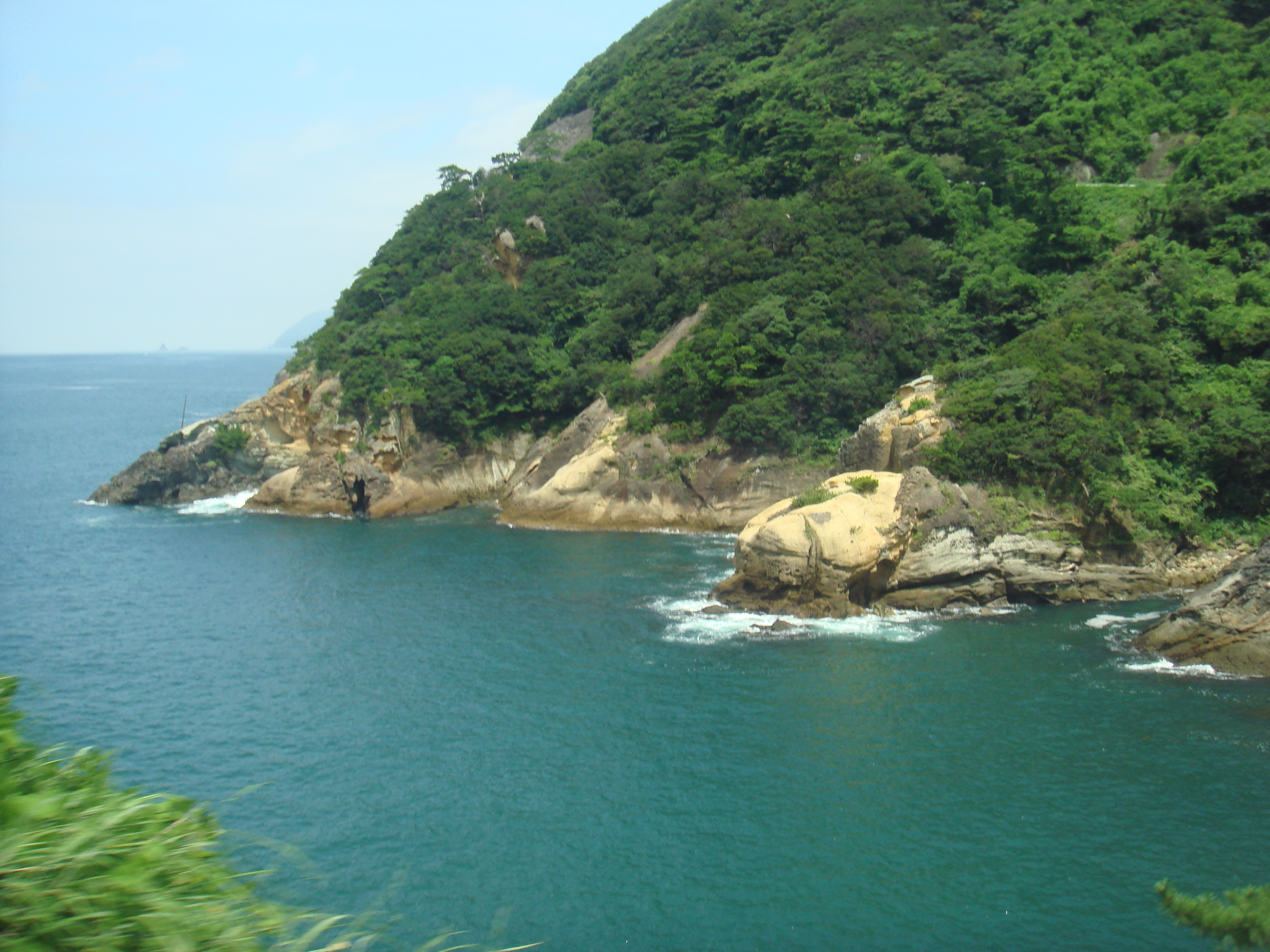
Matsuzaki Kumomi shoreline

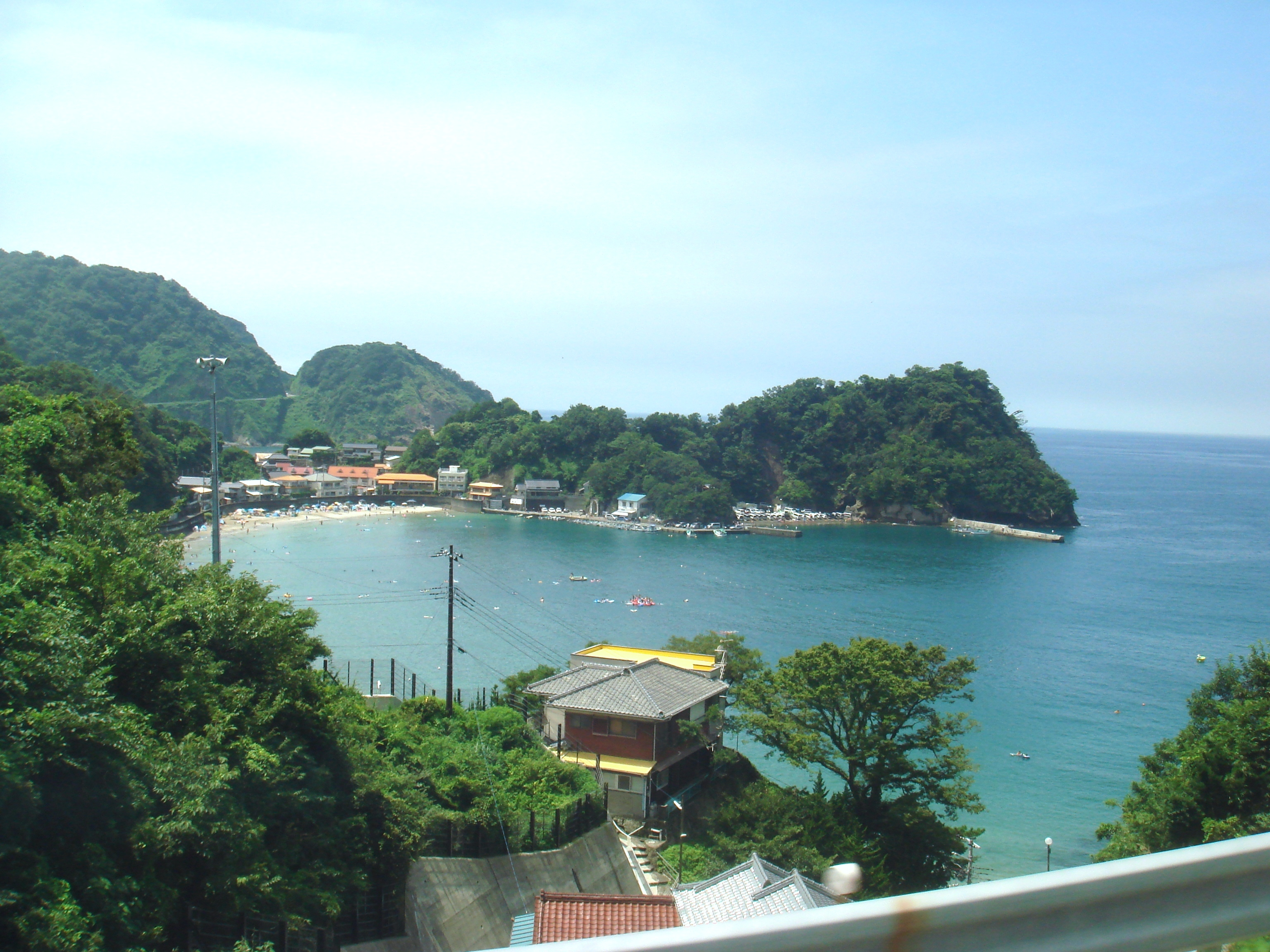
Iwachi shore (岩地海岸), also dubbed "Izu Côte d'Azur", in Matsuzaki
