= Cape Irōzaki =

Headland on the Izu Peninsula, Japan

Cape Irōzaki 石廊崎, Irō Zaki, Cape Iro, Irō-saki
- Cape
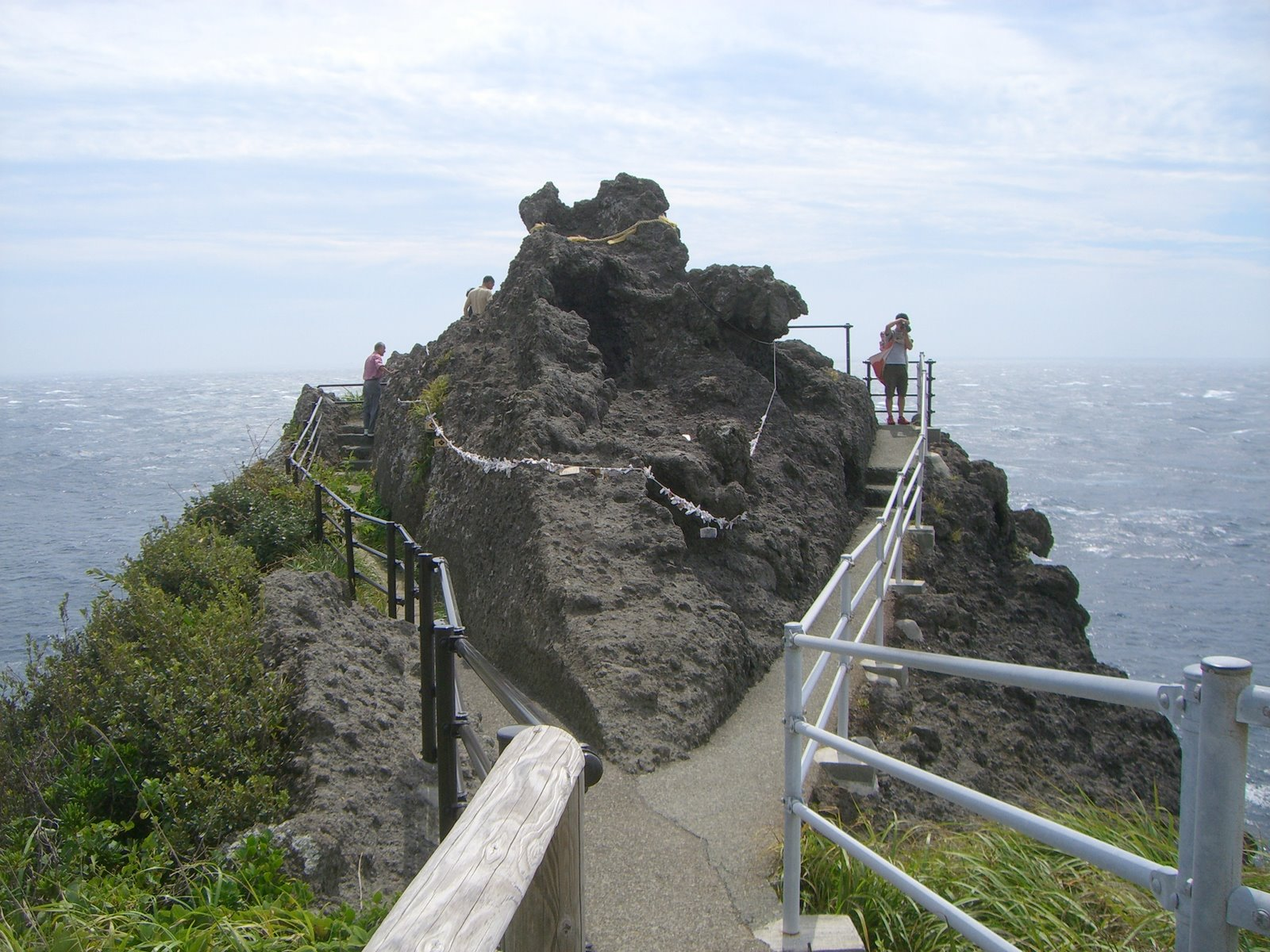
- Viewpoint and shimenawa encircling rock at Cape Irōzaki

- Irōzaki Cape Irōzaki (Japan)
- Coordinates: 34°36′09″N 138°50′42″E
- Location: Izu Peninsula, Japan

Cape Irōzaki (石廊崎, Irōzaki) is a headland on southernmost point on the Izu Peninsula on the island of Honshu in Japan. It is located within the borders of the town of Minamiizu, Shizuoka and is within the borders of the Fuji-Hakone-Izu National Park. The cape marks the border between Sagami Bay and Suruga Bay, and the border between the Philippine Sea and the Pacific Ocean.

Irōzaki Lighthouse stands on the cape. The cape also contains a Shinto shrine, the Imuro Jinja, which claims to have been founded in the Nara period.

== Climate ==
Climate data for Cape Irōzaki, Minamiizu (1991−2020 normals, extremes 1939−present)
Month	Jan	Feb	Mar	Apr	May	Jun	Jul	Aug	Sep	Oct	Nov	Dec	Year
Record high °C (°F)	19.2 (66.6)	20.2 (68.4)	21.4 (70.5)	24.3 (75.7)	26.4 (79.5)	30.8 (87.4)	33.9 (93.0)	33.8 (92.8)	31.4 (88.5)	29.6 (85.3)	25.0 (77.0)	22.2 (72.0)	33.9 (93.0)
Mean daily maximum °C (°F)	11.0 (51.8)	11.5 (52.7)	14.0 (57.2)	17.9 (64.2)	21.2 (70.2)	23.6 (74.5)	27.0 (80.6)	28.8 (83.8)	26.3 (79.3)	22.1 (71.8)	17.9 (64.2)	13.4 (56.1)	19.6 (67.2)
Daily mean °C (°F)	8.2 (46.8)	8.5 (47.3)	11.0 (51.8)	14.9 (58.8)	18.4 (65.1)	21.1 (70.0)	24.5 (76.1)	26.2 (79.2)	23.9 (75.0)	19.7 (67.5)	15.4 (59.7)	10.8 (51.4)	16.9 (62.4)
Mean daily minimum °C (°F)	5.7 (42.3)	5.7 (42.3)	8.1 (46.6)	12.1 (53.8)	16.0 (60.8)	19.1 (66.4)	22.7 (72.9)	24.3 (75.7)	21.8 (71.2)	17.5 (63.5)	13.0 (55.4)	8.3 (46.9)	14.5 (58.2)
Record low °C (°F)	−2.1 (28.2)	−2.7 (27.1)	−0.8 (30.6)	3.4 (38.1)	8.4 (47.1)	13.2 (55.8)	14.8 (58.6)	17.4 (63.3)	13.2 (55.8)	9.3 (48.7)	3.8 (38.8)	−0.7 (30.7)	−2.7 (27.1)
Average precipitation mm (inches)	67.7 (2.67)	92.4 (3.64)	147.5 (5.81)	152.2 (5.99)	176.9 (6.96)	236.8 (9.32)	203.3 (8.00)	124.9 (4.92)	186.4 (7.34)	193.8 (7.63)	126.6 (4.98)	72.7 (2.86)	1,758.2 (69.22)
Average snowfall cm (inches)	0 (0)	trace	0 (0)	0 (0)	0 (0)	0 (0)	0 (0)	0 (0)	0 (0)	0 (0)	0 (0)	0 (0)	trace
Average precipitation days (≥ 1.0 mm)	5.9	6.9	10.1	9.7	10.3	12.2	9.6	6.6	10.6	9.9	8.5	6.7	107
Average snowy days (≥ 1 cm)	0	0.1	0	0	0	0	0	0	0	0	0	0	0.1
Average relative humidity (%)	60	61	66	72	78	85	88	85	80	72	67	62	73
Mean monthly sunshine hours	181.8	173.3	183.5	192.3	198.4	141.4	169.6	228.4	179.3	163.9	161.8	181.7	2,152.7
Source: Japan Meteorological Agency

== Gallery ==
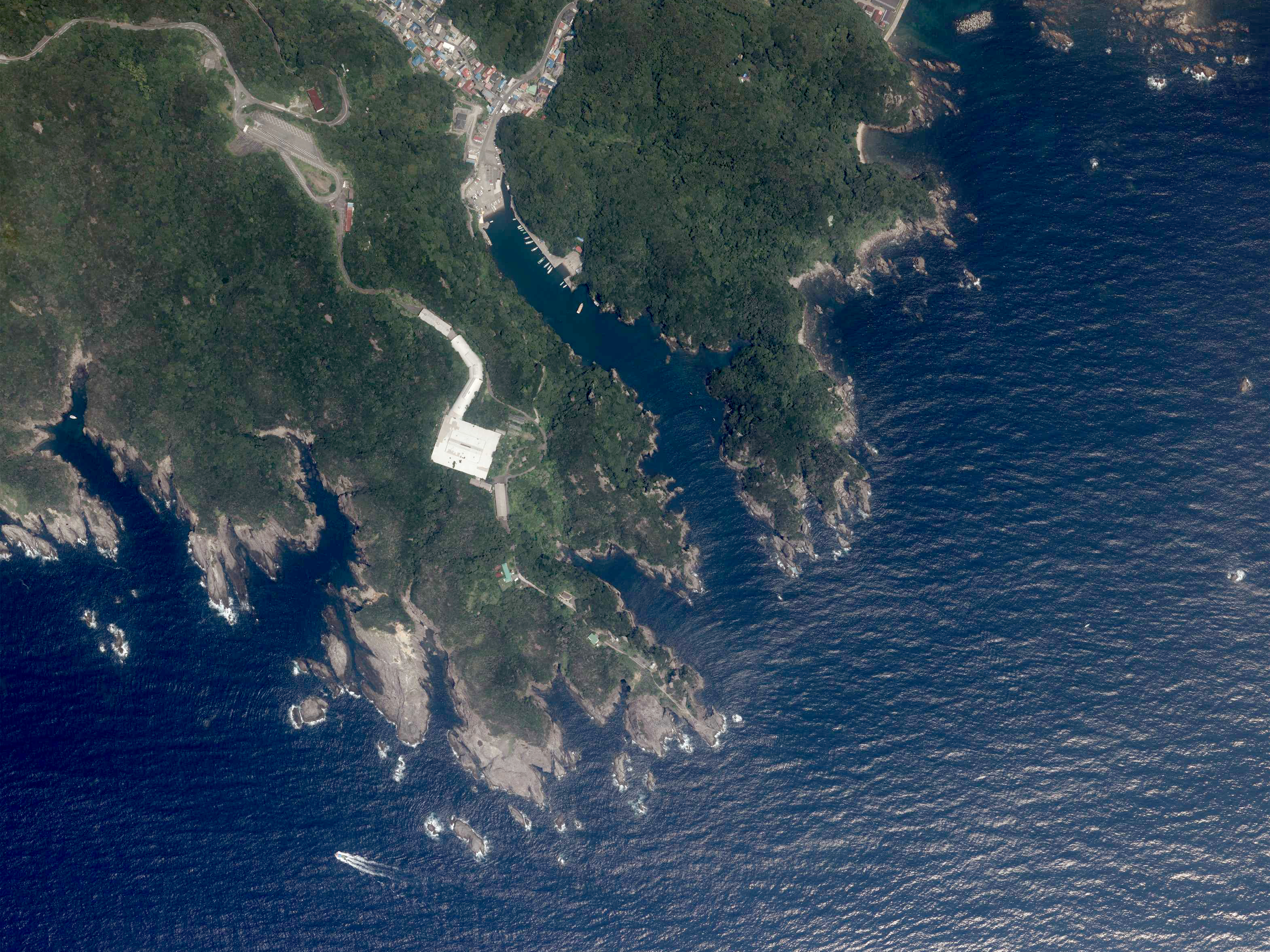
From above

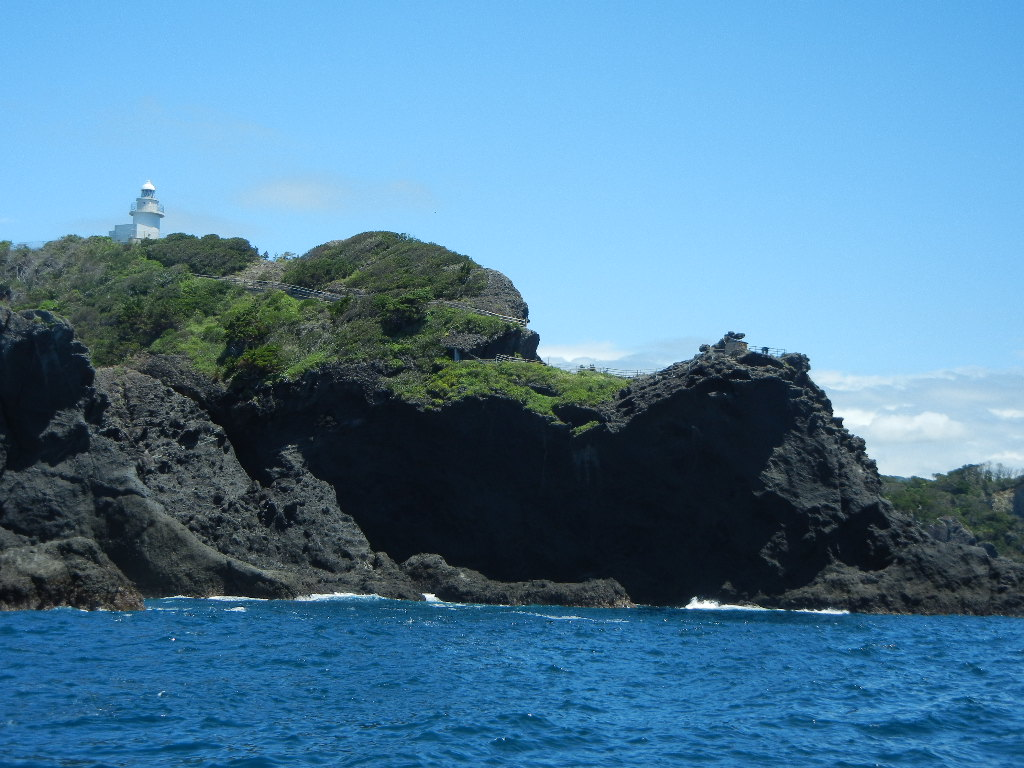
From offshore

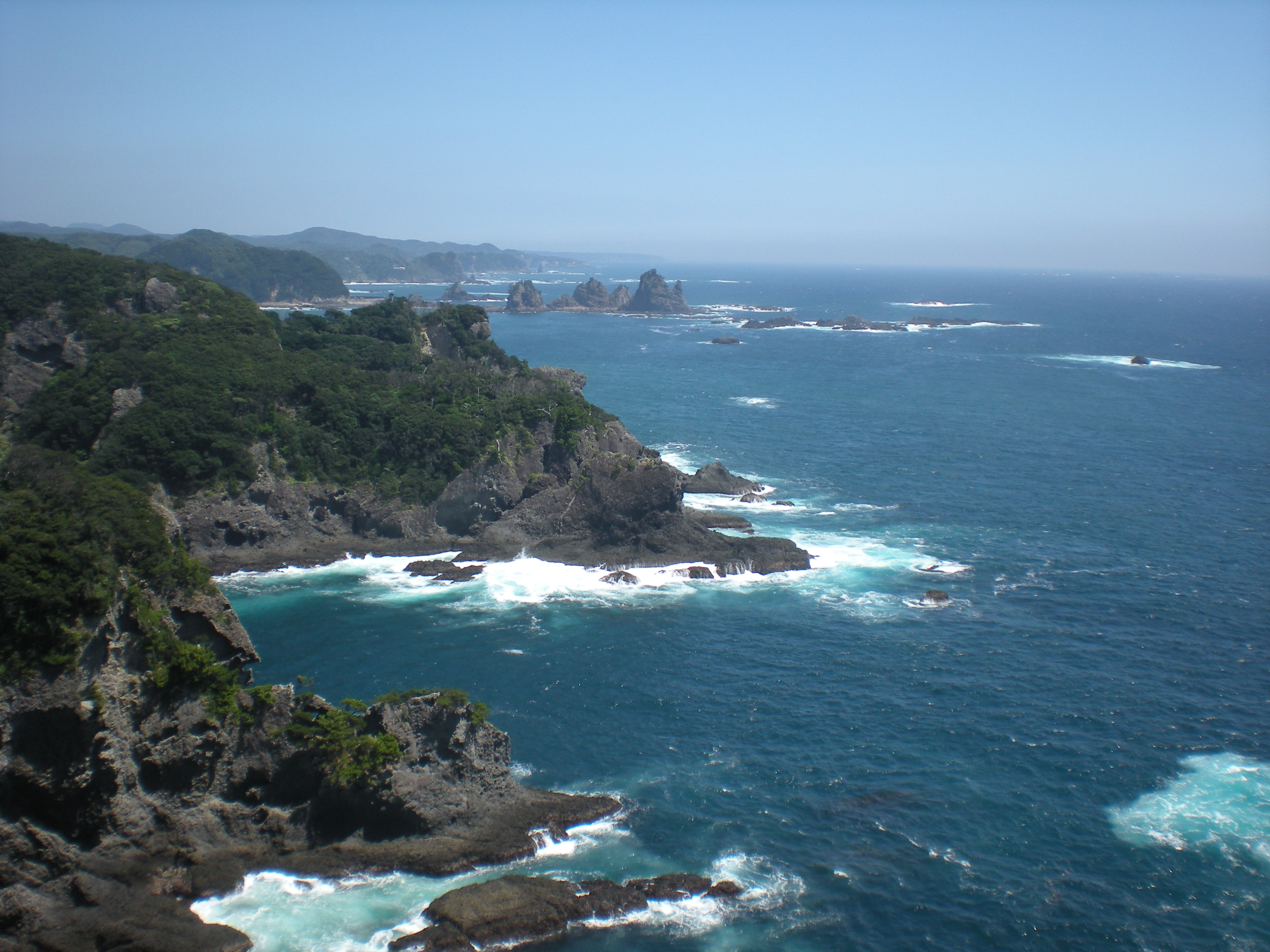
NE view from Irōzaki
