= Izu Peninsula =

Peninsula in Chūbu, Japan

- Peninsula
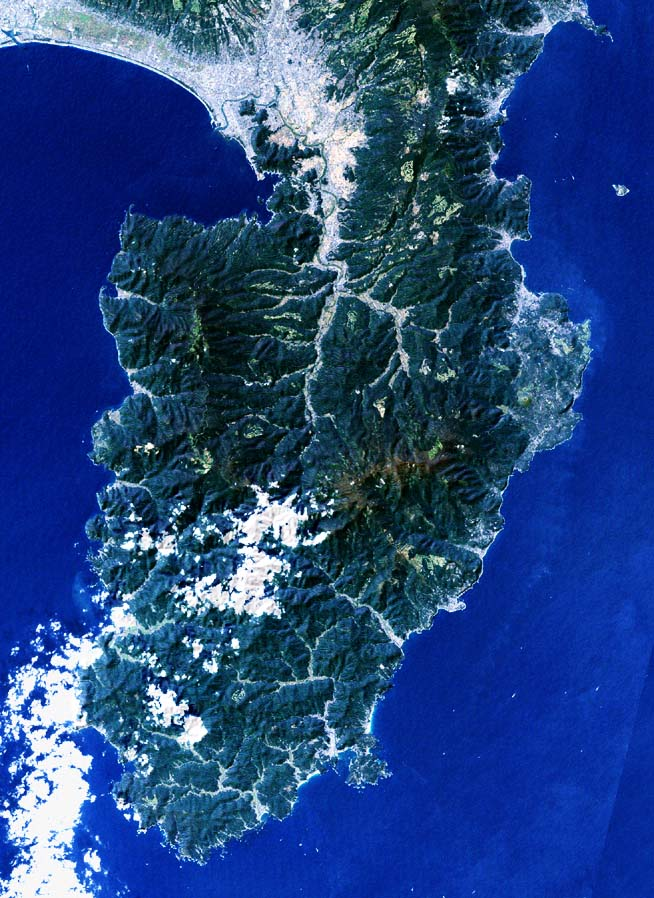
- Landsat image with high-resolution data from Space Shuttle
- Interactive map of Izu Peninsula
- Coordinates: 34°54′N 138°57′E
- Location: Shizuoka Prefecture, Japan

Area
  - Total: 1,421.24 square kilometres (548.74 sq mi)
- Highest elevation: 1,406 metres (4,613 ft) (Mount Amagi)
- National Place of Scenic Beauty

Location

The Izu Peninsula (伊豆半島, Izu Hantō; Japanese pronunciation: [i.(d)zɯ, i.(d)zɯ haꜜn.toː]) is a mountainous peninsula with a deeply indented coastline to the west of Tokyo on the Pacific coast of the island of Honshu, Japan, the largest of the four main islands of Japan. Formerly known as Izu Province, Izu Peninsula is now a part of Shizuoka Prefecture. The peninsula has an area of 1,421.24 km^{2} (548.74 sq mi) and its estimated population in 2005 was 473,942 people. The peninsula's populated areas are located primarily on the north and east.

== Geology ==
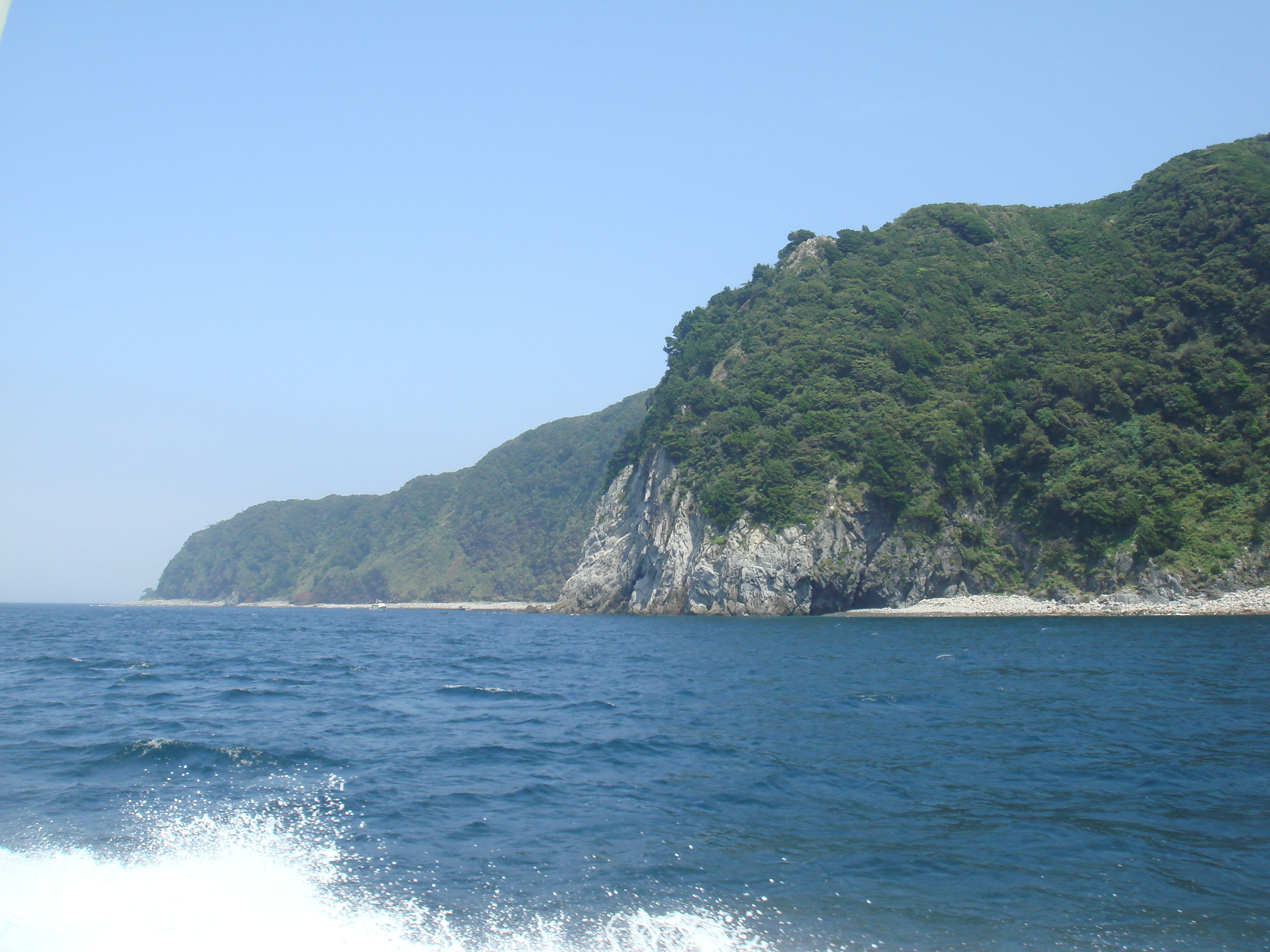
West coast of Izu

Tectonically, the Izu Peninsula results from the Philippine Sea Plate colliding with the Okhotsk Plate at the Nankai Trough. The Philippine Sea Plate, the Amurian Plate, and the Okhotsk Plate meet at Mount Fuji, a triple junction. The peninsula itself lies on the Philippine Sea Plate.

The southern portion of the peninsula is composed largely of breccia, and the central and northern portions consist of numerous highly eroded volcanoes. The Amagi Mountain Range dominates the center of the peninsula with Mount Amagi (1,406 metres (4,613 ft)) and Mount Atami (773 metres (2,536 ft)) in the east and Mount Daruma (982 metres (3,222 ft)) in the west, with the eastern and western portions of the range extending underwater into Sagami Bay and Suruga Bay. The peninsula's major river, the Kano River in the north, flows through a graben valley created by plate tectonics.

As a result of its underlying geology, the peninsula is prone to frequent earthquake swarms and tsunamis, and it abounds in hot springs.

== Administration ==
All of Izu Peninsula is within Shizuoka Prefecture. It is administratively divided into eight cities and five towns:

- Atami
- Itō
- Izu
- Izunokuni
- Numazu
- Mishima
- Shimoda
- Kamo District
  - Higashiizu
  - Kawazu
  - Matsuzaki
  - Minamiizu
  - Nishiizu

== Economics ==
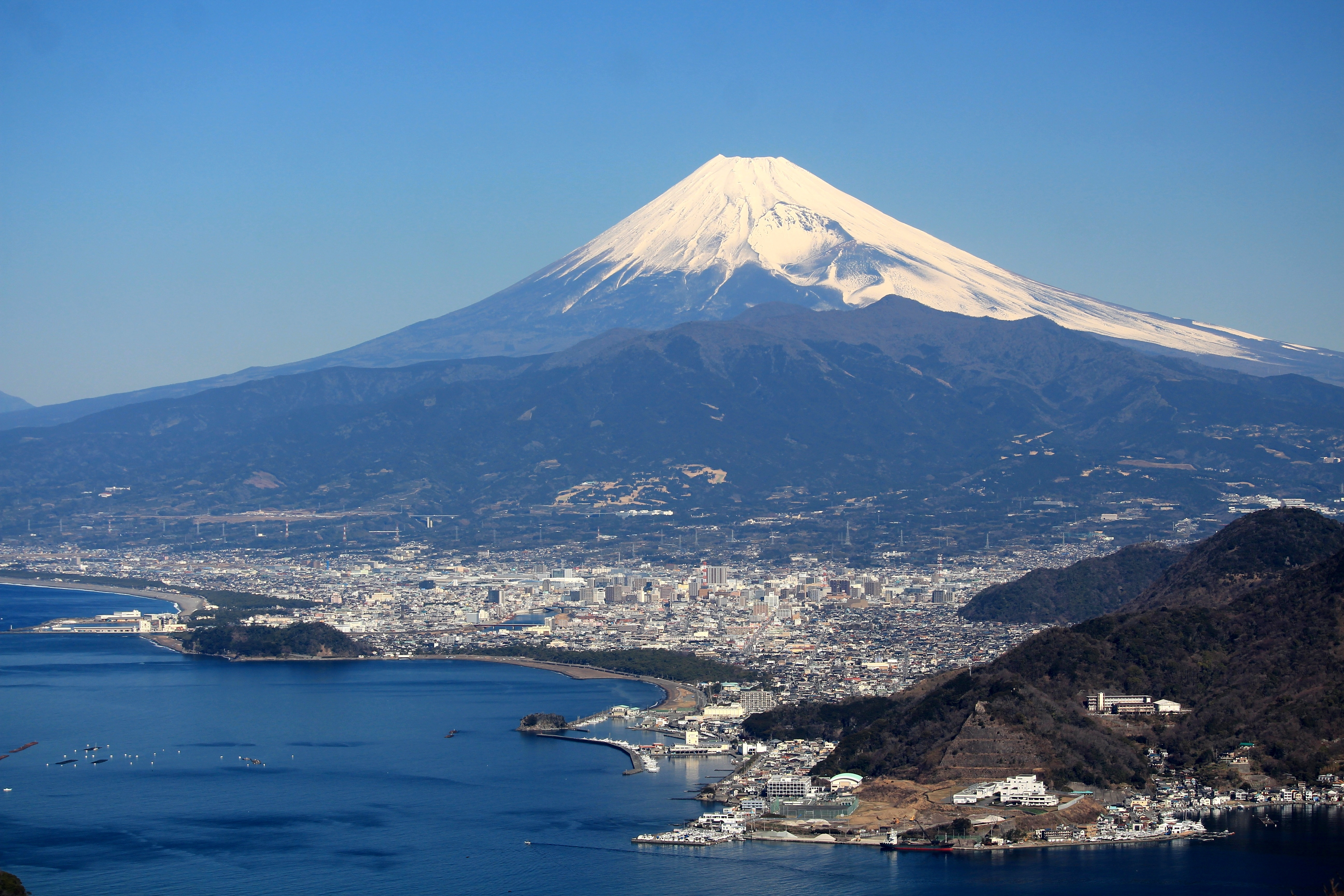
Numazu city with Mount Fuji in the background

A popular resort region for tourists from the Kantō region, the Izu peninsula is primarily known for onsen hot spring resorts in Atami, Shuzenji, and Itō. The area is also popular for sea bathing, surfing, golfing and motorcycle touring. The peninsula abuts Mount Fuji and is a part of Fuji-Hakone-Izu National Park.

The southwest coast of Izu, from the municipalities of Matsuzaki, Nishiizu and Minamiizu was designated a National Place of Scenic Beauty in 1937.

Aside from tourism, agriculture and fishing are the mainstays of the local economy. Izu is one of the biggest producers of wasabi in Japan, and the local cuisine offers dishes flavored with wasabi. Nevertheless, these industries are not lucrative enough to prevent a heavy loss of population to Greater Tokyo and Shizuoka, particularly among the young.

== Access ==
=== Railway ===
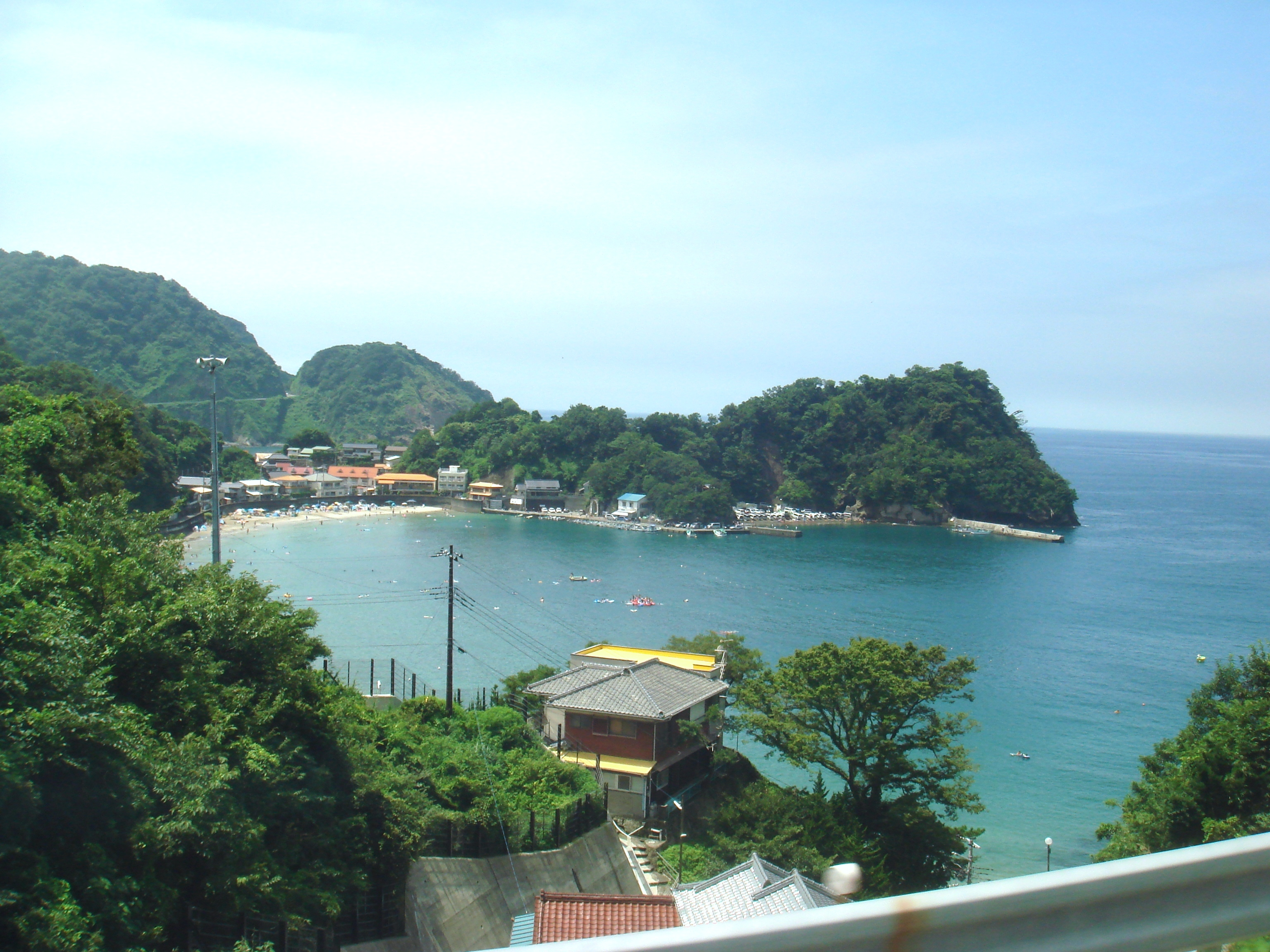
Iwachi shore (岩地海岸), also dubbed "Izu Côte d'Azur", in Matsuzaki.

The northern parts of Izu Peninsula is easily accessible from Tokyo and points west via the Tōkaidō Shinkansen, which has stations in both Atami in the northeast and Mishima in the northwest. JR Itō Line and the Izu Kyūkō Line provides service along the east coast of the peninsula to Shimoda, however given the lack of population, these services are less regular.

Central Izu is served by the Sunzu Line as far as Shuzenji. The west coast of the peninsula is less developed, and has no train service.

=== Roadway ===
Izu Peninsula is served by numerous expressways. By car, it is 103.3 km (64.2 mi) from the Yōga Interchange (用賀インター Yōga Intā) on the Tokyo end of the Tōmei Expressway to Numazu. To get to the eastern side, a branch at Atsugi leads to the Odawara-Atsugi Road, which continues past Odawara to Yugawara, Atami, and Shimoda. Izu Peninsula is also served by Japan National Route 135, Japan National Route 136, and Japan National Route 414. Izu also offers two scenic roads, called "Izu Skyline" (伊豆スカイライン) and "Western Izu Skyline" (西伊豆スカイライン) that offer beautiful views on nature and Mt. Fuji. Both skyline roads are favorite spots of car and motorcycle enthusiasts.

The Odakyu Electric Railway runs local bus services from Odawara and Hakone, and there is an extensive but infrequent internal bus network.

=== Airway ===
On August 12, 1985, Flight JAL 123, while crossing peninsular airspace, experienced an explosion in the aft pressure bulkhead, resulting in an accident that killed 520 people, becoming one of the deadliest air disasters in human history.

== See also ==
- List of Places of Scenic Beauty of Japan (Shizuoka)
