= Fukagawa (surname) =

Fukagawa (Japanese: 深川) is a Japanese surname. Notable people with the surname include:

- Daisuke Fukagawa (born 1999), Japanese footballer
- Itomaro Fukagawa, Japanese photographer and businessman
- Mai Fukagawa (born 1991), Japanese actress and former singer
- Munetoshi Fukagawa (1921–2008), Japanese poet
- Naomi Fukagawa, American nutrition scientist
- Seria Fukagawa (born 1995), Japanese voice actress
- Tomotaka Fukagawa (born 1972), Japanese former footballer
- Yoshihiro Fukagawa (born 1976), Japanese film director
