= Tokutarō Watanabe =

Tokutarō Watanabe was the owner of the A. Farsari & Co. photographic studio. Watanabe initially was the firm's chief operator under the ownership by Adolfo Farsari and then Tonokura Tsunetarō. Following the departure of Tonokura in 1904, Watanabe became the new owner, only to be succeeded by the firm's former secretary Fukagawa Itomaro. A. Farsari & Co. was based in Yokohama, Japan.
