= Adolfo Farsari =

Italian photographer (1841–1898)

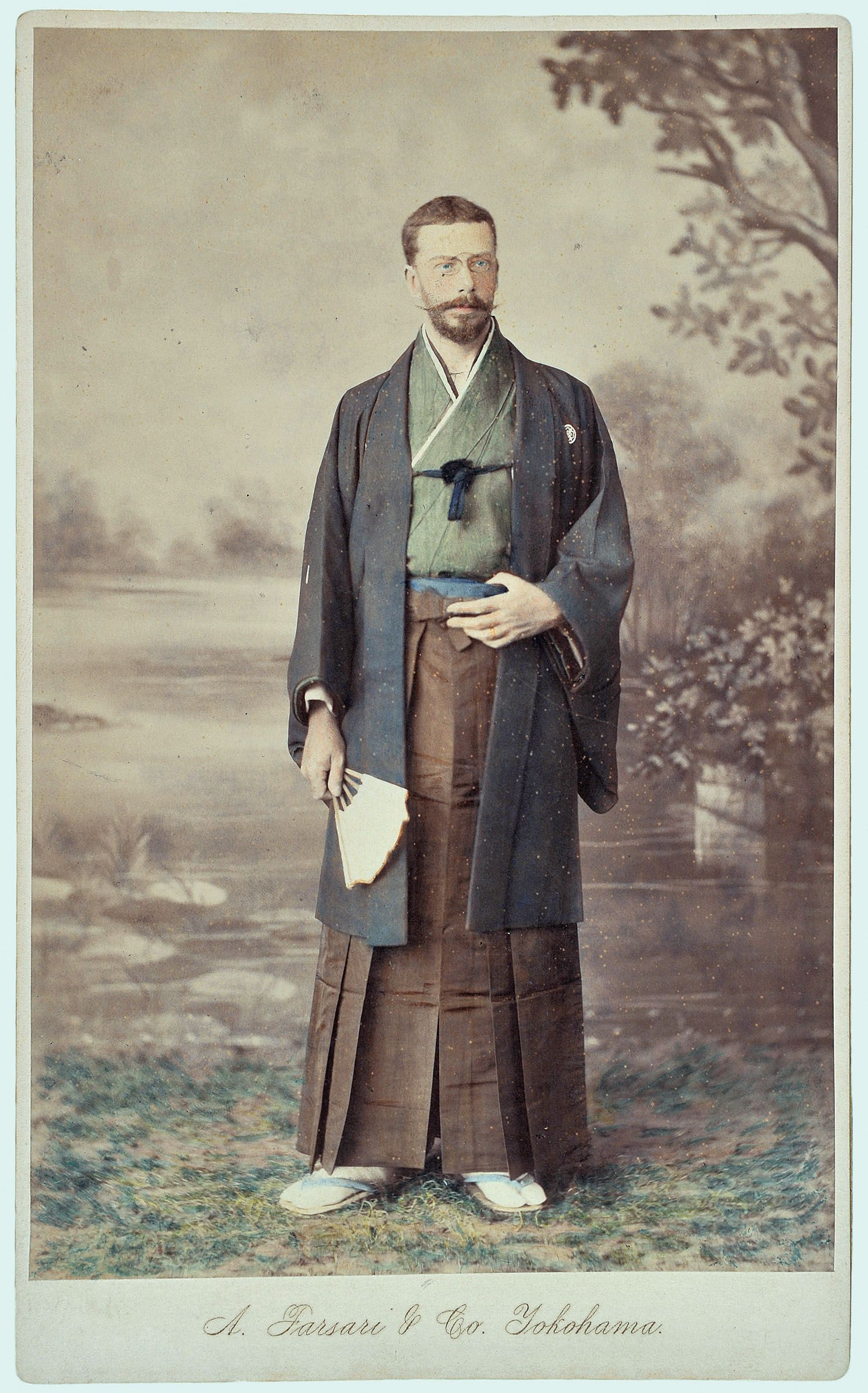
- Self-portrait
- Born: 11 February 1841; Vicenza, Austrian Empire
- Died: 7 February 1898 (age 56); Vicenza, Kingdom of Italy
- Occupation: Photographer

Adolfo Farsari (Italian: [aˈdolfo farˈsaːri]; 11 February 1841 – 7 February 1898) was an Italian photographer based in Yokohama, Japan. His studio, the last notable foreign-owned studio in Japan, was one of the country's largest and most prolific commercial photographic firms. Largely due to Farsari's exacting technical standards and his entrepreneurial abilities, it had a significant influence on the development of photography in Japan.

Following a brief military career, including service in the American Civil War, he became a successful entrepreneur and commercial photographer. His photographic work was highly regarded, particularly his hand-coloured portraits and landscapes, which he sold mostly to foreign residents and visitors to the country.

Farsari's images were widely distributed, presented or mentioned in books and periodicals, and sometimes recreated by artists in other media; they shaped foreign perceptions of the people and places of Japan, and to some degree affected how the Japanese saw themselves and their country.

== Early years ==
Adolfo Farsari was born in Vicenza, Lombardy–Venetia (then part of the Austrian Empire, now in Italy). He began a career in the Italian military in 1859 but emigrated to the United States in 1863. A fervent abolitionist, Farsari served with the Union Army as a New York State Volunteer Cavalry trooper until the end of the American Civil War. He married an American, but the marriage failed and in 1873 he left his wife and two children and moved to Japan.

Based in Yokohama, Farsari formed a partnership with E. A. Sargent. Their firm, Sargent, Farsari & Co., dealt in smokers' supplies, stationery, visiting cards, newspapers, magazines and novels, Japanese and English conversation books, dictionaries, guidebooks, maps, and photographic views of Japan. The creator of these photographs remains unknown, but Farsari was the maker of at least some of the maps, notably of Miyanoshita (in the Hakone resort area) and Yokohama. After his partnership with Sargent ended, the company, now A. Farsari & Co., published successive editions of Keeling's Guide to Japan, and Farsari himself wrote and published Japanese Words and Phrases for the Use of Strangers. The firm was among the most prolific publishers of materials to aid travellers, having produced its first guidebook to Japan by July 1880.

== Photographic career and studio ==
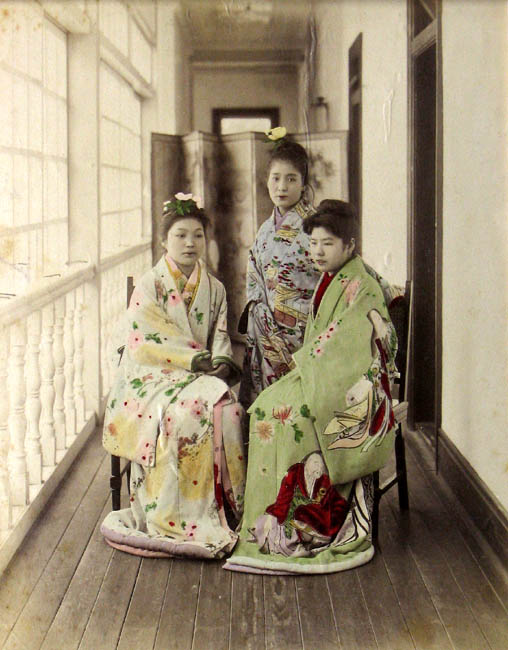
Three yūjo (courtesans) posing on an engawa, c. 1885. Hand-coloured albumen silver print

Farsari expanded his business interests into commercial photography and taught himself photography in 1883. In 1885 he formed a partnership with photographer Tamamura Kozaburō to acquire the Stillfried & Andersen studio (also known as the Japan Photographic Association), which had some 15 Japanese employees. The studio's stock included images by Felice Beato that it had acquired along with Beato's studio in 1877. It is not clear how long the partnership of Tamamura and Farsari lasted, for within a few years they were in competition with each other. Farsari further expanded his business in 1885, when the Yokohama Photographic Company (owned by David Welsh) folded and Farsari acquired its premises (next door to his own) and moved in. In addition to his Yokohama studio, Farsari likely had agents in Kobe and Nagasaki. By the end of 1886, Farsari and Chinese photographer Tong Cheong were the only foreign commercial photographers still operating in Japan, and by the following year, even Tong Cheong had gone.

In February 1886, a fire destroyed all of Farsari's negatives, and he then toured Japan for five months, taking new photographs to replace them. He reopened his studio in 1887. Despite his losses in the fire, by 1889 Farsari's stock comprised about 1,000 Japanese landscapes and genre portraits.

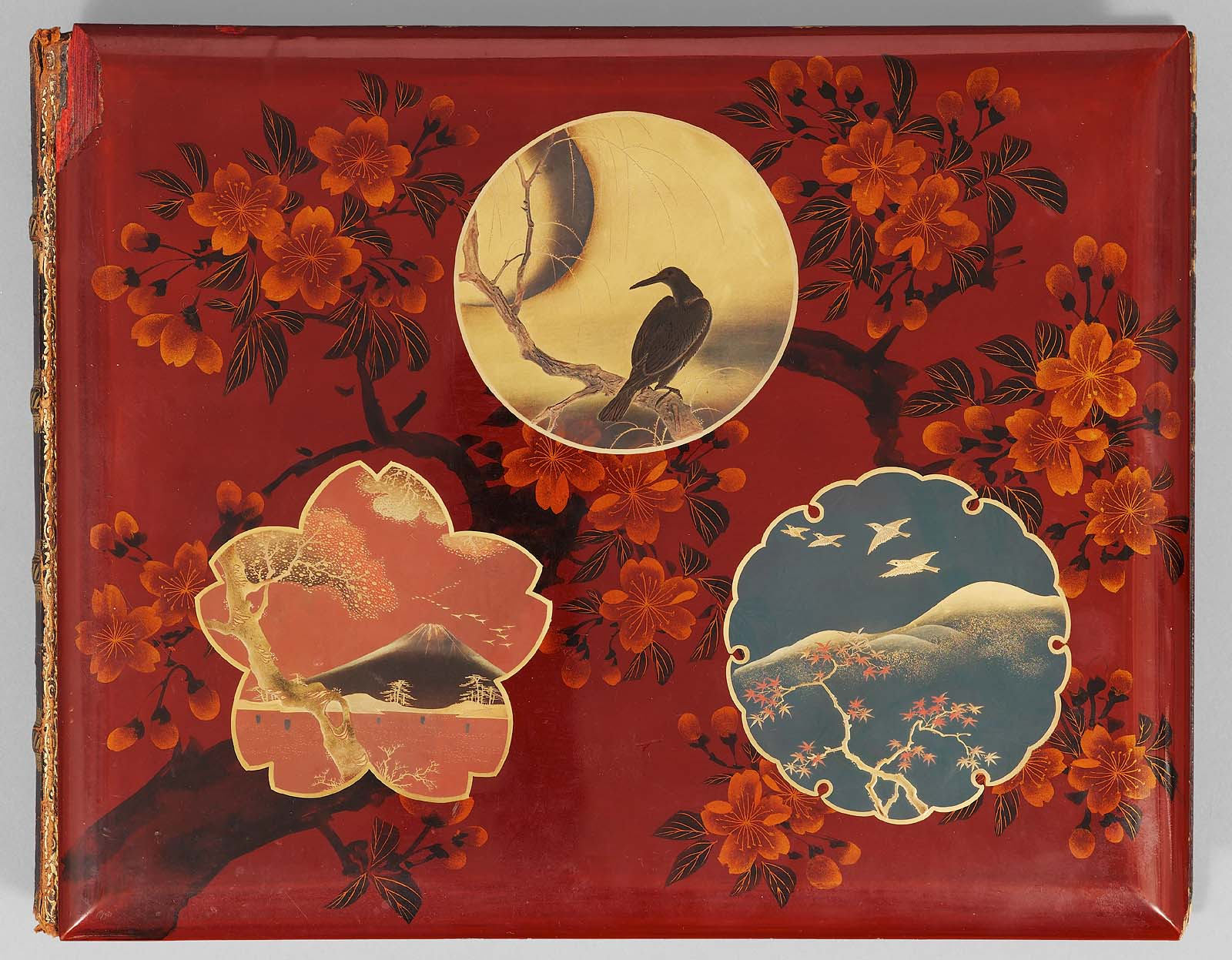
Lacquered album cover by A. Farsari & Co., c. 1890

Following the innovations of Felice Beato and Baron Raimund von Stillfried, Farsari further developed the trade in photograph albums. His studio generally produced sepia monochrome albumen prints that were hand-coloured and mounted on album leaves. These pages were often hand decorated and bound between covers of silk brocade or lacquer boards inlaid with ivory, mother-of-pearl and gold. Like his contemporaries, Farsari usually captioned and numbered his photographs in the images, often in white lettering on a black background.

Farsari sold many of these photograph albums, particularly to foreign residents and visitors. He employed excellent artists who each produced high-quality work at a pace of two or three hand-coloured prints per day. Farsari ensured that the colours were true to life and that the best materials were used. Accordingly, his work was expensive yet popular and often praised by clients and visitors to Japan, even receiving a glowing reference from Rudyard Kipling following his 1889 visit to Yokohama. That same year, Farsari presented a deluxe photograph album to the King of Italy. By the 1890s, the studio's high reputation had earned it exclusive rights to photograph the Imperial Gardens in Tokyo.

Prospective colourists at A. Farsari & Co. were interviewed by Farsari himself, who ensured they were familiar with Japanese painting techniques. Once hired, they were given unpaid instruction for several months, and then a basic salary that steadily increased as Farsari became satisfied with their work. A capable and loyal colourist could earn twice the rate offered at other Yokohama studios and double his own daily rate for work on Sundays. Colourists also received regular bonuses and gifts. On the other hand, Farsari complained in a letter to his sister that, to motivate his employees, he had to rage, swear and beat them, which he did according to a fixed schedule. By 1891 A. Farsari & Co. had 32 employees, 19 of whom were hand-colouring artists.

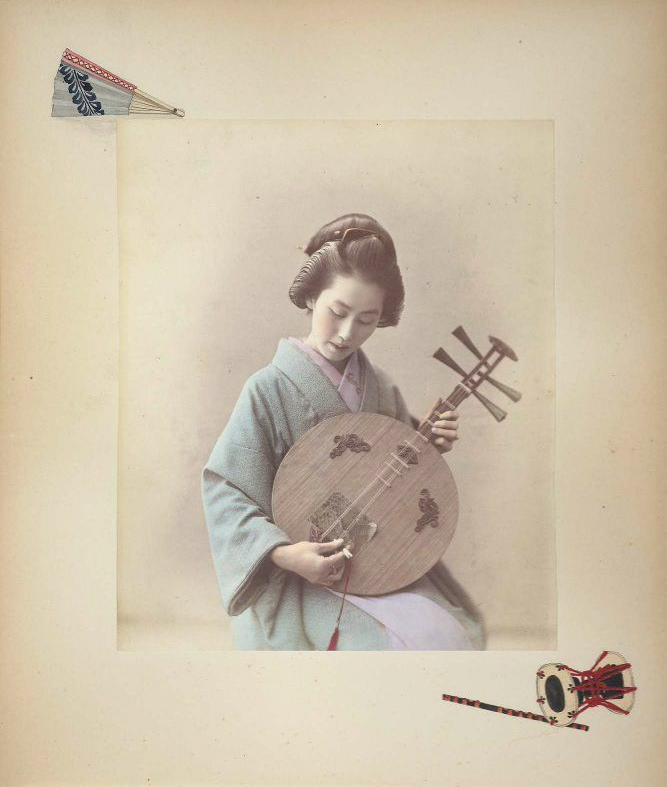
Woman playing a gekkin, c. 1886. Hand-coloured albumen print on a decorated album page

In 1885 Farsari had a daughter, Kiku, by a Japanese woman whom he may not have married. He described himself as living like a misanthrope, associating with very few people outside of business, and his correspondence indicates that he increasingly hoped to return to Italy. He tried to regain the Italian citizenship lost when he emigrated to the United States, and he even hoped to be made a cavaliere and thereby join the Italian aristocracy. His success in these endeavours is not clear. Nevertheless, in April 1890 he and his daughter left Japan for Italy. On 7 February 1898 Farsari died in his family home in Vicenza, four days before his 57th birthday.

Following Farsari's departure from Japan in 1890, his studio continued to operate and even listed him as proprietor until 1901, when Tonokura Tsunetarō became the owner. Tonokura, whom Farsari had known since the mid-1870s, had long managed the day-to-day operations of the studio. In 1904 Tonokura left the business to start his own studio and another of Farsari's former employees, Watanabe Tokutarō, became the new owner, only to be succeeded by the former secretary, Fukagawa Itomaro. The business was finally registered as a Japanese company in 1906 and it continued to operate until at least 1917 and possibly as late as 1923, the year in which Yokohama was largely destroyed by the Great Kantō earthquake. A. Farsari & Co. was the last notable foreign-owned photographic studio to operate in Japan.

== Farsari and Yokohama shashin ==
Farsari expressed his view of photography in a letter to his sister, writing, "taking pictures is just a mechanical thing." In describing his development as a photographer, he wrote, "I have had no real teachers, I have learned everything from books. I bought all the necessary equipment and with no help from anyone, I printed, took photographs and so on. Then I taught others."

Farsari did not work in isolation. The works (particularly those that were hand-coloured) and practices of the many foreign and Japanese commercial photographers who operated in Yokohama from the 1860s to the 1880s have been termed Yokohama shashin (literally, "Yokohama photographs" or "photography"). Farsari and its other practitioners – notably Beato, Stillfried, Tamamura, Kusakabe Kimbei, Ogawa Kazumasa, and Uchida Kuichi – produced works that in their subject matter, composition and colouring present a striking combination of the conventions and techniques of Western photography with those of Japanese artistic traditions, particularly ukiyo-e. These photographers also provided the key images by which Meiji-era Japan and the Japanese were known to people in other countries. Their images also changed the ways in which Japanese saw their own country. Through their images, foreign photographers publicised sites that interested them, sometimes drawing Japanese attention to hitherto neglected locations. One was the now-important "Daibutsu" (great Buddha) at Kōtoku-in, Kamakura. In a similar vein, Farsari's and others' photographs of the mausoleums of Tōshō-gū made the once restricted site familiar to a wider audience.

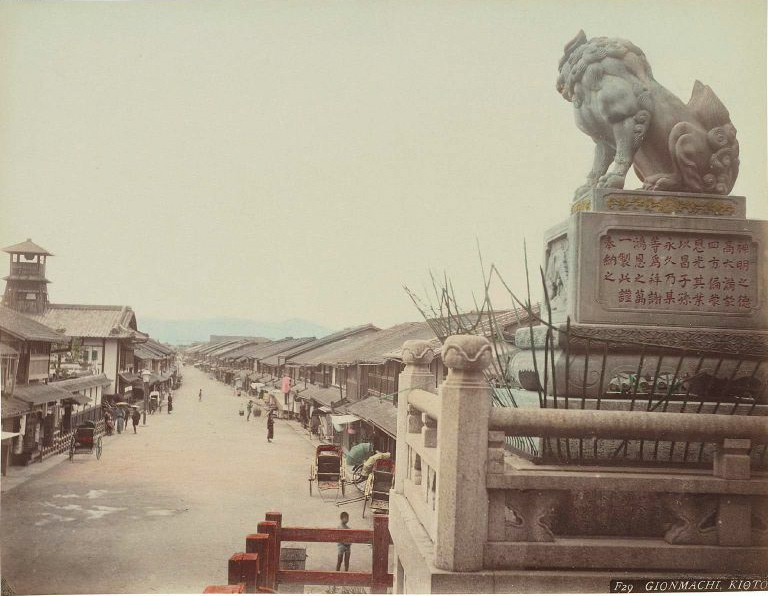
Gionmachi, Kioto, by Adolfo Farsari, c. 1886. Hand-coloured albumen print

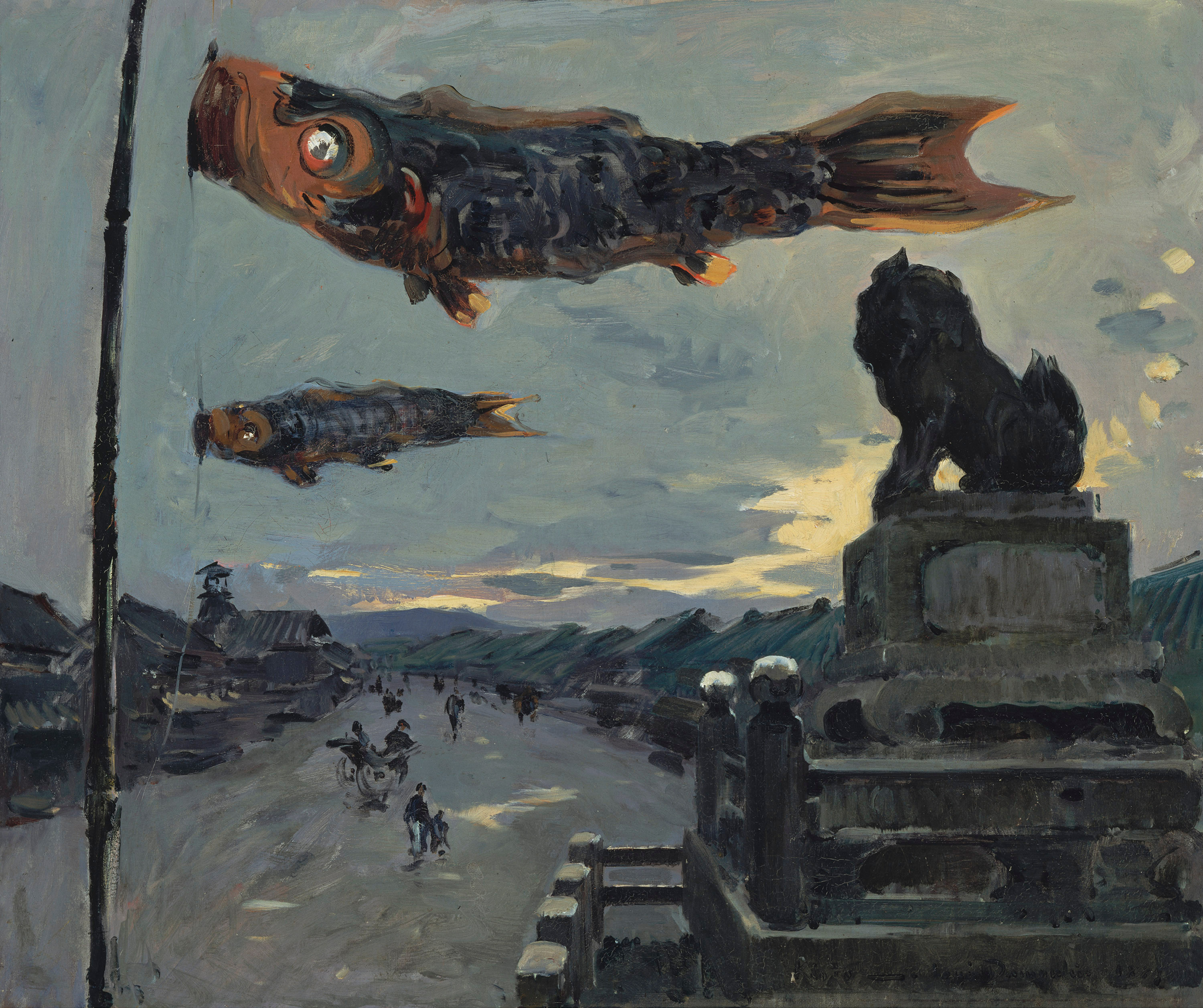
Boys' Festival from the Bluff, Yokohama, by Louis-Jules Dumoulin, 1888. Oil on canvas

Farsari and other 19th-century commercial photographers generally concentrated on two types of subject matter: the scenery of Japan and the "manners and customs" of its inhabitants. Such subjects, and the ways in which they were literally and figuratively framed, were chosen to appeal to foreign taste; the reason for this, apart from the photographer's individual aesthetics, vision and preconceptions, had much to do with economics. Photographs were expensive to make and accordingly expensive to buy. In 1870s Japan, a portrait photograph usually cost half a ryō "per head", about a month's pay for an artisan. Given such pricing, few Japanese could afford photographs and a photographer's clientele was largely drawn from the foreign residents of the European and American enclaves: colonial administrators, missionaries, merchants and the military. By the early 1870s, tourists had joined their number. To appeal to this clientele, photographers often staged and contrived the scenes they photographed, particularly the portraits depicting "manners and customs".

In 1885, Charles J. S. Makin used some of Farsari's views to illustrate his travel account Land of the Rising Sun, Being a Short Account of Japan and the Japanese. As photomechanical printing was still in its infancy, it was common for artists and illustrators to create works derived from photographs. For example, Charles Wirgman's numerous engravings for The Illustrated London News were made from views by Wirgman's friend and sometime partner Felice Beato. Occasionally the link between a work of art and its photographic source material was less overt: Louis-Jules Dumoulin's 1888 oil painting Boys' Festival from the Bluff, Yokohama [sic] (now called Carp Banners in Kyoto) draws heavily from Farsari's photograph Gionmachi, Kioto (now often called View of Shijō-dōri, Kyoto); although the painted image strongly resembles the photographic source, the location of the subject has been changed in the title.

During the era of the collodion process, before the arrival of less demanding photographic technology (the gelatin silver process, photographic film, and smaller cameras) and the consequent rise of amateur photography, commercial photographers like Farsari had a particular importance for recording events and views. In Japan before 1899 such photographers were even more significant because the government required foreigners to obtain passes to journey to the interior, and commercial photographers based in Japan could more easily gain access and provide rare images of restricted areas. By 1889, however, Farsari estimated that about half of all visitors to Yokohama were amateur photographers; even if this was an exaggeration, the presence of increasing numbers of amateur photographers was obviously affecting the commercial photography business. To encourage amateur photographers to visit his studio and possibly buy his merchandise, Farsari provided free use of a darkroom.

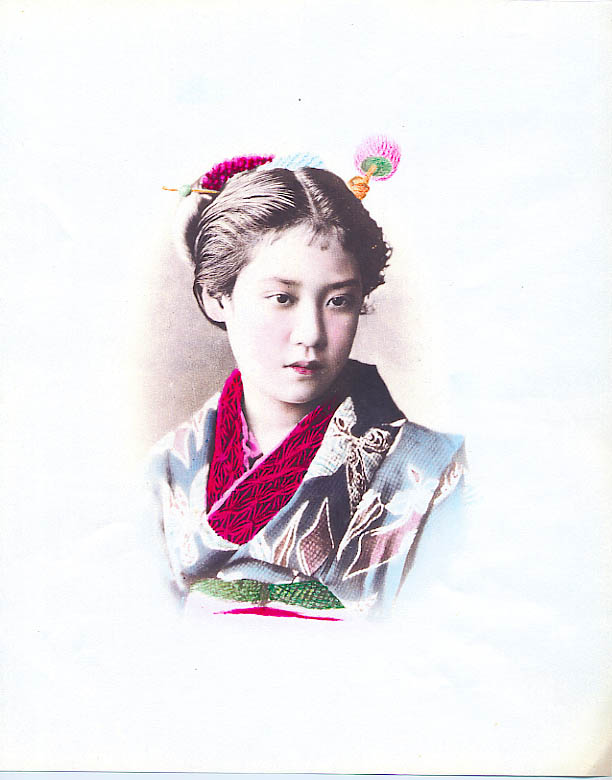
Officer's Daughter, 1880s. Hand-coloured albumen silver print

Attribution is often difficult with Farsari's photographs because 19th-century photographers frequently acquired each other's images and sold them under their own names. This may be due to the commonplace exchange of stock and negatives between various commercial photographers, or due to the number of freelance amateurs who sold their work to more than one studio. Thus a photograph identified as by Farsari might actually be by Beato, Stillfried & Andersen or Kusakabe. A case in point is the photograph of an Officer's Daughter, variously attributed to Farsari, Stillfried, Kusakabe or even Suzuki Shin'ichi.

The lifetime of A. Farsari & Co. spanned the transition of Japanese photography from the early involvement and influence of foreign photographers to the emergence of an independent, native Japanese photographic identity. Coming after the first generation of photographers, the firm made significant contributions to the development of commercial photography in Japan by emphasising the excellence of materials, refining the practice of presenting photographs in albums (which became art objects in themselves), and making effective use of Farsari's own tourist-oriented publications to promote his photographic studio's work – an early, minor example of vertical integration.

== Evaluations of his work ==
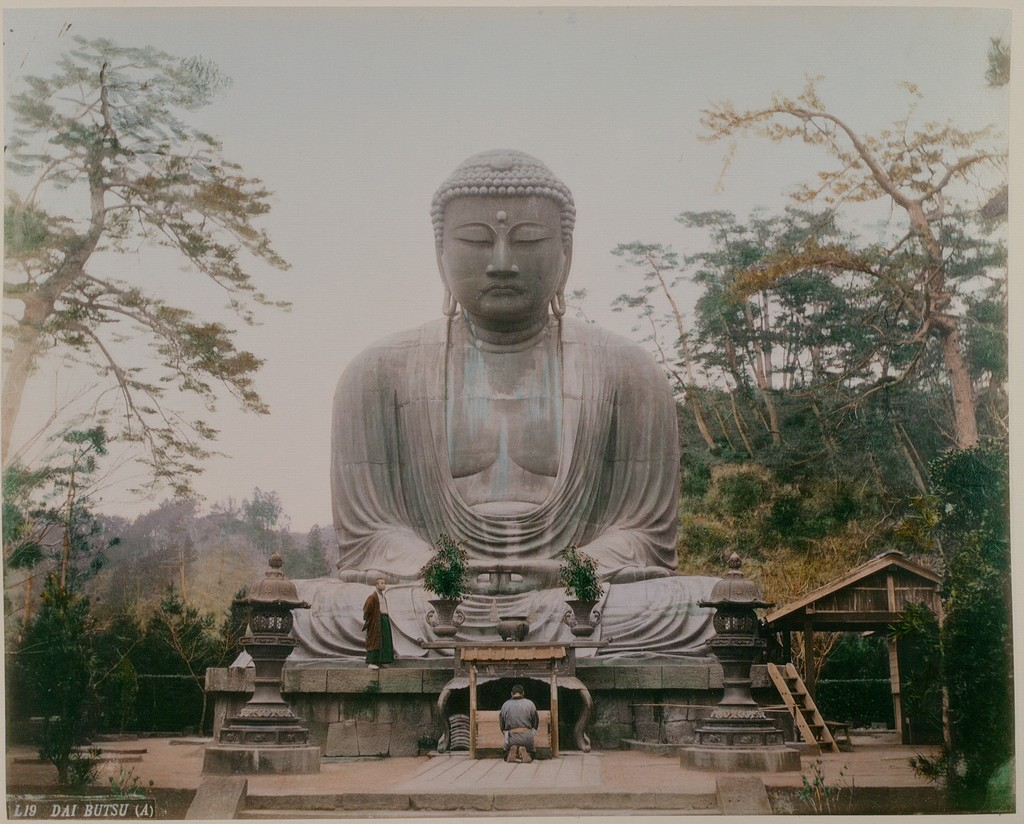
Dai Butsu, Kōtoku-in, Kamakura, Japan, between 1885 and 1890. Hand-coloured albumen silver print

In its time, the work of A. Farsari & Co. was highly regarded and popular. Besides Kipling's endorsement, photographer and prolific photography writer W. K. Burton published an appraisal in an 1887 article: "I have seen no better work in the way of coloured photographs anywhere than some of Farsari's productions". In the same year, an admiring review of Farsari's work appeared in the journal Photographic Times and American Photographer, describing it as "technically almost perfect" and showing "artistic proportion" in the selection of subjects, depicting Japanese life and providing images of the natural beauty of a country that was admittedly unfamiliar to Americans.

Later opinions have been divided. In a 1988 article, art and photography historian Ellen Handy described A. Farsari & Co. as having become "well-known for issuing albums of landscape views in great quantity, but without regard for print quality and delicacy of hand-colouring". Terry Bennett, a specialist in the early photography of Asia, refers to Farsari's work as "inconsistent and lacking the quality found in the photography of Beato, Stillfried or Kusakabe." However, Bennett also notes that Farsari employed excellent artists, used the best paper and produced some "stunningly coloured photographs". For historian Sebastian Dobson, the artistic and historical significance of the work of Farsari (and other Yokohama photographers of his era, particularly Kusakabe and Tamamura) is rightly undergoing re-evaluation after many years in which it was dismissed as tourist kitsch and "perceived by some as pandering to nineteenth-century Western notions of exoticism". Farsari's photographs and albums are included in numerous museums and private collections around the world, and a selection of his works was exhibited at the Museum of Fine Arts, Boston in 2004.

== Selected photographs and other items ==
Photographs are indicated by Farsari's titles, followed by the date of exposure, the photographic process, and a descriptive title.

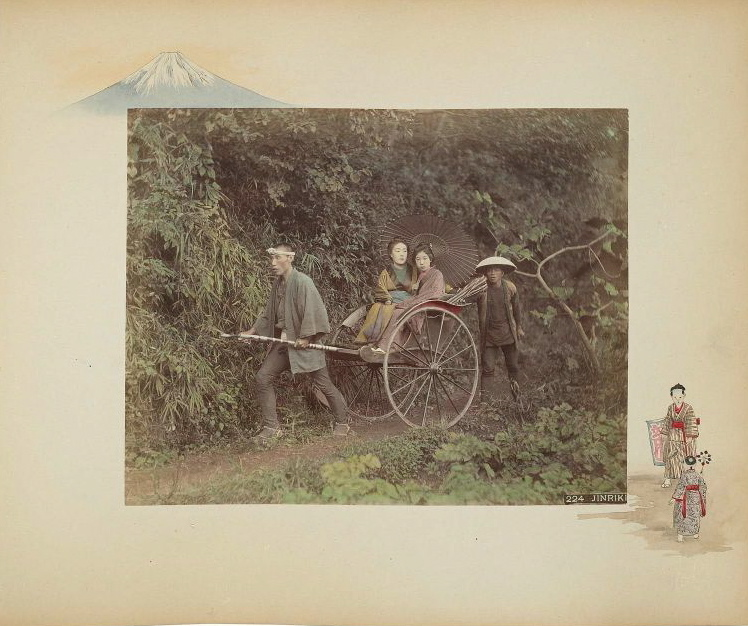
Jinriki, 1886. Hand-coloured albumen print on a decorated album page. A rickshaw driver, two passengers and a bearer

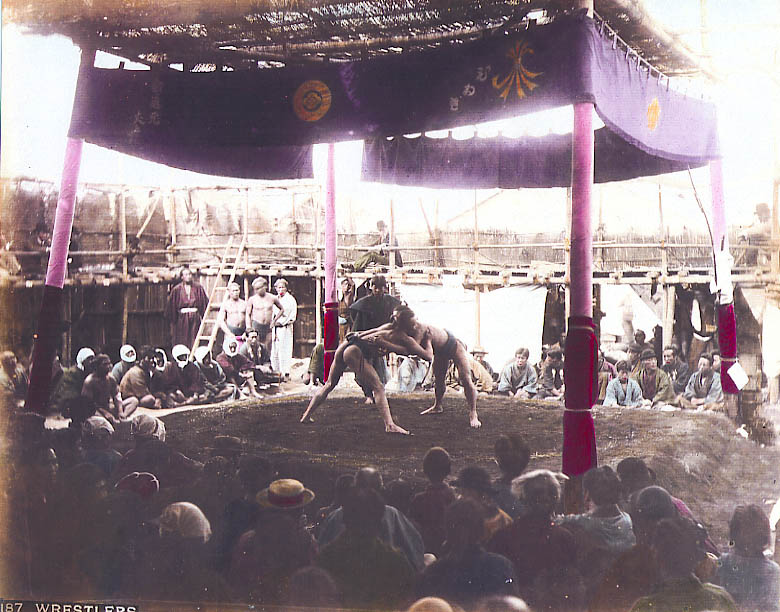
Wrestlers, c. 1886. Hand-coloured albumen print. View of a sumo match showing rikishi [wrestlers], a gyōji [referee] and an audience

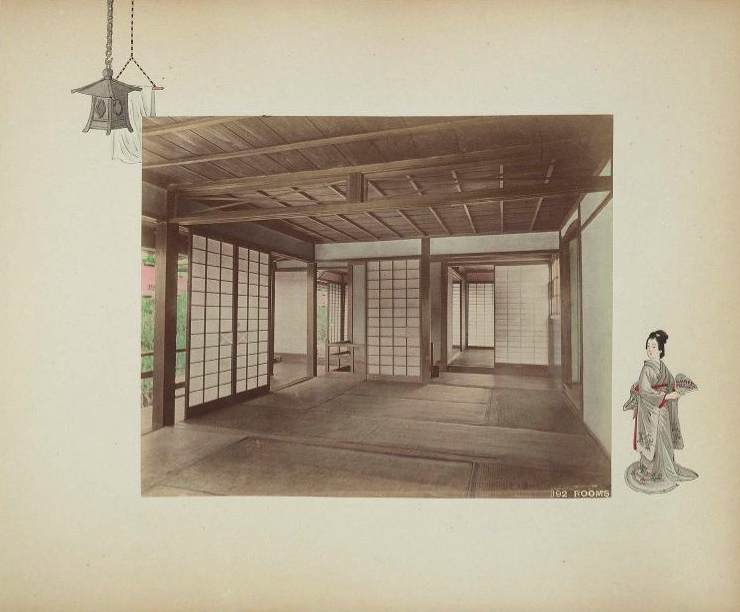
Rooms, 1886. Hand-coloured albumen print on a decorated album page. Interior of a house, Japan

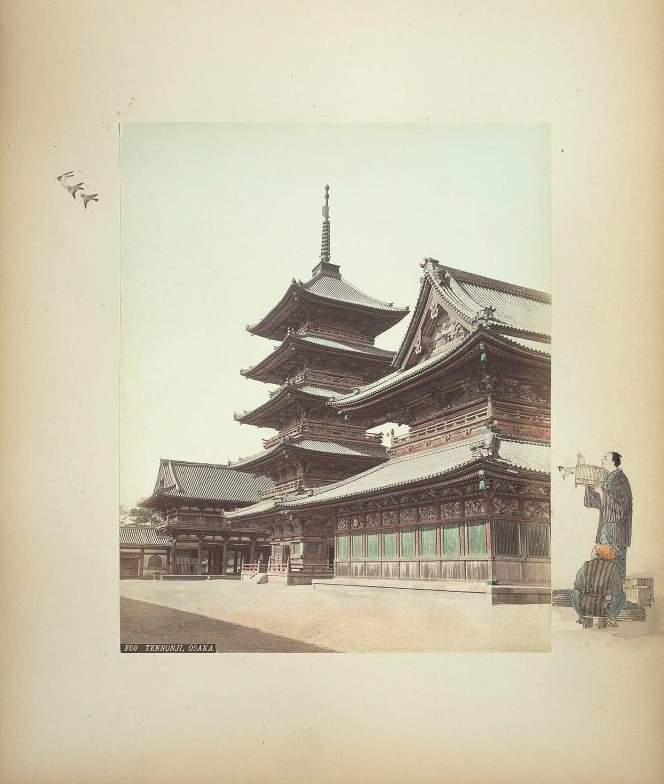
Tennonji, Osaka, between 1885 and 1890. Hand-coloured albumen print on a decorated album page. View of Shitennō-ji, Osaka

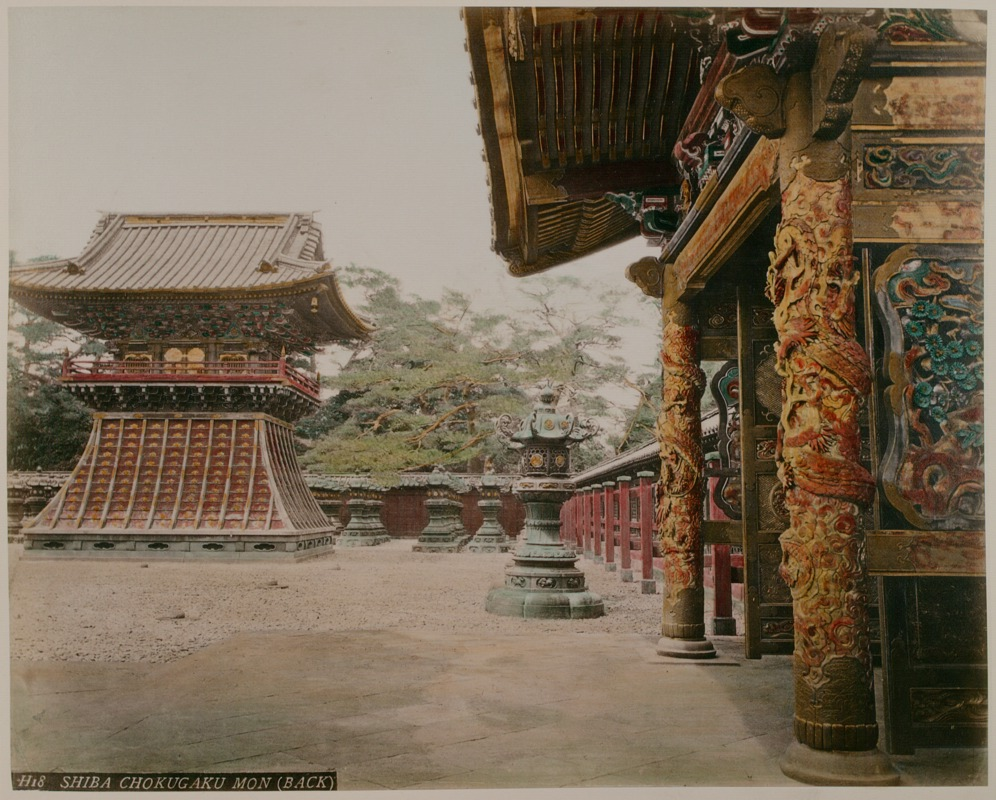
Shiba Chokugaku Mon (back), between 1885 and 1890. Hand-coloured albumen print. View of the Yūshō-in Mausoleum complex showing the bell tower and Chokugaku gate, Zōjō-ji, Tokyo

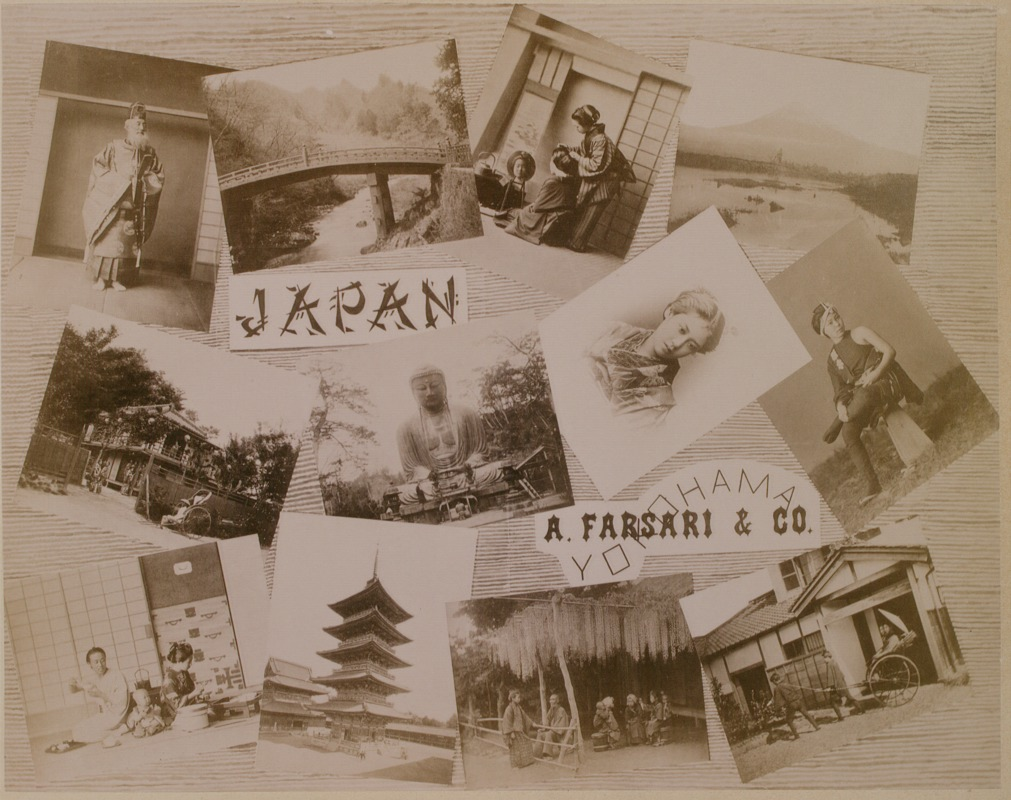
Japan, between 1885 and 1890. Albumen print. Photomontage incorporating various images by A. Farsari & Co.

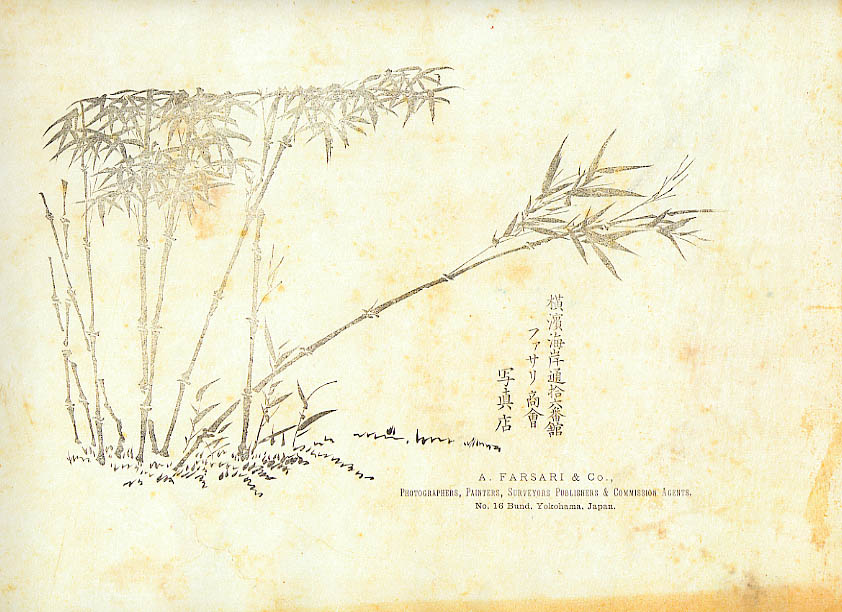
A. Farsari & Co., c. 1890. Title page from a photograph album by A. Farsari & Co.

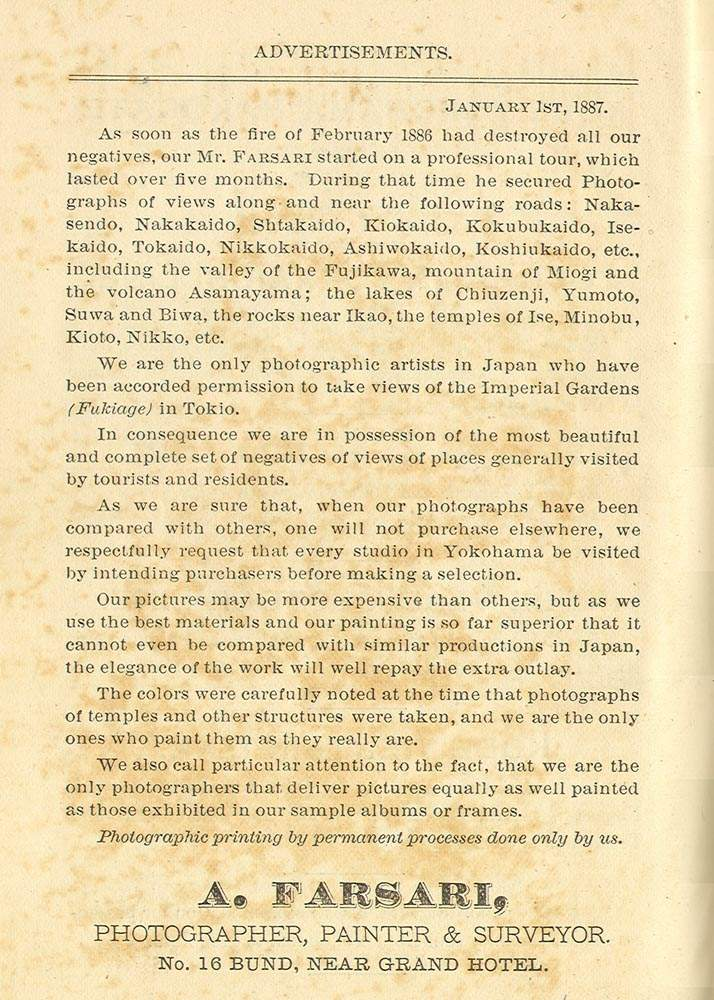
Advertisement for A. Farsari & Co., 1887. In Keeling's Guide to Japan, 4th Edition, 2nd Issue, 1890

== See also ==
- Baron Raimund von Stillfried, an Austrian photographer working in Yokohama during the same period
