= Keeling's Guide to Japan =

Japanese tourist guidebook

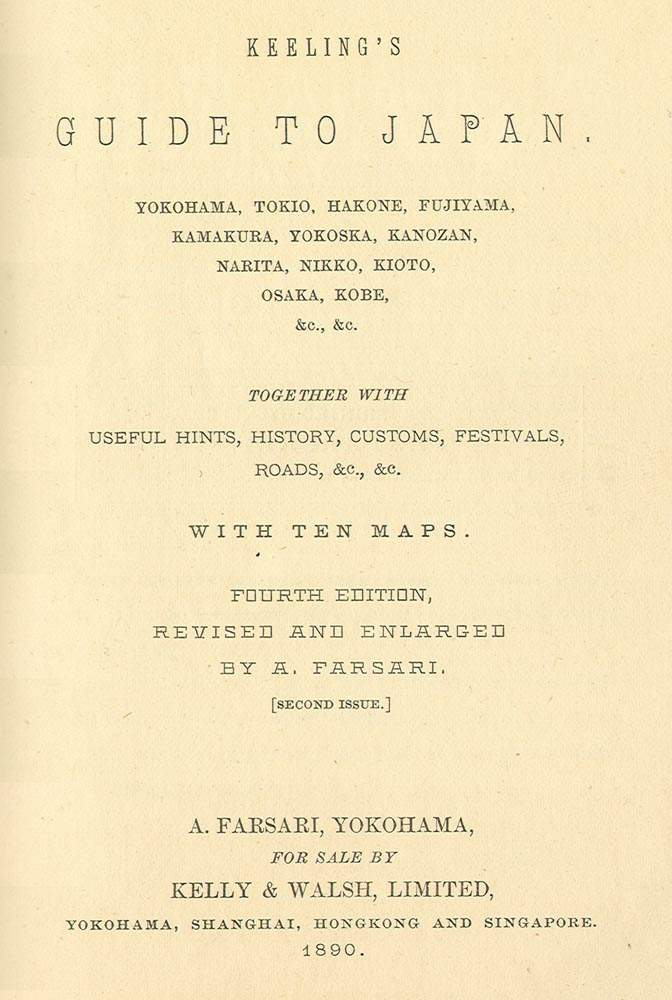
- Title page of Keeling's Guide to Japan, 1890
- Subject: Geography and tourism

Keeling's Guide to Japan was a tourist guidebook published in several editions during the 19th century by the Yokohama-based firm, A. Farsari & Co.

The full title is Keeling's Guide to Japan: Yokohama, Tokio, Hakone, Fujiyama, Kamakura, Yokoska, Kanozan, Narita, Nikko, Kioto, Osaka, Kobe, Etc. Etc.

The guidebook provided accurate and detailed maps and plans of Japanese cities, resort areas, and building complexes; descriptions of sites, services and suggested itineraries; numerous informative tables; and pages of advertisements (including one for the Farsari photographic studio). Given the degree of detail, the guide is useful even today as a resource for a better understanding of Japan in the second half of the 19th century.
