= Requiem Survey (website) =

Music list website

- Website type: Online encyclopedia
- Available in: English
- Country of origin: Netherlands
- Owner: Kees van der Vloed
- Creator: Kees van der Vloed
- Website: requiemsurvey.org
- Launched: 2003; 23 years ago
- Current status: Active

Requiem Survey, a website established in 2003 by Reformed Christian rector, literary scholar and author Kees van der Vloed (born 9 June 1960 in the Netherlands), endeavors to categorize all composers and works relating to the Mass for the dead. As of 2023 the repository includes 3,545 composers and 5,701 works. The specialized encyclopedia also lists Vloed's personal music library, which is "focused on work directly related to the Latin text and its implementation excluding evocative work, but as promiscuous as Henze’s Requiem (a cycle of nine sacred concerts), Hindemith (on texts by Whitman) and Weinberg (on texts by various poets, e.g., Lorca and Fukagawa)."

The alphabetical survey itself recognizes classical, vocal requiems and their composers, including fragments and unfinished works in the original Latin text as well as in other languages (e.g., German requiems), requiem-songs, motets and profane requiems. Instrumental works are not included.

== Size, readership and site traffic ==
Since its inception, Requiem Survey has received an audience of more than 170 million readers.
