= Enami =

Enami or ENAMI may refer to:

== People ==
- Kyoko Enami (江波 杏子; 1942–2018), Japanese film and television actress
- T. Enami (江南 信國; 1859–1929), Japanese photographer

== Companies ==
- ENAMI (Chile), Empresa Nacional de Minería, state-owned company established in 1960
- ENAMI (Ecuador), Empresa Nacional Minera, state-owned company established in 2010

== Other uses ==
- Kiyose Enami, a character in the manga series Slow Start (manga)
