= Guoyao Wu =

Chinese-American animal scientist

Guoyao Wu is a Chinese-American animal scientist. He is a Distinguished Professor of Animal Science at Texas A&M University and a fellow of the American Association for the Advancement of Science (AAAS).

== Biography ==
Wu received an undergraduate degree in Animal Science from South China Agricultural University, then a master's degree in Animal Nutrition from China Agricultural University (formerly Beijing Agricultural University). He earned both master's and Ph.D. degrees in Animal Biochemistry from The University of Alberta (Edmonton, Alberta, Canada). He completed postdoctoral research in Nutrition and Metabolism (Diabetes and Obesity) at McGill University Faculty of Medicine and in Biochemistry at Memorial University of Newfoundland Faculty of Medicine in Canada. Wu is a University Distinguished Professor of Animal Science at Texas A&M University. He is also affiliated with the university's Mentored Research Program in Space Life Sciences, where he examines nutrition issues related to space travel and skeletal muscle metabolism.

Much of Wu's research has focused on amino acid biochemistry and nutrition in animals, including the arginine-nitric oxide pathway, as well as the synthesis of the arginine-family of amino acids (including arginine, citrulline, glutamate, glutamine, and proline) and glycine in mammals, birds and fish. Notably, he discovered the glutamine-glutamate cycle in skeletal muscle, the arginine-citrulline cycle in macrophages, and the urea cycle in mammalian (e.g., pig) enterocytes; the synthesis of citrulline and arginine from glutamine and proline in mammalian (e.g., pig) enterocytes; the synthesis of polyamines from proline in mammalian enterocytes and placentae (e.g., pig) as well as avian kidneys; the synthesis of glycine from 4-hydroxyproline in diverse tissues (including liver, kidneys and skeletal muscle) of mammalian (e.g., pig) neonates to compensate for a severe deficiency of glycine in milk; important roles for dietary arginine, glutamine and glycine in improving the survival, growth and health of low-birth-weight pigs; and no or limited catabolism of extracellular citrulline or glutamate by ruminal microbes due to no or limited uptake. In addition, Wu is credited for proposing two seminal concepts in nutrition: functional amino acids and dietary requirements of animals for traditionally classified "nonessential" amino acids. His work has transformed the feeding of livestock, poultry, and aquatic animals worldwide, and also has important implications for human nutrition and health.

In 2012, Wu was elected Fellow of the AAAS. He is listed among the Thomson Reuters Highly Cited Researchers. His papers (including 786 articles in peer-reviewed journals and 99 chapters in books) have been extensively cited in Google Scholar over 103,500 times with an H-index of 153 in Google Scholar. Four of his journal articles have each been cited over 3,500 times (ranging from 3,521 to 4,726 times), and seven of his other journal papers have each been cited over 1,000 times (ranging from 1,093 to 2,531 times). Thus, he has been recognized as a Most Cited Author and a Most Influential Scientific Mind in the Web of Science and among the 10 most cited scientists in the field of agricultural sciences worldwide. Dr. Wu was ranked No. 1 worldwide in animal and veterinary sciences by Research.com (2025).

In addition to his original research papers, Wu has published two popular text/reference books: Amino Acids: Biochemistry and Nutrition (CRC Press, 2013 and 2022) and Principles of Animal Nutrition (CRC Press, 2018 and 2025).s Wu has also contributed articles on amino acid nutrition and metabolism to The Encyclopedia of Animal Science, The Encyclopedia of Animal Nutrition, The Encyclopedia of Human Nutrition, and Modern Human Nutrition. Furthermore, he has edited 8 books related to animal agriculture, animal protein nutrition, amino acid nutrition and metabolism, cat and dog nutrition and metabolism, and general animal nutrition.

Wu has received many awards from his professional societies, including the Established Investigator award from the American Heart Association (1998); the AFIA Nonruminant Nutrition Research Award from the American Society of Animal Science (ASAS, 2004); the FASS-AFIA New Frontiers in Animal Nutrition Award from the Federation of Animal Science Societies (2008); the Morrison award (the highest award from the ASAS) in 2018, and the Top Agri-Food Pioneer Award from the World Food Prize Foundation in 2024. He has served on the Editorial Advisory Boards of The Biochemical Journal, The Journal of Nutrition, and Journal of Animal Science and Biotechnology. Wu has also served as an Editor of Amino Acids, SpringerPlus: Amino Acids Collection, Frontiers in Bioscience, Advances in Experimental Medicine and Biology (five volumes on amino acid nutrition and metabolism in animals), The Encyclopedia of Animal Nutrition, and the Journal of Nutritional Biochemistry.
