= Op. 96 =

In music, Op. 96 stands for Opus number 96. Compositions that are assigned this number include:

- Beethoven – Violin Sonata No. 10
- Dvořák – String Quartet No. 12
- Raff – Symphony No. 1
- Schumann – Lieder und Gesänge volume IV
- Shostakovich – Festive Overture
- Weinberg – Requiem
