= Fukagawa =

Fukagawa may refer to:

- Fukagawa, Hokkaido, a city
  - Fukagawa Station, a railway station
- Fukagawa, Tokyo, a region in Kōtō, Tokyo, formerly Fukagawa ward of Tokyo City
- Fukagawa (surname), a Japanese surname
