= Tonokura Tsunetarō =

Japanese photographer

Tonokura Tsunetarō (殿倉常太郎, Tonokura Tsunetarō) was the owner of the A. Farsari & Co. photographic studio, based in Yokohama, Japan. Tonokura, who had known the firm's founder Adolfo Farsari since the 1870s, managed the firm's day-to-day affairs until he became its owner in 1901. He left the company in 1904 to start his own studio.
