= Requiem (Weinberg) =

Requiem by Mieczyslaw Weinberg

Mieczysław Weinberg composed his Requiem, Op. 96, between 1965 and 1967. Like other Soviet Requiem compositions such as Dmitri Kabalevsky's, it does not set to music the Roman Rite liturgy, but secular poems by Mikhail Dudin, Munetoshi Fukugawa, Federico García Lorca, Dmitri Kedrin and Sara Teasdale. The use of anti-war texts links this work to Benjamin Britten's War Requiem, which Weinberg knew well.

It consists of the following movements:

1. Bread and Iron (1. Хлеб и железо Dmitri Kedrin)
2. And Then... (2. И затем … Federico García Lorca
3. There will Come Soft Rains (3. Будет ласковый дождь Sara Teasdale)
4. Hiroshima Five-Line Stanzas (4. Хиросимское пятистишие Munetoshi Fukugawa; revision of Weinberg's cantata op. 92 Hiroshima)
5. People Walked... (5. Люди шли Federico García Lorca)
6. Sow the Seed (6. Посейте семя Mikhail Dudin)

It was not performed in the composer's lifetime, the premiere only taking place on 21 November 2009 in Liverpool by the Royal Liverpool Philharmonic Orchestra and Chorus, with Thomas Sanderling conducting.

The Requiem was published by Peermusic's Hamburg branch in 2007. Their description page (and the NUKAT description) note that the work requires soprano, children's chorus, mixed chorus, and full orchestra.

== Lyrics ==
The score is headed by an excerpt of a short poem by Aleksandr Tvardovsky:

The gun-barrels are still warm,
And the sand has not yet absorbed the blood.
But peace has come. Breathe people,
For the threshold of war has been crossed...
