= T. Enami =

Japanese photographer (1859–1929)

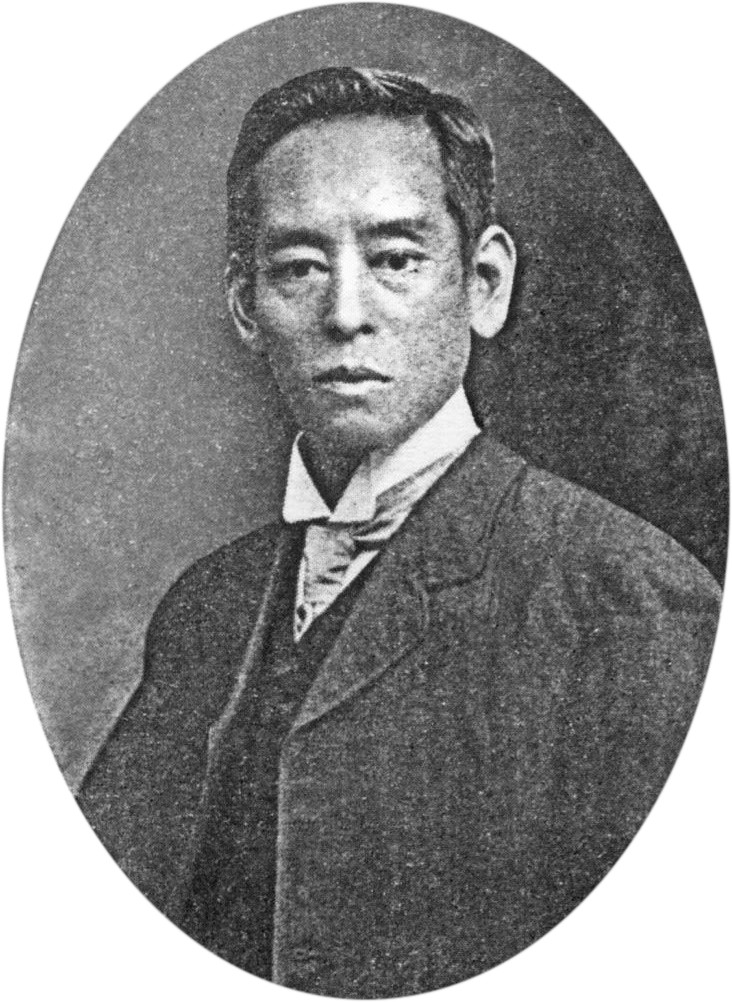
T. Enami, circa 1909

T. Enami was the trade name of Enami Nobukuni (江南 信國; 1859–1929), a Meiji period Japanese photographer. The T. of his trade name is thought to have stood for Toshi, though he never spelled it out on any personal or business document.

== Biography ==
Born in Edo (now Tokyo) during the Bakumatsu era, Enami was first a student of, and then an assistant to the well known photographer and collotypist, Ogawa Kazumasa. Enami relocated to Yokohama, and opened a studio on Benten-dōri (Benten Street) in 1892. Just a few doors away from him was the studio of the already well known Tamamura Kōzaburō. He and Enami would work together on at least three related projects over the years.

Enami became unique as the only photographer of that period known to work in all popular formats, including the production of large-format photographs compiled into what are commonly called "Yokohama Albums". Enami went on to become Japan's most prolific photographer of small-format images such as the stereoview and glass lantern-slides, some of which were hand-tinted. His images in all formats eventually appeared in books and periodicals having press-runs in the millions. The Japanese stereoview lines of at least three major American publishers were made up entirely of T. Enami images.

Enami survived the 1923 Great Kantō earthquake, and rebuilt his studio which had been destroyed by the quake and subsequent fire. After his death at age 70 in 1929, his first son Tamotsu took over the studio until it was once again destroyed in 1945 by the Allied bombing of Yokohama during World War II.

== Legacy ==
Because Tamotsu shared the initial "T" with his father, photo-historians later confused attribution of the father's photographs with those produced by his son. Terry Bennett, in his book Photography in Japan 1853–1912 offered interesting commentary concerning the "father or son" attribution problem. The Enami family in Yokohama later resolved the mystery: Tamotsu was not a photographer, and T. Enami never stood for Tamotsu Enami. Rather, the son maintained the studio, and continued the production and sale of his father's old photographs. Fortunately, due to sharing the same first-name initial with his father, he didn't have to change the letterheads or labels of the company ephemera. These revelations, and other biographical data appeared in an essay and stereoview index entry written by Okinawa-based photo researcher Rob Oechsle, and published in Bennett's follow-up volume, Old Japanese Photographs – Collectors' Data Guide.

Philbert Ono of PhotoGuide Japan has also speculated on the possibility that T. Enami intentionally named his son with a leading T in the hope that he would someday take over the studio.

Perhaps the greatest posthumous honor conferred on Enami was the selection of one of his images to be the sole inset-photograph appearing on the first-edition cover of the monumental Odyssey, The Art of Photography at National Geographic. Early in their history, Enami had been a contributing photographer to the magazine.

== Photographs by T. Enami ==
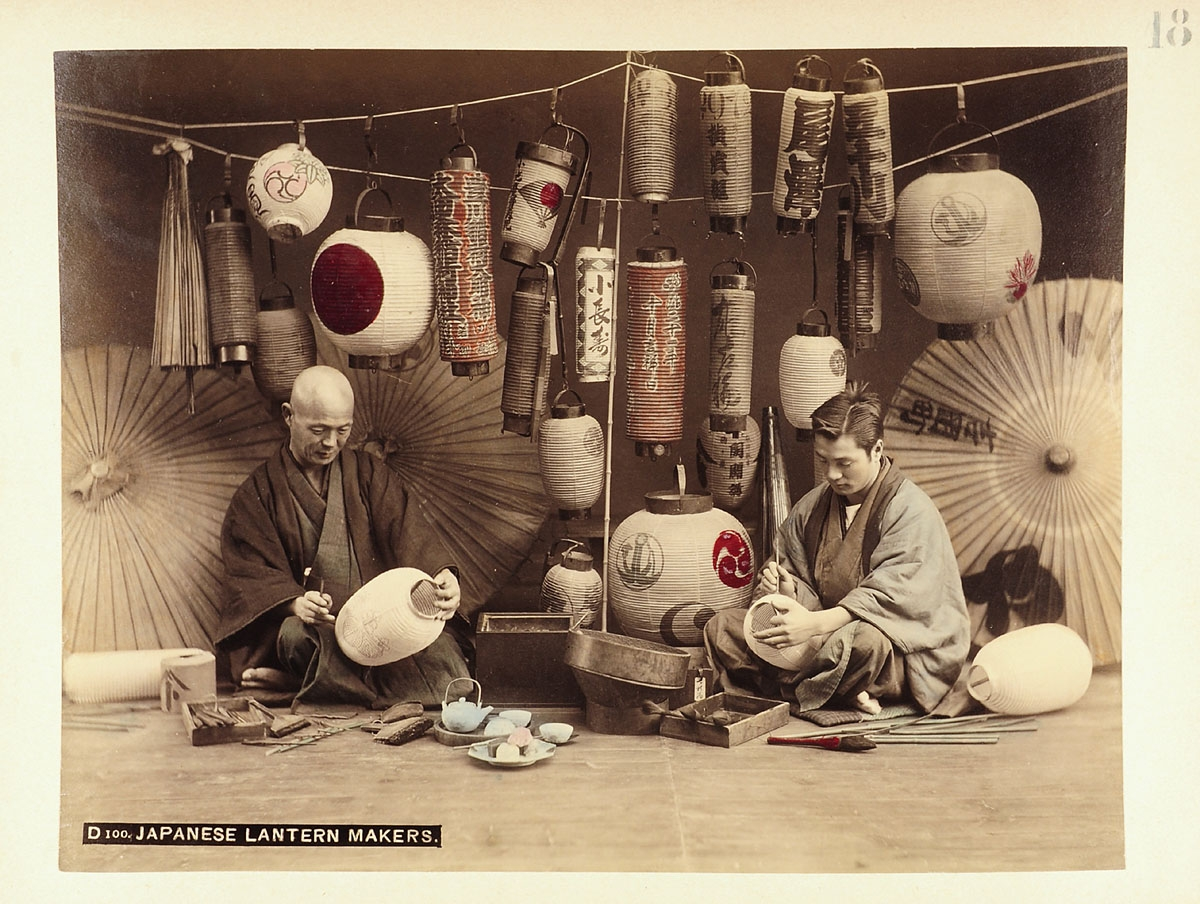
Japanese Lantern Makers

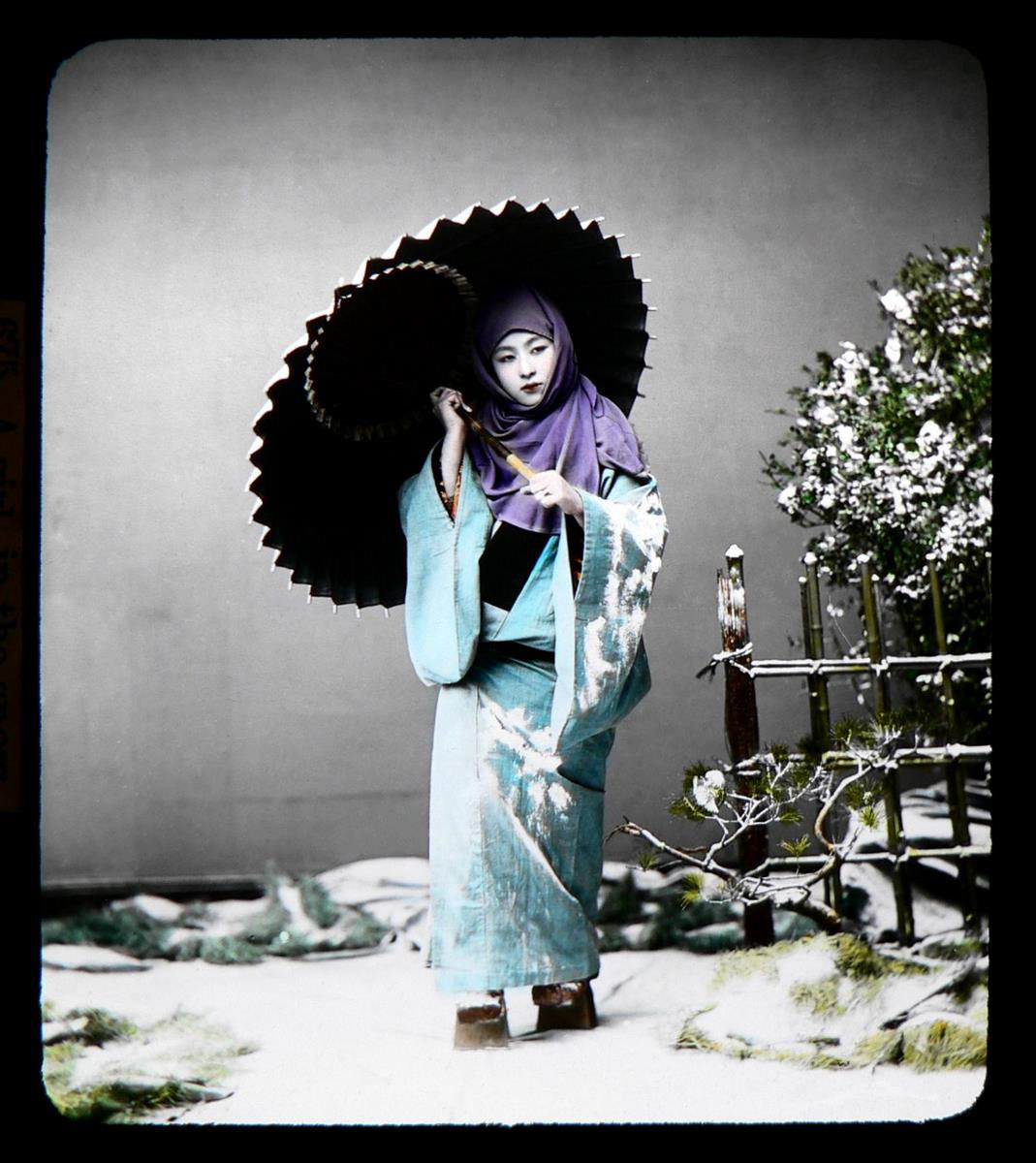
Girl with umbrella in snow

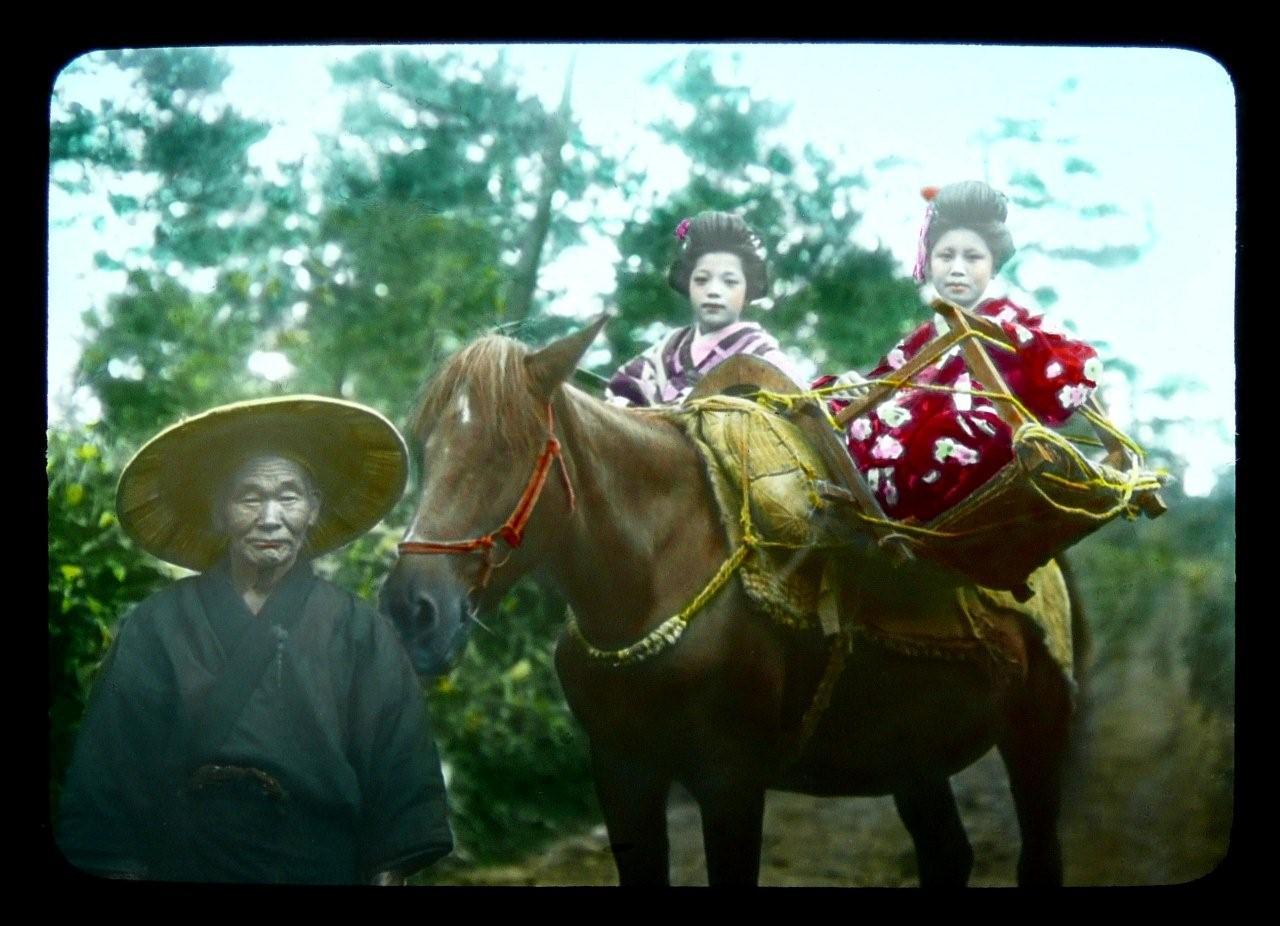
Japanese pack horse carrying two women

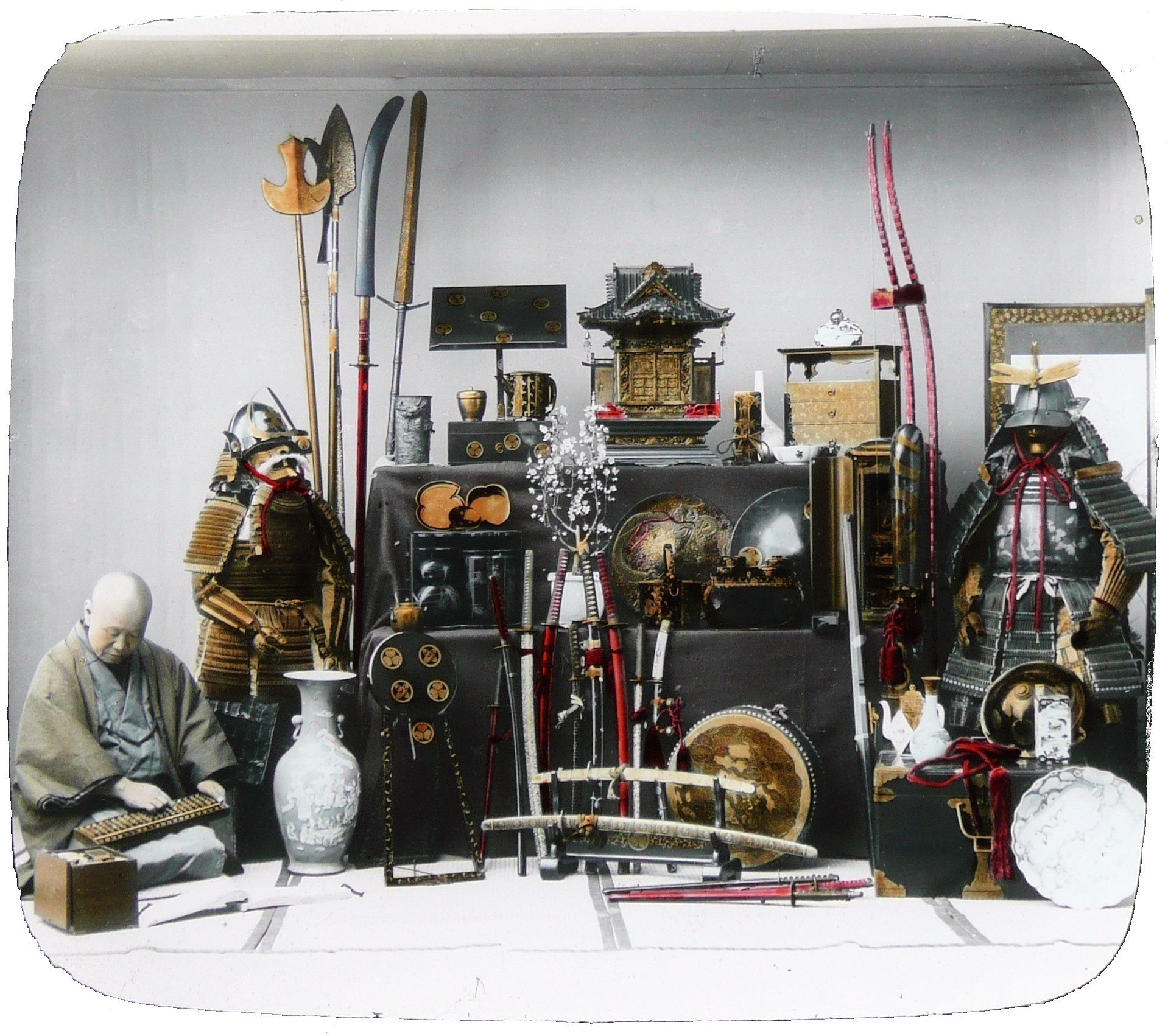
Japanese military paraphernalia

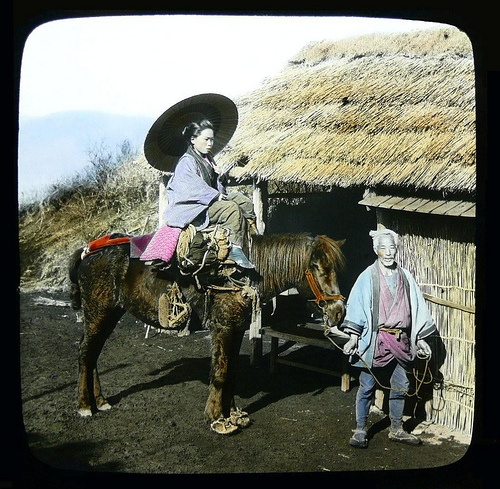
Woman riding pack horse, 1892-1895
