= Fukagawa Itomaro =

Japanese businessman

Fukagawa Itomaro was the secretary and owner of the A. Farsari & Co. photographic studio. Following the departure of Watanabe Tokutarō in 1904 or shortly thereafter, Fukagawa became the new owner. A. Farsari & Co. was based in Yokohama, Japan.
