= Naomi Fukagawa =

American nutrition scientist

Naomi Kay Fukagawa is an American nutrition scientist. She is a professor of medicine at the University of Vermont (UVM), and the director of the United States Department of Agriculture's Beltsville Human Nutrition Research Center in Beltsville, Maryland.

== Education and career ==
Fukagawa received her M.D. degree from Northwestern University in 1976, and her Ph.D. in Nutritional Biochemistry from the Massachusetts Institute of Technology in 1985. Before joining UVM in 1995, she served as an assistant professor at Harvard Medical School (1988–94) and at Rockefeller University (1993–95). She originally joined UVM as an associate professor, and was promoted to a full tenured professor there in 2004. She was appointed director of the Beltsville Human Nutrition Research Center in 2015; she will subsequently retire from UVM to head the center.

== Societal activities ==
Fukagawa was elected to the American Society for Clinical Investigation in 1996. She has served as president of the American Society for Clinical Nutrition and the American Society for Nutrition.

== Editorial activities ==
Fukagawa is a former editor-in-chief of the peer-reviewed journal Nutrition Reviews, associate editor of the American Journal of Clinical Nutrition, and assistant editor for the Journal of Nutritional Biochemistry.
