= Dmitri Kedrin =

Russian poet

- Born: Dmitri Borisovich Kedrin; February 17, 1907; Shchegolovka, Russian Empire
- Died: September 18, 1945 (aged 38); Moscow, Soviet Union
- Occupations: Poet, playwright, correspondent
- Children: Svetlana Dmitrievna Kedrina
- Writing career
- Period: 1923–1945

Dmitri Borisovich Kedrin (Russian: Дми́трий Бори́сович Ке́дрин; February 17, 1907 – September 18, 1945) was a Soviet poet. He died in railway-related accident (had been struck by commuter train). Some charge that this accident was murder.

== A sample of Kedrin's poetry ==
"Исповедь"

Смотри, дитя, в мои глаза,
Не прячь в руках лица.
Поверь, дитя:
Глазам ксендза
Открыты все сердца.

Твоя душа грехом полна,
Сама в огонь летит.
Пожертвуй церкви литр вина
И бог тебя простит.

— Dmitri Kedrin
Ekaterinoslav, 1926
Translation:

"Confession"

Look me into the eye, my child,
Don't hide your face from mine.
Believe, child,
the eyes of a priest
care for all hearts and thine.

Your soul is full of sin,
Attracted to great fire.
Endow the church a pint of wine
And you will be forgiven.
