= Tamamura Kōzaburō =

Japanese photographer

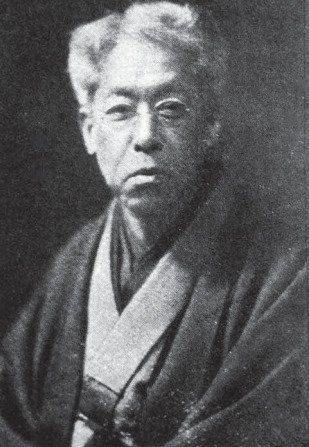
Image of Tamamura Kozaburo

Tamamura Kōzaburō (玉村 康三郎) (1856—1923?) was a Japanese photographer. In 1874 he opened a photographic studio in Asakusa, Tokyo and subsequently moved to Yokohama in 1883, opening his most successful studio. He was an originator of the Yokohama shashin photographic scene. His studio was still operating in 1909.
