= Munetoshi Fukagawa =

Japanese poet

Munetoshi Fukagawa (Japanese: 深川宗俊; real name 前畠雅俊 Masatoshi Maehata, Hiroshima; 1921–2008) was a Japanese poet. Fukagawa worked at Mitsubishi Heavy Industries where he witnessed the Hiroshima bombing, a subject reflected in his poems. His poetry was translated abroad, including into Russian where some of the poems were set to music as a movement the Requiem of composer Mieczyslaw Weinberg. As a foreman at the plant supervising Korean forced labour, he later in the 1970s began a movement to obtain compensation for conscripted labourers.
