= Journal of Nutritional Biochemistry =

- Discipline: Nutrition science
- Language: English
- Edited by: Bernhard Hennig

Publication details
- Former name: Nutrition Reports International
- History: 1970-present
- Publisher: Elsevier
- Frequency: Monthly
- Impact factor: 6.048 (2020)

Standard abbreviations
- ISO 4: J. Nutr. Biochem.

Indexing
- CODEN: JNBIEL
- ISSN: 0955-2863
- LCCN: 90640852
- OCLC no.: 39179006

Links
- Journal homepage; Online access; Online archive

The Journal of Nutritional Biochemistry is a monthly peer-reviewed scientific journal covering biochemical and molecular biological aspects of nutrition science. The journal was established in 1970 as Nutrition Reports International and obtained its current title in 1990, with volume numbering restarting at 1. It is published by Elsevier and the editor-in-chief is Bernhard Hennig (University of Kentucky).

== Abstracting and indexing ==
The journal is abstracted and indexed in:

- BIOSIS Previews
- Current Contents/Agriculture, Biology & Environmental Sciences
- Current Contents/Life Sciences
- EMBASE
- Elsevier BIOBASE
- Index Medicus/MEDLINE/PubMed
- Science Citation Index
- Scopus
