= Photographic studio =

Place where photographs are produced

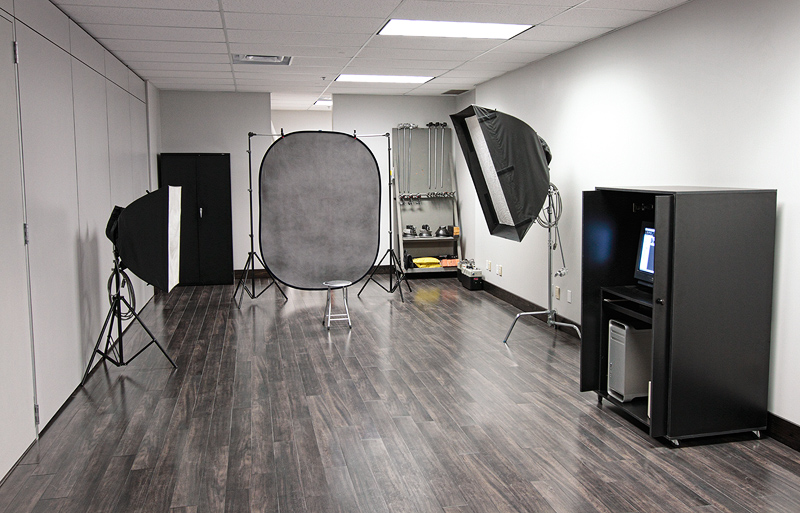
A photographic studio

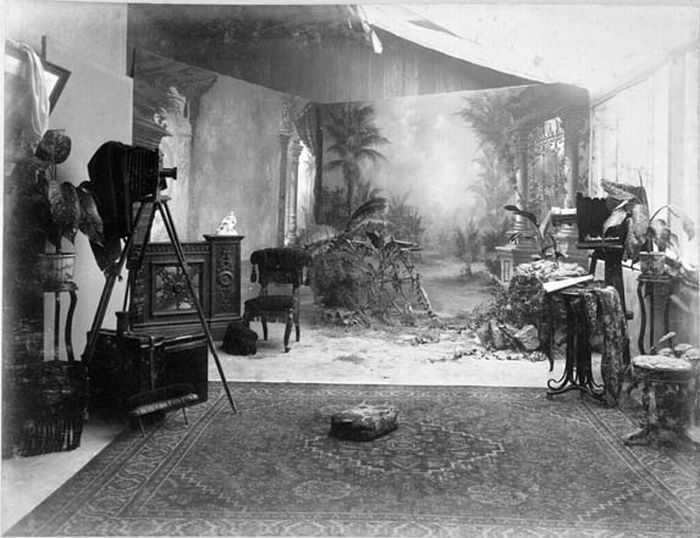
Stafhell & Kleingrothe photo studio in 1898

A photographic studio is often a business owned and represented by one or more photographers, possibly accompanied by assistants and pupils, who create and sell their own and sometimes others’ photographs.

== History ==
Since the early years of the 20th century the business functions of a photographic studio have increasingly been called a photographic agency leaving the term "photographic studio" to refer almost exclusively to the workspace.

The history of photographic studios and photography dates back to the 1840s with the invention of processes for recording camera pictures, by Henry Fox Talbot and Louis Daguerre. The earliest photographic studios made use of natural daylight to create photographic portraits. As already used by artists, a northern light with no direct sunlight was favoured.

The first use of a "flash" dates back to 1839 when Levett Landon Boscawen Ibbetson used limelight to photograph very small objects. Limelight was produced by placing a piece of lime into a flame fuelled with oxy-hydrogen. Photographic studios started using flashes in 1840 and in 1864 the next technological breakthrough, magnesium wire, became the new artificial light source. However, not everyone could afford it as they were quite expensive and dangerous. These flashes were also known as 'hot lights' and could have exploded. By 1860s they were in common use in professional studios. 'Tungsten Lights' or 'Hot Lights' were still in use. Around the 1870s even smaller studios got access to flash lights or strobes.

People tried many things from time to time when setting up studios to cope up with different hurdles in photography. However, lighting was a big hurdle. Flash powder was the first means of artificial lighting that allowed to produce sufficient brightness to capture the action of the film. However, this industry developed at a faster rate. With advancement in camera lenses, lighting and other techniques and equipment, studio photography gained hold and it became quite easier to produce images within a studio.

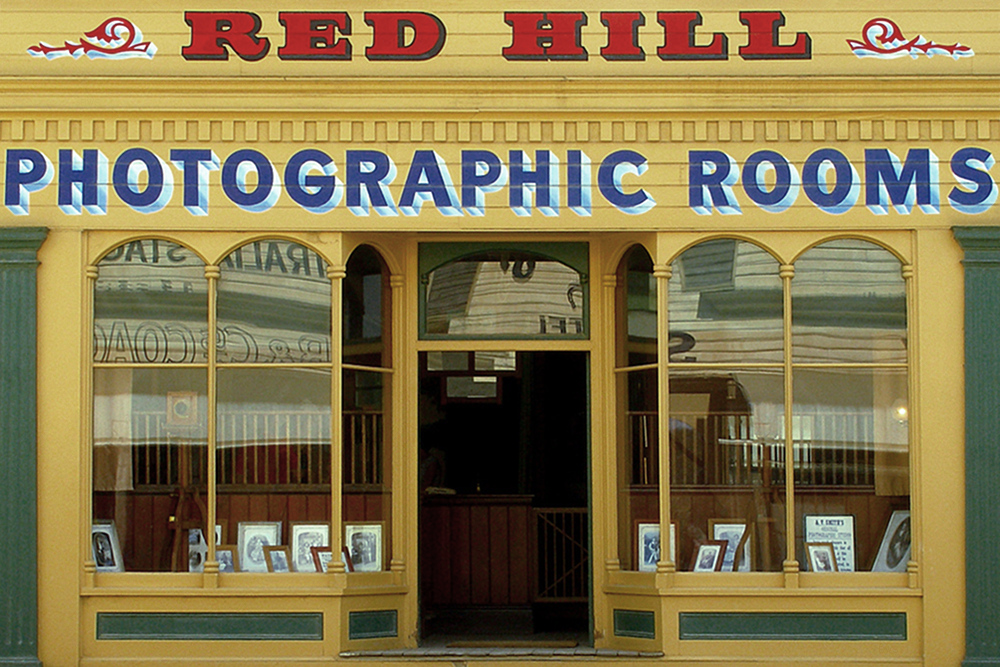
Storefront of an 1850s portrait studio, Sovereign Hill, Australia

The first commercial use of photography was in the production of portraits. Photography replaced painting almost completely from the 1840s, with fully equipped studios in existence. The photography process was much shorter and simpler compared to painting, in which the subject and even the painter used to suffer. It became relatively easy and cheap to set up a photographic studio, so by the 1870s there were many thousands of portrait studios in Europe and America. Despite this, remarkably few of the studios have survived to this day in a recognisable form.

The 'calotypes' process was introduced in 1840s. With the introduction of calotypes the production of negatives enabled the photographers to print as many copies as customer required, hence strengthening the very base for the studios. In 1850s small portraits called 'ambrotypes' were being produced. The exposure time varied between 2 and 20 seconds in comparison to 8 hr long exposure when the first still portrait photograph was taken in 1826.

== Gallery ==
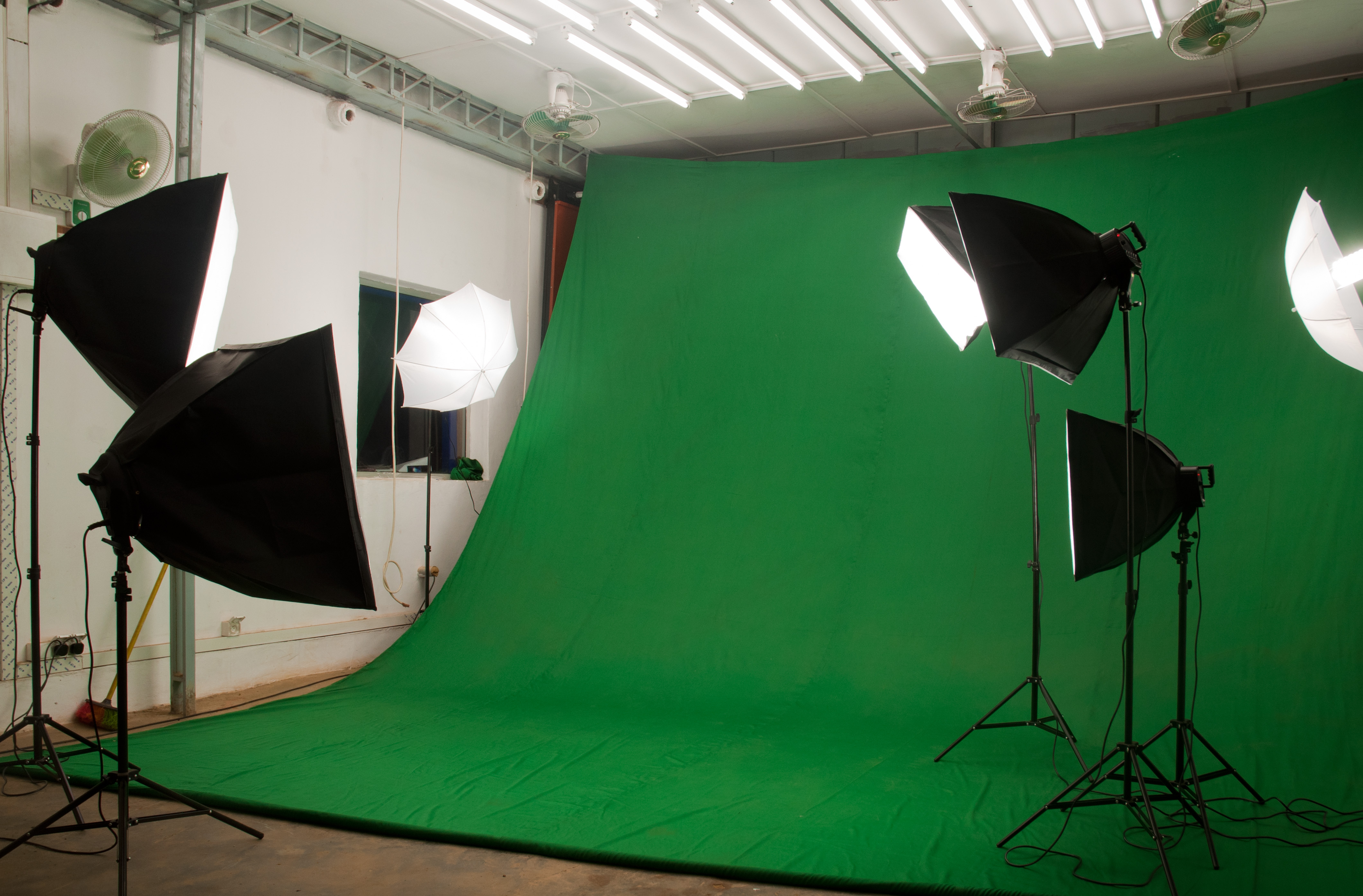
Photography studio with green screen backdrop.

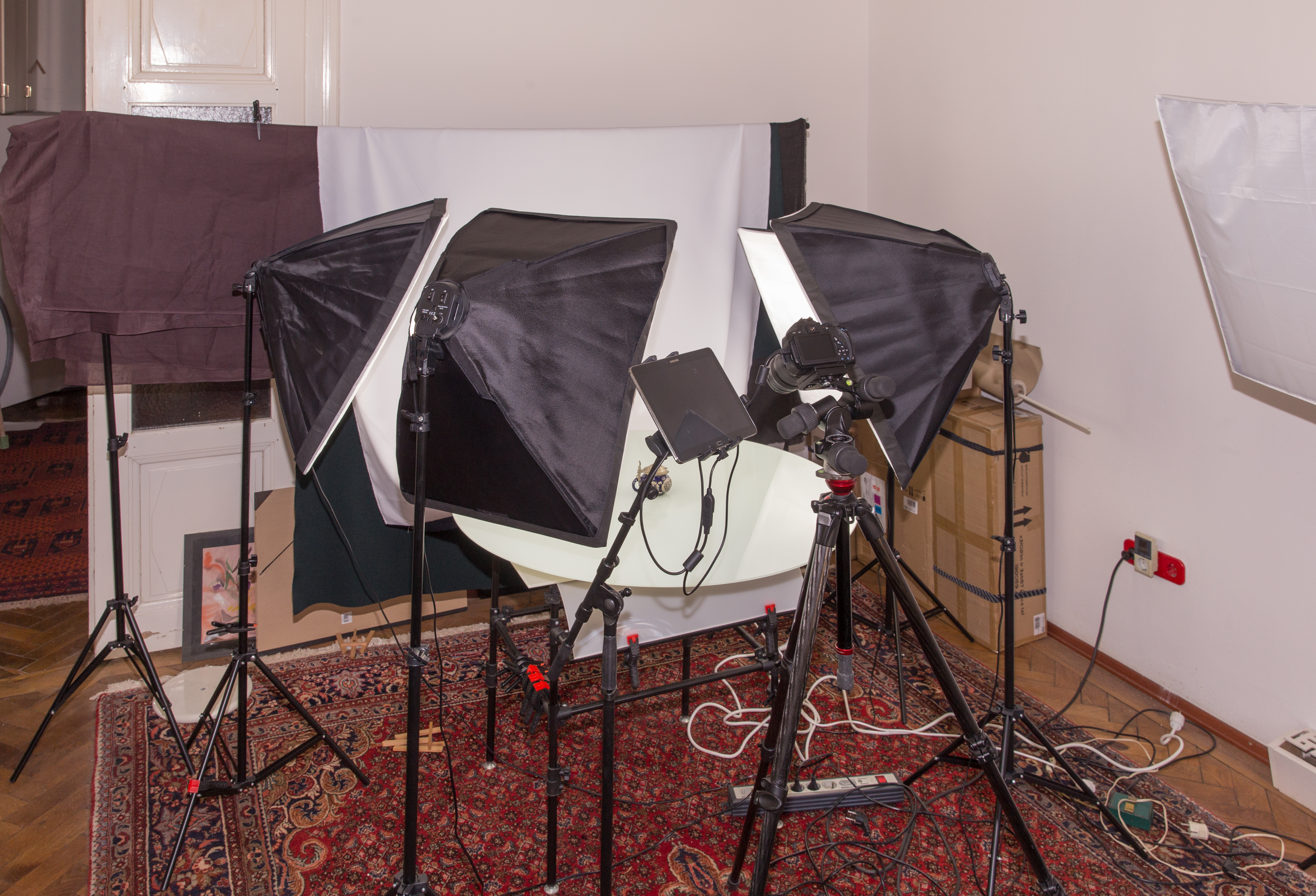
Studio arrangement for product photography and video.

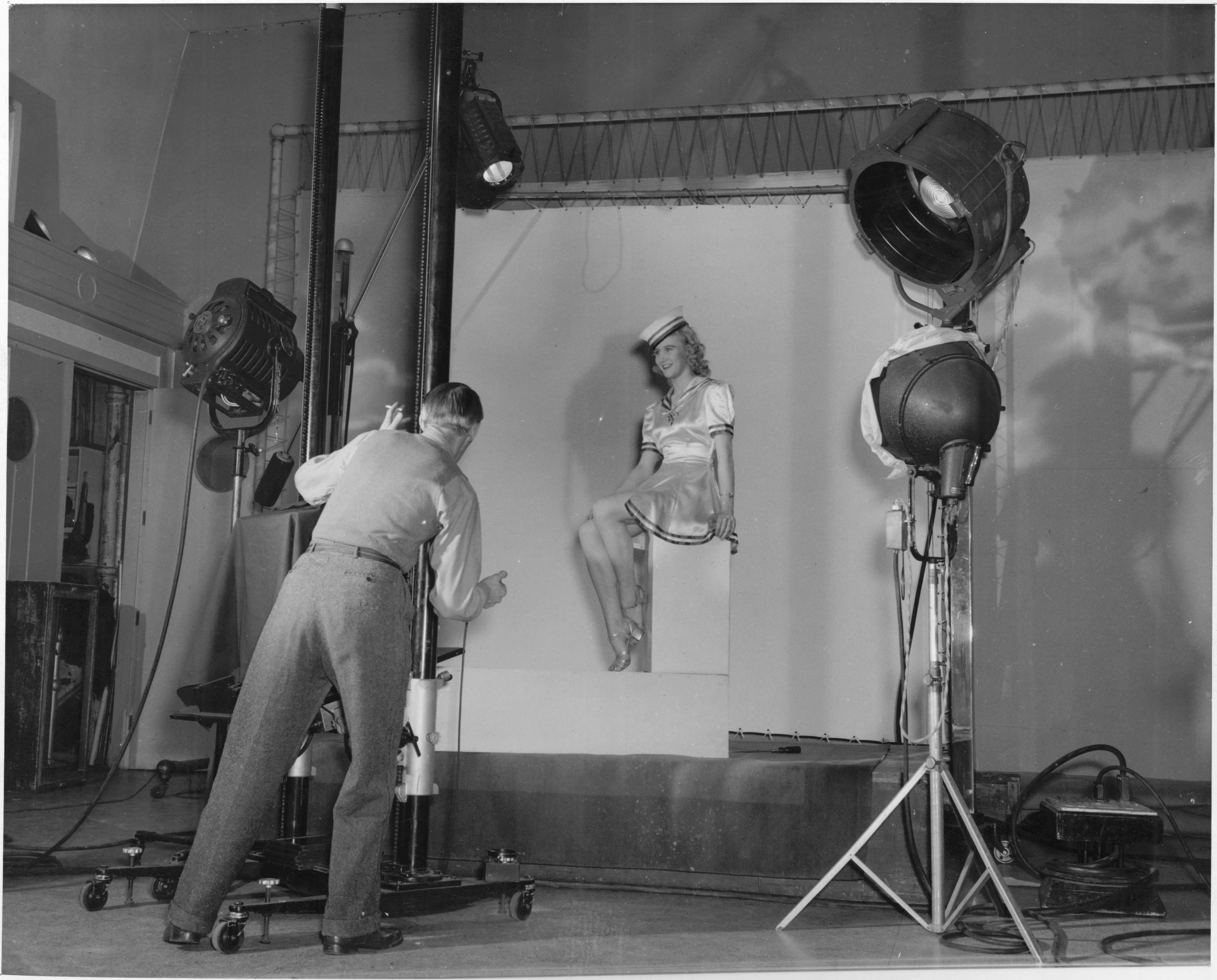
A photography studio in Ontario, Canada (c. 1943).
