= Shinichi Suzuki (disambiguation) =

Shinichi Suzuki (鈴木 鎮一, 1898–1998) was a Japanese classical violinist and creator of the "Suzuki method".

Shinichi Suzuki or Shin'ichi Suzuki may also refer to:

- Suzuki Shin'ichi I (鈴木 真一, 1835–1918), Japanese photographer
- Suzuki Shin'ichi II (鈴木 真一, 1855–1912), Japanese photographer

== See also ==
- Shunichi Suzuki (disambiguation)
