= Suzuki Shin'ichi I =

Japanese photographer

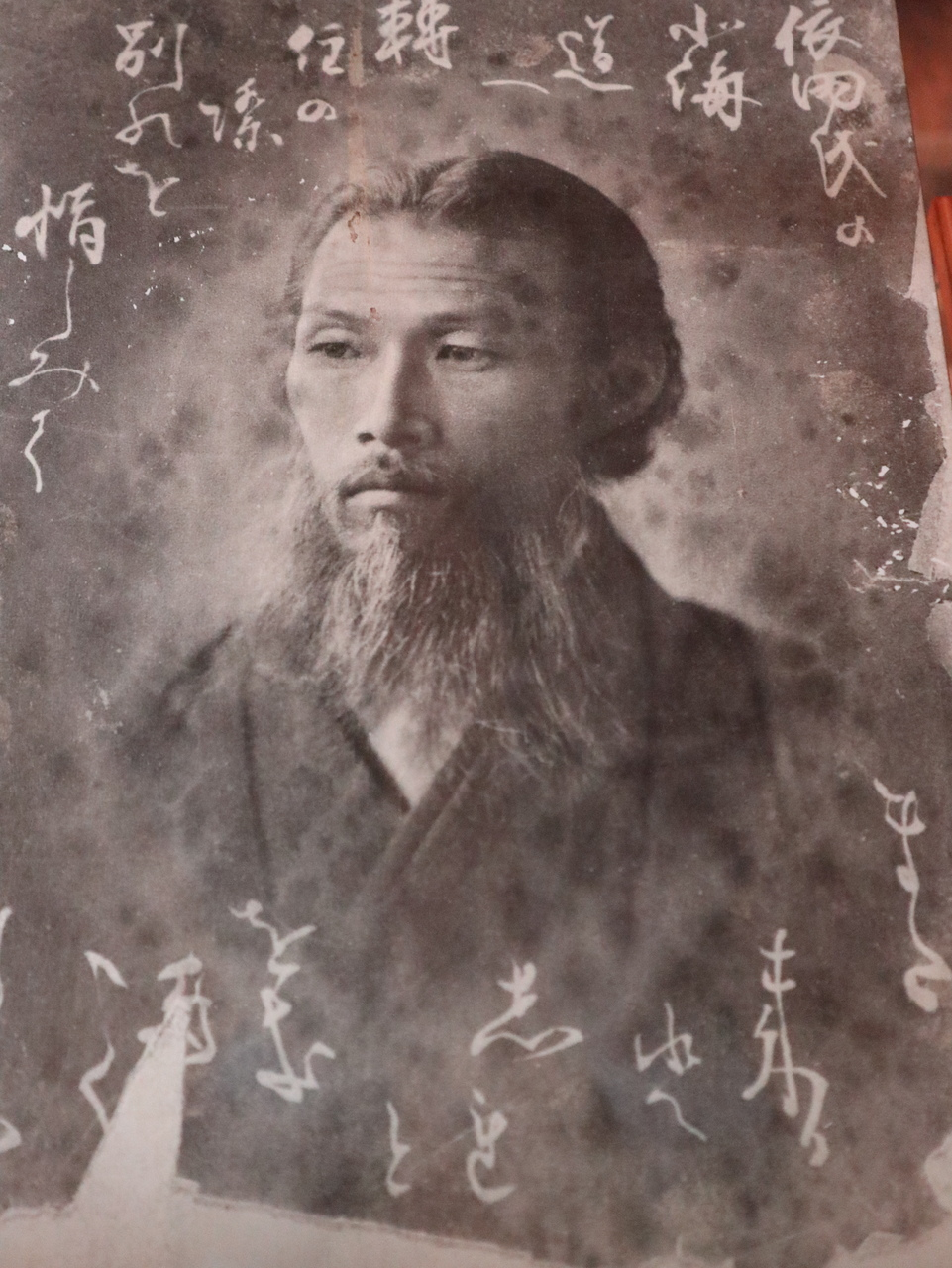
Suzuki Shin'ichi I

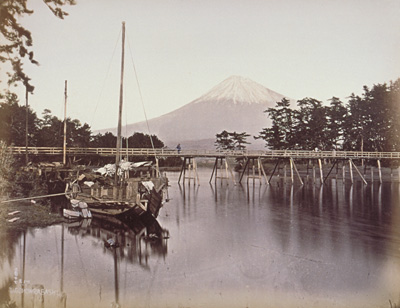
View of Mount Fuji. Hand-coloured albumen silver print, 19th century.

Suzuki Shin'ichi (鈴木 真一; 1835–1918) was a Japanese photographer.

== Early life ==
Suzuki was born as the third son of a family named Takahashi) in Iwashina (岩科村) (now Matsuzaki, Shizuoka) in July 1835. Both his parents died when he was young, and in 1854 he married into the Suzuki family (by the custom known as muko-iri [婿入り]) in Shimoda when he married Suzuki Yoshichi's daughter, working in the family aramono business.

The same year as his marriage, a major tsunami (resulting from one of the Ansei great earthquakes) destroyed the building and ended the business.

At first working in sericulture, Suzuki often traveled to Yokohama, where he soon apprenticed at the Yokohama photographic studio of Shimooka Renjō in 1867.

== Photographic career ==
In 1872–1873 Suzuki was commissioned by J. R. Black, publisher of The Far East, to produce a photographic series documenting rural life. Images from this series continued to appear in Suzuki albums until the 1880s. In November 1873 Suzuki set up his own studio, producing portraits and souvenir albums.

The same year, Okamoto Keizō 岡本圭三, a successor of his at Shimooka's studio, married Suzuki's daughter, and Okamoto joined the Suzuki family (muko-iri again). Okamoto became Suzuki Shin'ichi II, and the older photographer changed his own name in turn.

About this time Suzuki may have studied photography under Yokoyama Matsusaburō. In 1884 he moved to a newly built, western-style two-storey studio. A branch studio was opened in Kudanzaka, Tokyo and operated by Suzuki II. Suzuki's photographs were highly acclaimed and he won an award for them in 1877, and in 1889 he and Maruki Riyō were commissioned to photograph Emperor Meiji and his wife.

Purchasers of his works were mostly foreign residents and visitors, and in addition to sales from his own studio, Suzuki's photographs were distributed by Sargent, Farsari & Co.

His studio was advertised as early as 1880, in Keeling's Guide to Japan, and subsequently in the Japan Directory until 1908, offering daguerreotypes, photographs (including large format hand-coloured albumen prints), and Suzuki's innovation of photographs printed on porcelain, the latter selling for 12 yen each. These advertisements indicate that from 1893 the Yokohama studio was run by I. S. Suzuki, that is, Suzuki's son Izaburō. Suzuki Shin'ichi retired in 1892 and he died in December 1918 at the age of 83.

Works of Suzuki Shin'ichi
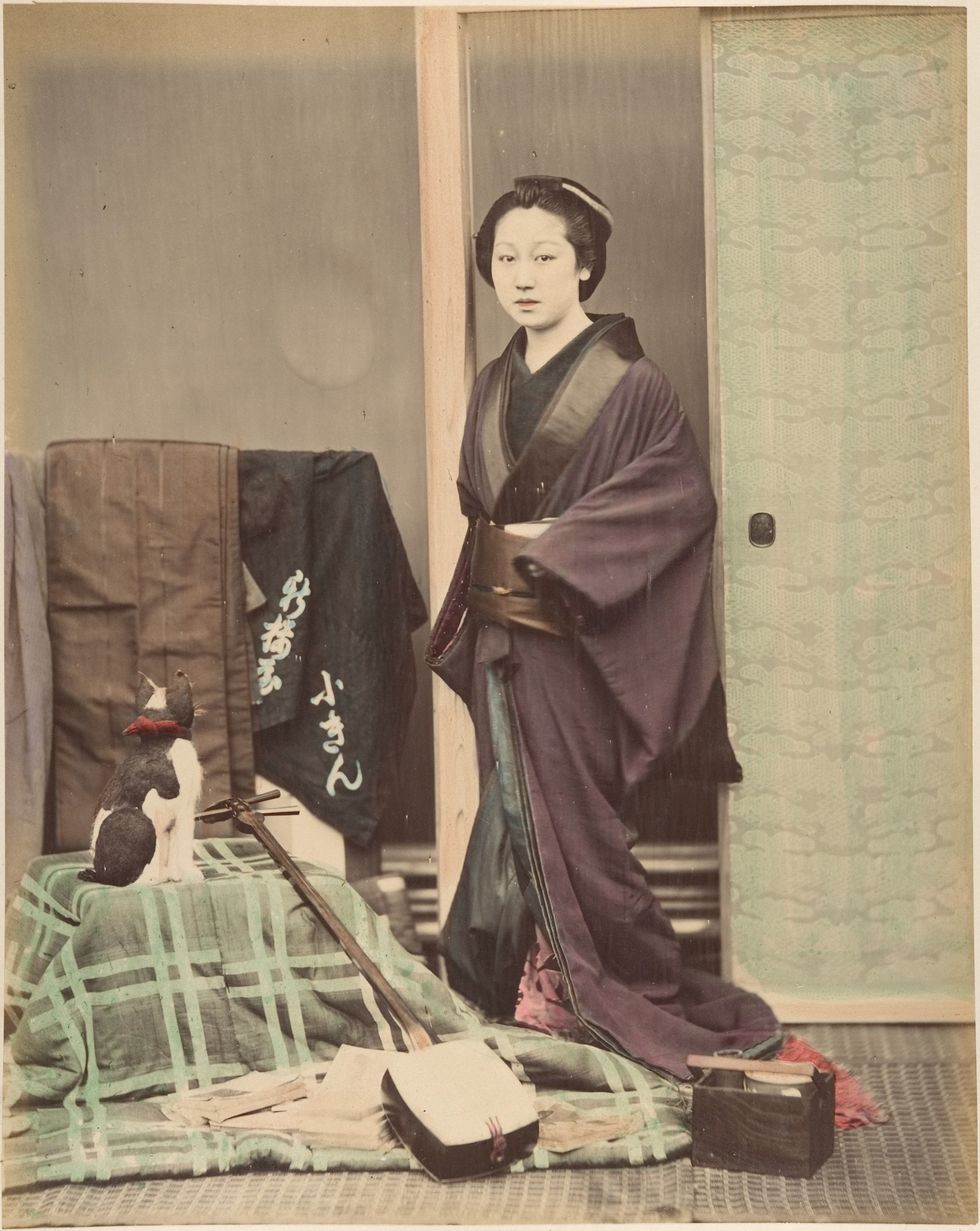
Japanese Woman in Traditional Dress Posing with Cat and Instrument ca. 1870s.

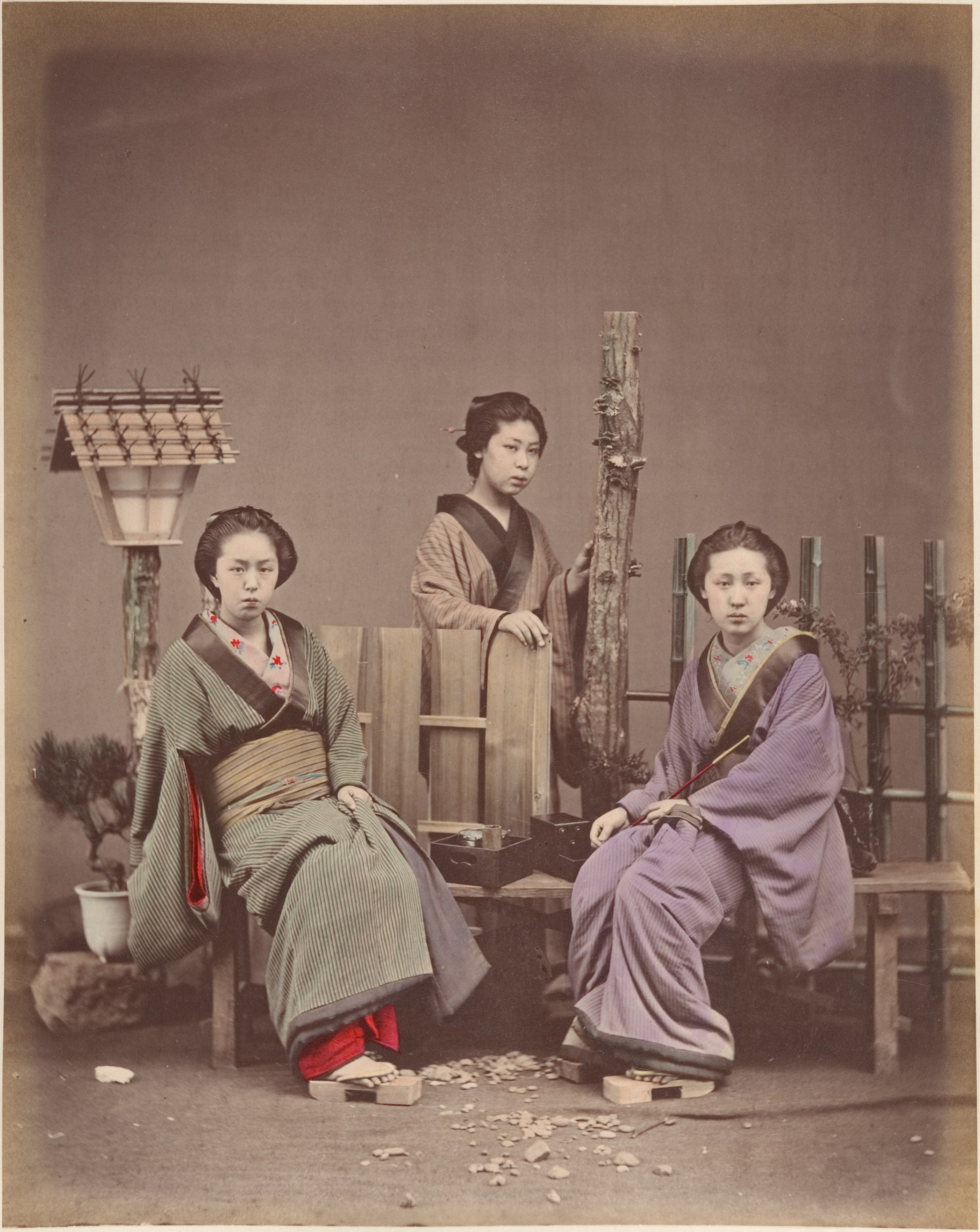
Japanese Women in Traditional Dress, ca. 1870s.

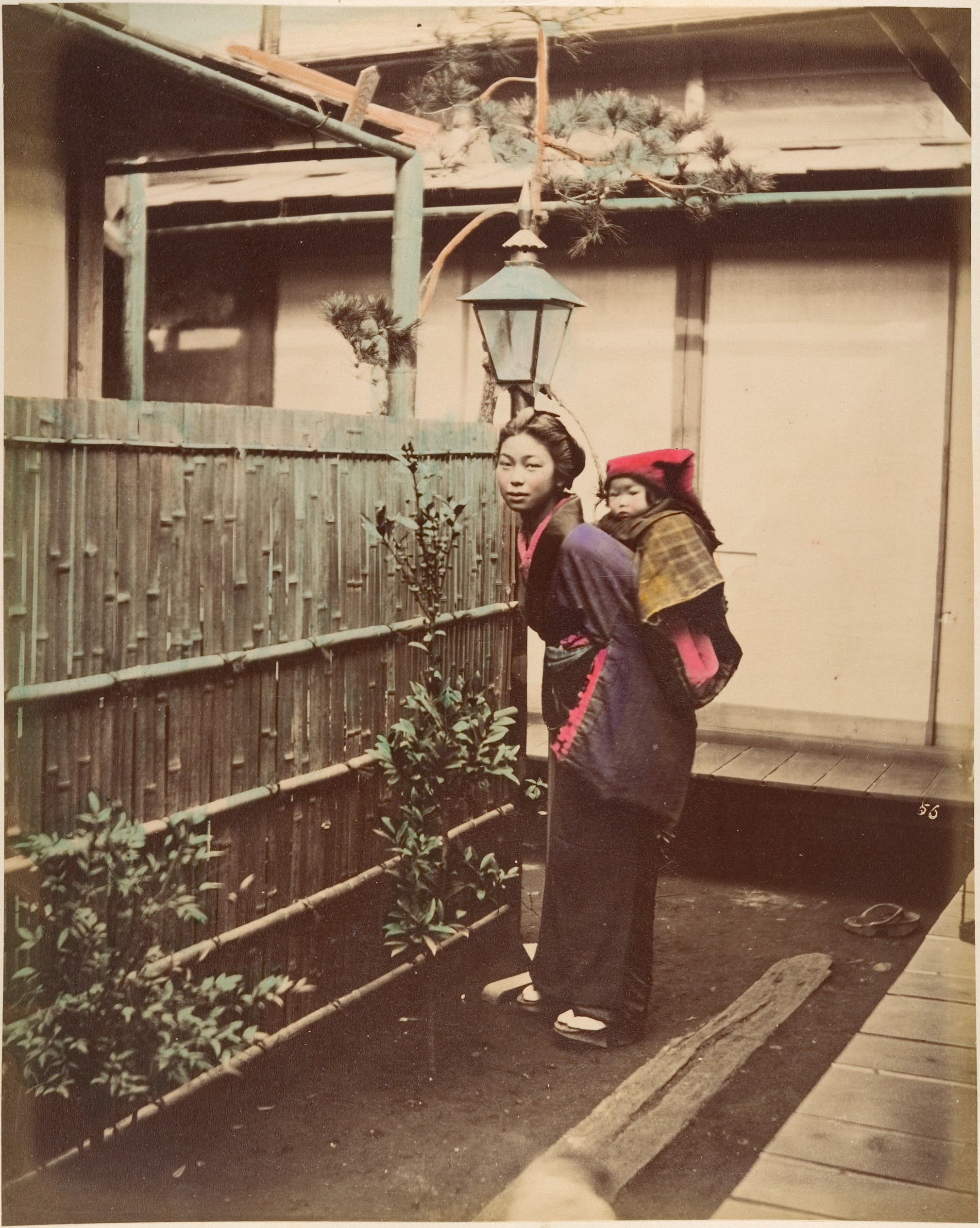
Japanese Woman in Traditional Dress Posing with a Child on her Back, ca. 1870s.

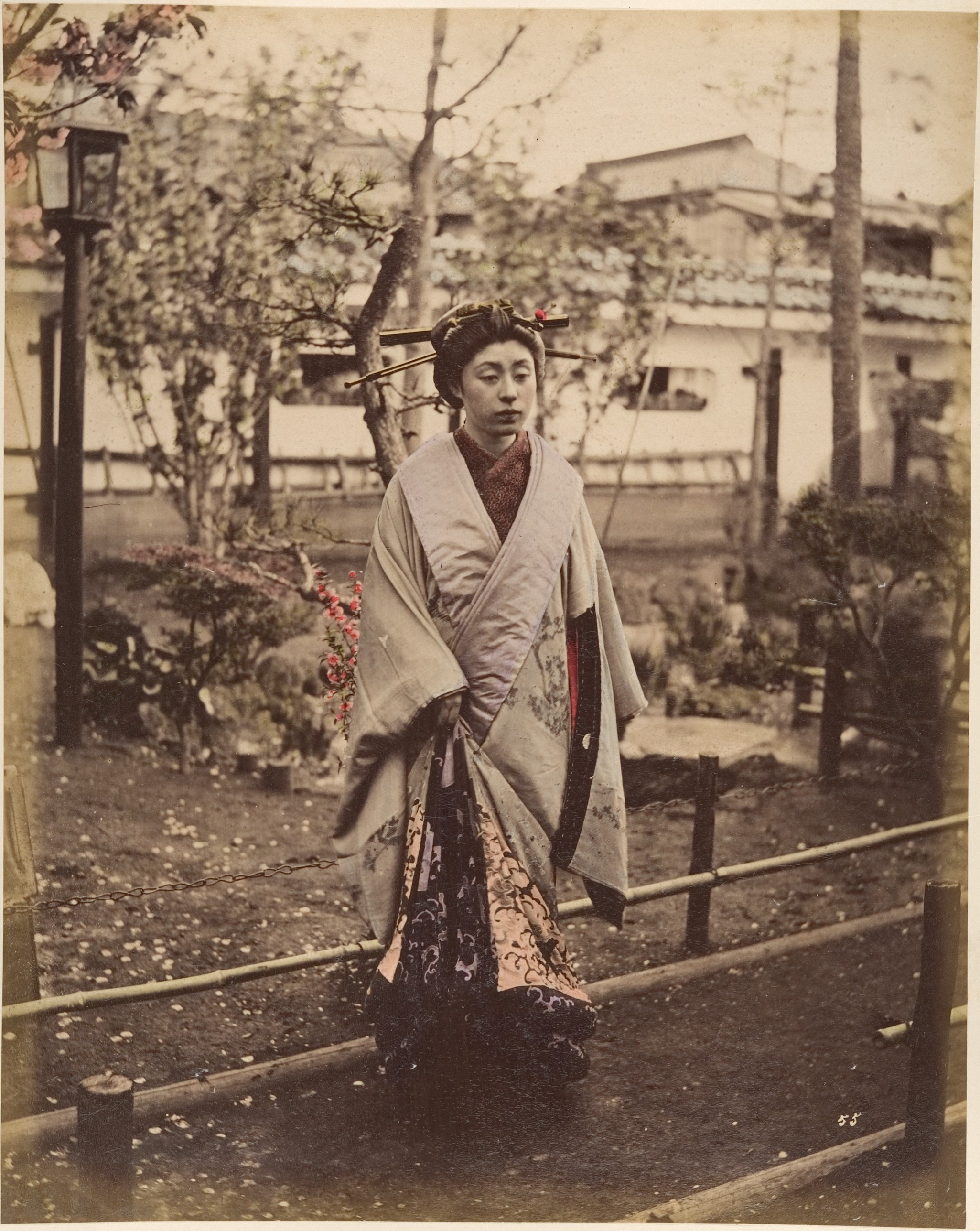
Japanese Woman in Traditional Dress Posing Outdoors ca. 1870s.
Example 1
