= Kairakutei Black I =

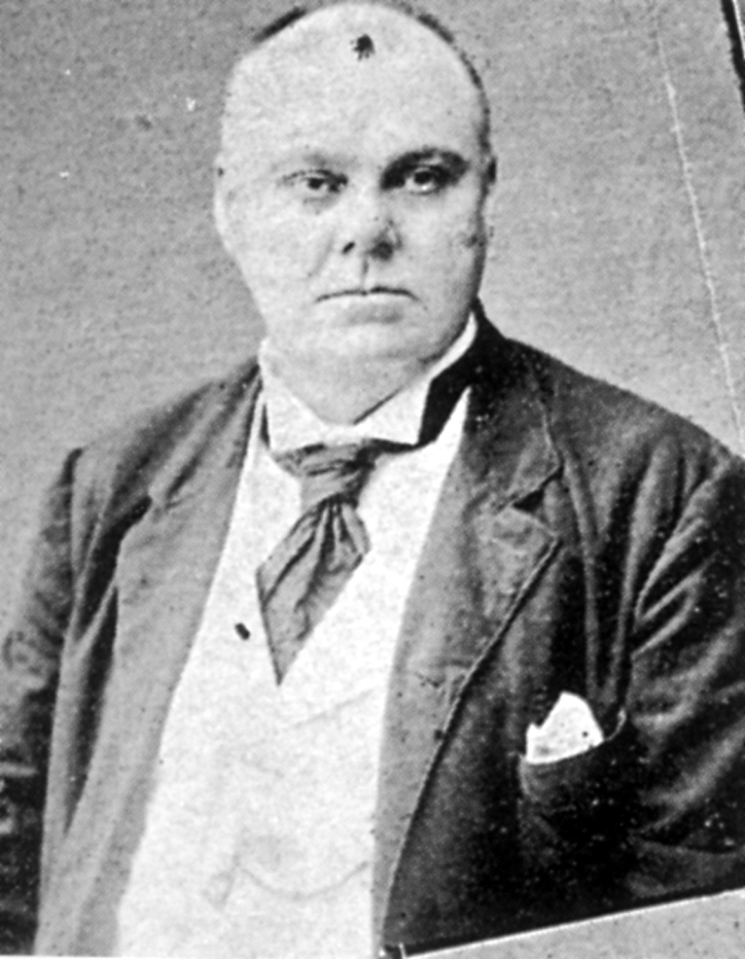
- Henry Black, (1858–1923).
- Born: 22 December 1858; Adelaide, Australia
- Died: 19 September 1923 (aged 64)
- Occupation: Kabuki actor
- Known for: Japan's first foreign-born rakugoka
- Notable work: "Biiru no Kakenomi"

Henry James Black (22 December 1858 – 19 September 1923) was a kabuki actor and Japan's first foreign-born rakugoka, or public storyteller, performing under the name Kairakutei Black I (初代 快楽亭 ブラック, Shodai Kairakutei Burakku). He was also known by the name Black Ishii (石井 貎刺屈, Ishii Buratsuku).

== Early life ==
His father was J. R. Black, a singer and publisher of several newspapers in Japan, including The Far East. Black was born in Adelaide, Australia on 22 December 1858 and lived in Japan from the age of three. Following in his father's entertainer streak, he became the first foreign-born Kabuki actor.

Black worked as an English teacher for about ten years, even publishing a textbook during that time. He had picked up Japanese in part by hanging round his father's publishing company, and began appearing on stage telling entertaining stories about famous European historical figures. His audience was astounded to see a foreigner not only fluent in Japanese but also fluent enough to make them laugh. He published some of these stories in book form. By the early 1890s, English teaching had declined in popularity, and Black took up rakugo in defiance of his mother and brother, who felt it was not only undignified but also unstable work. The rakugo master, Sanyutei Encho gladly took him under his wing.

== Kabuki and rakugo ==
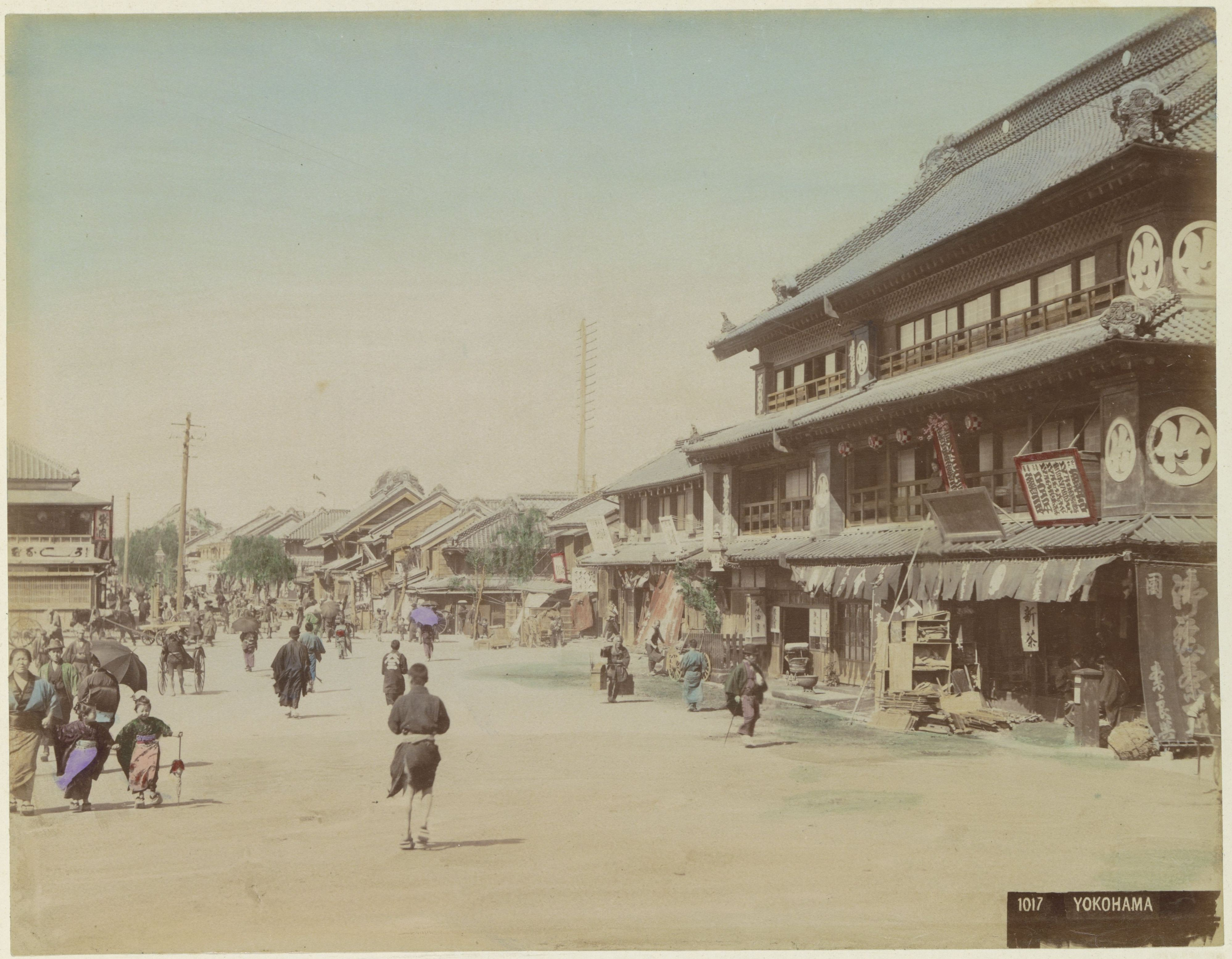
The yose theater where Black made his debut

In March 1891, Black adopted the stage name Kairakutei (Pleasure) Black (快楽亭ブラック) and soon after tried his hand at acting on the Kabuki stage. He was an instant hit, playing female roles, and continued to issue printed versions of his rakugo stories. His mother, and especially his brother, John were increasingly hostile. John actually burst into one of his performances and succeeded in bringing it to an early end by loudly yelling out insults and calling him an embarrassment to the family. The following year, Black reacted by taking Japanese nationality, and the name Ishii Black. He had been adopted by Ishii Mine, a sweet shop owner, and appears to have largely severed links with his family from that point.

In 1892, Black played the role of Banzuiin Chōbei at the Haruki Theatre after starting to be tutored by Ichikawa Danjūrō IX. This event was regarded as being a meeting between two reformists.

Black married Mine's daughter, Aka, but the marriage ended in divorce within two years. In 1903, Black made possibly the first gramophone recording in Japan, one of his stories, for the British Gramophone Company. In 1904, he unveiled his comic masterpiece, "Biiru no Kakenomi" (The Beer Drinking Bet) in which a man's friend bets him he can't drink fifteen bottles of beer in one sitting. The man accepts the challenge but drops into a pub on the way over to check that he can manage it (with the obvious result that he was already too inebriated to drink another fifteen before he even got started.) A version of this story is still a popular rakugo tale even today.

Black was continually on tour but as time passed he became depressed about his declining popularity and earnings. He attempted suicide in 1908 by drinking arsenic, but survived. His career slowly wound down, and he lived with his adopted son, Ishii Seikichi, another entertainer and his family. Ishii Black died of a stroke on 19 September 1923 at the age of 64 and is buried in Yokohama Foreign Cemetery.
