= Inazusa Station =

Railway station in Shimoda, Shizuoka Prefecture, Japan

Inazusa Station 稲梓駅
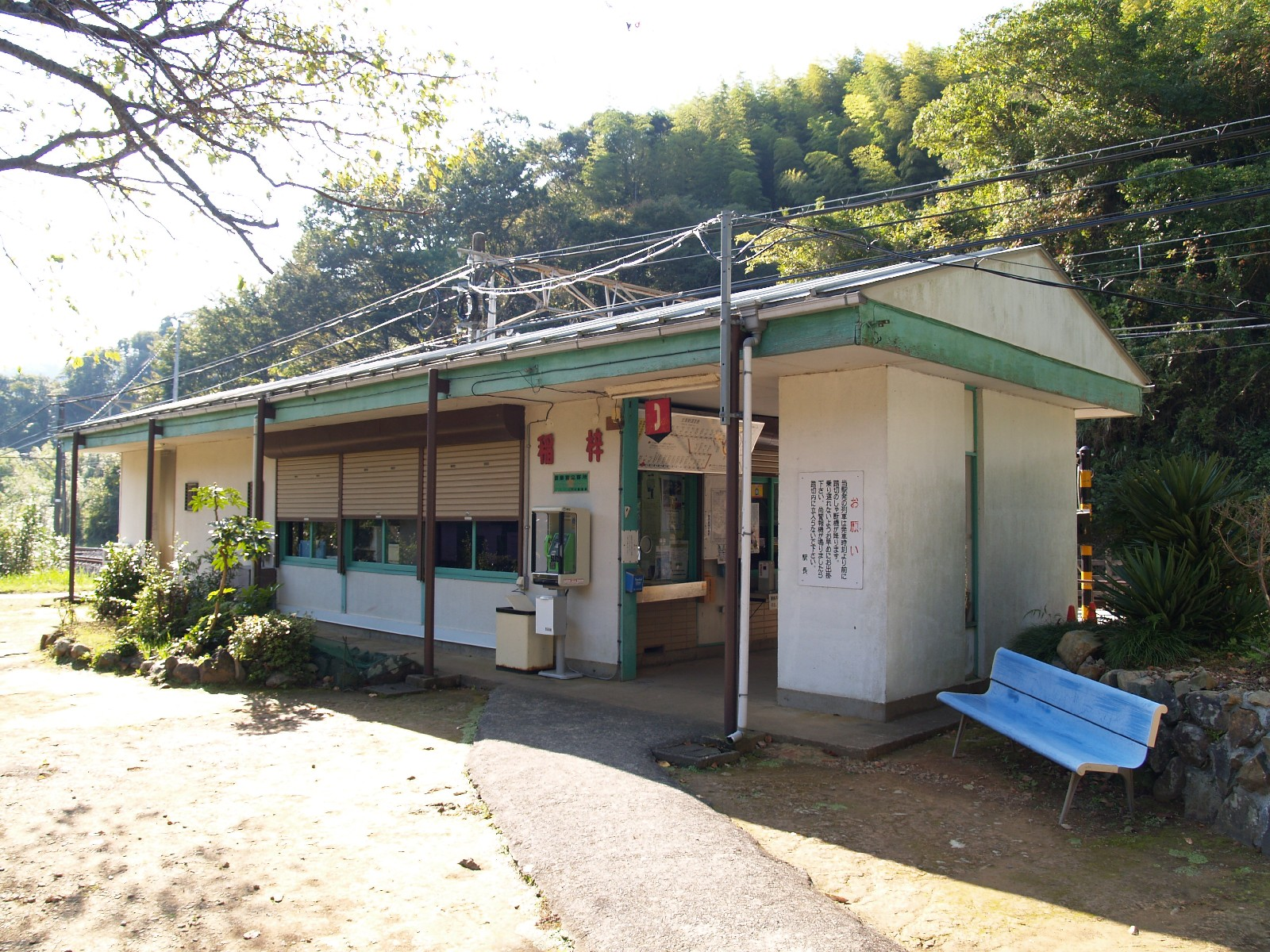
- Exterior of Inazusa Station in November 2008

General information
- Location: Ochiai 92-1, Shimoda-shi, Shizuoka-ken; Japan
- Coordinates: 34°43′16.96″N 138°56′57.58″E
- Operator: Izukyū Corporation
- Line: ■ Izu Kyūkō Line
- Distance: 40.7 kilometers from Itō
- Platforms: 1 island platform

Other information
- Status: Unstaffed
- Station code: IZ14

History
- Opened: December 10, 1961.

Passengers
- FY2017: 25 daily
Location
- Location within Shizuoka Prefecture Location within Japan

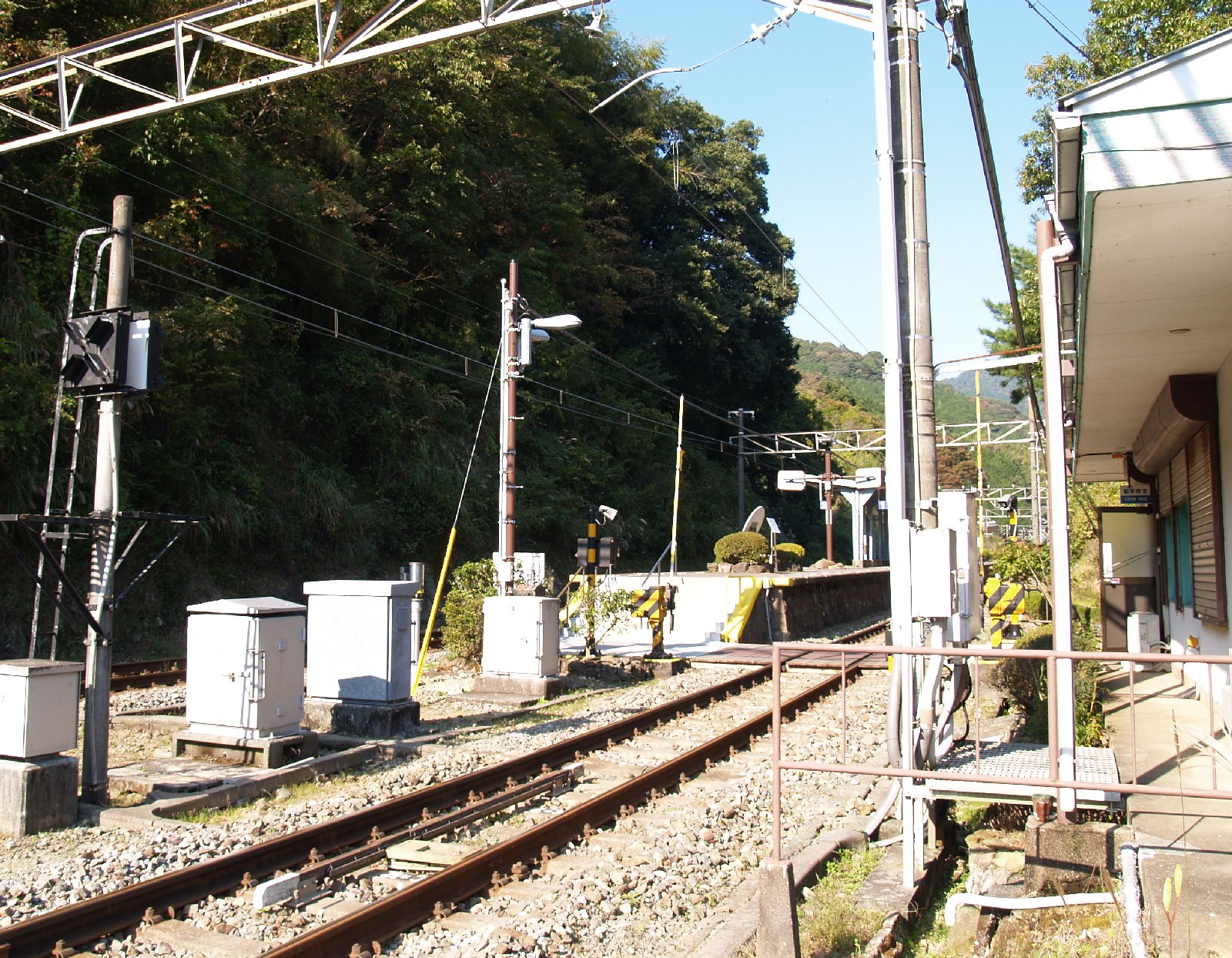
Platform

Inazusa Station (稲梓駅, Inazusa-eki) is a railway station in the city of Shimoda, Shizuoka Prefecture, Japan, operated by the privately owned Izu Kyūkō Line .

== Lines ==
Inazusa Station is served by the Izu Kyūkō Line, and is located 40.7 kilometers from the official starting point of the line at Itō and is 57.6 kilometers from Atami.

== Station layout ==
The station has one island platform serving two tracks, connected to the small station building by a level crossing. The station is unattended.

=== Platforms ===
1	■ Izu Kyūkō Line	Izukyū Shimoda
2	■ Izu Kyūkō Line	Itō ・ Izu-Atagawa・ Izu-Kōgen ・ Atami

== Adjacent stations ==
«	Service	»
Izu Kyūkō Line
Kawazu	Local	Rendaiji

== History ==
Inazusa Station was opened on December 10, 1961.

== Passenger statistics ==
In fiscal 2017, the station was used by an average of 25 passengers daily (boarding passengers only).

== Surrounding area ==
- Inazusa Elementary School
- Inazusa Middle School
- Uehara Museum of Modern Art

== See also ==
- List of railway stations in Japan
