= Matsuchi =

Matsuchi (written: 待乳 or 真土) may refer to:

- Nakajima Matsuchi (中島 待乳) (1850–1938), Japanese photographer
- Matsuchi Station (真土駅, Matsuchi-eki), train station in Matsuno, Kitauwa District, Ehime Prefecture, Japan
