= Shun'ichi Suzuki =

Shunichi Suzuki may refer to:

- Shunichi Suzuki (governor) (鈴木 俊一, 1910–2010), Japanese politician and bureaucrat
- Shun'ichi Suzuki (politician) (鈴木 俊一, born 1953), Japanese politician

== See also ==
- Shin'ichi Suzuki (disambiguation)
