= Suzuki Shin'ichi II =

Japanese photographer

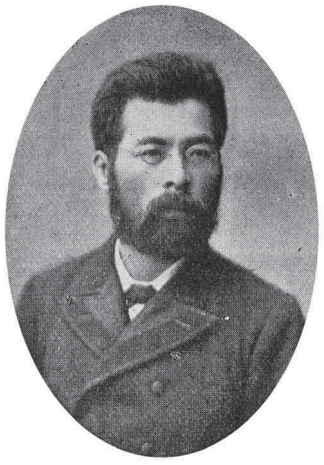
Image of Suzuki Shin'ichi II

Suzuki Shin'ichi (鈴木 真一; 1855–1912) was the younger of two early Japanese photographers to bear that name.

== Early life ==
Suzuki's original name was Okamoto Keizō (岡本圭三) and he was born in Izu. From an early age he enjoyed drawing and painting, and at thirteen or fourteen he set off for Yokohama determined to become an artist.

He became a student of the artist Charles Wirgman, a friend and former partner of the photographer Felice Beato. On seeing a photograph of a wrestler, Okamoto was so taken with the detail and image quality of the novel medium that he decided to become a photographer.

Suzuki learned photography at the Yokohama photographic studio of Shimooka Renjō, where he worked for a number of years from 1870, and where he met his future father-in-law, Suzuki Shin'ichi I, who was also apprenticed to Shimooka. In 1873 Okamoto married Suzuki's daughter Nobu (のぶ), and — by the custom known as muko-iri (婿入り) — moved into the Suzuki family, adopting the father's name. (The older photographer thereupon changed his own name.)

== Photographic career ==
In 1876 Okamoto, now Suzuki, left Shimooka's studio, perhaps to work in a photographic studio in Nagoya, and then under Yokoyama Matsusaburō, and in 1879 went to San Francisco, where he studied negative retouching and other skills under I. W. Taber, thereby perhaps becoming the first Japanese photographer to study abroad.

On his return to Japan, Suzuki became the successful operator of his father-in-law's new branch studio in Kudanzaka, Tokyo. His photographs, often large hand-coloured albumen prints, won prizes at international exhibitions in Europe and Japan and he was commissioned to photograph such persons of rank as the Hawaiian King Kalākaua in 1881, the Crown Prince Tōgu (東宮) in 1888 (for which he was paid $50), and the Japanese Empress Dowager in 1890.

In the same year, Suzuki was commissioned by the Japanese government to produce photographic albums of views along the Tōkaidō to be presented to Tsarevich Nicholas Alexandrovich of Russia (later Tsar Nicholas II). When the Tsarevich's visit to Japan was cut short following an attempt on his life, the albums were instead presented to Russia and Greece.

Similar photographic albums were given to senior officials in the United States and Europe. In spite of this success, there is no record of the Suzuki studio in Tokyo after 1903. Since 1893, the Yokohama studio established by his father-in-law had been operated by I. S. Suzuki — that is, Izaburō, the son of Suzuki Shin'ichi I — and it continued operation until 1908.

After the Russo-Japanese War, Suzuki made an unfortunate investment in the transport industry, and the family was ruined. Suzuki died some time later, in 1912.
