= Esaki Reiji =

Japanese photographer

- 江崎 礼二
- Born: 1845; Mino, Gifu Prefecture, Japan
- Died: 7 June 1910 (aged 64–65); Tokyo, Japan
- Occupations: Photographer, politician

Esaki Reiji (江崎 礼二 (or 禮二); (1845 – 7 June 1910)) was a Japanese photographer.

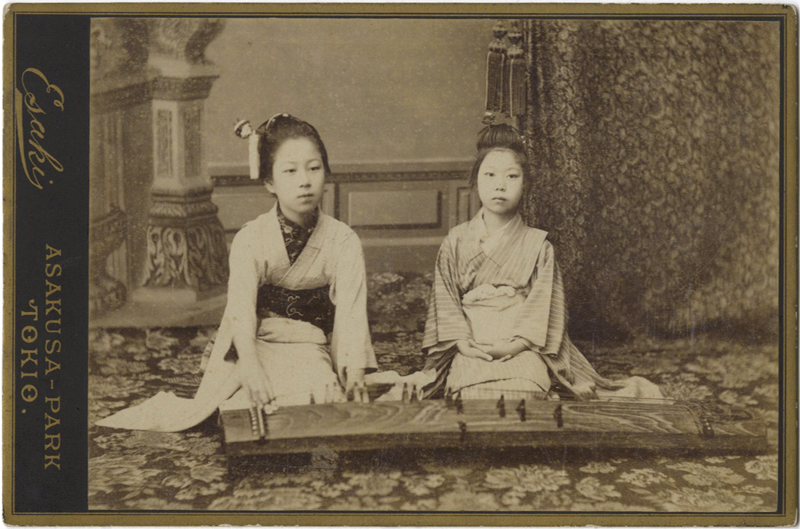
An 1890 photograph by Esaki, of two girls seated with a koto

Esaki was born in Mino, Gifu Prefecture, the son of a farmer. He was a student of Shimooka Renjo in 1871. After a short training period, he opened a photo studio in Tokyo the same year, and moved to Asakusa the following year to become one of the city's top portrait studios. In 1878 he co-founded Kōsaisha, an artists' society. He was the first Japanese photographer to use dry plate negatives, which he imported in 1883 and made him a "quick photographer" specializing in family portraits.

His photograph of a torpedo explosion in the Sumida River in 1883 is considered "the first successful application" of the dry-plate process by a Japanese photographer. In 1884, he photographed a lunar eclipse in Japan, another first. He succeeded in photographing fireworks in 1889. Another of his noted works is "Collage of Babies: One Thousand and Seven Hundred Children That in Three Years Came to My Shop", a composite photograph made in about 1893.

Esaki also served as a politician in the Asakusa Ward Council and Tokyo City Council. He died in Tokyo in 1910, in his sixties. Works by Esaki can be found in the San Francisco Museum of Modern Art, the Museum of Fine Arts in Boston, the Tokyo Photographic Art Museum, and many other collections. Esaki's "Collage of Babies" was included in "Utopia/Dystopia: Construction and Destruction in Photography and Collage", an exhibit at the Museum of Fine Arts, Houston, in 2012.
