= Orrin Freeman =

American photographer (1830–1866)

Orrin Erastus Freeman (1830–1866) was an American professional photographer in China and Japan. Freeman worked in the ambrotype process.

For a short time, Freeman opened a photography studio in Shanghai in 1859 before leaving China for Japan.

Freeman established a studio in Yokohama in 1860. He is considered to have been the first Western professional photographer to establish a permanent residence in Japan.

He taught the elements of photography to Ukai Gyokusen who established the first photographer studio in Edo (Eishin-dō) in 1861. Gyokusen's camera, equipment and supplies were purchased from Freeman.

His death in 1866 was sudden. He is buried in Yokohama Foreigner's Cemetery (Gaijin Bochi).
