= Kikuchi Shingaku =

Japanese photographer

Kikuchi Shingaku (菊地 新学; 1832–1915) was a renowned Japanese photographer. He was taught by Yokoyama Matsusaburō.
