= J. R. Black =

Scottish publisher and journalist

John Reddie Black (8 January 1826 – 11 June 1880) was a Scottish publisher, journalist, writer, photographer, and singer. Much of his career was spent in China and Japan where he published several newspapers including The Far East, a fortnightly newsmagazine illustrated with original photographs.

== Early life ==
John Reddie Black was born in Dysart, Fife, Scotland to English parents. Little is known of Black's early life, but in 1854 he passed up the possibility of a career as an officer in the Royal Navy and moved with his wife to Australia. When his initial business ventures failed, Black embarked on a singing career, touring Australia, India, China, and finally Japan. Performances in Hong Kong and Shanghai in 1864 received enthusiastic reviews in the local press, as did his performances in Yokohama in June and July of the same year. Though he had no intention of staying in Japan, he was to remain there for another eleven or more years.

== Career ==
=== Japan ===
In 1864, Albert Hansard, owner of the Japan Herald (among the first English-language newspapers in Japan), offered J. R. Black a job in his auction business, and in 1865 offered him a partnership in the newspaper. In 1867, the partnership of Hansard and Black declared bankruptcy, but that same year Black founded his own newspaper, the Japan Gazette, a successful daily evening paper offering coverage of the reform movements of the Bakumatsu. He then founded The Far East, in 1870, with a view to promoting "goodwill and brotherhood between the outer world and the subjects of the most ancient imperial dynasty of the world". The first issue appeared on 30 May 1870.

The Far East provided articles on the history, arts, and manners and customs of Japan and was remarkable in that it was illustrated with pasted-in, original photographs, at a time when photomechanical reproduction was still in its infancy. The newspaper's in-house photographer was the Austrian, Michael Moser, but Black, an amateur photographer himself, supplemented Moser's images with his own. Significant photographers whose work also appeared in the newspaper included Uchida Kuichi, the elder Suzuki Shin'ichi, and William Saunders. Black noted some of the early difficulties of publishing The Far East: the deleterious effects of the local weather on photographs, the inferiority and rarity of proper photographic chemicals and paper, and the poor quality (in his eyes) of the images produced by Japanese photographers. Until 1873, Black was unable or unwilling to pay the going rate for photographs, which must have particularly discouraged Western photographers from contributing. However, from 1873 on he began to pay an "honorarium" for the photographs he published. From July 1874, The Far East was published in Shanghai. Accordingly, the photographic subjects appearing in the newspaper were now predominantly Chinese. There is no evidence of further publication of The Far East after December 1878.

Soon after establishing The Far East, and while maintaining the Japan Gazette, Black worked to launch a Japanese-language newspaper. He received little support in this endeavour from other residents of the foreign settlement, but convinced of the need for a high quality newspaper published in Japanese, and with the help of F. da Rosa, a Portuguese friend knowledgeable in Japanese and management, he founded Nisshin Shinjishi (日新真事誌) with the permission of the government and the services of a Japanese editor. The first issue appeared on 23 April 1872. The same year Black received authorisation to publish articles on government policy and the proceedings of the Daijō-kan (太政官), or Council of State. Black openly advocated political reforms, including free speech and greater democracy, and as he became increasingly influential the government manoeuvred to silence him, at the same time carefully avoiding any controversy with British officials. In 1874 the government offered Black the important post of foreign advisor to the Administrative Section of the Sa-in (左院), a chamber of the Daijō-kan, but only on condition that he resign from the Nisshin Shinjishi. He accepted the condition and the position. The following year new laws were introduced forbidding criticism of the government and excluding foreigners from editing Japanese-language newspapers. One week after the laws were implemented, Black was transferred to a lesser position in the Translation Bureau, and soon thereafter he was dismissed. In spite of the Press Regulations, Black launched another newspaper, the Bankoku Shimbun (万国新聞). The government persuaded the British Minister, Harry Parkes, to intervene, which he did, issuing a prohibition against British citizens publishing Japanese-language newspapers. Black fought the prohibition at the courts in London, but was unsuccessful, and soon left Japan, settling in Shanghai.

=== China ===
In 1876 Black founded the Far East Art Agency in Shanghai to sell art works and photographs, including portfolios and albums. He launched the Shanghai Mercury in 1879, a newspaper that continued to be published for 40 years. Black returned to Yokohama, though, where he died on 11 June 1880, leaving a widow and three children. His son, Henry James Black (1858–1923), became well known in Japan under the name Kairakutei Black (快楽亭ブラック, Kairakutei Burakku) as the country's only foreign-born rakugoka, or public storyteller.
