= Ukai Gyokusen =

Japanese photographer

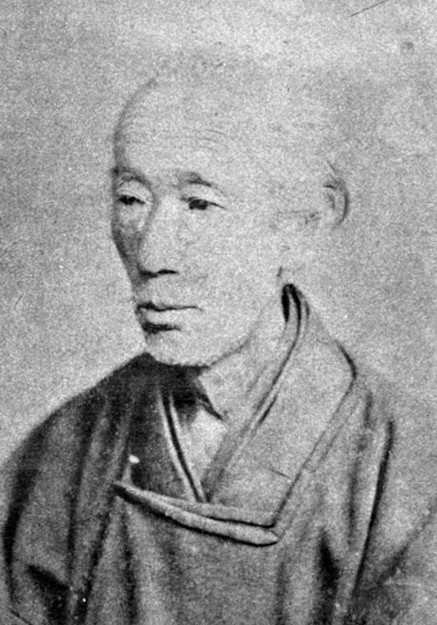

Ukai Gyokusen (鵜飼 玉川; 1807 – May 13, 1887) was a pioneering Japanese photographer. Although he is much less well known than his contemporaries Shimooka Renjō and Ueno Hikoma, he is important for being the first Japanese professional photographer, having established a photographic studio in Edo (now Tokyo) in 1860 or 1861.

Ukai was born in Fuchū, Hitachi Province, which is now Ishioka, Ibaraki Prefecture, the youngest of four brothers. The family was well-off, Ukai's father being a finance commissioner for the daimyō Matsudaira Jijū Yorisaki. When Ukai was thirteen, he was adopted by the sake supplier to another daimyō, Mikawaya, and he thus became a merchant. Ukai developed an interest in art and antiques after coming to know the bunjinga painter Tani Bunchō, and in 1831 he left the sake business to become a full-time artist.

In 1859, with the intention of learning photographic technique, Ukai travelled to Yokohama, one of the few Japanese cities to which foreigners had access and therefore (with Nagasaki) one of the early sites of photography in Japan. Ukai was taught by American photographer Orrin Freeman, whose camera and equipment he eventually may have bought. In 1860 or 1861 he moved to Edo and set up a studio, the Eishin-dō (影真堂), which is mentioned in a late 1861 publication titled Ō-Edo tōsei hanakurabe shohen. By operating in Edo, a city that excluded foreigners, Ukai was unlike Shimooka, Ueno and others whose clientele was predominantly foreign residents and visitors. Instead, Ukai photographed those few Japanese who both knew of photography and could afford to sit for him. Within a few years, Ukai managed to produce over two hundred ambrotype portraits of members of the nobility. He closed his studio in 1867.

In 1879 Ukai worked for the Treasury Printing Office, travelling through western Japan for five months with the Office's director, inspecting and photographing antiquities. The findings of this research were published between 1880 and 1881 as Kokka Yohō (国華余芳), featuring lithographs derived from photographs by Ukai.

In 1883 Ukai buried several hundred of his glass negatives at Yanaka Cemetery in Tokyo. A monument placed at the site included carved biographical details that were supplemented four years later when Ukai died and was interred at the spot. The glass negatives were unearthed in 1956 and reported in the periodical Sun Shashin Shimbun.

Of the many unattributed Japanese ambrotypes that have survived from the 1860s, some were probably produced by Ukai. One photograph that has been positively identified as his work is an 1863 portrait of Miura Shushin.

He died on May 12, 1887.
