= Uehara Museum of Modern Art =

Museum in Shimoda, Shizuoka Prefecture, Japan

- 上原近代美術館
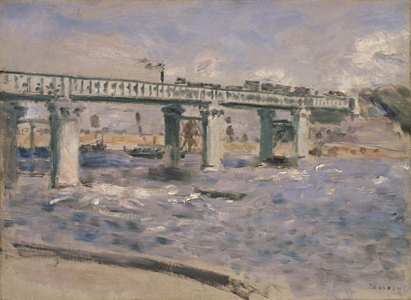
- The Bridge at Argenteuil, by Renoir
- Interactive map of the Uehara Museum of Modern Art area

General information
- Location: 341 Udogane, Shimoda, Shizuoka Prefecture, Japan
- Coordinates: 34°43′43″N 138°55′32″E
- Opened: March 2000

Website
- www.uehara-modernart.jp

Uehara Museum of Modern Art (上原近代美術館, Uehara kindai bijutsukan) opened in 2000 in Shimoda, Shizuoka Prefecture, Japan, to house the collection of Uehara Shōji (上原昭二) of Taisho Pharmaceutical. The collection includes works by Corot, Monet, Cézanne, Renoir, Fujishima Takeji, and Kishida Ryūsei. Adjacent is the Uehara Museum of Buddhist Art (上原仏教美術館), which opened in May 1983.

== See also ==
- Shizuoka Prefectural Museum of Art
