= Shimooka Renjō =

Japanese photographer

- 下岡 蓮杖
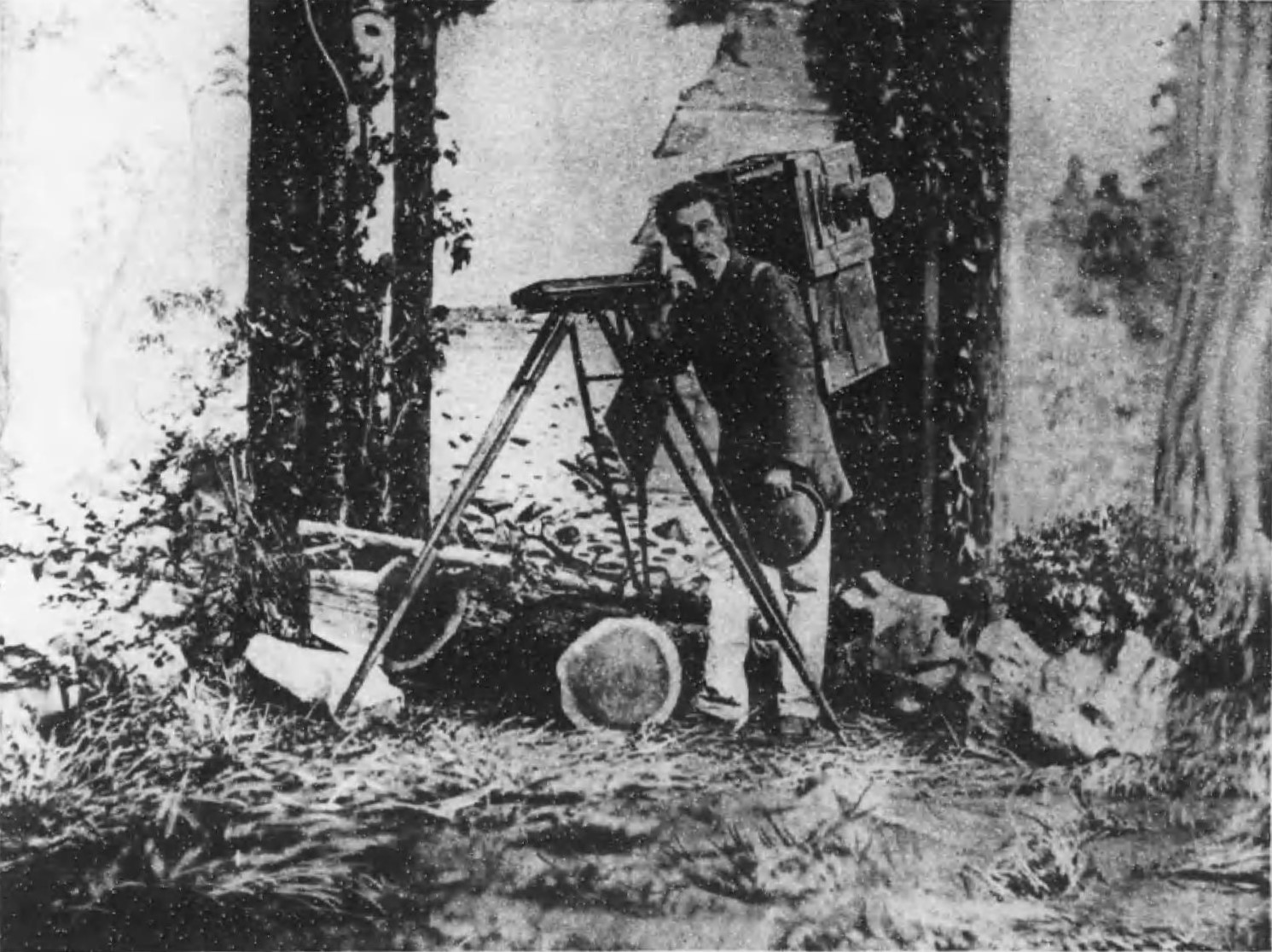
- Born: Sakurada Hisanosuke; March 24, 1823; Shimoda, Shizuoka, Japan
- Died: March 3, 1914 (aged 90)

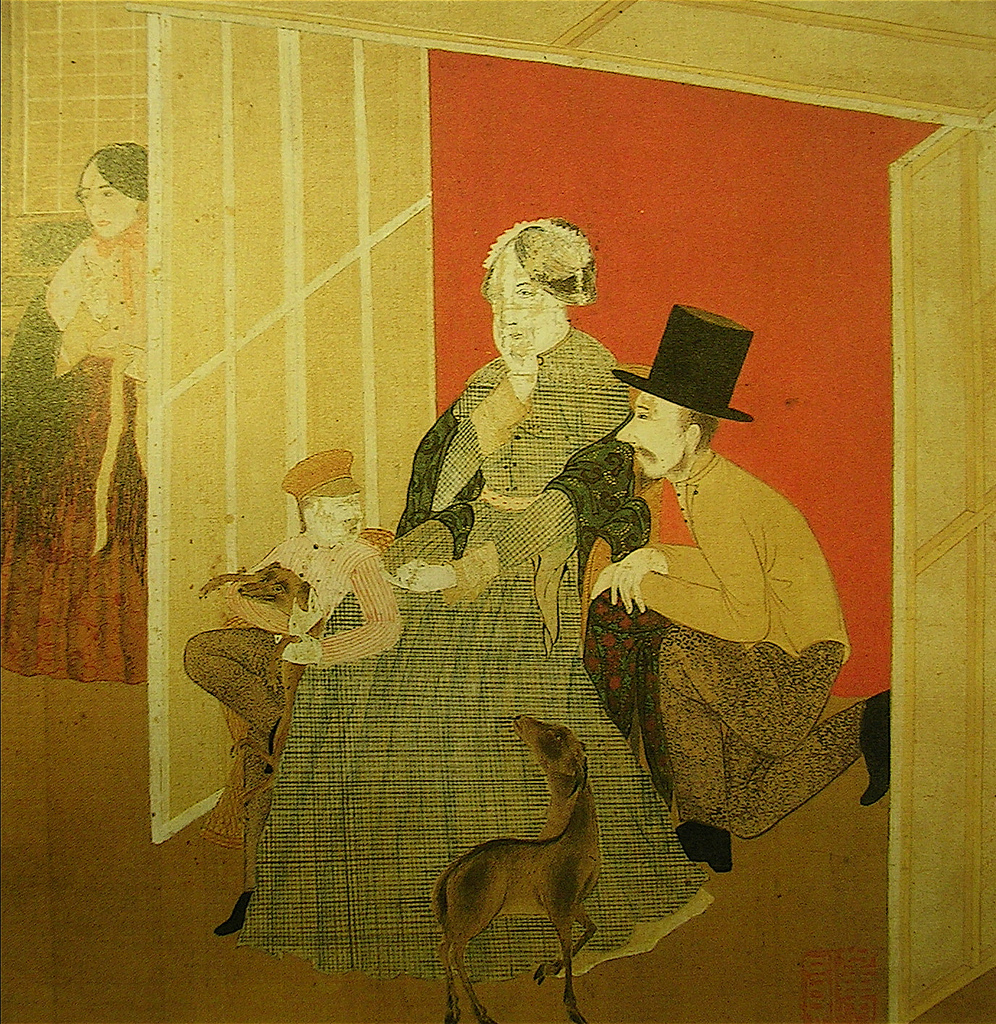
Horanda Fūzoku (Dutch genre picture) around 1863 on silk.

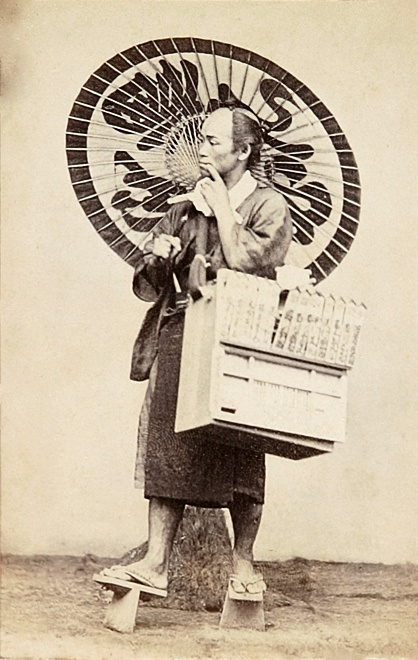
Kowairozukai, ca. 1870

Shimooka Renjō (下岡 蓮杖; March 24, 1823 – March 3, 1914) was a Japanese photographer and was one of the first professional photographers in Japan. He opened the first commercial photography studio in Yokohama, and in Japan he is widely considered the father of Japanese photography.

== Early life ==
He was born with the name Sakurada Hisanosuke in Shimoda on the Izu Peninsula in central Honshū to a samurai family. When he was thirteen years old he moved to Edo (Tokyo) to study painting and serve as an apprentice to a stock merchant. In 1843 he served in the Shimoda artillery battery where he may have been first introduced to daguerreotypes from the Netherlands. However, some accounts say that he was not exposed to photography until he returned to Edo to study art, becoming a student of Kanō Tōsen Nakanobu, a well-established painter in service to the shogunate. These accounts report that he saw a Dutch photograph at the home of a Tokugawa clan member. He began studying photography when he could, and moved to Yokohama in 1859 or 1860 where he would begin his career in photography.

== Photography ==
Renjō acquired his first camera in 1861 from the American photographer John Wilson by trading it for a painting of a panoramic scene. Shortly thereafter he abandoned his studies in painting and pursued photography as a career. He opened a photographic studio in Yokohama in 1862, one of the first in the country. He continued to open studios in the city, primarily focusing on portraiture, and changed his name to Shimooka Renjō in 1865. He taught many photographic students and apprentices before leaving his businesses to his pupils in 1877. He was elected to the Japan Photographic Society in 1893.

=== Significance ===
Renjō’s significance to the history of photography lies in the fact that he helped introduce and spread photography throughout industrializing, Meiji-era Japan. His commercial studio in Yokohama was thought to be the absolute first in the country for many years. Recent discoveries have found that Ukai Gyokusen had opened an ambrotype portrait studio in Edo only a year or two before Renjō opened his studio in 1862. Ueno Hikoma, a chemist, began operating a studio in Nagasaki later the same year. Despite this, Renjō was still one of the nation’s first professional photographers, and one of the most successful. He opened several additional studios and businesses across Yokohama during his career. (Other contemporaries of Renjō included Uchida Kuichi and Shima Kakoku.)

In addition to being a pioneer of the art, Renjō also helped to establish photography in Japan by teaching it to many of his other countrymen. For example, he was the teacher of the great photographer Yokoyama Matsusaburō, starting in 1864. He also taught many other students including: Usui Shusaburo, Esaki Reiji, and Suzuki Shin'ichi I and II . He was honored by the government of Tokyo before his death for his influence, and was elected to join the Japan Photographic Society in 1893.
