= Nakajima Matsuchi =

Japanese photographer

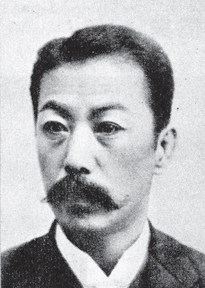
Nakajima Matsuchi

Nakajima Matsuchi (中島 待乳; 1850–1938) was a Japanese photographer. He was taught by Yokoyama Matsusaburō.
