= Shimoda, Shizuoka =

Shimoda 下田市
- City
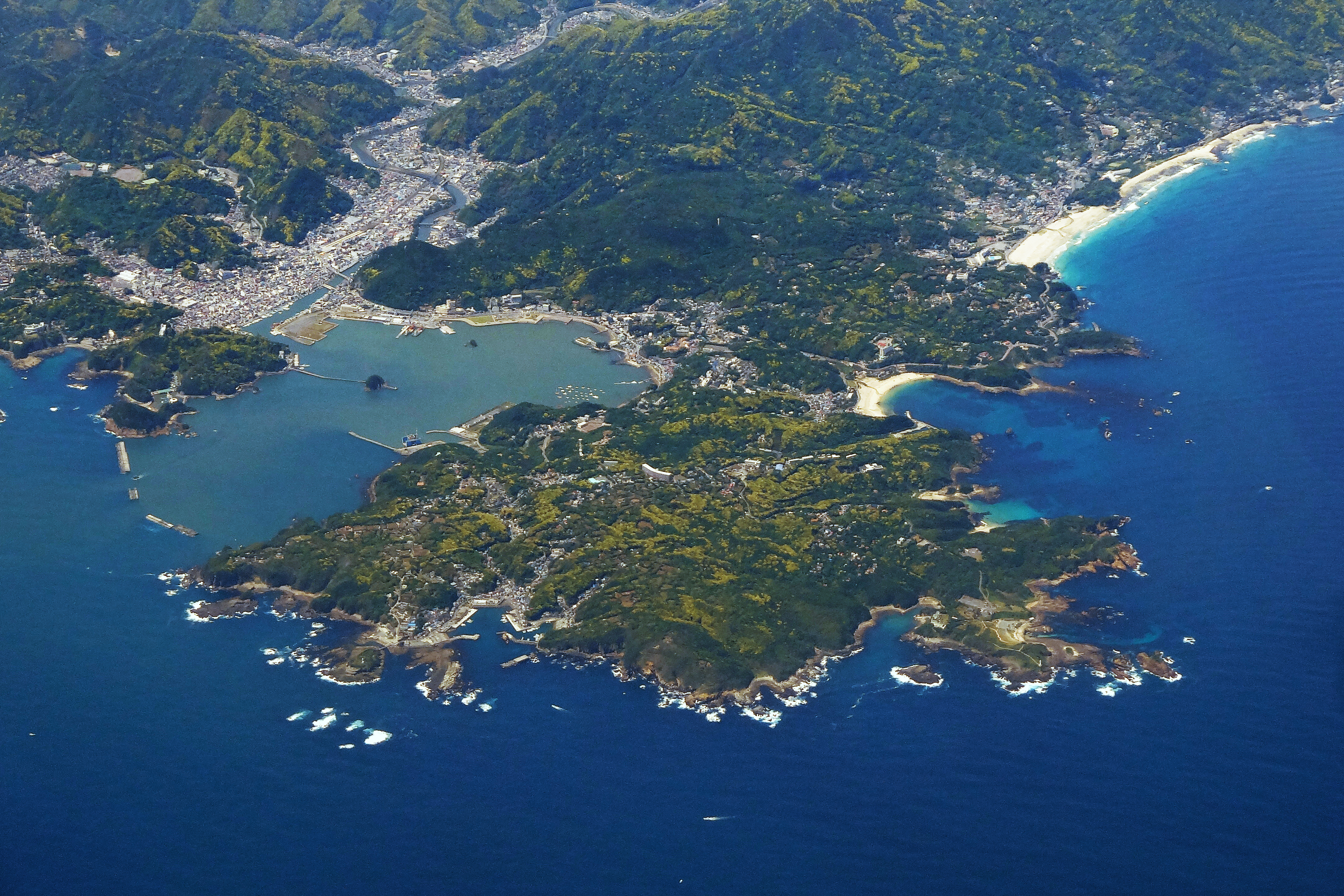

- Flag Seal

- Coordinates: 34°40′46.3″N 138°56′43.1″E
- Country: Japan
- Region: Chūbu (Tōkai)
- Prefecture: Shizuoka

Government
  - Mayor: Shoichiro Matsuki

Area
  - Total: 104.71 km^{2} (40.43 sq mi)

Population (February 2024)
  - Total: 19,670
  - Density: 187.9/km^{2} (486.5/sq mi)
- Time zone: UTC+9 (Japan Standard Time)
- Tree: Oshima Cherry
- Flower: Hydrangea
- Phone number: 0558-22-2211
- Address: 1-5-18, Higashihongō, Shimoda-shi, Shizuoka-ken; 415-8501
- Website: Official website

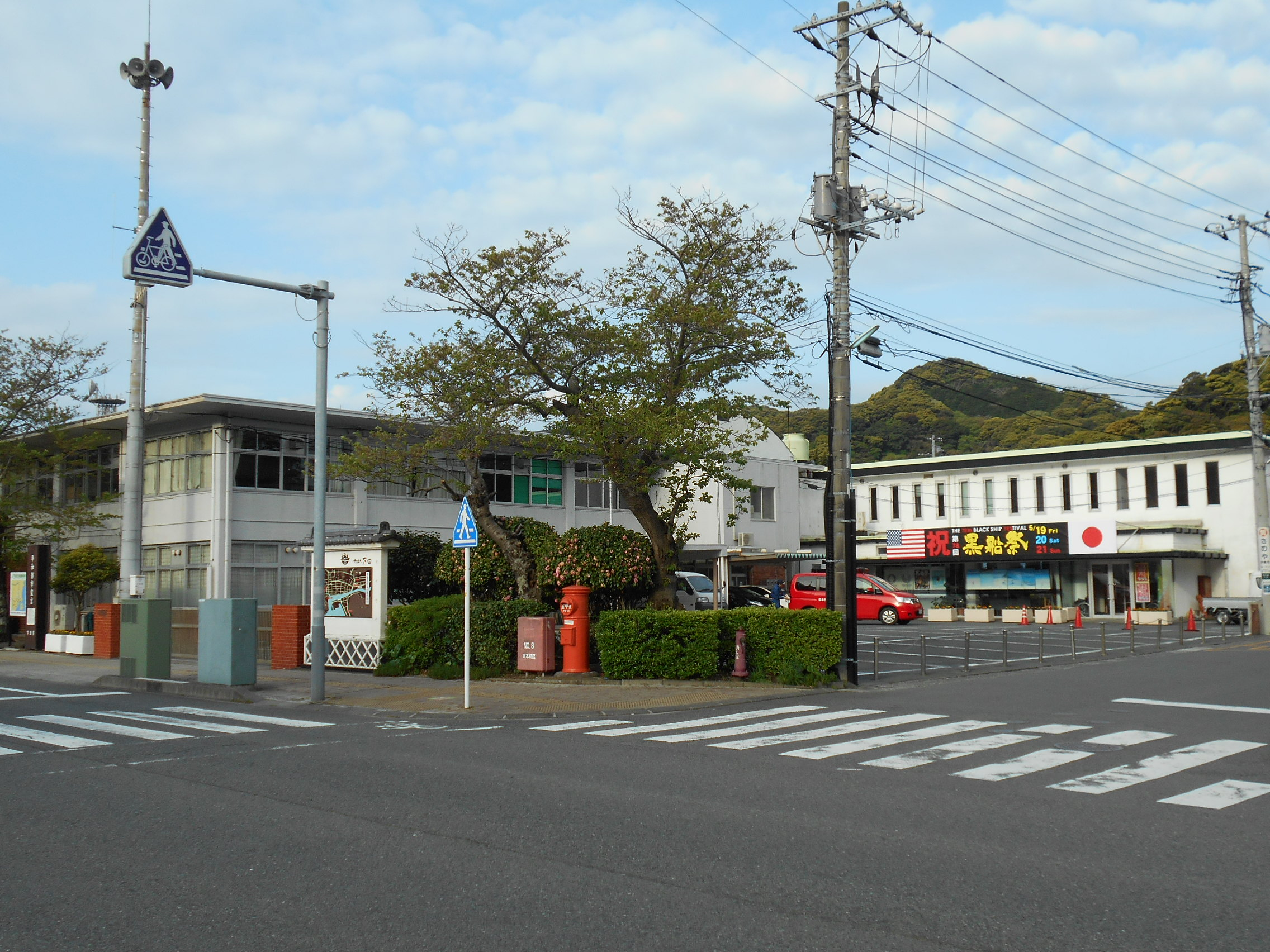
Shimoda City Hall

Shimoda (下田市, Shimoda-shi) is a city and port located in Shizuoka Prefecture, Japan. As of 1 February 2024, the city had an estimated population of 19,670 in 10,436 households, and a population density of 188 persons per square kilometre (490 persons/mi^{2}). The total area of the city is 104.71 square kilometres (40.43 sq mi). In the 1850s, Japan was in political crisis over its increasing inability to maintain its national seclusion policy and the issue of what relations, if any, it should have with foreign powers. For a few years, Shimoda was central to this debate.

== Geography ==
Shimoda is located at the southern tip of the Izu Peninsula about 100 kilometres (62 mi) southwest of Tokyo. Shimoda's location, with the Amagi Mountains to the north, and the warm Kuroshio Current to the south give the city a humid, sub-tropical climate.

=== Surrounding municipalities ===
- Shizuoka Prefecture
  - Kawazu
  - Matsuzaki
  - Minamiizu

== Demographics ==
Per Japanese census data, the population of Shimoda has been in slow decline since 1980.

Historical population
Year	Pop.	±%
1940	24,995	—
1950	28,284	+13.2%
1960	27,387	−3.2%
1970	30,310	+10.7%
1980	31,007	+2.3%
1990	30,081	−3.0%
2000	27,798	−7.6%
2010	25,013	−10.0%

=== Climate ===
The city has a climate characterized by hot and humid summers, and relatively mild winters (Köppen climate classification Cfa). The average annual temperature in Shimoda is 15.5 °C (59.9 °F). The average annual rainfall is 1,159 millimetres (45.6 in) with September as the wettest month. The temperatures are highest on average in August, at around 25.4 °C (77.7 °F), and lowest in January, at around 6.4 °C (43.5 °F).

== History ==
Shimoda has been settled since prehistoric times, with numerous Jōmon period remains found within city limits. It is mentioned in Nara period documents as the location to which Prince Ōtsu was exiled in 686 after his failed rebellion, and in Heian period documents in reference to its iron ore deposits. During the Sengoku period it was controlled by the Odawara Hōjō clan, who built a castle (later destroyed by Toyotomi Hideyoshi). Under the Tokugawa shogunate, Shimoda was tenryō territory directly administered by the shōgun. During the Edo period, Shimoda prospered as a seaport, and was a major port of call for coastal vessels travelling between Osaka and Edo. Until 1721, as a security measure, all vessels were obligated to call at Shimoda before proceeding on to Edo.

=== Treaty port ===
During the Bakumatsu period, Shimoda port was opened to American trade under the conditions of the Convention of Kanagawa, negotiated by Commodore Matthew Perry and signed on March 31, 1854. Shimoda was also the site of Yoshida Shōin's unsuccessful attempt to board Perry's Black Ships in 1854.

The first American Consulate in Japan was opened at the temple of Gyokusen-ji under Consul General Townsend Harris. Harris negotiated the Treaty of Amity and Commerce between the two countries, which was signed at nearby Ryōsen-ji in 1858. Gyokusen-ji is also the location of a small number of foreign graves dating from as early as 1854 marking the final resting place of US forces personnel that died while serving as a part of the Perry Expedition. Japan's relations with Imperial Russia were also negotiated in Shimoda, and in 1855 the Treaty of Shimoda was signed at Chōraku-ji. In June 1859, with the opening of the port of Yokohama to foreign trade, the port of Shimoda was again closed and the American consulate was relocated to Zenpuku-ji in Edo.

After the Meiji Restoration, Shimoda came under the control of the short-lived Kikuma Domain in 1868, and the equally short-lived Ashigara Prefecture from 1871. The Mikomotoshima Lighthouse was completed in 1870 by British engineer Richard Henry Brunton. It is currently the oldest functioning lighthouse in Japan and is now a National Historic Monument. Ashigara Prefecture was divided between Kanagawa and Shizuoka prefectures in 1876. With the establishment of the modern municipalities system in 1889, Shimoda Town was formally established within Kamo District. The town was repeatedly bombed in 1945 in the final stages of World War II.

Shimoda expanded in March 1955 through the merger of six neighboring towns and villages. In 1958, an All Nippon Airways DC-3 en route from Haneda to Nagoya crashed in the sea off Shimoda, killing three passengers. Shimoda suffered damage from sizeable earthquakes in 1974 and in 1978.

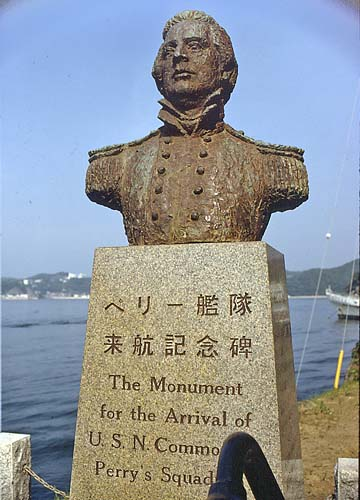
Bust of Matthew C. Perry in Shimoda

== Government ==
Shimoda has a mayor-council form of government with a directly elected mayor and a unicameral city legislature of 13 members. The current mayor is Shoichiro Matsuki, who was elected in 2020.

== Economy ==
The economy of Shimoda is based on tourism (primarily centered on the hot spring resorts and marine sports) and commercial fishing.

== Education ==
Shimoda has seven public elementary schools and four public middle schools operated by the city government and one public high school operated by the Shizuoka Prefectural Board of Education. The prefecture also operates one special education school. Tsukuba University and Nihon University both have marine biology research centers in Shimoda.

== Transportation ==
=== Railway ===
- Izukyu Corporation - Izu Kyūkō Line
  - Izukyū Shimoda Station - Rendaiji Station - Inazusa Station

=== Highway ===
- Izu-Jūkan Expressway
- National Route 135
- National Route 136
- National Route 414

Ferry service is available to Niijima and Shikinejima in the Izu Islands. There used to be a ferry service from Shimoda to Shimizu, Shizuoka; however, it is no longer in operation.

== Local attractions ==
Apart from its role in the opening of Japan, Shimoda is famous for its hot spring resorts and beaches. Tatadohama, Ohama and Iritahama beaches attract many tourists in summer and are popular surfing spots year round, and Iritahama has been voted most beautiful Japanese beach a number of years.

Shimoda is also a setting for much of Yasunari Kawabata's famous short story The Dancing Girl of Izu.

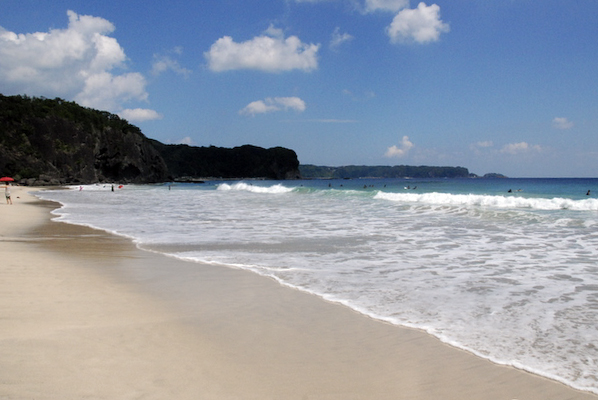
Tatadohama Beach is a sandy beach with the length of approximately 400 metres (440 yd) situated on the south coast of the Izu Peninsula.

Museums in the area include the Uehara Museum of Modern Art.

== Sister cities ==
- Hagi, Yamaguchi, Japan
- Newport, Rhode Island, United States
- Numata, Gunma, Japan

== Notable people from Shimoda ==
- Harumi Kurihara, Television personality.
- Michiko Matsumoto, Photographer.
- Shimooka Renjō, Photographer.
- Okichi Saito, geisha, famous for her tragic story.

== In popular media ==
The Japanese anime television series Natsuiro Kiseki is set in Shimoda.

Pallet Town from the Japanese game series Pokémon is geographically placed in the real-world location of Shimoda City, although the fictional town is inspired by creator Satoshi Tajiri’s own hometown of Machida, Tokyo.
