= The Far East (periodical) =

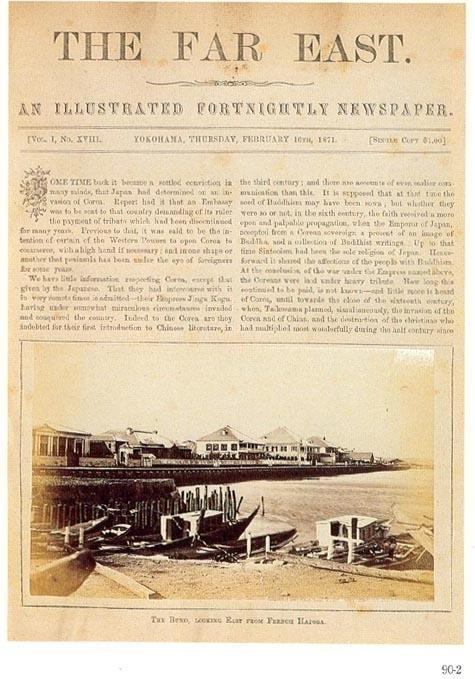
Front page of The Far East, 16 February 1871

The Far East was a newsmagazine published by J. R. Black in Yokohama, Japan between 1870 and 1878. The periodical was illustrated with original, pasted-in photographs, at a time when photomechanical reproduction was still in its infancy. During its run, The Far East published approximately 750 photographs, mostly of Japan and China, by at least 20 different photographers.

Before J. R. Black began publication of The Far East, he had been partner in and editor of the Japan Herald, the first English-language newspaper in Japan. When that newspaper declared bankruptcy in 1867, Black founded his own newspaper, the Japan Gazette, which offered coverage of the reform movements of the Bakumatsu. He then founded The Far East, in 1870, with a view to promoting "goodwill and brotherhood between the outer world and the subjects of the most ancient imperial dynasty of the world". The first issue appeared on 30 May 1870.

The in-house photographer for The Far East was the Austrian, Michael Moser, but Black, an amateur photographer himself, supplemented Moser's images with his own. Significant photographers whose work also appeared in the newspaper included Uchida Kuichi, the elder Suzuki Shin'ichi, and William Saunders.

The Far East began as a fortnightly publication, then, between June 1873 and October 1875, it was published monthly, and from 1876, publication was irregular. In 1874, subscription prices were $4 quarterly, $7 semi-annually, and $13 annually. By 1876, in response to increased circulation, the prices were slightly reduced.

From 1876, The Far East was published in Shanghai, where J. R. Black had settled. Accordingly, the photographic subjects appearing in the newspaper were now predominantly Chinese. By that year, the circulation was probably in the order of 300 readers, and between 1876 and 1878 the maximum circulation was probably between 500 and 1000 readers. There is no evidence of further publication of The Far East after December 1878.
