= Yokoyama Matsusaburō =

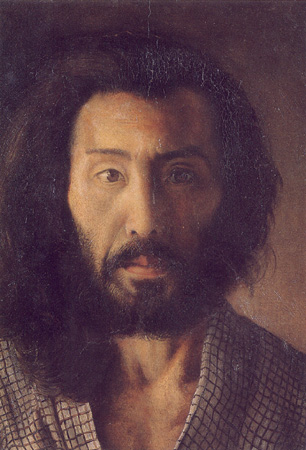
- Self-portrait, Yokoyama Matsusaburō. A shashin abura-e, made between 1881 and 1884.
- Born: 1838
- Died: 1884 (aged 45–46); Tokyo, Japan
- Known for: Photography

Yokoyama Matsusaburō (横山 松三郎; 1838–1884) was a pioneering Japanese photographer, artist, lithographer and teacher.

Yokoyama was born Yokoyama Bunroku (横山 文六) in Iturup (then under Japanese control) on 10 October 1838. Early in his life, Yokoyama and his family moved to Hakodate, where in 1854 he was first exposed to photography on seeing daguerreotypes by Eliphalet Brown, Jr. and A. F. Mozhaiskii. At the age of fifteen he was apprenticed to a kimono dealer, and during this time developed an interest in painting. A few years later, as an assistant to the Russian painter Lehman, he was exposed to Western painting styles and helped sketch the surroundings of the Russian Consulate in Hakodate. With a view to improving his landscape painting, Yokoyama started to learn photography. He travelled to Yokohama and studied photography under Shimooka Renjō, then returned to Hakodate and studied under the Russian consul, I. A. Goshkevich. In 1868 Yokoyama opened his own commercial photographic studio in Yokohama. That same year he moved his studio to Ryōgoku (in Tokyo), naming it Tsūten-rō (通天楼); some time later, he moved Tsūten-rō a short distance to Ueno Ikenohata).

In 1868, Yokoyama met Ninagawa Noritane, an official in the Meiji government, who commissioned him to photograph Edo Castle, before its imminent reconstruction, and the Imperial treasures housed in the Shōsōin. The project was completed between 1871 and 1872 and some of the resulting work was published in 1872 as an album of 64 photographs titled Kyū-Edo-jō Shashin-chō (旧江戸城写真帳, Photograph Album of the former Edo Castle) and republished as an album of 73 photographs in 1878 under the title Kanko Zusetsu, Jokakau-no-bu (History and description of Japanese arts and industries, part one, the castle). Some of Yokoyama's photographs of Japanese art works were presented at the 1873 Vienna Exposition.

Yokoyama was the first Japanese photographer to seriously pursue stereographic photography. An early photograph of his studio equipment shows seven cameras, of which two are stereographic. By 1869 Yokoyama, accompanied by friends and students, was travelling throughout Japan to make stereoviews. He produced at least three series of views that were published at the time, but that are now very hard to find. According to photography historian Rob Oechsle, Yokoyama's are the only notable Japanese-made stereographic series from the early Meiji period; they were taken from 1869 through the 1870s.

In 1870, Shimooka Renjō invited Yokoyama to join him in photographing Mount Nikkō-Shirane. The resulting photographs, under both their names, were subsequently presented to the Tokugawa clan.

Yokoyama opened an art school in 1873 whose students included such painters as Kamei Shiichi, Kamei Takejiro and Yamada Nariaki, and such photographers as Azusawa Ryōichi, Kikuchi Shingaku, Nakajima Matsuchi, and Suzuki Shin'ichi.

In 1876, he gave the rights to his studio to his assistant Oda Nobumasa and became a lecturer at the Japanese Military Academy, lecturing on photography and lithography.

In 1881, a recurrence of his tuberculosis, first caught around the age of fifteen, forced him to leave his post at the Military Academy. Nevertheless, he then founded the Shashin Sekiban-sha (Photolithography Company), he continued to paint, and about this time he created what he called shashin abura-e (寫眞油繪 in the orthography of the time, 写真油絵 now) or "photographic oil-paintings", in which the paper support of a photograph was cut away and oil paints then applied to the remaining emulsion. Yokoyama produced a number of works using this technique.

Yokoyama died in Tokyo on 15 October 1884.

In addition to his landscapes and portraits, Yokoyama is noted for his self-portraits, and his works include paintings, large format albumen prints (monochrome and hand-coloured), and shashin abura-e. He produced studio souvenir albums, some of which have survived to this day. A biography of Yokoyama was written in 1887.
