= Delamotte =

Delamotte may refer to:

- Champagne Delamotte, a small producer of champagne
- Philip Henry Delamotte (1821–1889), British photographer and illustrator
- William Alfred Delamotte (1775–1863), British painter and engraver
