= Transbordeur =

Journal of photographic history

Transbordeur: photographie histoire société
- Discipline: History of photography
- Language: French
- Edited by: Christian Joschke, Olivier Lugon

Publication details
- History: 2017–present
- Publisher: Éditions Macula
- Frequency: Annual

Standard abbreviations
- ISO 4: Transbordeur

Indexing
- ISSN: 2552-9137
- OCLC no.: 1120482436

Links
- Journal homepage

Transbordeur is a peer-reviewed academic journal devoted to the history of photography. Published in French by Éditions Macula, its aim is an appraisal of the full extent and diversity of photography’s impact on history and society. Transbordeur includes work in the fields of history of photography, art, media, architecture and social science.

== Editors-in-chief ==
- Christian Joschke (Paris Nanterre University): 2017 – present
- Olivier Lugon (University of Lausanne): 2017 – present
