= William Alfred Delamotte =

English painter (1775–1863)

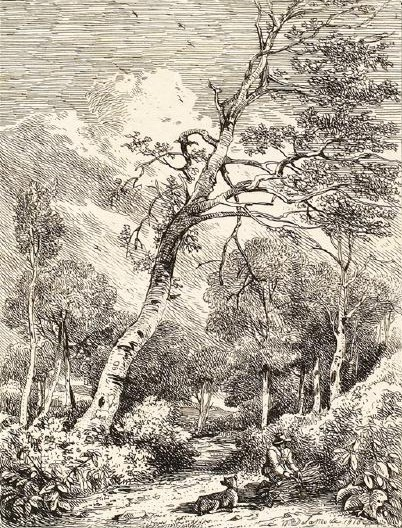
Man Gathering Faggots With A Dog (1816)

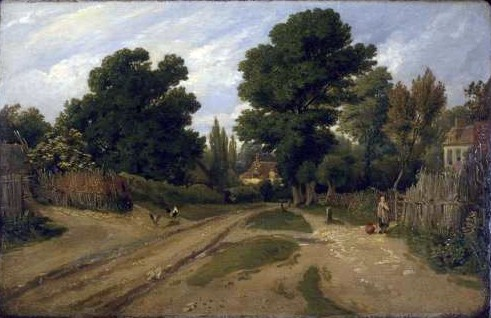
Waterperry, Oxfordshire (1803)

William Alfred Delamotte (Weymouth 1775 – 1863 Oxford), was an English painter and printmaker.

== Life ==
Delamotte was the son of a French refugee. His remarkable drawing skills were apparent from an early age, so that he enjoyed the royal patronage of King George III. After having exhibited at the Royal Academy in 1793, he enrolled at the Royal Academy Schools the following year, becoming a student of Benjamin West, another of the King's protégés and President of the Royal Academy. Even during these years of study, Delamotte chose to turn his attention to architectural and landscape work.

From the Academy he moved to Oxford, depicting its buildings in numerous sketches. Many of his drawings were made into woodcuts by Orlando Jewitt of Headington.

In 1803 he accepted the post of drawing-master at the newly established Royal Military College, Sandhurst, a position he held for forty years.

Besides producing watercolours and a few oils, he turned to printmaking by way of etching, lithography and soft-ground etching.

== Family ==
He was the brother of George Orleans Delamotte, landscape artist and teacher. One of his sons, Philip Henry Delamotte (1821–1889), was a noted photographer and illustrator, and became Professor of Drawing and Fine Art at King's College London. Another son, William Alfred Delamotte junior (1806–1872), was a botanical and scientific illustrator, and lithographer.

William Alfred Delamotte senior died in Oxford at the age of 88 on 13 March 1863 and is buried in St Sepulchre's Cemetery there.
