= History of photography =

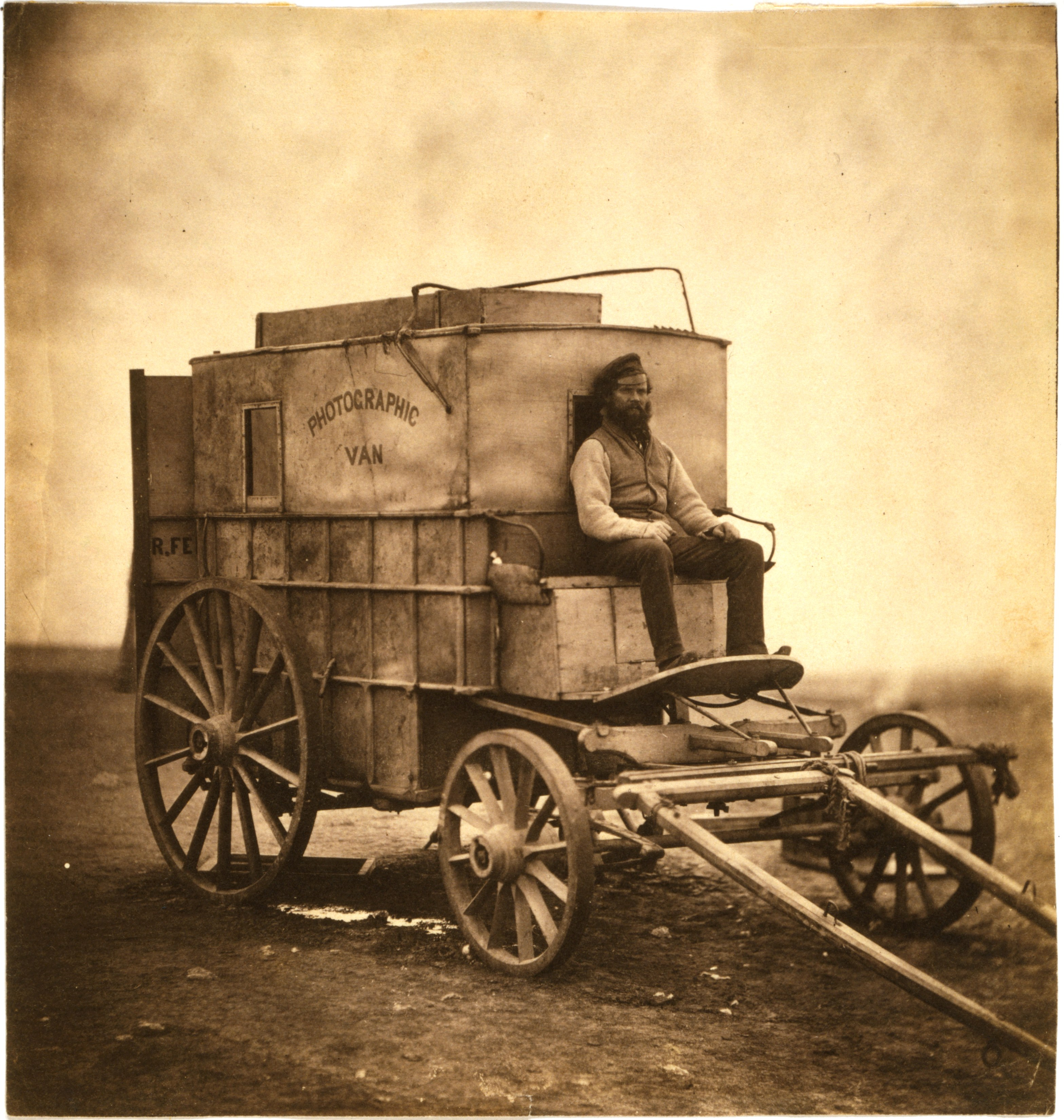
A salted paper print taken by Roger Fenton of his assistant and photographic wagon, 1855

The history of photography began with the discovery of two critical principles: The first is camera obscura image projection; the second is the discovery that some substances are visibly altered by exposure to light. There are no artifacts or descriptions that indicate any attempt to capture images with light-sensitive materials prior to the 18th century.

Around 1718, Johann Heinrich Schulze used a light-sensitive slurry to capture images of cut-out letters on a bottle. However, he did not pursue making these results permanent. Around 1800, Thomas Wedgwood made the first reliably documented, although unsuccessful attempt at capturing camera images in permanent form. His experiments did produce detailed photograms, but Wedgwood and his associate Humphry Davy found no way to fix these images.

In 1826 or 1827, Nicéphore Niépce first managed to fix an image that was captured with a camera, but at least eight hours or even several days of exposure in the camera were required and the earliest results were very crude. Niépce's associate Louis Daguerre went on to develop the daguerreotype process, the first publicly announced and commercially viable photographic process. The daguerreotype required only minutes of exposure in the camera, and produced clear, finely detailed results. On August 2, 1839, Daguerre demonstrated the details of the process to the Chamber of Peers in Paris. On August 19 the technical details were made public in a meeting of the Academy of Sciences and the Academy of Fine Arts in the Palace of Institute. When the metal based daguerreotype process was demonstrated formally to the public, the competitor approach of paper-based calotype negative and salt print processes invented by Henry Fox Talbot was already demonstrated in London (but with less publicity). Subsequent innovations made photography easier and more versatile. New materials reduced the required camera exposure time from minutes to seconds, and eventually to a small fraction of a second; new photographic media were more economical, sensitive or convenient. Since the 1850s, the collodion process with its glass-based photographic plates combined the high quality known from the Daguerreotype with the multiple print options known from the calotype and was commonly used for decades. Roll films popularized casual use by amateurs. In the mid-20th century, developments made it possible for amateurs to take pictures in natural color as well as in black-and-white.

The commercial arrival of digital cameras in the 1990s revolutionized photography. During the first decade of the 21st century, film declined as digital cameras became cheaper, easier to use, and better in image quality. Once cameras became standard on smartphones, taking photos and posting them online became an ordinary part of daily life around the world.

== Etymology ==
The coining of the word photography is usually attributed to Sir John Herschel in 1839. It is based on the Greek φῶς (phōs; genitive phōtos), meaning "light", and γραφή (graphê), meaning "drawing, writing", together meaning "drawing of light".

== Early history of the camera ==
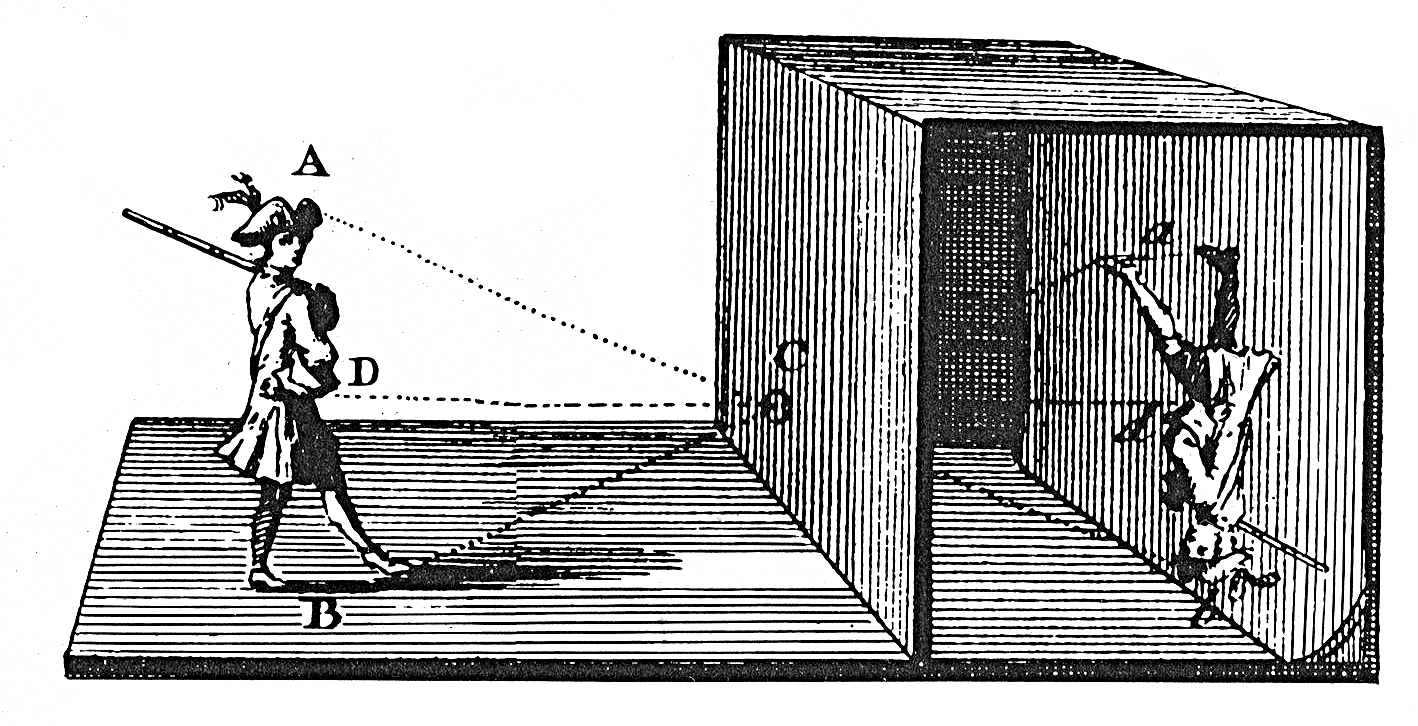
Principle of the camera obscura

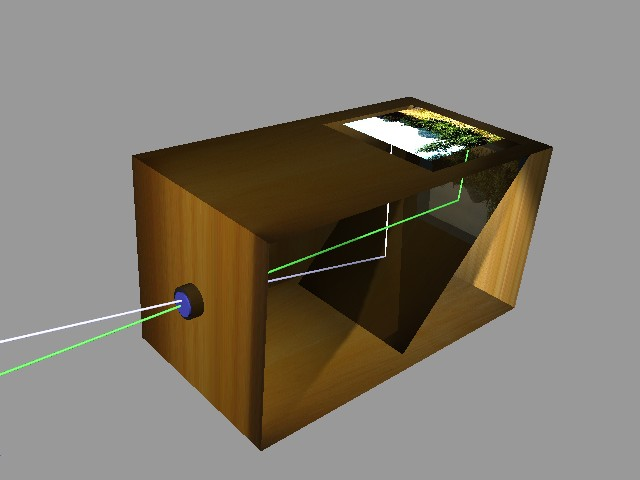
Principle of a box camera obscura with mirror

A natural phenomenon, known as camera obscura or pinhole image, can project a (reversed) image through a small opening onto an opposite surface. This principle may have been known and used in prehistoric times. The earliest known written record of the camera obscura is to be found in the 4th century BCE, in two different places in parallel: by Aristotle in Greece and by Mozi in China. Alhazen (or Ibn al-Haytham) is said to be the first that actually built a camera obscura. Until the 16th century the camera obscura was mainly used to study optics and astronomy, especially to safely watch solar eclipses without damaging the eyes. In the later half of the 16th century some technical improvements were developed: a biconvex lens in the opening (first described by Gerolamo Cardano in 1550) and a diaphragm restricting the aperture (Daniel Barbaro in 1568) gave a brighter and sharper image. In 1558 Giambattista della Porta was the first to write a description of using the camera obscura as a drawing aid in his popular and influential books. Della Porta's proposal was widely adopted by artists and since the 17th century portable versions of the camera obscura were commonly used—first as a tent, later as boxes.

The box type camera obscura was the basis for photographic cameras, as used in the earliest attempts to capture natural images in light sensitive materials. This was the first step in the path that Walter Benjamin described in The Work of Art in the Age of Mechanical Reproduction.

=== Physiognotrace ===
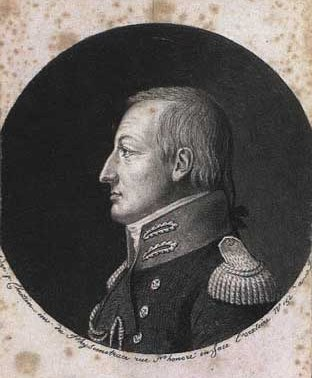
Physiognotrace of Hans Lindholm by Gilles-Louis Chrétien

A physiognotrace is an instrument used to create a semi-automated portrait. It was invented in the 18th century and was abandoned when light-sensitive materials were discovered. It was popular for several decades. The sitter sat in a wooden frame and turned to the side to pose. A pantograph connected to a pencil produced a contour line on a plate within a few minutes.

=== Camera lucida ===
Camera-lucida-scheme

A camera lucida is an optical device used as a drawing aid by artists. The camera lucida projects an optical image of the subject being viewed, on the surface upon which the artist is drawing. The artist sees both scene and drawing surface simultaneously, as in a photographic double exposure. This allows the artist to duplicate key points of the scene on the drawing surface, thus aiding in the accurate rendering of perspective.

== Light-sensitive materials ==
=== Fixing ===
Note: In the process discussed here, the "Fixing" step is mentioned. This is a step in the negative development process as well as in the chemical printing process. (Of course not required in digital printing). At this stage, all remaining light-sensitive materials are removed so that the product (film or print) can be exposed to light without the image being further affected by the light.

=== Before 1700: Light-sensitive materials ===
The notion that light can affect various substances—for instance, the sun tanning of skin or fading of textile—must have been around since very early times. Ideas of fixing the images seen in mirrors or other ways of creating images automatically may also have been in people's minds long before anything like photography was developed. However, there seem to be no historical records of any ideas even remotely resembling photography before 1700, despite early knowledge of light-sensitive materials and the camera obscura.

In 1614 Angelo Sala noted that sunlight will turn powdered silver nitrate black, and that paper wrapped around silver nitrate for a year will turn black.

Wilhelm Homberg described how light darkened some chemicals in 1694.

== 1700 to 1802: earliest concepts and fleeting photogram results ==
=== Schulze's Scotophors: earliest fleeting letter photograms (circa 1717) ===
Around 1717, German polymath Johann Heinrich Schulze accidentally discovered that a slurry of chalk and nitric acid into which some silver particles had been dissolved was darkened by sunlight. After experiments with threads that had created lines on the bottled substance after he placed it in direct sunlight for a while, he applied stencils of words to the bottle. The stencils produced copies of the text in dark red, almost violet characters on the surface of the otherwise whitish contents. The impressions persisted until they were erased by shaking the bottle or until overall exposure to light obliterated them. Schulze named the substance "Scotophors" when he published his findings in 1719. He thought the discovery could be applied to detect whether metals or minerals contained any silver and hoped that further experimentation by others would lead to some other useful results. Schulze's process resembled later photogram techniques and is sometimes regarded as the very first form of photography.

=== De la Roche's fictional image capturing process (1760) ===
The early science fiction novel Giphantie (1760) by the Frenchman Tiphaigne de la Roche described something quite similar to (color) photography, a process that fixes fleeting images formed by rays of light: "They coat a piece of canvas with this material, and place it in front of the object to capture. The first effect of this cloth is similar to that of a mirror, but by means of its viscous nature the prepared canvas, as is not the case with the mirror, retains a facsimile of the image. The mirror represents images faithfully, but retains none; our canvas reflects them no less faithfully, but retains them all. This impression of the image is instantaneous. The canvas is then removed and deposited in a dark place. An hour later the impression is dry, and you have a picture the more precious in that no art can imitate its truthfulness." De la Roche thus imagined a process that made use of a special substance in combination with the qualities of a mirror, rather than the camera obscura. The dark place in which the pictures dried suggests that he thought about the light sensitivity of the material, but he attributed the effect to its viscous nature.

=== Scheele's forgotten chemical fixer (1777) ===
In 1777, the chemist Carl Wilhelm Scheele was studying the more intrinsically light-sensitive silver chloride and determined that light darkened it by disintegrating it into microscopic dark particles of metallic silver. Of greater potential usefulness, Scheele found that ammonia dissolved the silver chloride, but not the dark particles. This discovery could have been used to stabilize or "fix" a camera image captured with silver chloride, but was not picked up by the earliest photography experimenters.

Scheele also noted that red light did not have much effect on silver chloride, a phenomenon that would later be applied in photographic darkrooms as a method of seeing black-and-white prints without harming their development.

Although Thomas Wedgwood felt inspired by Scheele's writings in general, he must have missed or forgotten these experiments; he found no method to fix the photogram and shadow images he managed to capture around 1800 (see below).

=== Elizabeth Fulhame and the effect of light on "Silver Salts" (1794) ===
Elizabeth Fulhame's book An essay on combustion described her experiments of the effects of light on silver salts. She is better known for her discovery of what is now called catalysis, but Larry J. Schaaf in his history of photography considered her work on silver chemistry to represent a major step in the development of photography.

=== Thomas Wedgwood and Humphry Davy: Fleeting detailed photograms (1790–1802) ===
English photographer and inventor Thomas Wedgwood is believed to have been the first person to have thought of creating permanent pictures by capturing camera images on material coated with a light-sensitive chemical. He originally wanted to capture the images of a camera obscura, but found they were too faint to have an effect upon the silver nitrate solution that was recommended to him as a light-sensitive substance. Wedgwood did manage to copy painted glass plates and captured shadows on white leather, as well as on paper moistened with a silver nitrate solution. Attempts to preserve the results with their "distinct tints of brown or black, sensibly differing in intensity" failed. It is unclear when Wedgwood's experiments took place. He may have started before 1790; James Watt wrote a letter to Thomas Wedgwood's father Josiah Wedgwood to thank him "for your instructions as to the Silver Pictures, about which, when at home, I will make some experiments". This letter (now lost) is believed to have been written in 1790, 1791 or 1799. In 1802, an account by Humphry Davy detailing Wedgwood's experiments was published in an early journal of the Royal Institution with the title An Account of a Method of Copying Paintings upon Glass, and of Making Profiles, by the Agency of Light upon Nitrate of Silver. Davy added that the method could be used for objects that are partly opaque and partly transparent to create accurate representations of, for instance, "the woody fibres of leaves and the wings of insects". He also found that solar microscope images of small objects were easily captured on prepared paper. Davy, apparently unaware or forgetful of Scheele's discovery, concluded that substances should be found to eliminate (or deactivate) the unexposed particles in silver nitrate or silver chloride "to render the process as useful as it is elegant". Wedgwood may have prematurely abandoned his experiments because of his frail and failing health. He died at age 34 in 1805.

Davy seems not to have continued the experiments. Although the journal of the nascent Royal Institution probably reached its very small group of members, the article must have been read eventually by many more people. It was reviewed by David Brewster in the Edinburgh Magazine in December 1802, appeared in chemistry textbooks as early as 1803, was translated into French and was published in German in 1811. Readers of the article may have been discouraged to find a fixer, because the highly acclaimed scientist Davy had already tried and failed. Apparently the article was not noted by Niépce or Daguerre, and by Talbot only after he had developed his own processes.

=== Jacques Charles: Fleeting silhouette photograms (circa 1801) ===
French balloonist, professor and inventor Jacques Charles is believed to have captured fleeting negative photograms of silhouettes on light-sensitive paper at the start of the 19th century, prior to Wedgwood. Charles died in 1823 without having documented the process, but purportedly demonstrated it in his lectures at the Louvre. It was not publicized until François Arago mentioned it at his introduction of the details of the daguerreotype to the world in 1839. He later wrote that the first idea of fixing the images of the camera obscura or the solar microscope with chemical substances belonged to Charles. Later historians probably only built on Arago's information, and, much later, the unsupported year 1780 was attached to it. As Arago indicated the first years of the 19th century and a date prior to the 1802 publication of Wedgwood's process, this would mean that Charles' demonstrations took place in 1800 or 1801, assuming that Arago was this accurate almost 40 years later.

== 1816 to 1833: Niépce's earliest fixed images ==
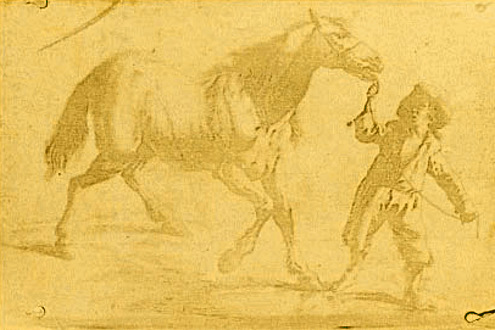
Nicéphore Niépce's 1822 heliographic photocopy of an engraving.

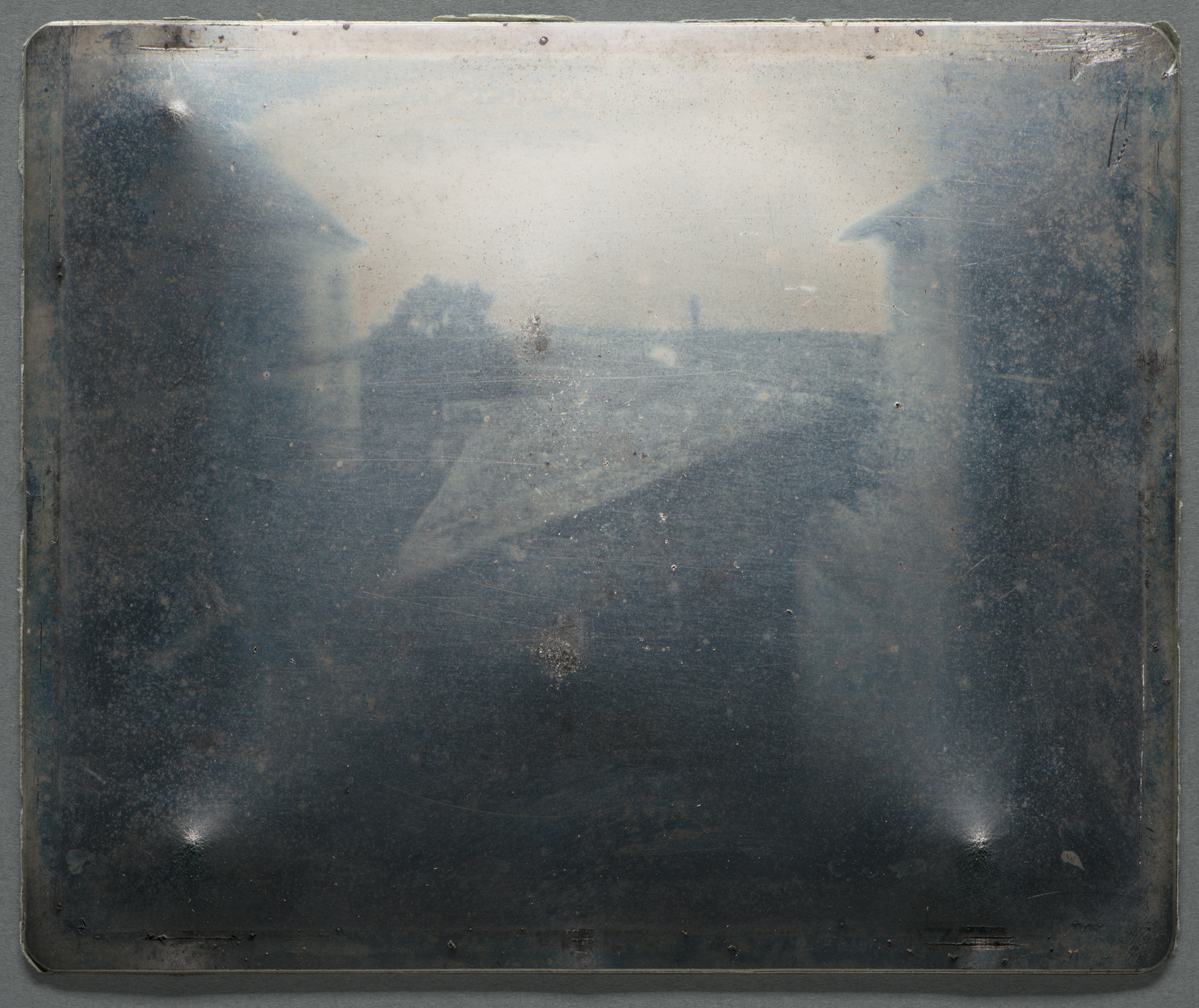
The original heliographic plate of Niépce's view at Le Gras (1827), showing rooftops visible from a second-story bedroom window

Nicéphore Niépce was a French aristocrat, scientist, and chemist. His family fortune allowed him to engage in inventions and scientific research. In 1816, using paper coated with silver chloride, he succeeded in photographing the images formed in a small camera, but the photographs were negatives, darkest where the camera image was lightest and vice versa, and they were not permanent in the sense of being reasonably light-fast; like earlier experimenters, Niépce could find no way to prevent the coating from darkening all over when it was exposed to light for viewing. Disenchanted with silver salts, he turned his attention to light-sensitive organic substances.

The oldest surviving photograph of the image formed in a camera was created by Niépce in 1826 or 1827, the photograph was called "View from the Window at Le Gras". It was made on a polished sheet of pewter and the light-sensitive substance was a thin coating of bitumen, a naturally occurring petroleum tar, which was dissolved in lavender oil, applied to the surface of the pewter and allowed to dry before use. After a very long exposure in the camera (traditionally said to be eight hours, but now believed to be several days), the bitumen was sufficiently hardened in proportion to its exposure to light that the unhardened part could be removed with a solvent, leaving a positive image with the light areas represented by hardened bitumen and the dark areas by bare pewter. To see the image plainly, the plate had to be lit and viewed in such a way that the bare metal appeared dark and the bitumen relatively light.

In partnership, Niépce in Chalon-sur-Saône and Louis Daguerre in Paris refined the bitumen process, substituting a more sensitive resin and a very different post-exposure treatment that yielded higher-quality and more easily viewed images. Exposure times in the camera, although substantially reduced, were still measured in hours.

== 1832 to 1840: Early monochrome processes ==
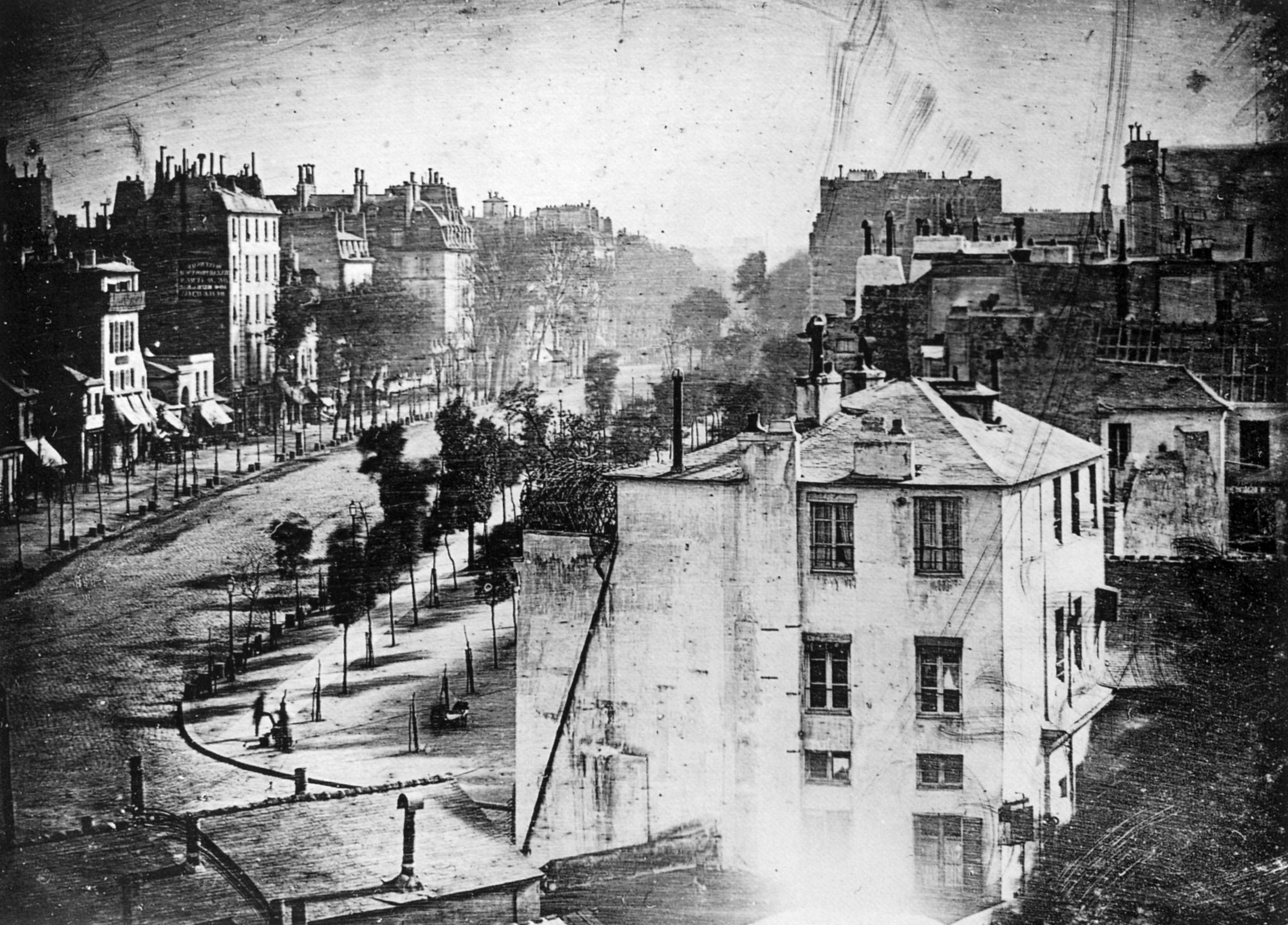
The Boulevard du Temple, Louis Daguerre's 1838 daguerreotype of a busy street, with only one man remaining in one place long enough to be clearly visible (near the bottom left corner).

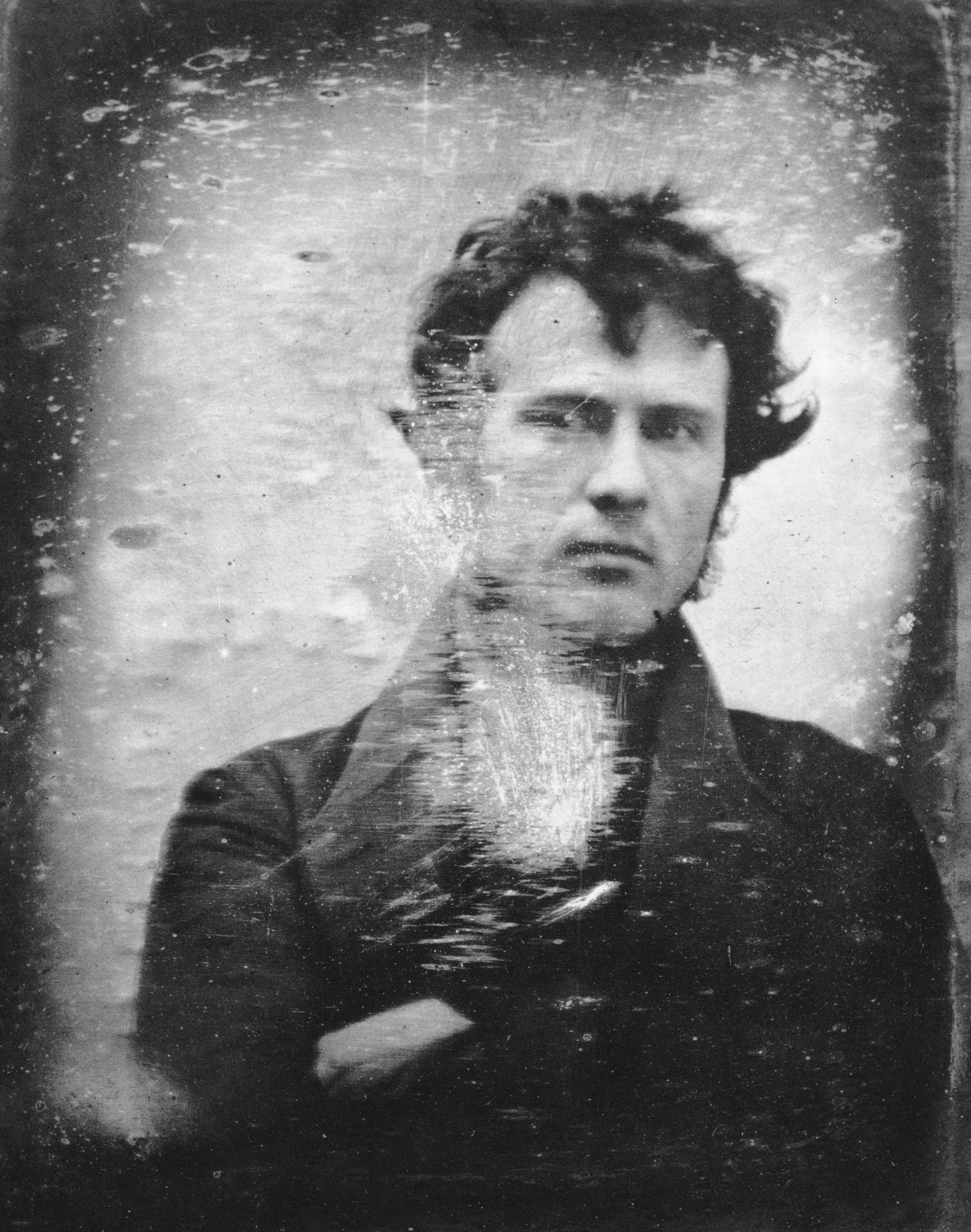
Self portrait of American photographer Robert Cornelius, probably October or November 1839, an approximately quarter plate size daguerreotype.

Niépce died suddenly in 1833, leaving his notes to Daguerre. More interested in silver-based processes than Niépce had been, Daguerre experimented with photographing camera images directly onto a mirror-like silver-surfaced plate that had been fumed with iodine vapor, which reacted with the silver to form a coating of silver iodide. As with the bitumen process, the result appeared as a positive when it was suitably lit and viewed. Exposure times were still impractically long until Daguerre made the pivotal discovery that an invisibly slight or "latent" image produced on such a plate by a much shorter exposure could be "developed" to full visibility by mercury fumes. This brought the required exposure time down to a few minutes under optimum conditions. A strong hot solution of common salt served to stabilize or fix the image by removing the remaining silver iodide. On 7 January 1839, this first complete practical photographic process was announced at a meeting of the French Academy of Sciences, and the news quickly spread. At first, all details of the process were withheld and specimens were shown only at Daguerre's studio, under his close supervision, to Academy members and other distinguished guests. Arrangements were made for the French government to buy the rights in exchange for pensions for Niépce's son and Daguerre and to present the invention to the world (with the exception of Great Britain, where an agent for Daguerre patented it) as a free gift. Complete instructions were made public on 19 August 1839. Known as the daguerreotype process, it was the most common commercial process until the late 1850s when it was superseded by the collodion process.

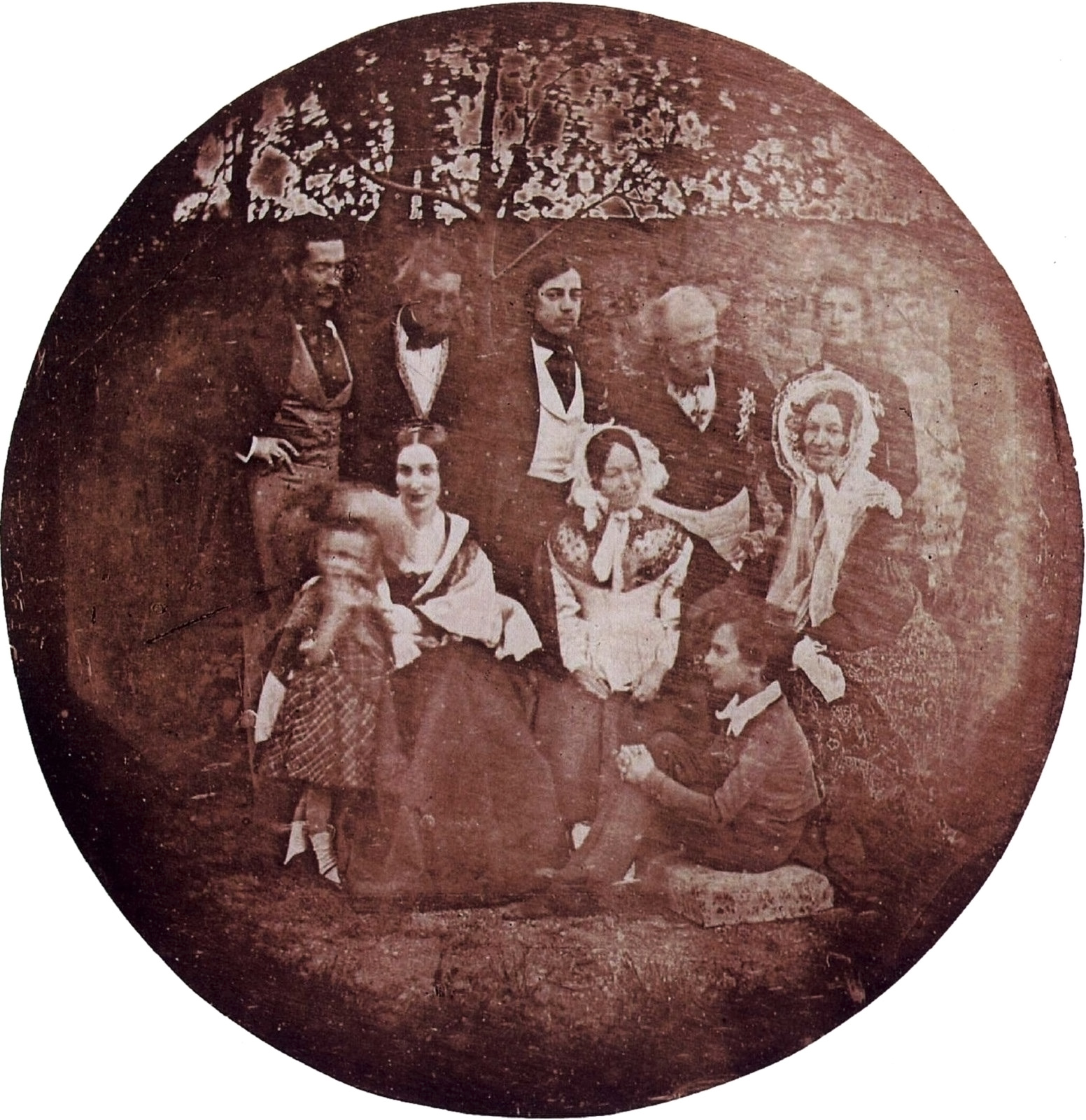
An early European attempt at daguerreotype portraiture. Count Karel Chotek with his family, 3 or 4 November 1839. Possibly by Carl August von Steinheil.

French-born Hércules Florence developed his own photographic technique in 1832 or 1833 in Brazil, with some help of pharmacist Joaquim Corrêa de Mello (1816–1877). Looking for another method to copy graphic designs he captured their images on paper treated with silver nitrate as contact prints or in a camera obscura device. He did not manage to properly fix his images and abandoned the project after hearing of the Daguerreotype process in 1839 and did not properly publish any of his findings. He reportedly referred to the technique as "photographie" (in French) as early as 1833, also helped by a suggestion of De Mello. Some extant photographic contact prints are believed to have been made in circa 1833 and kept in the collection of IMS.

Henry Fox Talbot had already succeeded in creating stabilized photographic negatives on paper in 1835, but worked on perfecting his own process after reading early reports of Daguerre's invention. In early 1839, he acquired a key improvement, an effective fixer, from his friend John Herschel, a polymath scientist who had previously shown that hyposulfite of soda (commonly called "hypo" and now known formally as sodium thiosulfate) would dissolve silver salts. News of this solvent also benefited Daguerre, who soon adopted it as a more efficient alternative to his original hot salt water method.

In 1837, mineralist-writer Franz von Kobell shot finely detailed salt-paper negatives of different perspectives of the Munich Frauenkirche and other local buildings. Kobell revealed his work in 1839, together with Carl August von Steinheil. The "Steinheil method" produced pictures with a diameter of 4 cm, and negatives were rephotographed to create positive versions.

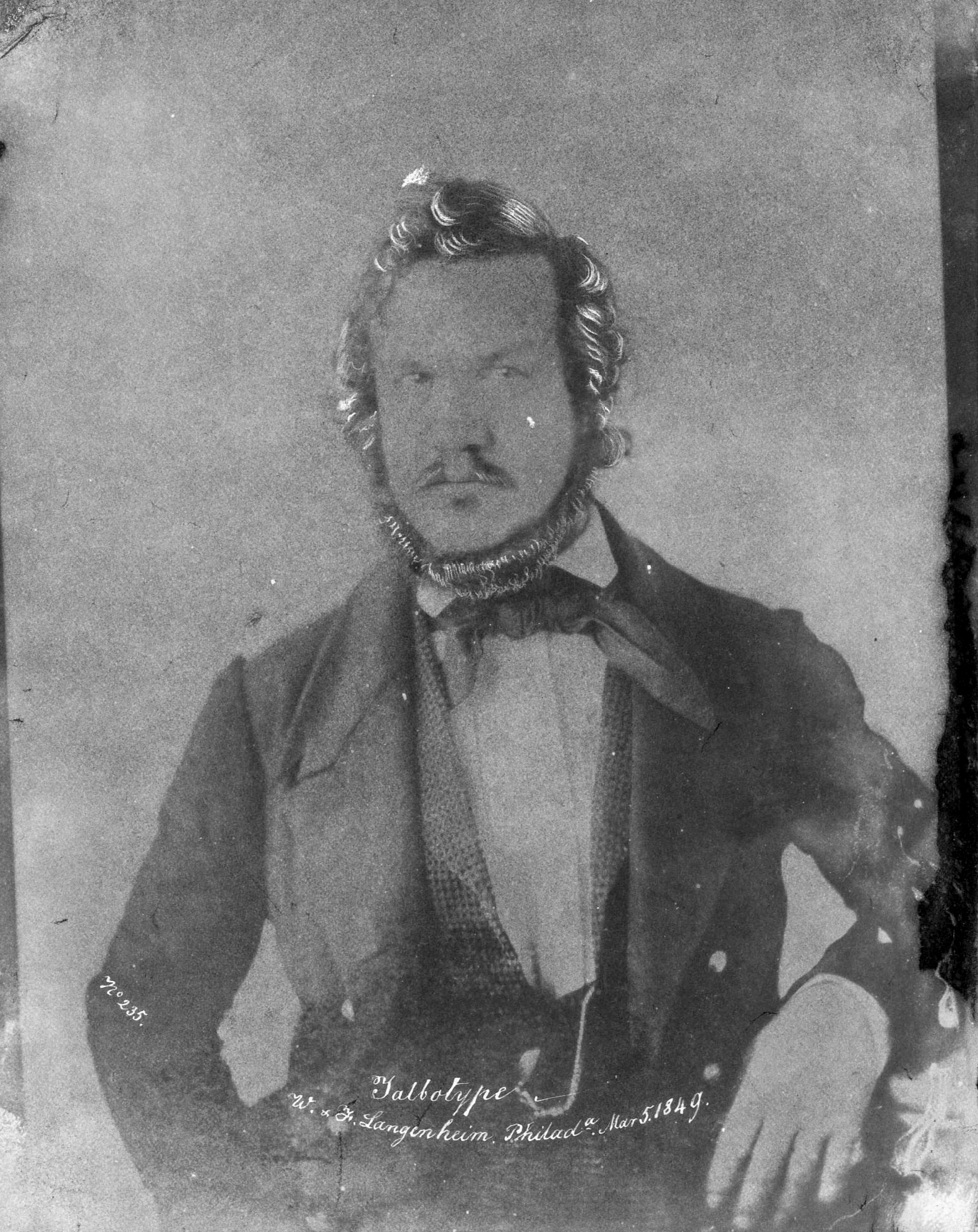
A calotype showing the American photographer Frederick Langenheim, circa 1849. The caption on the photo calls the process "Talbotype".

Talbot's early silver chloride "sensitive paper" experiments required camera exposures of an hour or more. In 1841, Talbot invented the calotype process, which, like Daguerre's process, used the principle of chemical development of a faint or invisible "latent" image to reduce the exposure time to a few minutes. Paper with a coating of silver iodide was exposed in the camera and developed into a translucent negative image. Unlike a daguerreotype, which could only be copied by photographing it with a camera, a calotype negative could be used to make a large number of positive prints by simple contact printing. The calotype had yet another distinction compared to other early photographic processes, in that the finished product lacked fine clarity due to its translucent paper negative. This was seen as a positive attribute for portraits because it softened the appearance of the human face. Talbot patented this process, which greatly limited its adoption, and spent many years pressing lawsuits against alleged infringers. He attempted to enforce a very broad interpretation of his patent, earning himself the ill will of photographers who were using the related glass-based processes later introduced by other inventors, but he was eventually defeated. Nonetheless, Talbot's developed-out silver halide negative process is the basic technology used by chemical film cameras today. Hippolyte Bayard had also developed a method of photography but delayed announcing it, and so was not recognized as its inventor.

In 1839, John Herschel made the first glass negative, but his process was difficult to reproduce. Slovene Janez Puhar invented a process for making photographs on glass in 1841; it was recognized on June 17, 1852, in Paris by the Académie National Agricole, Manufacturière et Commerciale. In 1847, Nicephore Niépce's cousin, the chemist Niépce St. Victor, published his invention of a process for making glass plates with an albumen emulsion; the Langenheim brothers of Philadelphia and John Whipple and William Breed Jones of Boston also invented workable negative-on-glass processes in the mid-1840s.

== 1850 to 1900 ==
In 1851, English sculptor Frederick Scott Archer invented the collodion process. Photographer and children's author Lewis Carroll used this process. Carroll refers to the process as "Talbotype" in the story "A Photographer's Day Out".

Herbert Bowyer Berkeley discovered that with his own addition of sulfite, to absorb the sulfur dioxide given off by the chemical dithionite in the developer, dithionite was not required in the developing process. In 1881, he published his discovery. Berkeley's formula contained pyrogallol, sulfite, and citric acid. Ammonia was added just before use to make the formula alkaline. The new formula was sold by the Platinotype Company in London as Sulphur-Pyrogallol Developer.

Nineteenth-century experimentation with photographic processes frequently became proprietary. The German-born, New Orleans photographer Theodore Lilienthal successfully sought legal redress in an 1881 infringement case involving his "Lambert Process" in the Eastern District of Louisiana.

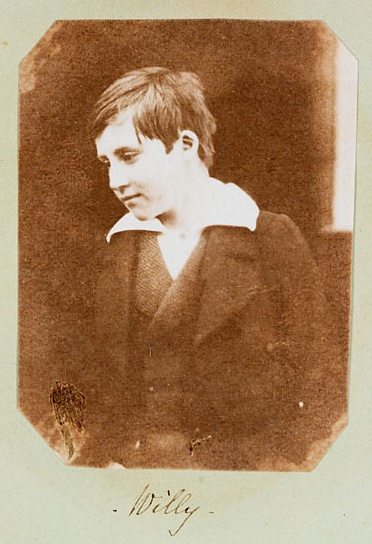
A photograph captured by Mary Dillwyn in Wales in 1853

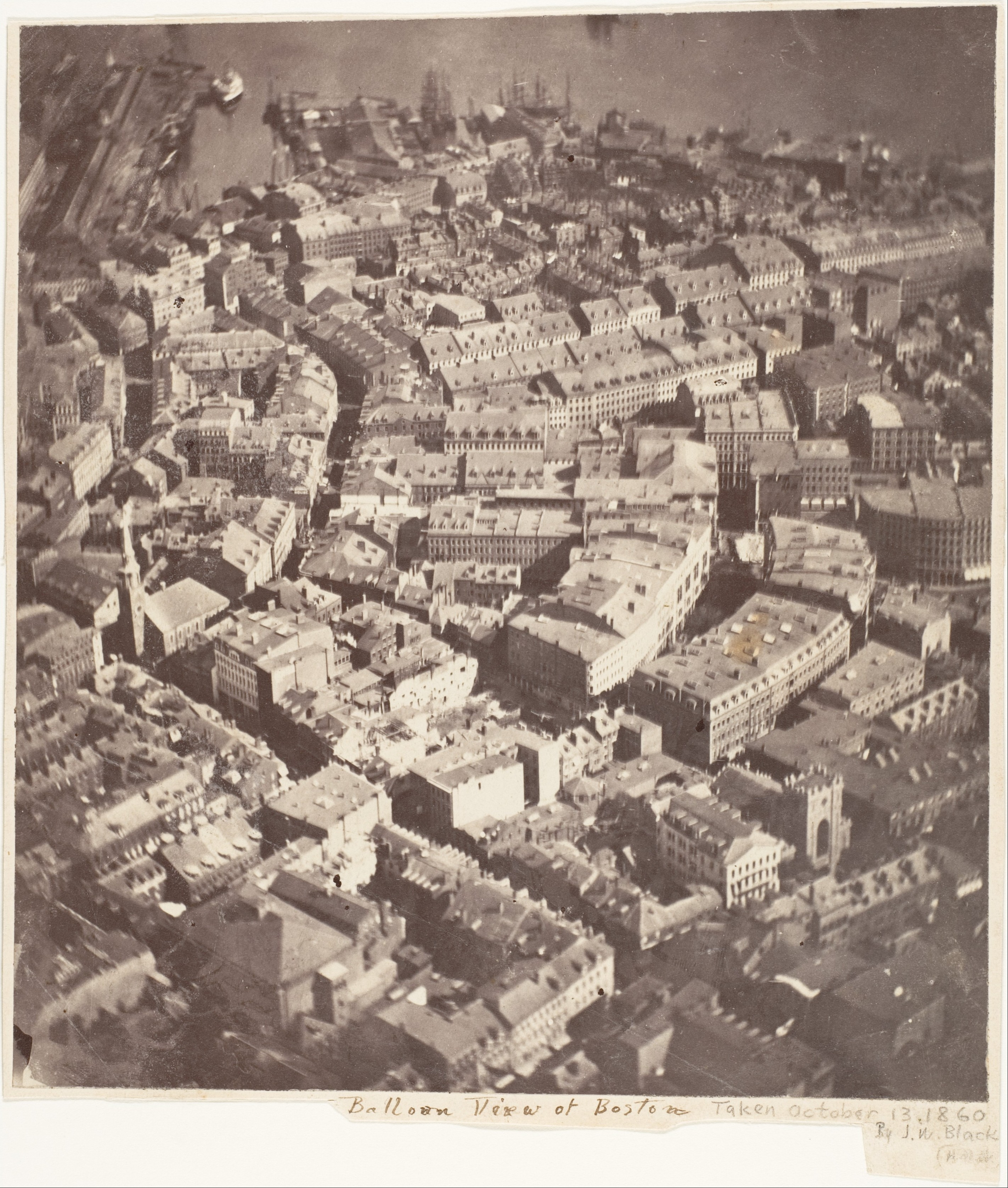
Boston, as the Eagle and the Wild Goose See It, by J.W. Black, the oldest surviving successful aerial photograph, October 1860

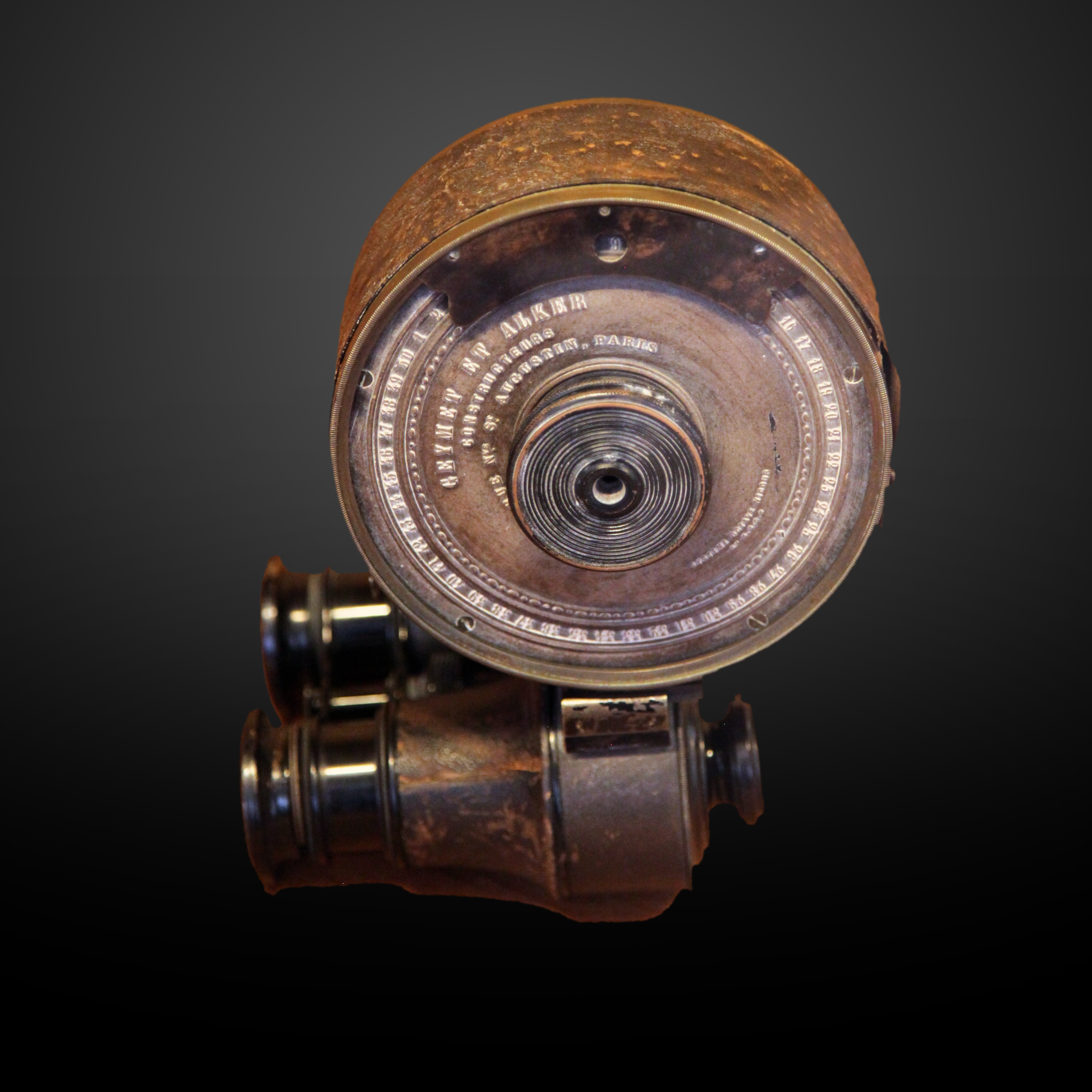
The 1866 "Jumelle de Nicour", an early attempt at a small-format, portable camera

== Popularization ==
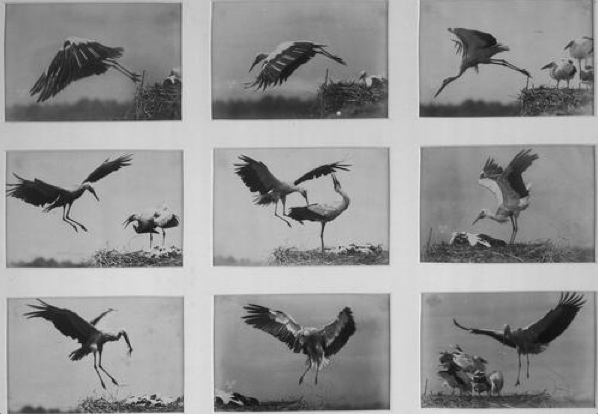
Ottomar Anschütz's images of white storks (Ciconia ciconia), taken in 1884 — the earliest known photographs of any wild bird

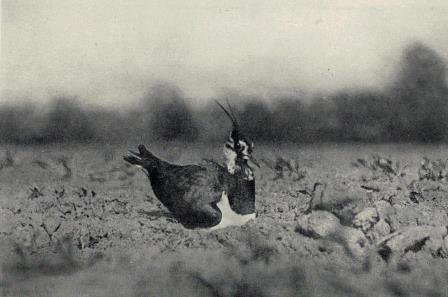
Lapwing incubating its eggs - Photograph of a lapwing (Vanellus vanellus), for which in 1895 R. B. Lodge received from the Royal Photographic Society the first medal ever presented for nature photography. Eric Hosking and Harold Lowes stated their — incorrect — belief that this was the first photograph of a wild bird.

The daguerreotype proved popular in response to the demand for portraiture that emerged from the middle classes during the Industrial Revolution. This demand, which could not be met in volume and in cost by oil painting, added to the push for the development of photography.

Roger Fenton and Philip Henry Delamotte helped popularize the new way of recording events, the first by his Crimean War pictures, the second by his record of the disassembly and reconstruction of The Crystal Palace in London. Other mid-nineteenth-century photographers established the medium as a more precise means than engraving or lithography of making a record of landscapes and architecture: for example, Robert Macpherson's broad range of photographs of Rome, the interior of the Vatican, and the surrounding countryside became a sophisticated tourist's visual record of his own travels.

In 1839, François Arago reported the invention of photography to stunned listeners by displaying the first photo taken in Egypt; that of Ras El Tin Palace. In his report of the invention to the French Chamber of Deputies, he emphasized photography's potential for documenting the Middle East, specifically noting the advantages it could have provided for Egyptian expeditions as a means of documentation and reproduction. In the following decades, his recommendations were taken up by many European photographers, making the Middle East an important site for experimentation and training in the early history of photography.

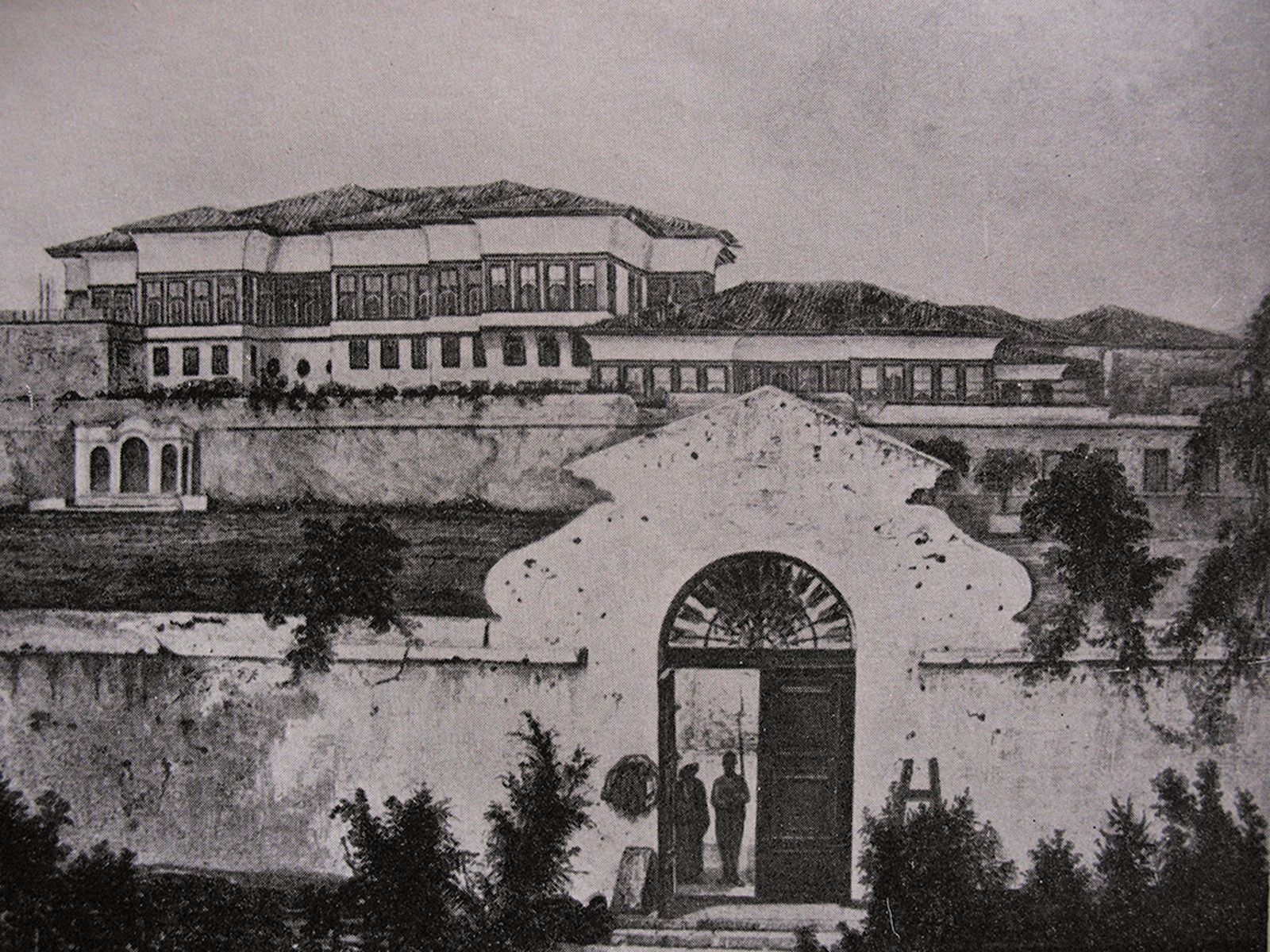
Ras el Tin palace, 7 November 1839

In America, by 1851 a broadsheet by daguerreotypist Augustus Washington was advertising prices ranging from 50 cents to $10. However, daguerreotypes were fragile and difficult to copy. Photographers encouraged chemists to refine the process of making many copies cheaply, which eventually led them back to Talbot's process.

Ultimately, the photographic process came about from a series of refinements and improvements in the first 20 years. In 1884 George Eastman, of Rochester, New York, developed dry gel on paper, or film, to replace the photographic plate so that a photographer no longer needed to carry boxes of plates and toxic chemicals around. In July 1888 Eastman's Kodak camera went on the market with the slogan "You press the button, we do the rest". Now anyone could take a photograph and leave the complex parts of the process to others, and photography became available for the mass-market in 1901 with the introduction of the Kodak Brownie.

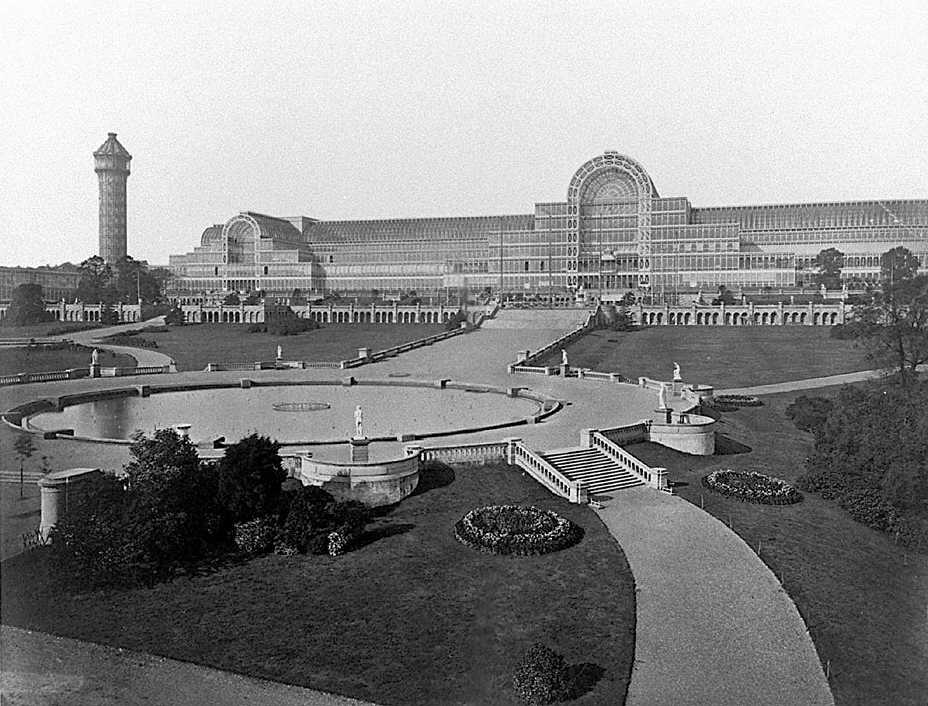
General view of The Crystal Palace at Sydenham by Philip Henry Delamotte, 1854

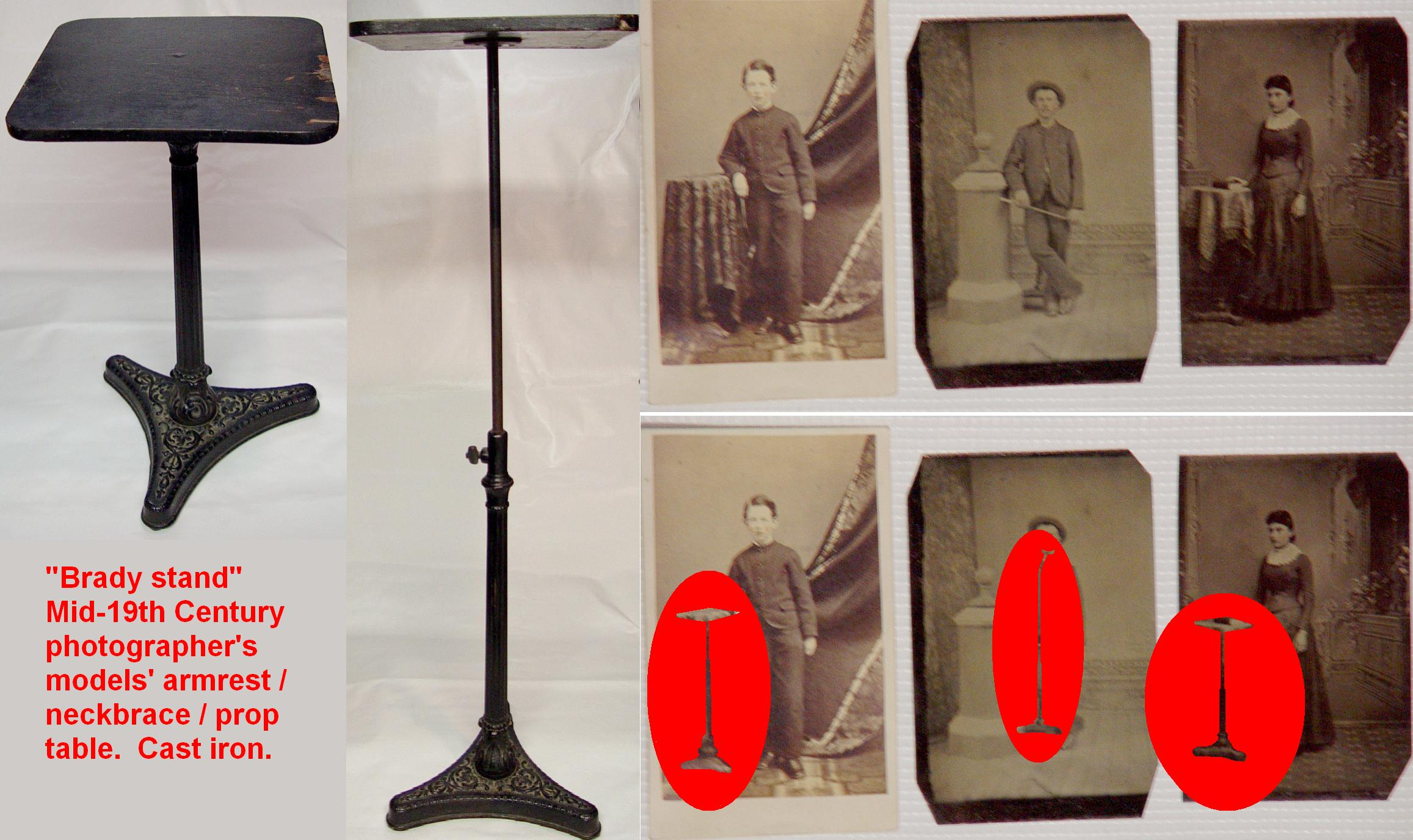
A mid-19th century "Brady stand" armrest table, used to help subjects keep still during long exposures. It was named for famous US photographer Mathew Brady.

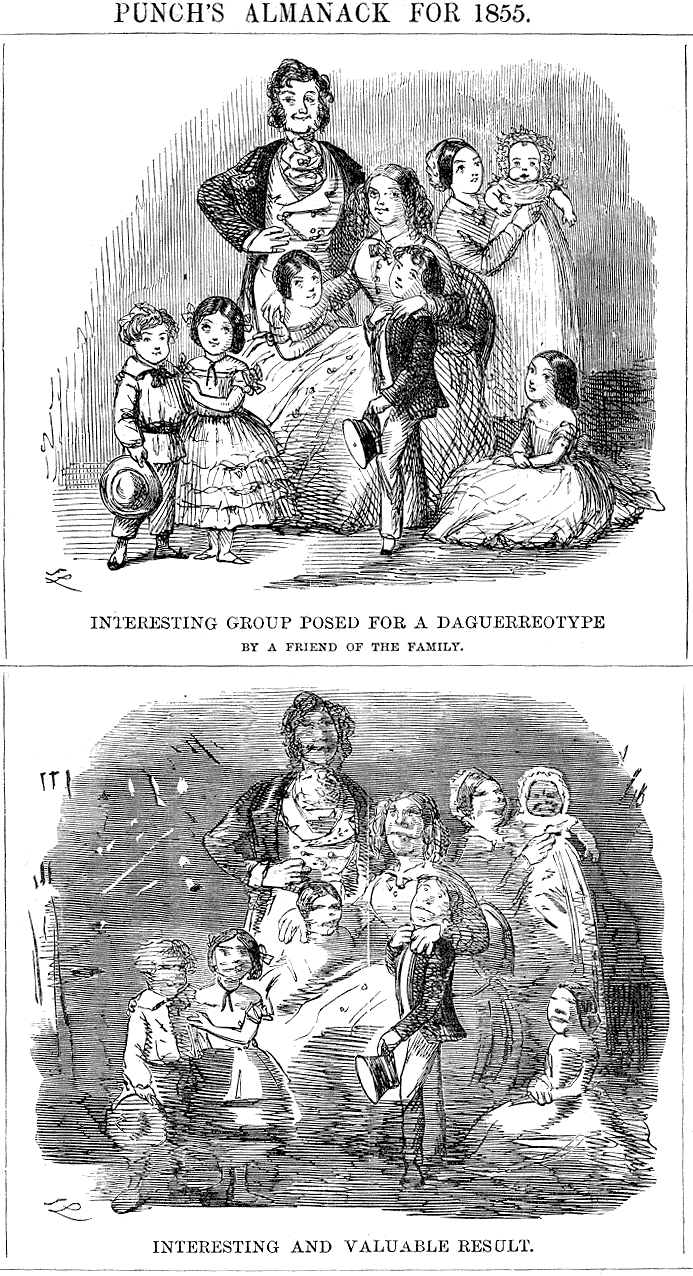
An 1855 Punch cartoon satirized problems with posing for Daguerreotypes: slight movement during exposure resulted in blurred features, red-blindness made rosy complexions look dark.

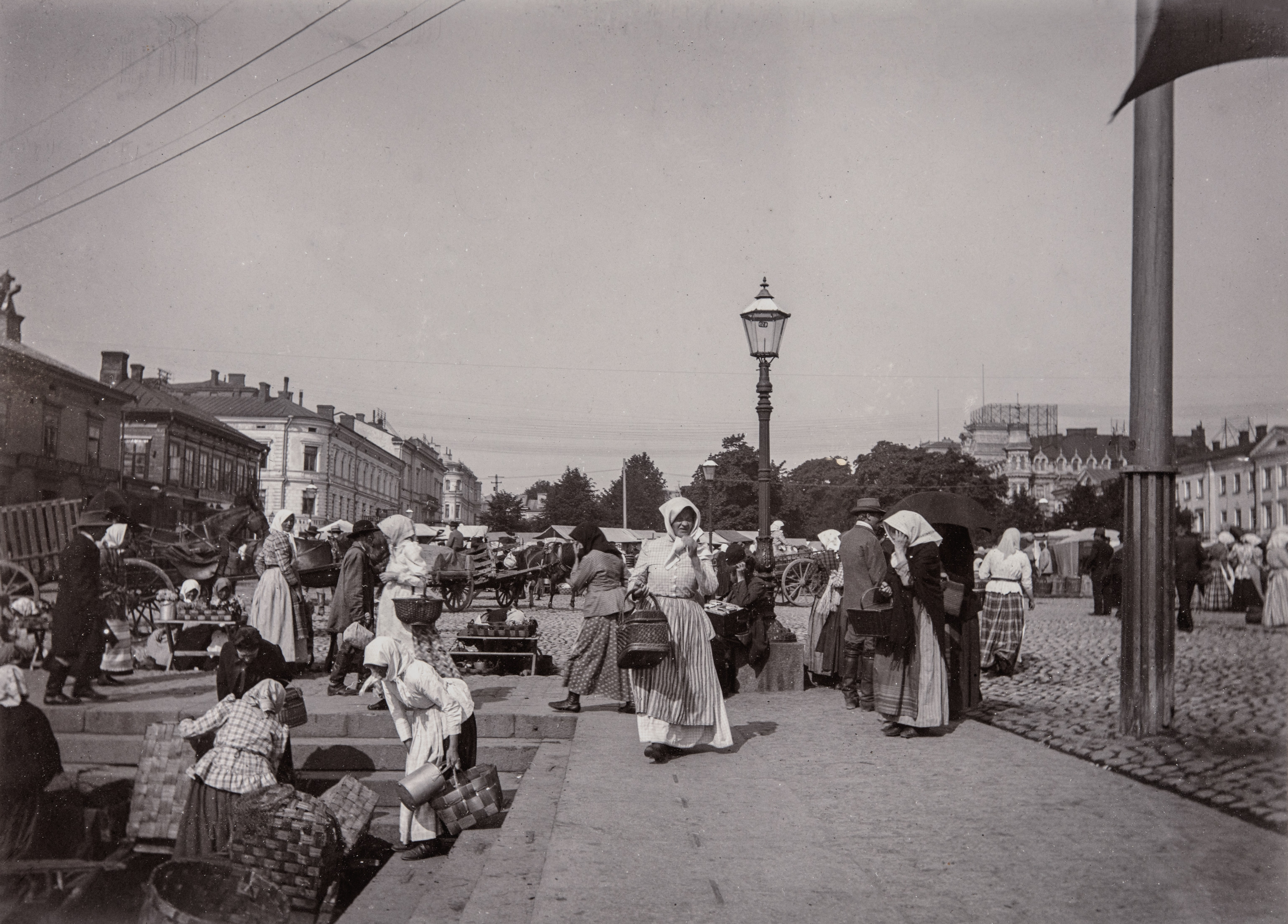
The Market Square of Helsinki, in the 1890s

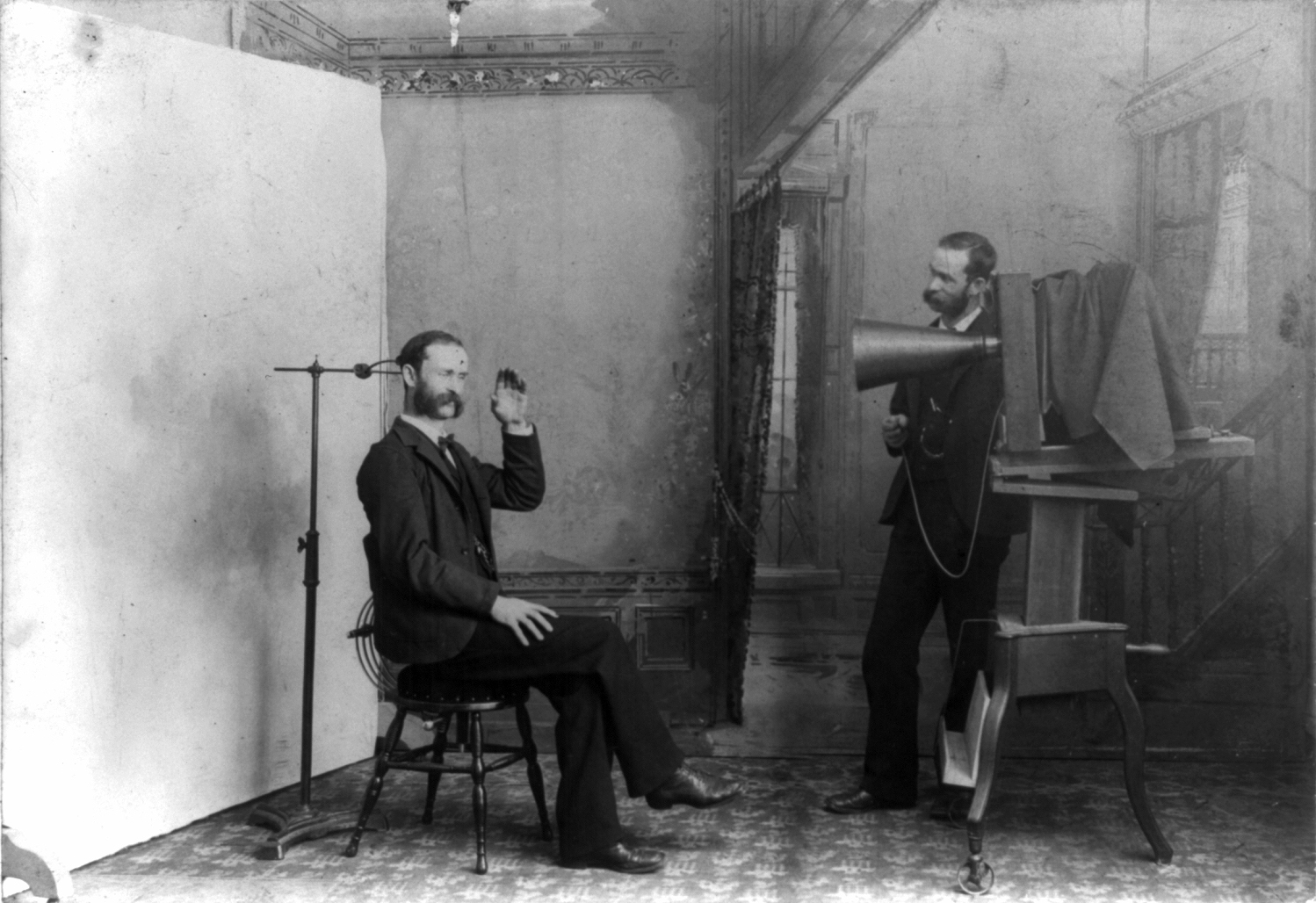
In this 1893 multiple-exposure trick photo, the photographer appears to be photographing himself. It satirizes studio equipment and procedures that were nearly obsolete by then. Note the clamp to hold the sitter's head still.

A comparison of common print sizes used in photographic studios during the 19th century. Sizes are in inches.

== Stereoscopic photography ==
Charles Wheatstone developed his mirror stereoscope around 1832, but did not really publicize his invention until June 1838. He recognized the possibility of a combination with photography soon after Daguerre and Talbot announced their inventions and got Henry Fox Talbot to produce some calotype pairs for the stereoscope. He received the first results in October 1840, but was not fully satisfied as the angle between the shots was very big. Between 1841 and 1842 Henry Collen made calotypes of statues, buildings and portraits, including a portrait of Charles Babbage shot in August 1841. Wheatstone also obtained daguerreotype stereograms from Mr. Beard in 1841 and from Hippolyte Fizeau and Antoine Claudet in 1842. None of these have yet been located.

David Brewster developed a stereoscope with lenses and a binocular camera in 1844. He presented two stereoscopic self portraits made by John Adamson in March 1849. A stereoscopic portrait of Adamson in the University of St Andrews Library Photographic Archive, dated "circa 1845', may be one of these sets. A stereoscopic daguerreotype portrait of Michael Faraday in Kingston College's Wheatstone collection and on loan to Bradford National Media Museum, dated "circa 1848", may be older.

== Color process ==
A practical means of color photography was sought from the very beginning. Results were demonstrated by Edmond Becquerel as early as the year of 1848, but exposures lasting for hours or days were required and the captured colors were so light-sensitive they would only bear very brief inspection in dim light.

The first color photograph was a set of three black-and-white photographs taken through red, green, and blue color filters and shown superimposed by using three projectors with similar filters. It was taken by Thomas Sutton in 1861 for use in a lecture by the Scottish physicist James Clerk Maxwell, who had proposed the method in 1855. The photographic emulsions then in use were insensitive to most of the spectrum, so the result was very imperfect and the demonstration was soon forgotten. Maxwell's method is now most widely known through the early 20th century work of Sergei Prokudin-Gorskii. It was made practical by Hermann Wilhelm Vogel's 1873 discovery of a way to make emulsions sensitive to the rest of the spectrum, gradually introduced into commercial use beginning in the mid-1880s.

Two French inventors, Louis Ducos du Hauron and Charles Cros, working unknown to each other during the 1860s, famously unveiled their nearly identical ideas on the same day in 1869. Included were methods for viewing a set of three color-filtered black-and-white photographs in color without having to project them, and for using them to make full-color prints on paper.

The first widely used method of color photography was the Autochrome plate, a process inventors and brothers Auguste and Louis Lumière began working on in the 1890s and commercially introduced in 1907. It was based on one of Louis Duclos du Haroun's ideas: instead of taking three separate photographs through color filters, take one through a mosaic of tiny color filters overlaid on the emulsion and view the results through an identical mosaic. If the individual filter elements were small enough, the three primary colors of red, blue, and green would blend together in the eye and produce the same additive color synthesis as the filtered projection of three separate photographs.

Autochrome plates had an integral mosaic filter layer with roughly five million previously dyed potato grains per square inch added to the surface. Then through the use of a rolling press, five tons of pressure were used to flatten the grains, enabling every one of them to capture and absorb color and their microscopic size allowing the illusion that the colors are merged. The final step was adding a coat of the light-capturing substance silver bromide, after which a color image could be imprinted and developed. In order to see it, reversal processing was used to develop each plate into a transparent positive that could be viewed directly or projected with an ordinary projector. One of the drawbacks of the technology was an exposure time of at least a second in bright daylight, with the time required quickly increasing in poor light. An indoor portrait required several minutes with the subject stationary. This was because the grains absorbed color fairly slowly, and a filter of a yellowish-orange color was required to keep the photograph from coming out excessively blue. Although necessary, the filter had the effect of reducing the amount of light that was absorbed. Another drawback was that the image could only be enlarged so much before the many dots that made up the image would become apparent.

Competing screen plate products soon appeared, and film-based versions were eventually made. All were expensive, and until the 1930s none was "fast" enough for hand-held snapshot-taking, so they mostly served a niche market of affluent advanced amateurs.

A new era in color photography began with the introduction of Kodachrome film, available for 16 mm home movies in 1935 and 35 mm slides in 1936. It captured the red, green, and blue color components in three layers of emulsion. A complex processing operation produced complementary cyan, magenta, and yellow dye images in those layers, resulting in a subtractive color image. Maxwell's method of taking three separate filtered black-and-white photographs continued to serve special purposes into the 1950s and beyond, and Polachrome, an "instant" slide film that used the Autochrome's additive principle, was available until 2003, but the few color print and slide films still being made in 2015 all use the multilayer emulsion approach pioneered by Kodachrome.

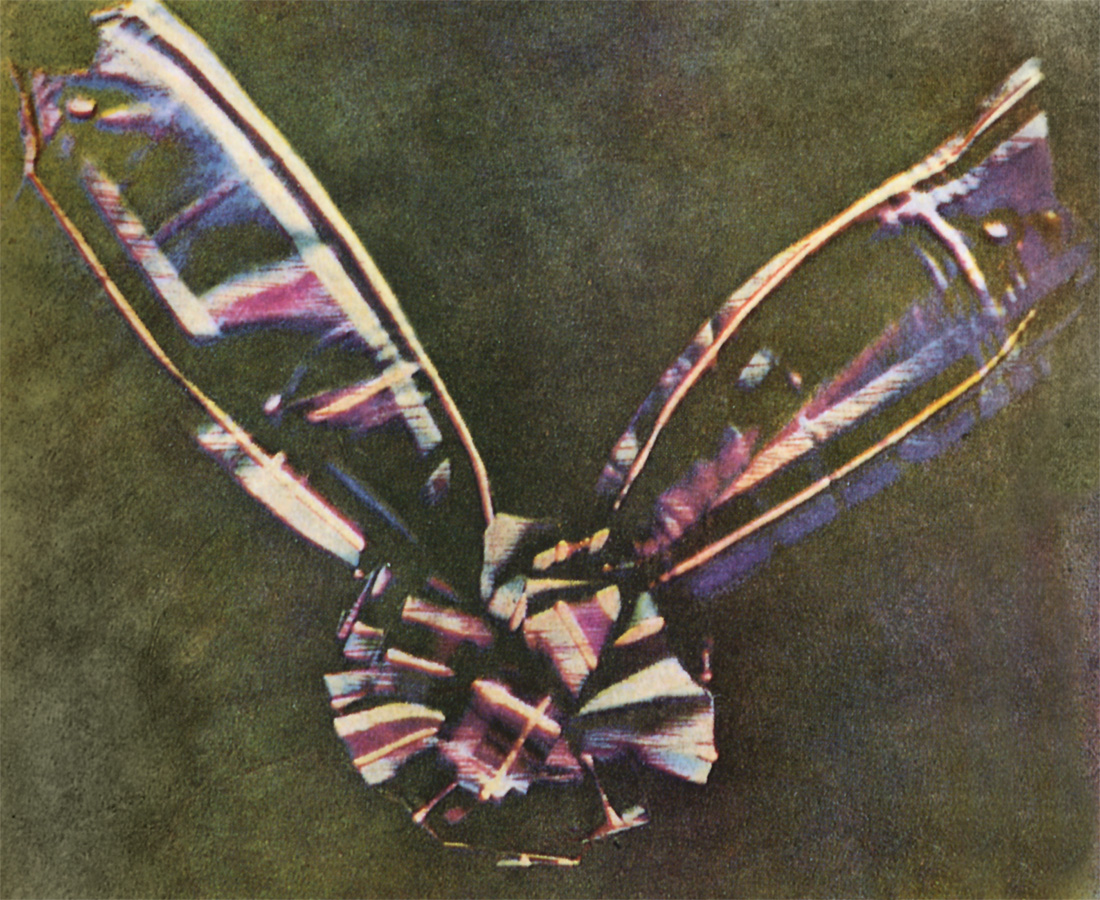
The first durable color photograph, taken by Thomas Sutton in 1861.

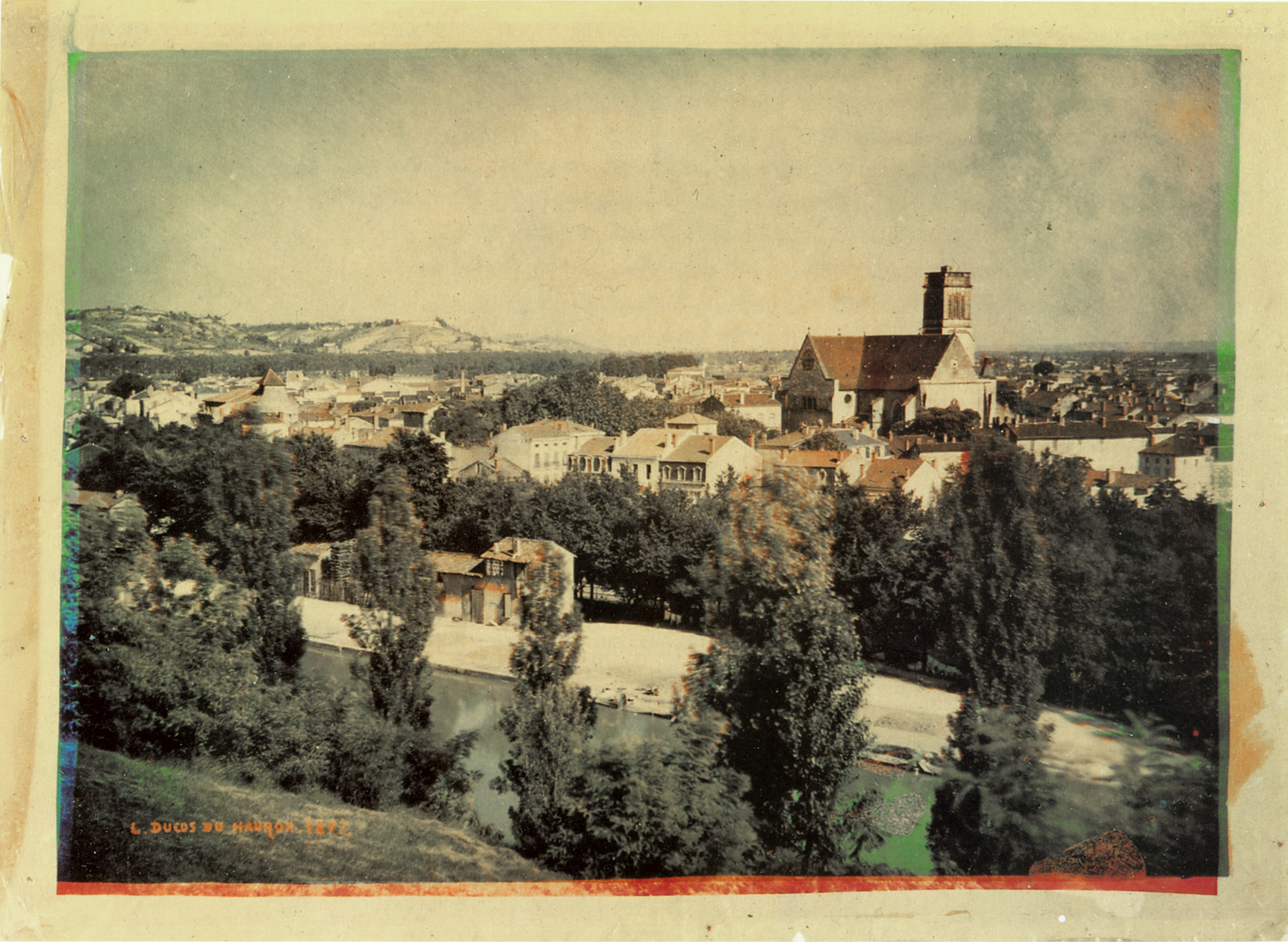
An 1877 color photographic print on paper by Louis Ducos du Hauron, the foremost early French pioneer of color photography by subtractive color.

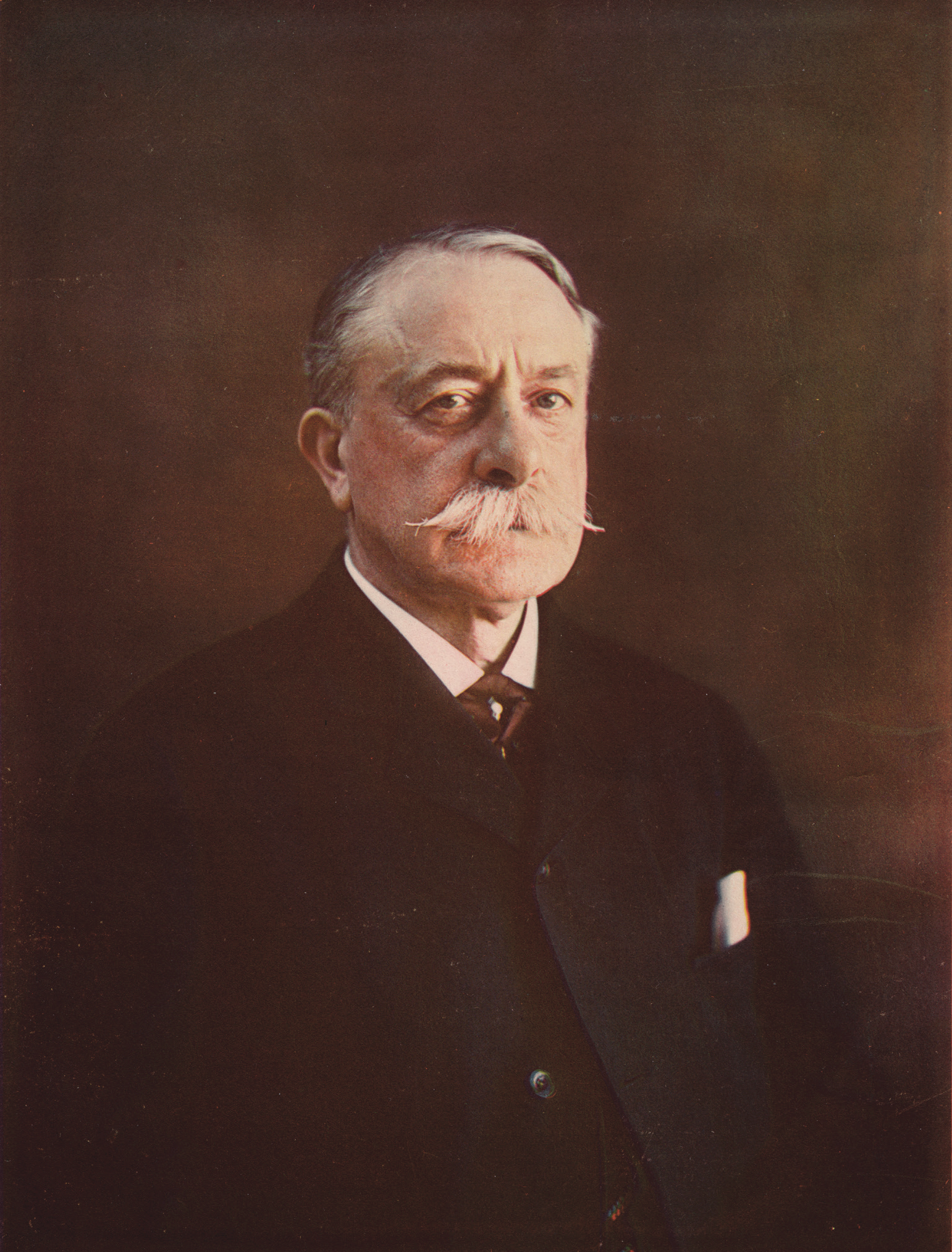
Albert Bierstadt photographed by his brother Edward Bierstadt. This collotype print was sent in 1895 to Elbridge T. Gerry. It may be the oldest surviving color portrait photograph.

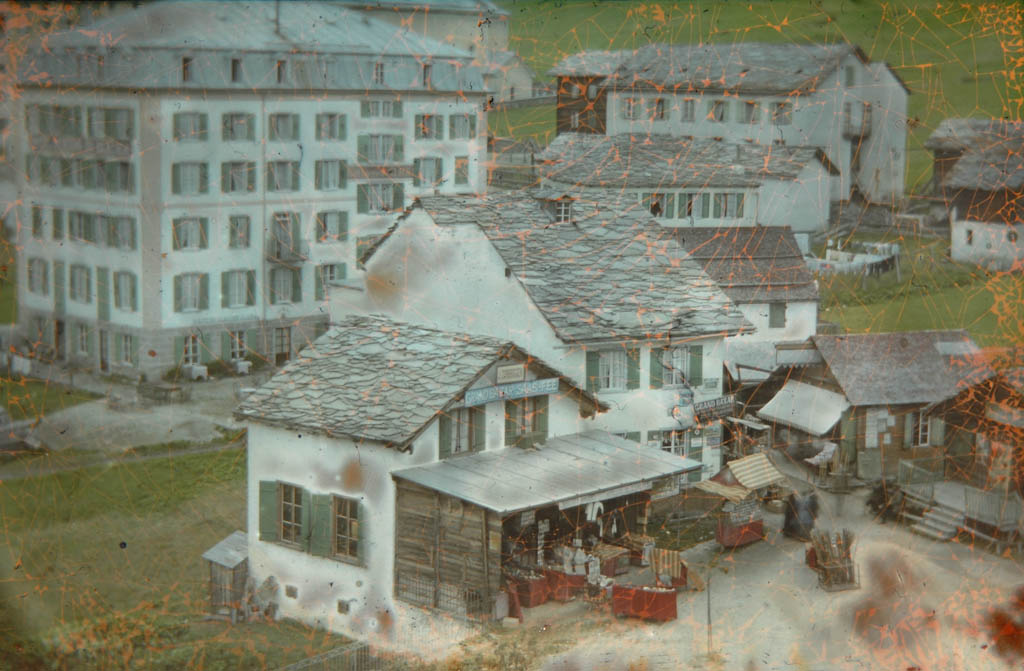
Color photograph of Saas-Fee by Gabriel Lippmann, 1891-99.

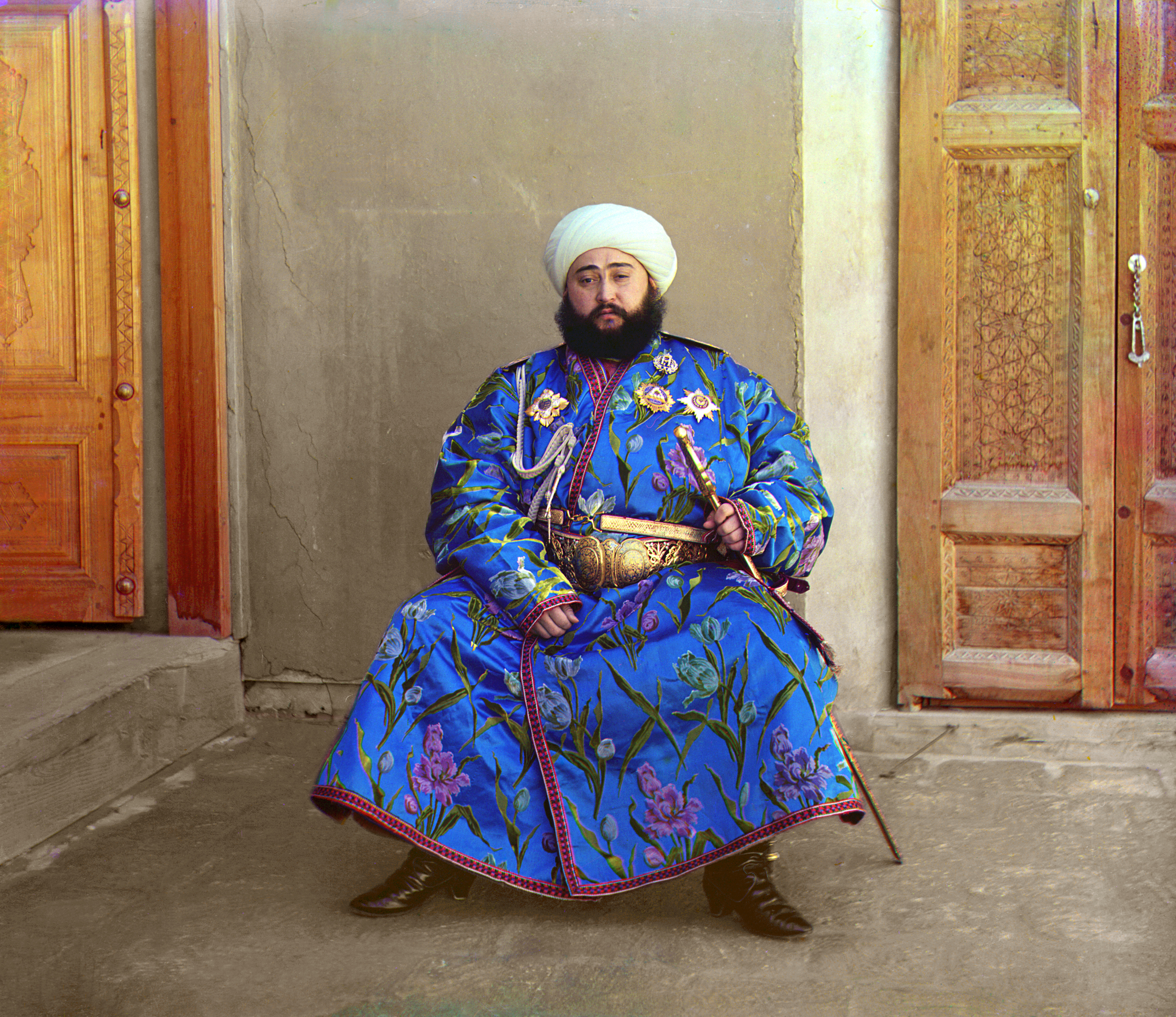
Alim Khan photographed by Sergey Prokudin-Gorsky using Maxwell's method, 1911

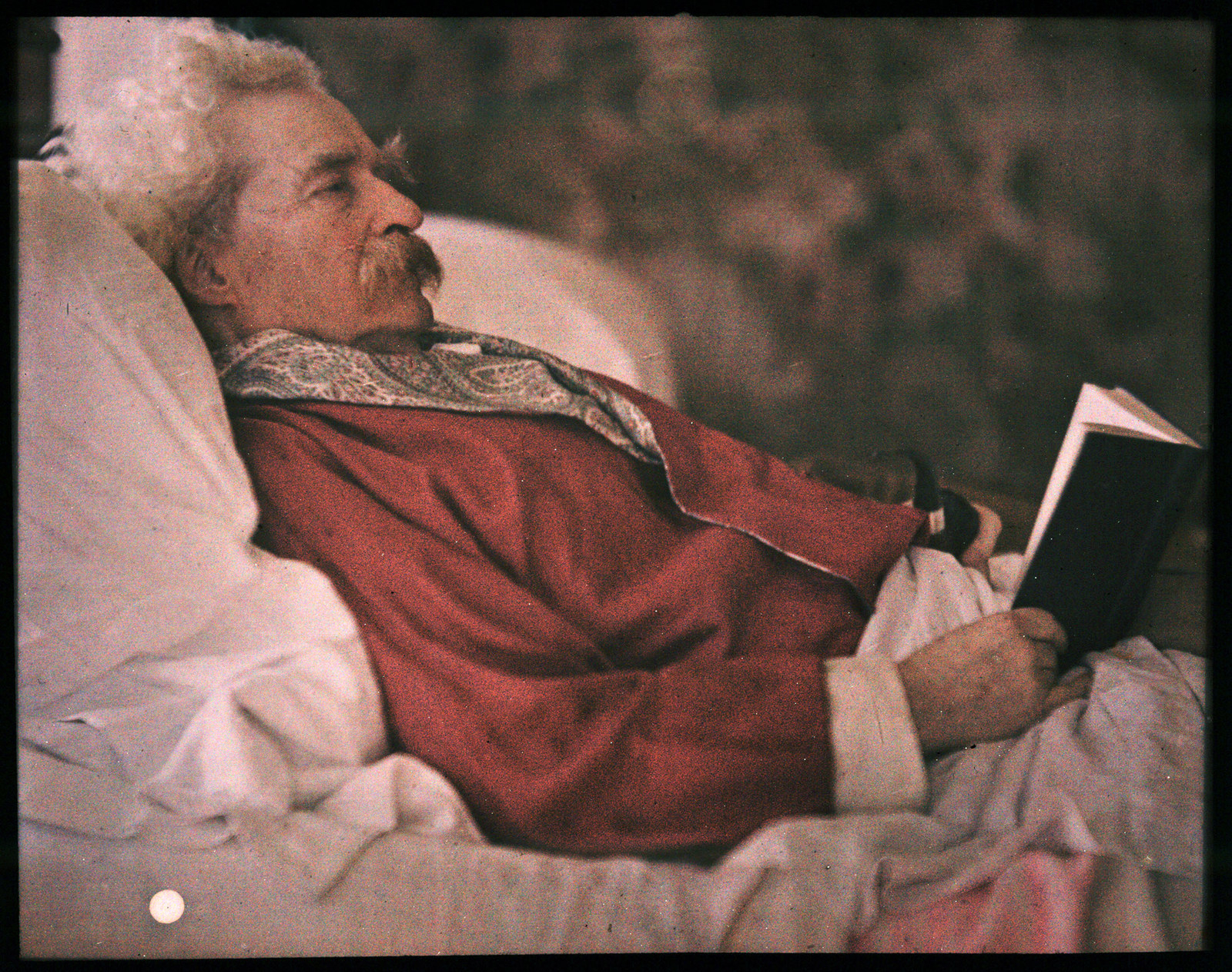
A color portrait of Mark Twain by Alvin Langdon Coburn, 1908, made by the recently introduced Autochrome process

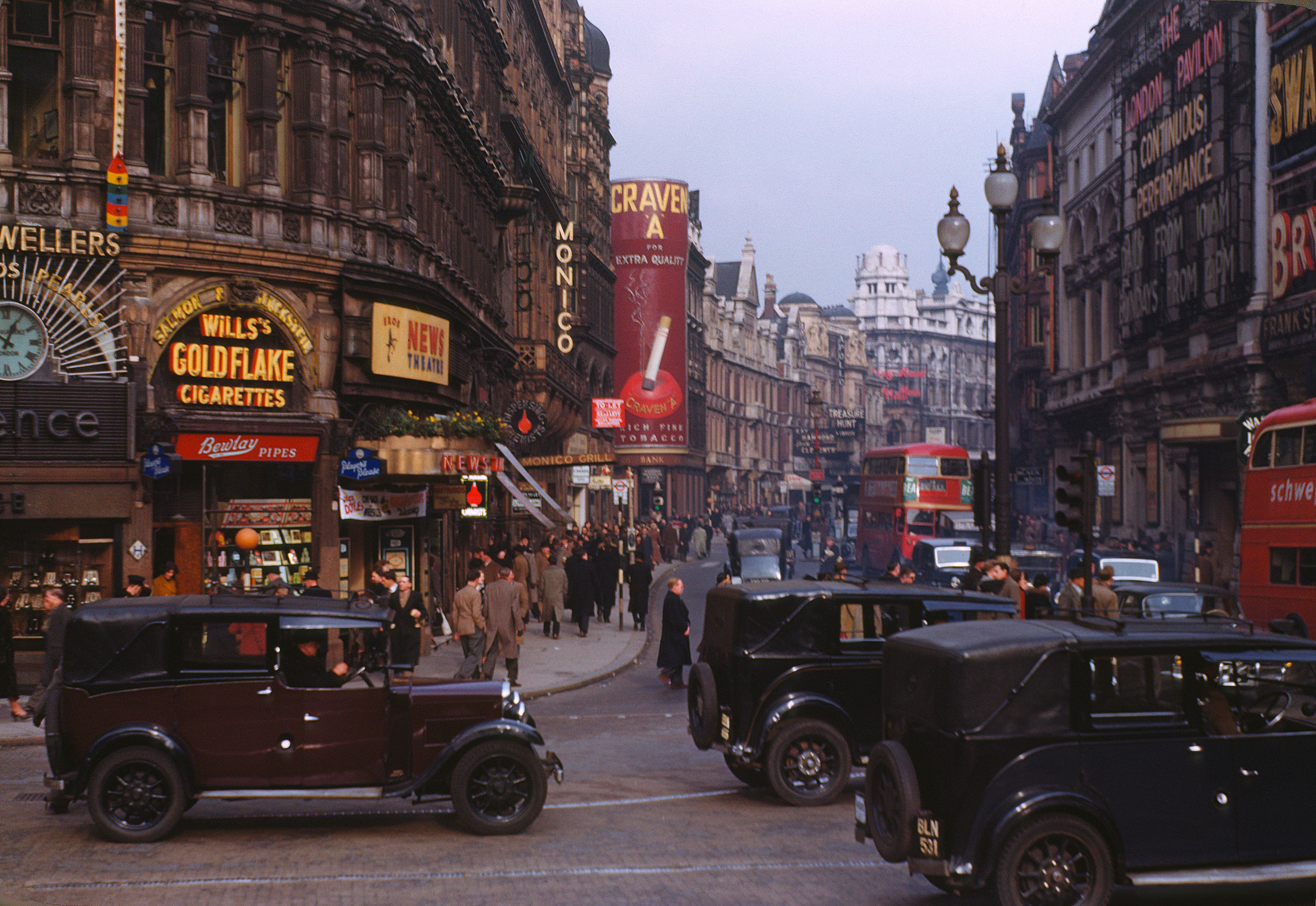
Kodachrome photo by Chalmers Butterfield of Shaftesbury Avenue from Piccadilly Circus, in the West End of London, c. 1949

== Development of digital photography ==
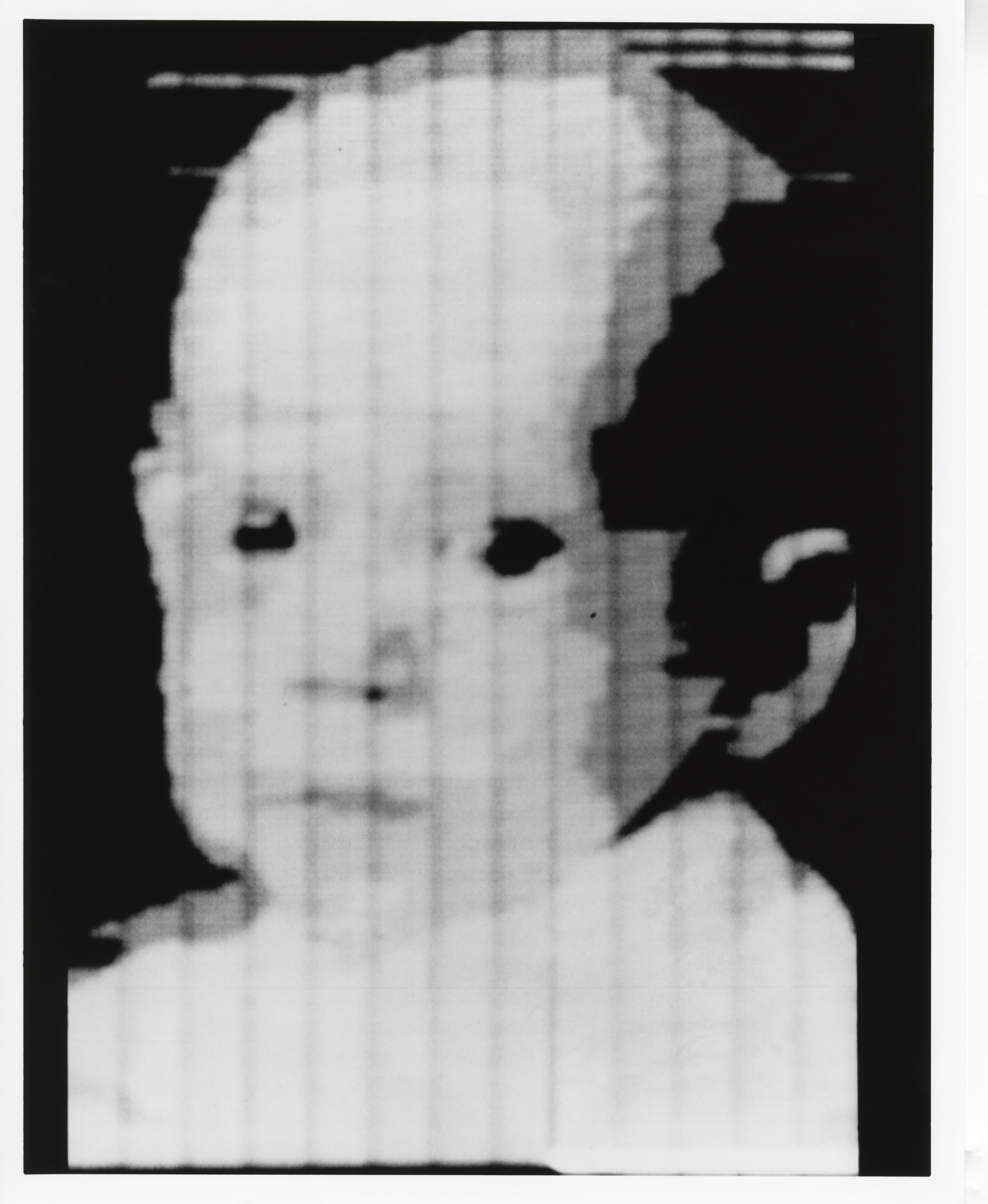
Walden Kirsch as scanned into the SEAC computer in 1957

In 1957, a team led by Russell A. Kirsch at the National Institute of Standards and Technology developed a binary digital version of an existing technology, the wirephoto drum scanner, so that alphanumeric characters, diagrams, photographs and other graphics could be transferred into digital computer memory. One of the first photographs scanned was a picture of Kirsch's infant son Walden. The resolution was 176x176 pixels with only one bit per pixel, i.e., stark black and white with no intermediate gray tones, but by combining multiple scans of the photograph done with different black-white threshold settings, grayscale information could also be acquired.

The charge-coupled device (CCD) is the image-capturing optoelectronic component in first-generation digital cameras. It was invented in 1969 by Willard Boyle and George E. Smith at AT&T Bell Labs as a memory device. The lab was working on the Picturephone and on the development of semiconductor bubble memory. Merging these two initiatives, Boyle and Smith conceived of the design of what they termed "Charge 'Bubble' Devices". The essence of the design was the ability to transfer charge along the surface of a semiconductor. It was Dr. Michael Tompsett from Bell Labs however, who discovered that the CCD could be used as an imaging sensor. The CCD has increasingly been replaced by the active pixel sensor (APS), commonly used in cell phone cameras. These mobile phone cameras are used by billions of people worldwide, dramatically increasing photographic activity and material and also fueling citizen journalism.

- 1973 – Fairchild Semiconductor releases the first large image-capturing CCD chip: 100 rows and 100 columns.
- 1975 – Bryce Bayer of Kodak develops the Bayer filter mosaic pattern for CCD color image sensors
- 1986 – Kodak scientists develop the world's first megapixel sensor.

The web has been a popular medium for storing and sharing photos ever since the first photograph was published on the web by Tim Berners-Lee in 1992 (an image of the CERN house band Les Horribles Cernettes). Since then sites and apps such as Facebook, Flickr, Instagram, Picasa (discontinued in 2016), Imgur, Photobucket and Snapchat have been used by many millions of people to share their pictures.

== Gallery of historical photos ==
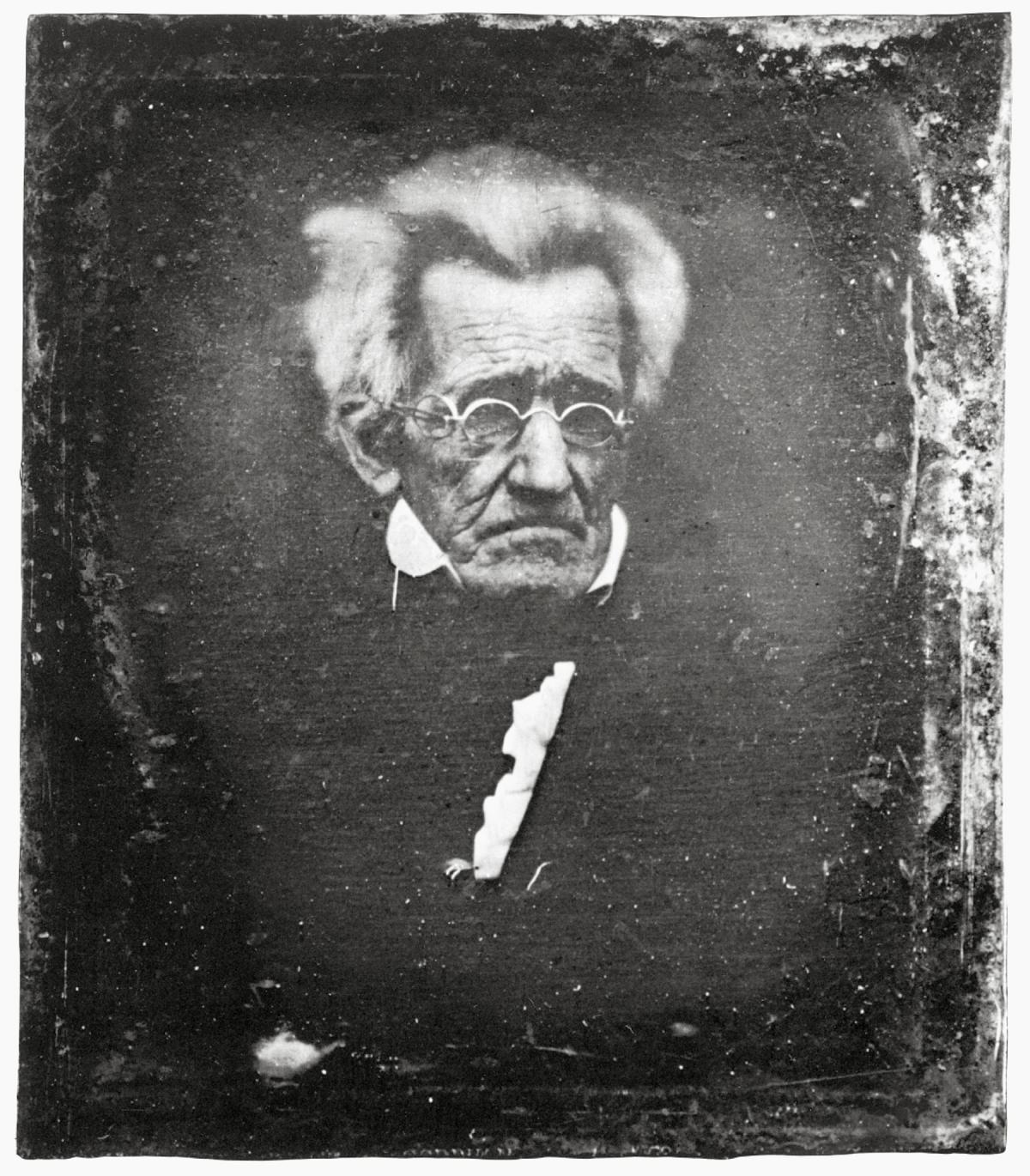
Andrew Jackson at age 78.

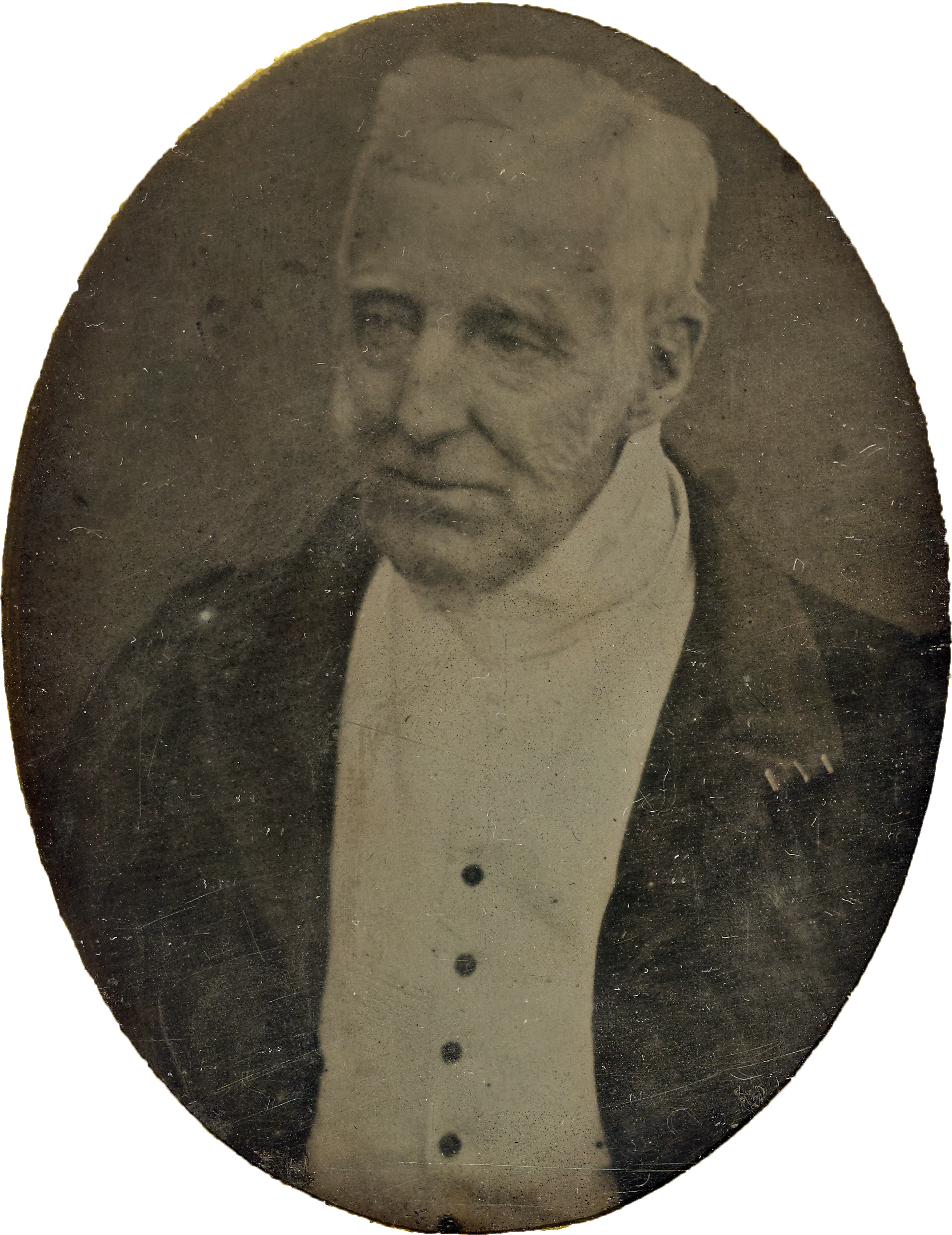
Arthur Wellesley, the Duke of Wellington, aged 74 or 75, made by Antoine Claudet in 1844.

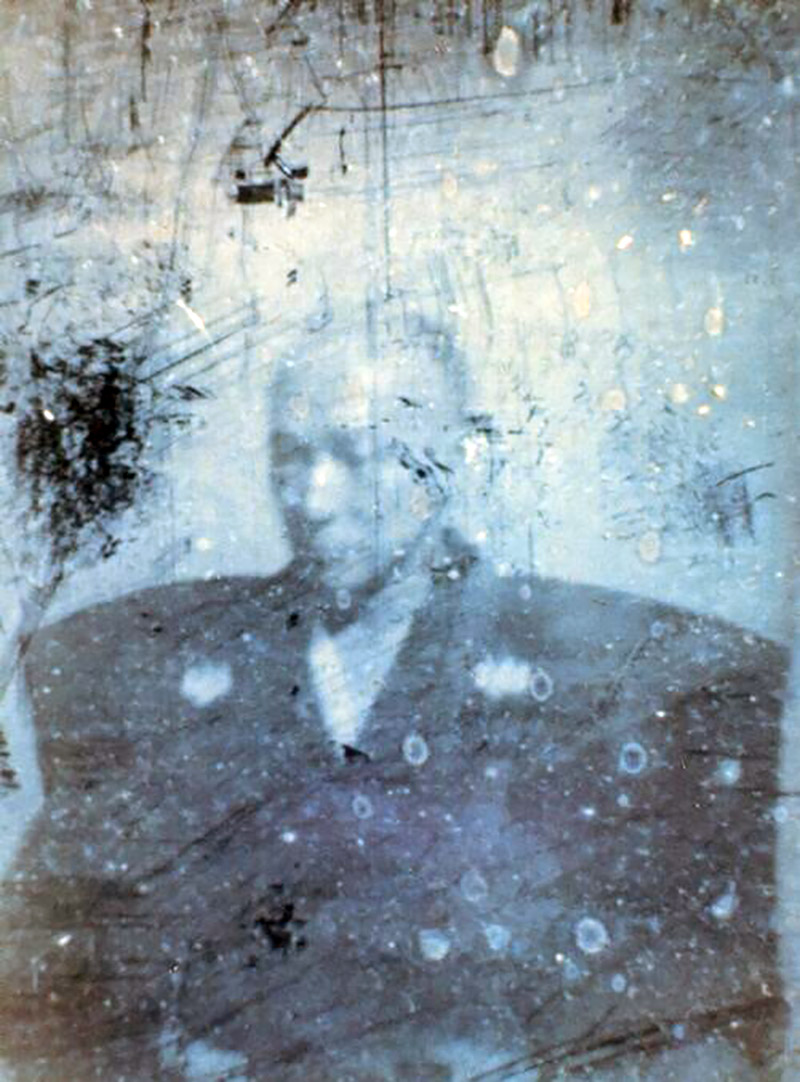
Shimazu Nariakira, made by Ichiki Shirō in 1857, the earliest surviving Japanese-made photograph

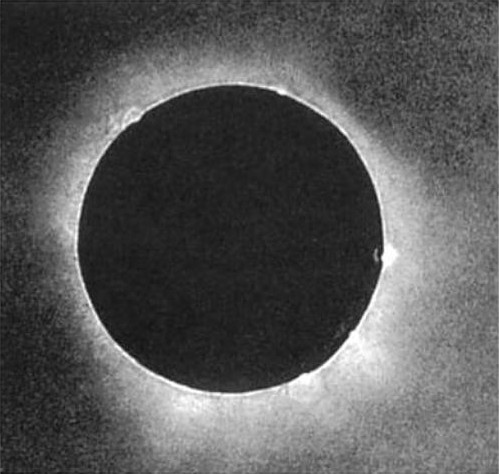
The solar eclipse of July 28, 1851, the first correctly exposed photograph of a solar eclipse using the daguerreotype process

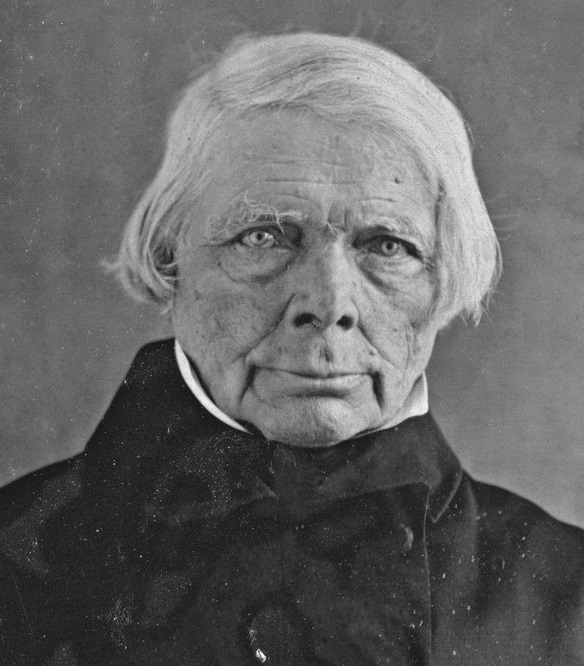
Philosopher Friedrich Wilhelm Joseph Schelling, made by Hermann Biow in February 1848.

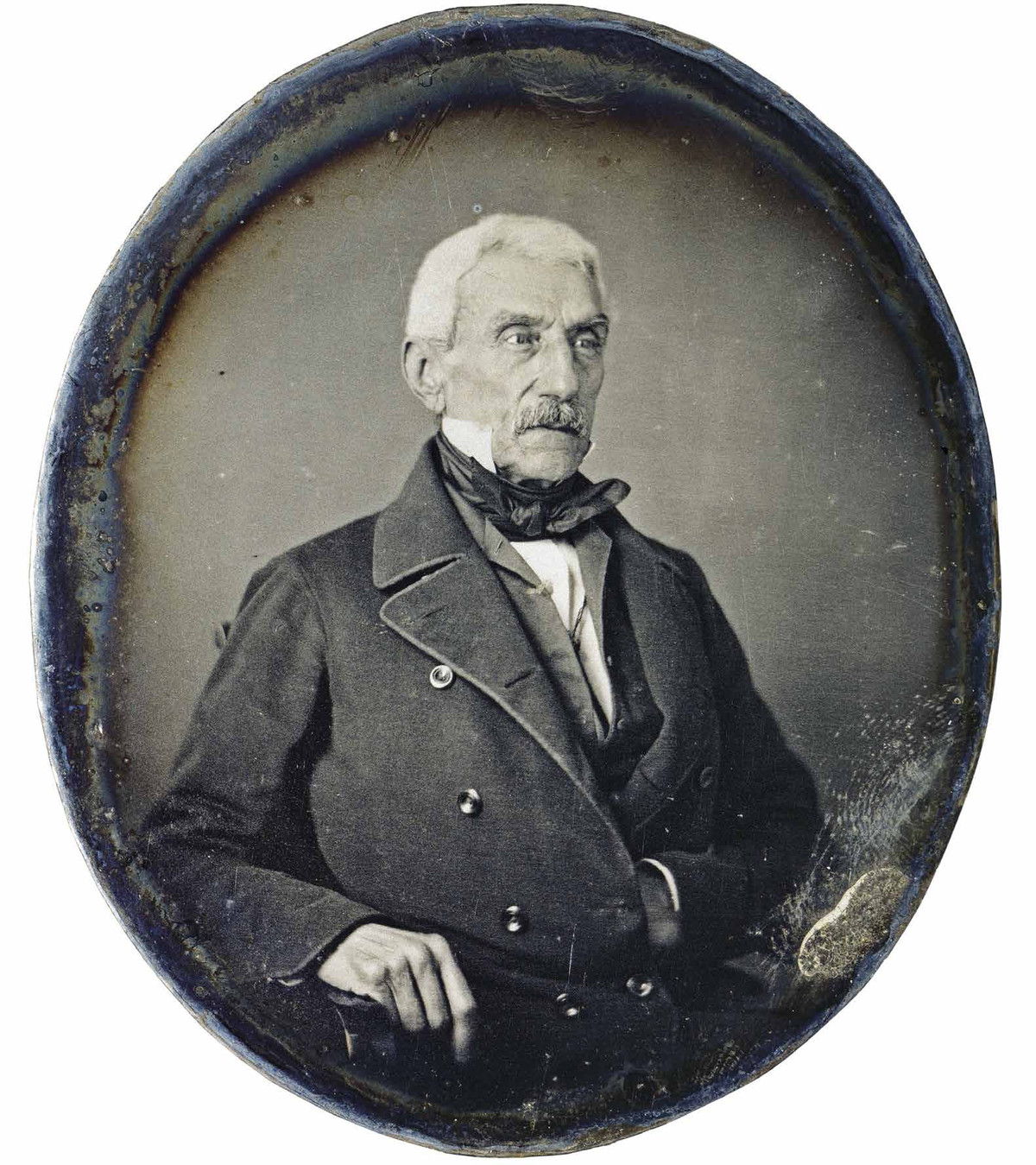
José de San Martín, made in Paris 1848.

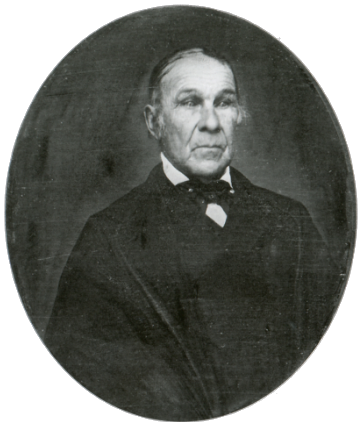
John Adams a shoemaker aged 100, born in 1745, possibly the earliest-born person photographed

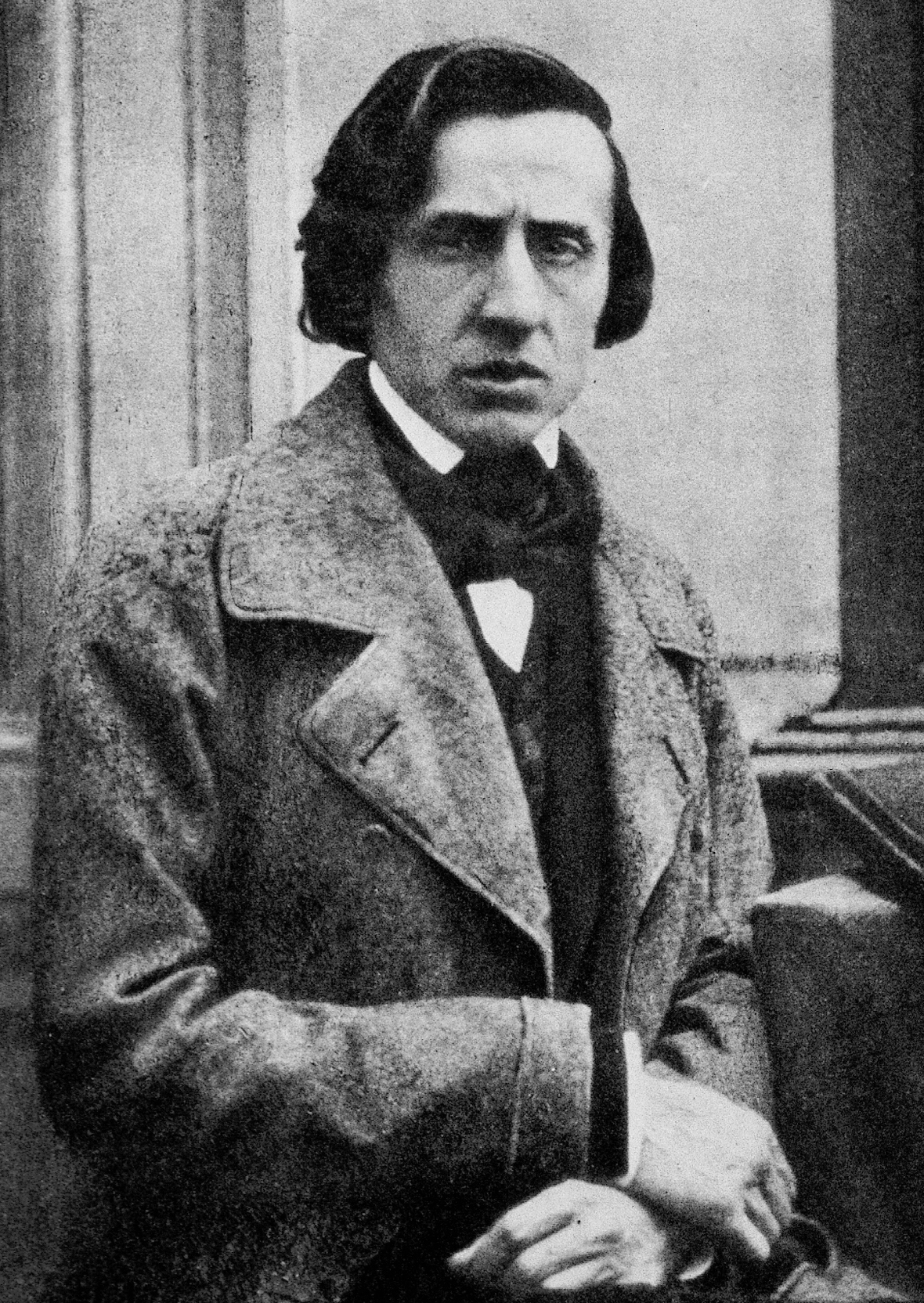
Frédéric Chopin, c. 1849

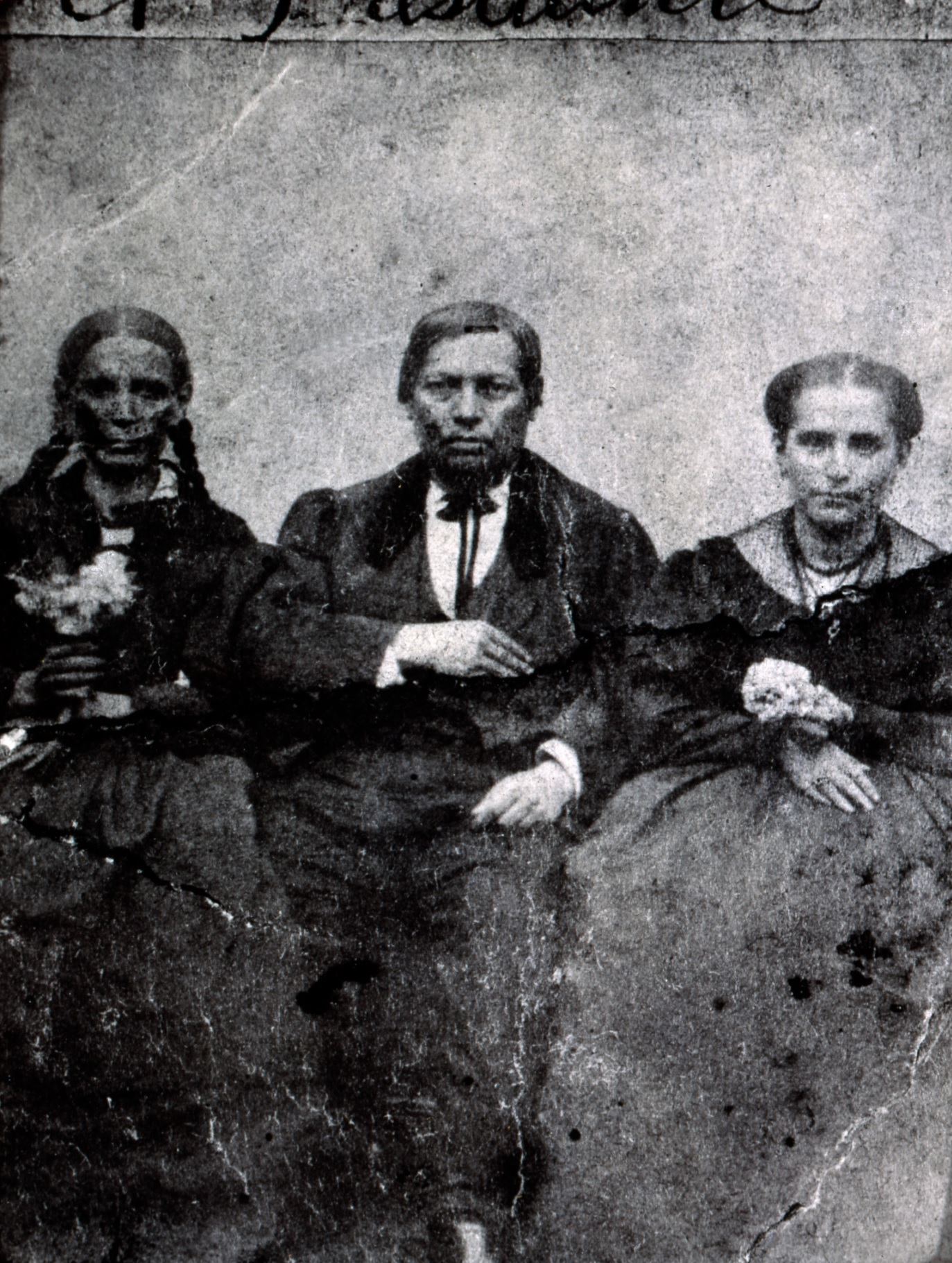
Benito Juárez on the day of his marriage with Margarita Maza (right), in 1843. Juárez would become president of Mexico more than 14 years after this picture was taken

== See also ==
- History of the camera
- History of Photography (academic journal)
- Albumen print
- History of photographic lens design
- Timeline of photography technology
- Outline of photography
- List of photographs considered the most important
- Photography by indigenous peoples of the Americas
- Women photographers
- Movie camera
- Instant film
