= Philip Henry Delamotte =

British photographer and illustrator (1821–1889)

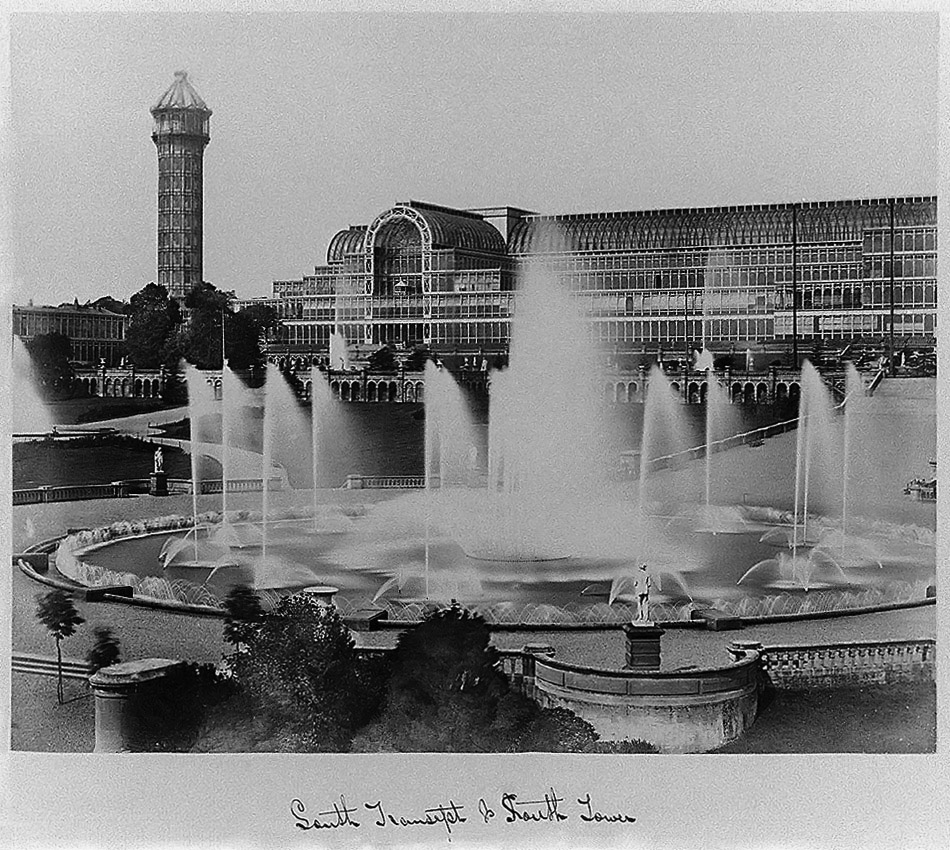
The fountains at The Crystal Place at Sydenham

Philip Henry Delamotte (21 April 1821 – 24 February 1889) was a British photographer and illustrator.

== Life ==
Delamotte was born at the Royal Military College, Sandhurst, the son of Mary and William Alfred Delamotte. Philip Delamotte became an artist and was famous for his photographic images of the Crystal Palace of 1854. He eventually became Professor of Drawing and Fine Art at King's College London.

== The Crystal Palace ==
He was commissioned to record the disassembly of the Crystal Palace in 1852, and its reconstruction and expansion at Sydenham, a project finished in 1854. His photographic record of the events is one of the best archives of the way the building was constructed and he published the prints in several books. They were some of the first books in which photographic prints were published. He and Roger Fenton were among the first artists to use photography as a way of recording important structures and events following the invention of calotype photography. They were both founding members of the Calotype Club. The National Monuments Record, the public archive of English Heritage holds a rare album of 47 photographs recording the building and exhibits in about 1859, these can be seen online.

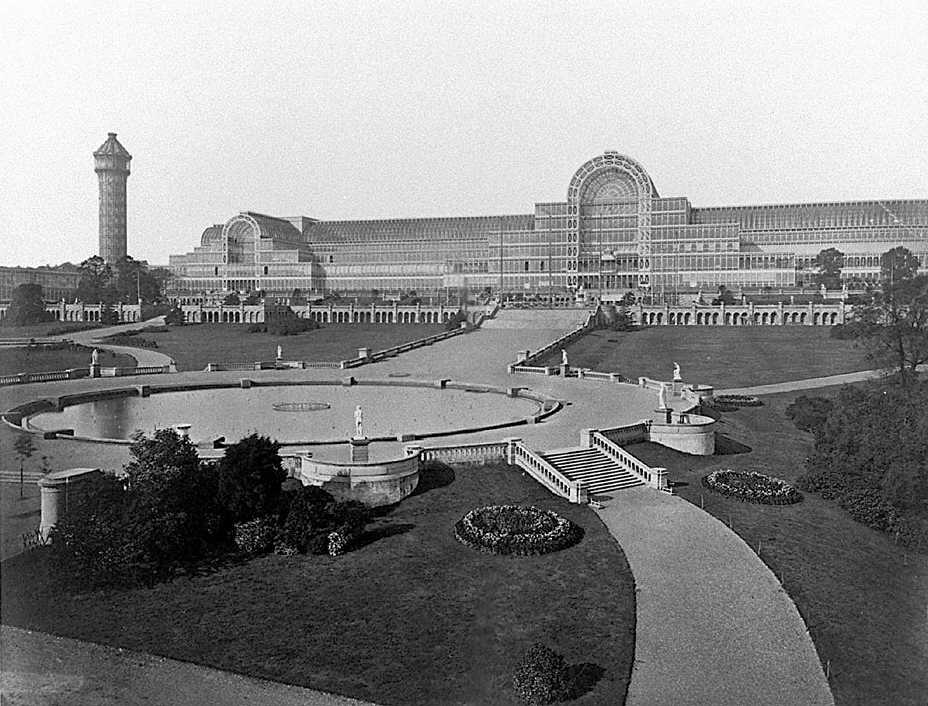
The Crystal Palace at Sydenham.

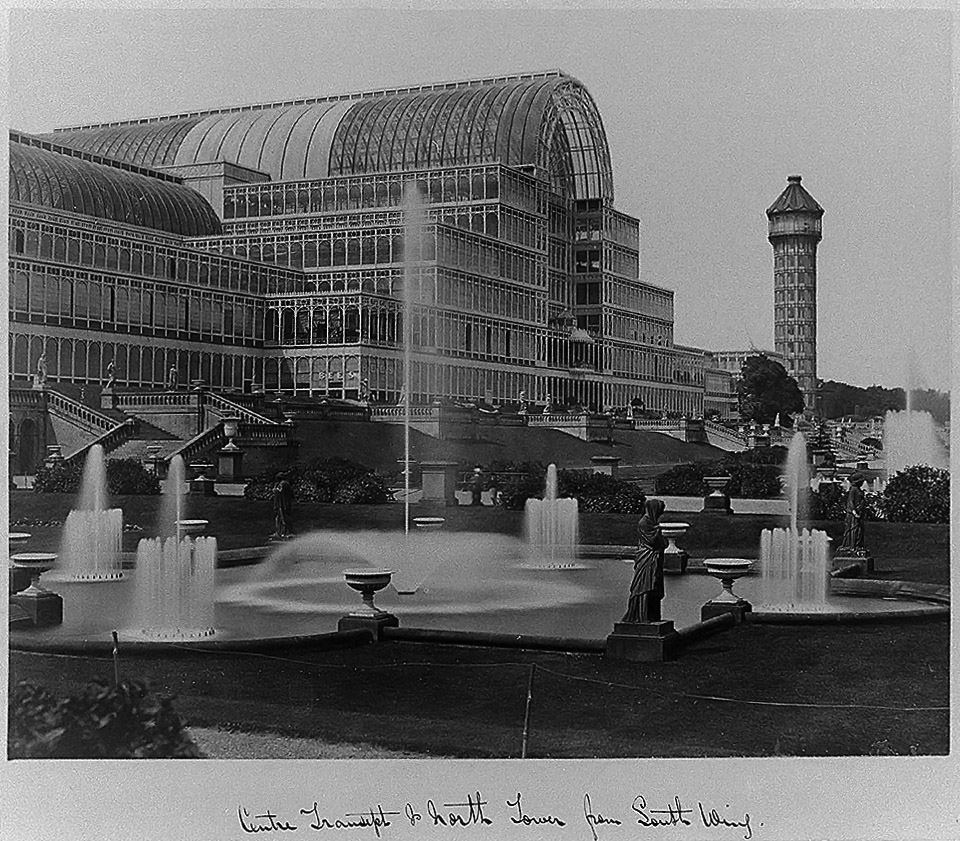
Close-up of The Crystal Palace.

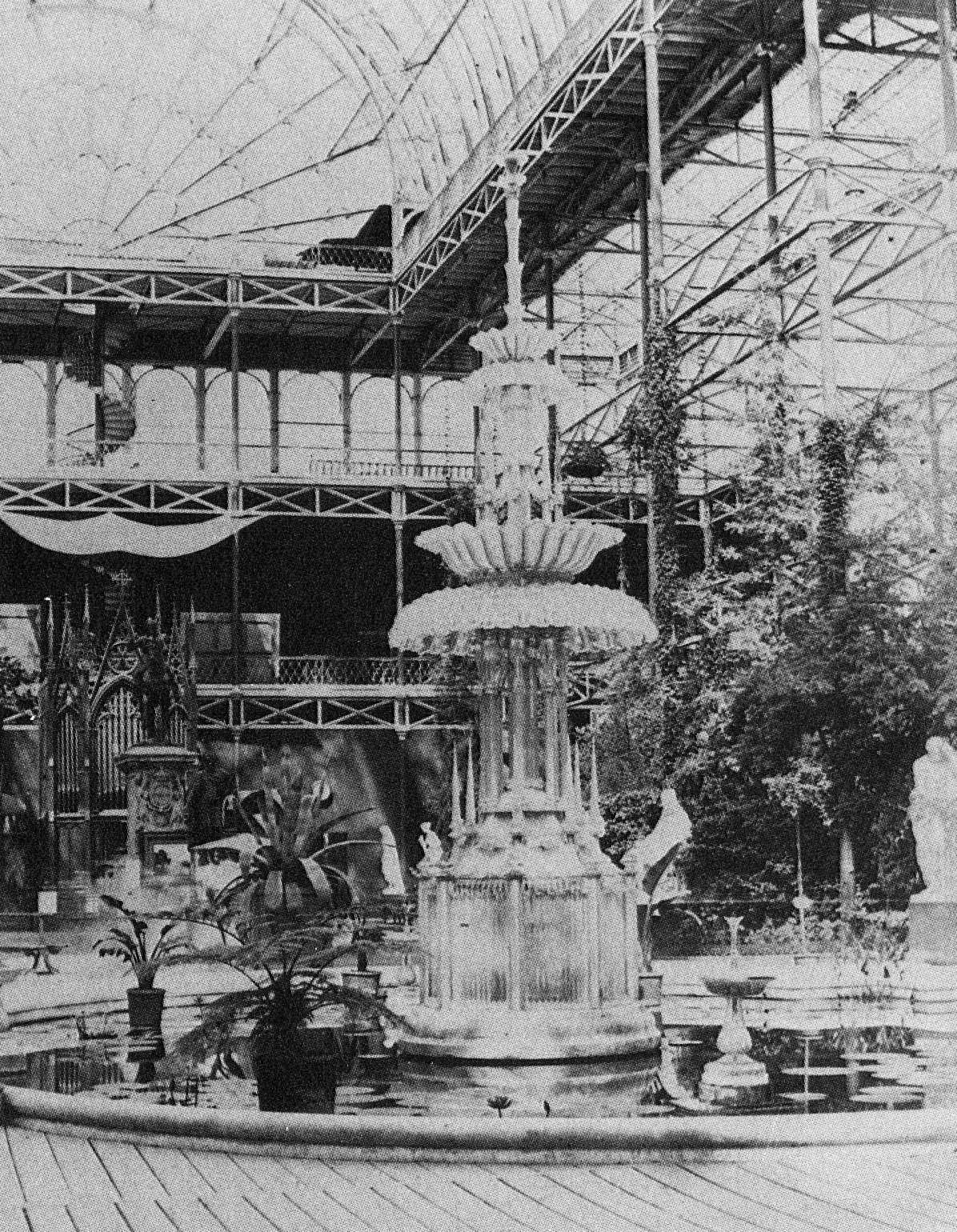
View of the interior.

== Family ==
Delamotte had four siblings; Freeman Gage Delamotte (1813–1862), Edward Delamotte (1817–1896), Louisa Delamotte (1820–1887) and Geraldine Delamotte (1826–1902).

On 4 August 1846, at Paddington, he married Ellen Maria George, a farmer's daughter. The couple had a son and five daughters, the fourth of whom — Constance George — married Henry Charles Bond in 1887. Delamotte died on 24 February 1889 at the home of his son-in-law Henry Bond in Bromley, Kent.

== See also ==
- History of photography
