= Daguerreotype =

Early photographic technique

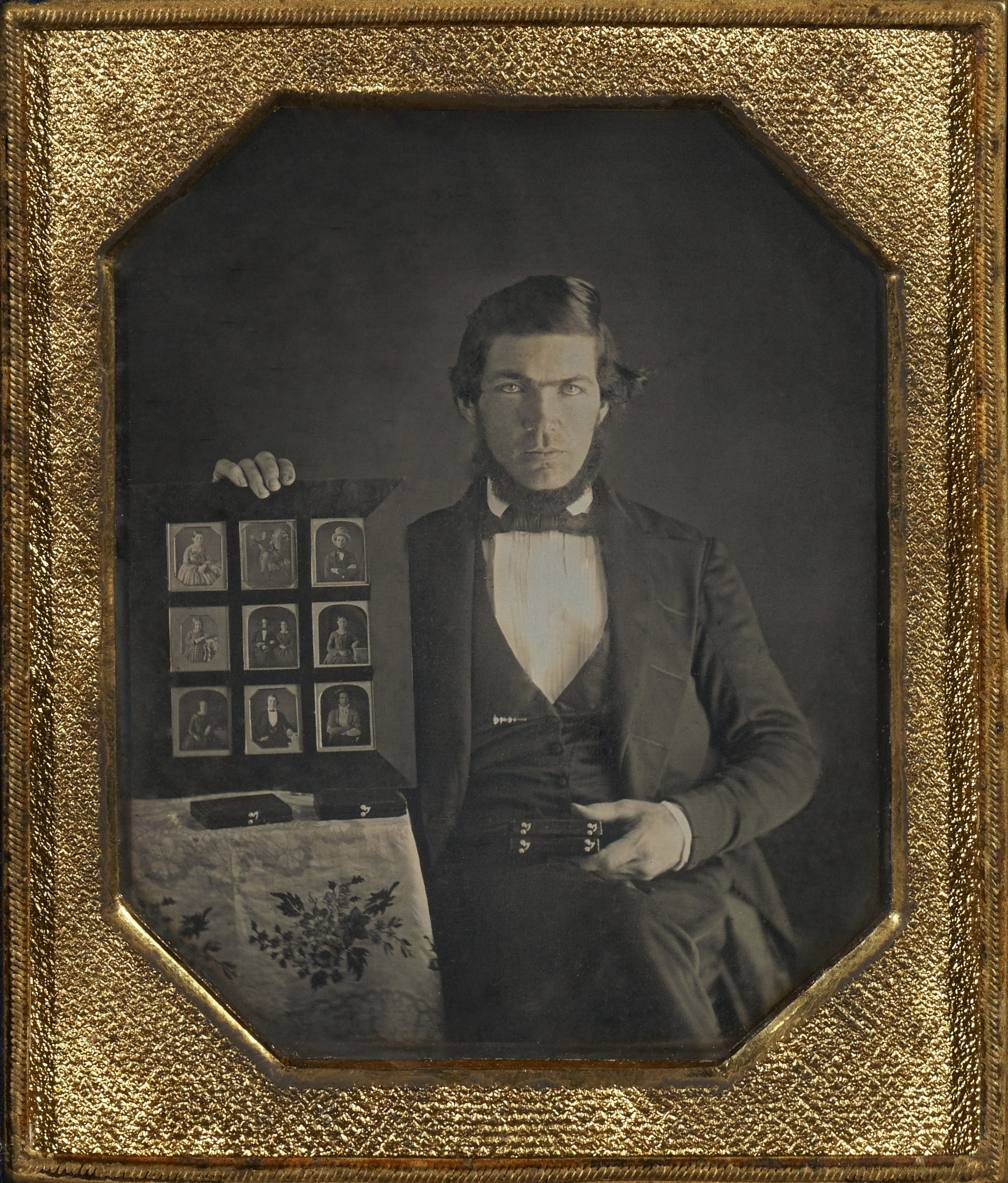
Daguerreotype portrait of a daguerreotypist displaying daguerreotypes and cases pictured in an airtight frame, 1845

Daguerreotype (Note: /dəˈɡɛər(i.)əˌtaɪp, -(i.)oʊ-/) was the first publicly available photographic process, widely used from 1830s to the year 1850. "Daguerreotype" also refers to an image created through this process.

Invented by Louis Daguerre and introduced worldwide in 1839, the daguerreotype was almost completely superseded by 1856 with new, less expensive processes, such as the ambrotype (collodion process), that yield more readily viewable images. Since the late 20th century, some photographers interested in making artistic use of early photographic processes have revived the daguerreotype process.

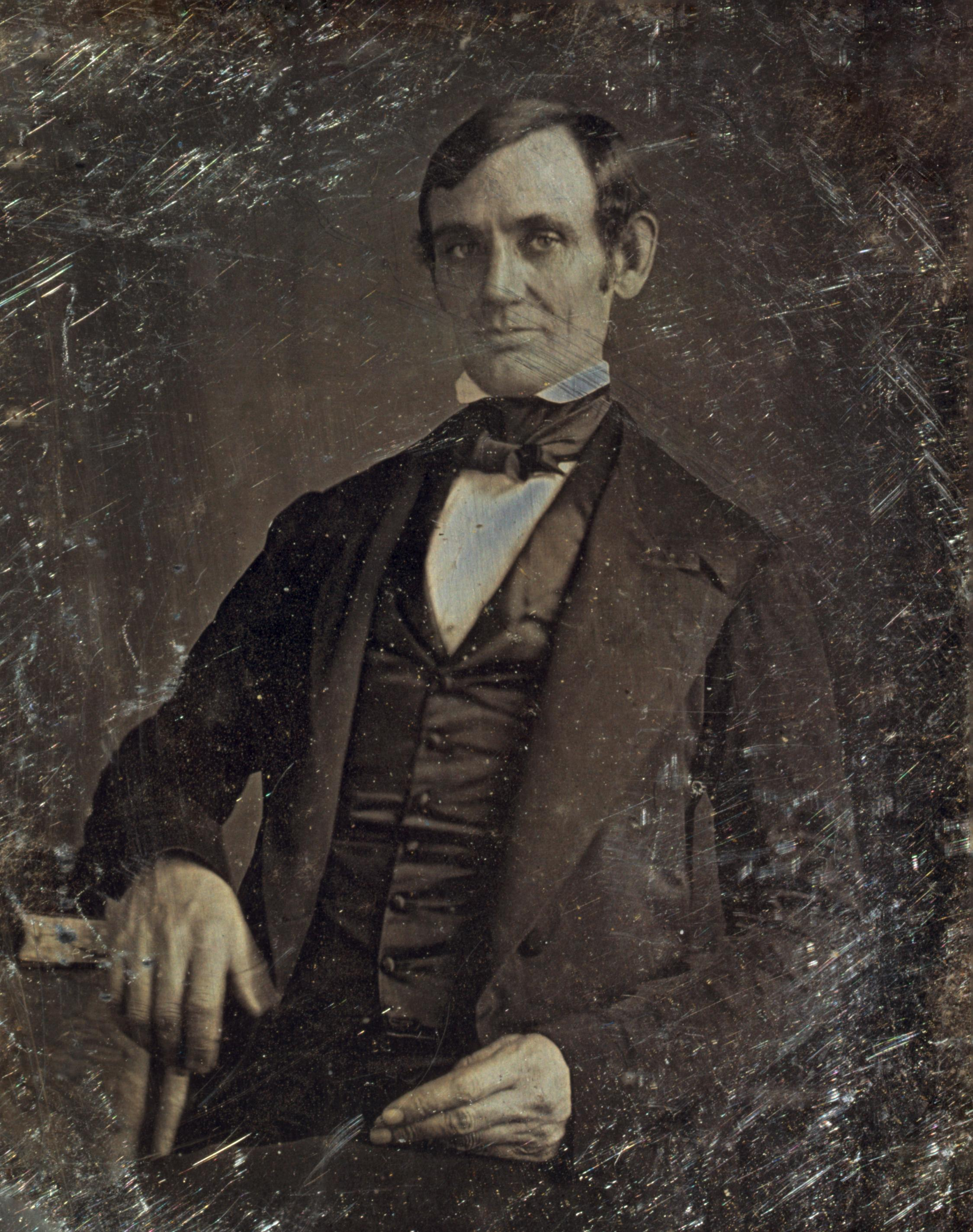
The earliest authenticated image of Abraham Lincoln, taken soon after his election to Congress in 1846, attributed to Nicholas H. Shepard

To make the image, a daguerreotypist polished a sheet of silver-plated copper to a mirror finish; treated it with fumes that made its surface light-sensitive; exposed it in a camera for as long as was judged to be necessary, which could be as little as a few seconds for brightly sunlit subjects or much longer with less intense lighting; made the resulting latent image on it visible by fuming it with mercury vapor; removed its sensitivity to light by liquid chemical treatment; rinsed and dried it; and then sealed the easily marred result behind glass in a protective enclosure.

The image is on a mirror-like silver surface and will appear either positive or negative, depending on the angle at which it is viewed, how it is lit and whether a light or dark background is being reflected in the metal. The darkest areas of the image are simply bare silver; lighter areas have a microscopically fine light-scattering texture. The surface is very delicate, and even the lightest wiping can permanently scuff it. Some tarnish around the edges is normal.

Several types of antique photographs, most often ambrotypes and tintypes, but sometimes even old prints on paper, are commonly misidentified as daguerreotypes, especially if they are in the small, ornamented cases in which daguerreotypes made in the US and the UK were usually housed. The name "daguerreotype" correctly refers only to one very specific image type and medium, the product of a process that was in wide use only from the early 1840s to the late 1850s.

== History ==
Since the Renaissance era, artists and inventors had searched for a mechanical method of capturing visual scenes. Using the camera obscura, artists would manually trace what they saw, or use the optical image as a basis for solving the problems of perspective and parallax, and deciding color values. A camera obscura optically reduces a real scene in three-dimensional space to a flat rendition in two dimensions.

In the early 17th century, the Italian physician and chemist Angelo Sala wrote that powdered silver nitrate was blackened by the sun, but did not find any practical application of the phenomenon.

The discovery and commercial availability of the halogens iodine, bromine and chlorine a few years earlier (Note: Iodine was discovered by Courtois in 1811, bromine by Löwig in 1825 and Balard in 1826 independently, and chlorine by Scheele in 1774.) meant that silver photographic processes that rely on the reduction of silver iodide, silver bromide and silver chloride to metallic silver became feasible. The daguerreotype is one of these processes, but was not the first, as Niépce had experimented with paper silver chloride negatives while Wedgwood's experiments were with silver nitrate as were Schultze's stencils of letters. Hippolyte Bayard had been persuaded by François Arago to wait before making his paper process public.

Previous discoveries of photosensitive methods and substances—including silver nitrate by Albertus Magnus in the 13th century, a silver and chalk mixture by Johann Heinrich Schulze in 1724, and Joseph Niépce's bitumen-based heliography in 1822—contributed to development of the daguerreotype.

The first reliably documented attempt to capture the image formed in a camera obscura was made by Thomas Wedgwood as early as the 1790s, but according to an 1802 account of his work by Sir Humphry Davy:

The images formed by means of a camera obscura have been found too faint to produce, in any moderate time, an effect upon the nitrate of silver. To copy these images was the first object of Mr. Wedgwood in his researches on the subject, and for this purpose he first used the nitrate of silver, which was mentioned to him by a friend, as a substance very sensible to the influence of light; but all his numerous experiments as to their primary end proved unsuccessful.

=== Development in France ===
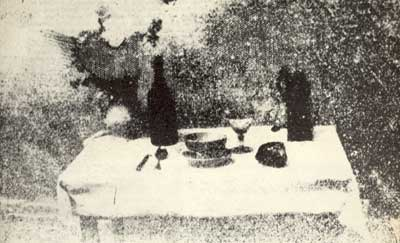
19th-century printed reproduction of a still life believed to be a c. 1832 Niépce physautotype (glass original accidentally destroyed c. 1900)

In 1829 French artist and chemist Louis Daguerre, when obtaining a camera obscura for his work on theatrical scene painting from the optician Chevalier, was put into contact with Nicéphore Niépce, who had already managed to make a record of an image from a camera obscura using the process he invented: heliography.

Daguerre met with Niépce and entered into correspondence with him. Niépce had invented an early internal combustion engine, (the Pyréolophore), together with his brother Claude and made improvements to the velocipede, as well as experimenting with lithography and related processes. Their correspondence reveals that Niépce was at first reluctant to divulge any details of his work with photographic images. To guard against letting any secrets out before the invention had been improved, they used a numerical code for security. 15, for example, signified the tanning action of the sun on human skin (action solaire sur les corps); 34 – a camera obscura (chambre noire); 73 – sulphuric acid.

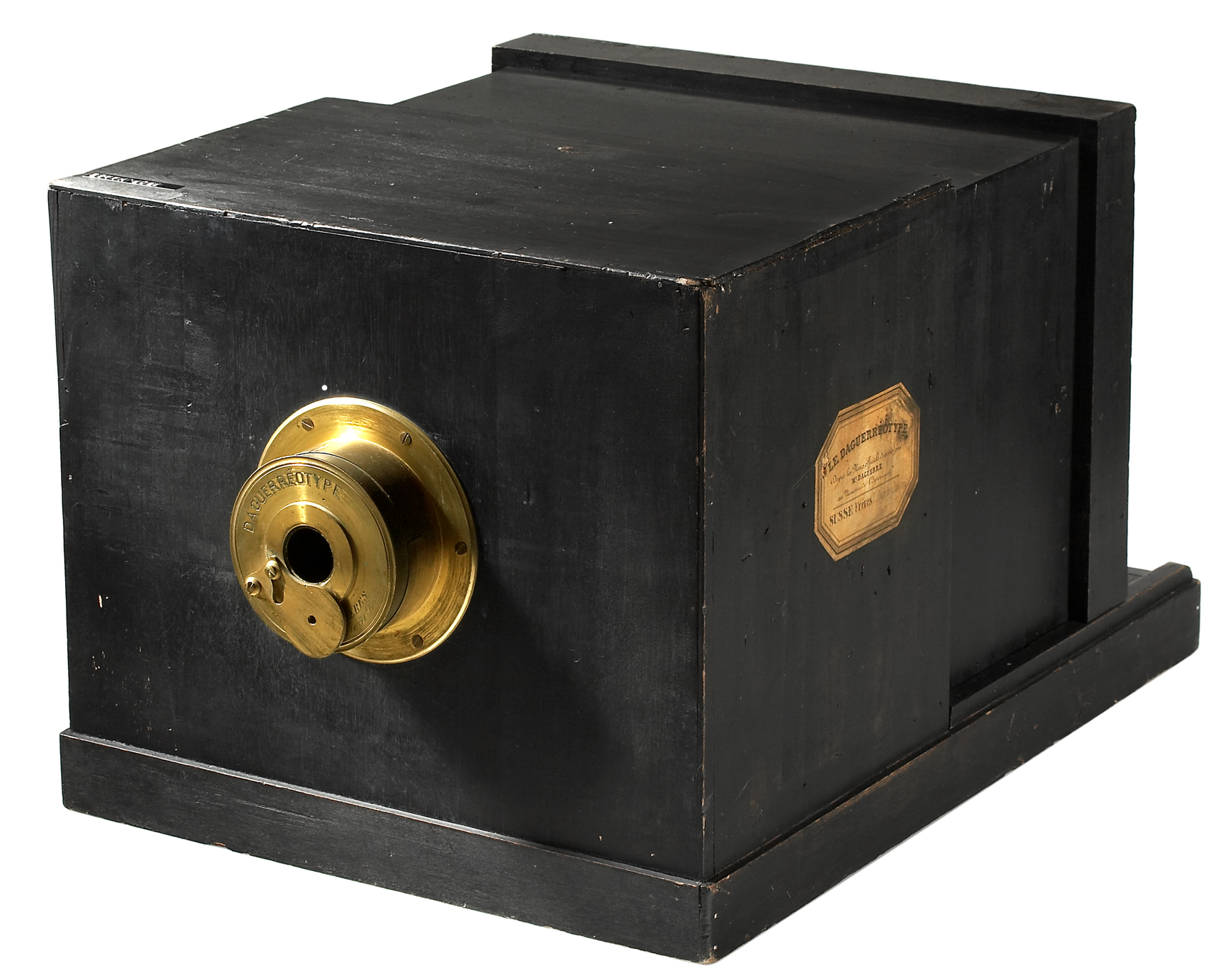
Daguerreotype camera built by La Maison Susse Frères in 1839, with a lens by Charles Chevalier

The written contract drawn up between Nicéphore Niépce and Daguerre includes an undertaking by Niépce to release details of the process he had invented – the asphalt process or heliography. Daguerre was sworn to secrecy under penalty of damages and undertook to design a camera and improve the process. The improved process was eventually named the physautotype.

Niépce's early experiments had derived from his interest in lithography and consisted of capturing the image in a camera (then called a camera obscura), resulting in an engraving that could be printed through various lithographic processes. The asphalt process or heliography required exposures that were so long that Arago said it was not fit for use. Nevertheless, without Niépce's experiments, it is unlikely that Daguerre would have been able to build on them to adapt and improve what turned out to be the daguerreotype process.

After Niépce's death in 1833, his son, Isidore, inherited rights in the contract and a new version was drawn up between Daguerre and Isidore. Isidore signed the document admitting that the old process had been improved to the limits that were possible and that a new process that would bear Daguerre's name alone was 60 to 80 times as rapid as the old asphalt (bitumen) one his father had invented. This was the daguerreotype process that used iodized silvered plates and was developed with mercury fumes.

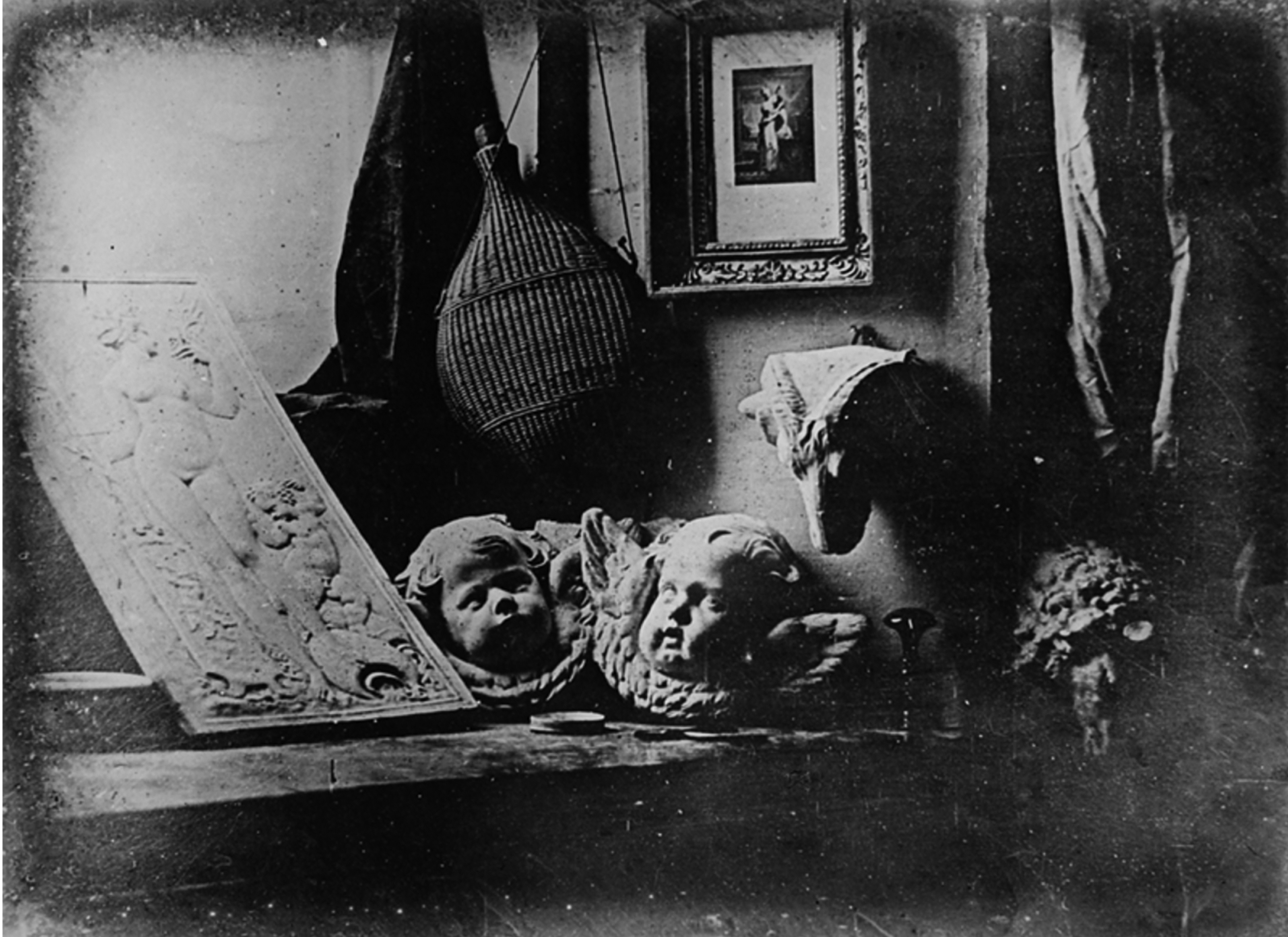
Still life with plaster casts, made by Daguerre in 1837, the earliest reliably dated daguerreotype (Note: This well-known image, now badly effaced by an attempt to clean it, is in the collection of the Société française de photographie. That institution's inventory of works by or about Daguerre Archived 2015-04-02 at the Wayback Machine (item 1) gives it the title Intérieur d'un cabinet de curiosité (Interior of a cabinet of curiosities), describes it as a whole-plate daguerreotype in a contemporary frame, states that it was acquired in 1897, came from the collection of de Cailleux (presumably, the late Alphonse de Cailleux, deputy director and then general director of the Louvre from 1836 to 1848), is annotated "Daguerre 1837" below, and on the back, in Daguerre's handwriting, bears the dedication "Epreuve ayant servi à constater la découverte du Daguerréotype, offerte à Monsieur de Cailleux par son [très] dévoué serviteur" [signed "Daguerre"] (Proof having served to verify the discovery of Daguerreotype, offered to Monsieur de Cailleux by his very devoted servant Daguerre). There is apparently no other documentary basis which might support statements found in many sources that it is the "first" or "first successful" or "first completely processed" daguerreotype, or that it was presented to de Cailleux at the Louvre in 1837 rather than at an unknown location and date after the 1839 unveiling of the process. According to the 1884 catalogue of one French museum, a framed set of three plates presented by Daguerre to François Arago bore an identically worded dedication. They were among the plates put on display to a French government body in July 1839 when it was deciding on the award of a pension to Daguerre in exchange for the still-secret details of his process.)

To exploit the invention, 400 shares would be on offer for 1,000 francs each; secrecy would be lifted after 100 shares had been sold, or the rights of the process could be bought for 20,000 francs.

Daguerre wrote to Isidore Niepce on 2 January 1839 about his discussion with Arago:

He sees difficulty with this proceeding by subscription; it is almost certain – just as I myself have been convinced ever since looking on my first specimens – that subscription would not serve. Everyone says it is superb: but it will cost us the thousand francs before we learn it [the process] and be able to judge if it could remain secret. M. de Mandelot himself knows several persons who could subscribe but will not do so because they think it [the secret] would be revealed by itself, and now I have proof that many think in this way. I entirely agree with the idea of M. Arago, that is get the government to purchase this discovery, and that he himself would pursue this in the chambre. I have already seen several deputies who are of the same opinion and would give support; this way it seems to me to have the most chance of success; thus, my dear friend, I think it is the best option, and everything makes me think we will not regret it. For a start M. Arago will speak next Monday at the Académie des Sciences ...

Isidore did not contribute anything to the invention of the Daguerreotype and he was not let in on the details of the invention. Nevertheless, he benefited from the state pension awarded to him together with Daguerre.

Miles Berry, a patent agent acting on Daguerre's and Isidore Niépce's behalf in England, wrote a six-page memorial to the Board of the Treasury in an attempt to repeat the French arrangement in Great Britain, "for the purpose of throwing it open in England for the benefit of the public."

Inform party that Parliament has placed no funds

at the disposal of the Treasury

from which a purchase of this description could be made

(indecipherable signature)

The Treasury wrote to Miles Berry on 3 April to inform him of their decision:

(To) Miles Berry Esq 66 Chancery Lane

Sir,

Having laid before the Lords &c your application on behalf of Messrs Daguerre & Niepce, that Government would purchase their Patent Right to the Invention known as the "Daguerreotype" I have it in command to acquaint you that Parliament has placed no Funds at the disposal of their Lordships from which a purchase of this description could be made

3rd April 1840 (signed) A. Gordon

(entry in margin) Application Refused

Without bills being passed by Parliament, as had been arranged in France, Arago having presented a bill in the House of Deputies and Gay-Lussac in the Chamber of Peers, there was no possibility of repeating the French arrangement in England which is why the daguerreotype was given free to the world by the French government with the exception of England and Wales for which Richard Beard controlled the patent rights.

Daguerre patented his process in England, and Richard Beard patented his improvements to the process in Scotland. During this time the astronomer and member of the House of Deputies François Arago had sought a solution whereby the invention would be given free to the world by the passing of Acts in the French Parliament. Richard Beard, controlled most of the licences in England and Wales with the exception of Antoine Claudet who had purchased a licence directly from Daguerre.

In the US, Alexander S. Wolcott invented the mirror daguerreotype camera, according to John Johnson's account, in one single day after reading the description of the daguerreotype process published in English translation.

Johnson's father travelled to England with some specimen portraits to patent the camera and met with Richard Beard who bought the patent for the camera, and a year later bought the patent for the daguerreotype outright. Johnson assisted Beard in setting up a portrait studio on the roof of the Regent Street Polytechnic and managed Beard's daguerreotype studio in Derby and then Manchester for some time before returning to the US.

Wolcott's Mirror Camera, which gave postage stamp sized miniatures, was in use for about two years before it was replaced by Petzval's Portrait lens, which gave larger and sharper images.

Antoine Claudet had purchased a licence from Daguerre directly to produce daguerreotypes. His uncle, the banker Vital Roux, arranged that he should head the glass factory at Choisy-le-Roi together with Georges Bontemps and moved to England to represent the factory with a showroom in High Holborn. At one stage, Beard sued Claudet with the aim of claiming that he had a monopoly of daguerreotypy in England, but lost. Niépce's aim originally had been to find a method to reproduce prints and drawings for lithography. He had started out experimenting with light-sensitive materials and had made a contact print from a drawing and then went on to successfully make the first photomechanical record of an image in a camera obscura – the world's first photograph. Niépce's method was to coat a pewter plate with bitumen of Judea (asphalt) and the action of the light differentially hardened the bitumen. The plate was washed with a mixture of oil of lavender and turpentine leaving a relief image. Later, Daguerre's and Niépce's improvement to the heliograph process, the physautotype, reduced the exposure to eight hours.

Early experiments required hours of exposure in the camera to produce visible results. Modern photo-historians consider the stories of Daguerre discovering mercury development by accident because of a bowl of mercury left in a cupboard, or, alternatively, a broken thermometer, to be spurious.

Another story of a fortunate accident, which modern photo historians are now doubtful about, and was related by Louis Figuier, of a silver spoon lying on an iodized silver plate which left its design on the plate by light perfectly. Noticing this, Daguerre supposedly wrote to Niépce on 21 May 1831 suggesting the use of iodized silver plates as a means of obtaining light images in the camera.

Daguerre did not give a clear account of his method of discovery and allowed these legends to become current after the secrecy had been lifted.

Letters from Niépce to Daguerre dated 24 June and 8 November 1831, show that Niépce was unsuccessful in obtaining satisfactory results following Daguerre's suggestion, although he had produced a negative on an iodized silver plate in the camera. Niépce's letters to Daguerre dated 29 January and 3 March 1832 show that the use of iodized silver plates was due to Daguerre and not Niépce.

Jean-Baptiste Dumas, who was president of the National Society for the Encouragement of Science (Société d'encouragement pour l'industrie nationale) and a chemist, put his laboratory at Daguerre's disposal. According to Austrian chemist Josef Maria Eder, Daguerre was not versed in chemistry and it was Dumas who suggested Daguerre use sodium hyposulfite, discovered by Herschel in 1819, as a fixer to dissolve the unexposed silver salts.

== First mention in print (1835) and public announcement (1839) ==
A paragraph tacked onto the end of a review of one of Daguerre's Diorama spectacles in the Journal des artistes on 27 September 1835, a Diorama painting of a landslide that occurred in "La Vallée de Goldau", made passing mention of rumour that was going around the Paris studios of Daguerre's attempts to make a visual record on metal plates of the fleeting image produced by the camera obscura:

It is said that Daguerre has found the means to collect, on a plate prepared by him, the image produced by the camera obscura, in such a way that a portrait, a landscape, or any view, projected upon this plate by the ordinary camera obscura, leaves an imprint in light and shade there, and thus presents the most perfect of all drawings ... a preparation put over this image preserves it for an indefinite time ... the physical sciences have perhaps never presented a marvel comparable to this one.

A further clue to fixing the date of invention of the process is that when the Paris correspondent of the London periodical The Athenaeum reported the public announcement of the daguerreotype in 1839, he mentioned that the daguerreotypes now being produced were of considerably better quality than the ones he had seen "four years earlier".

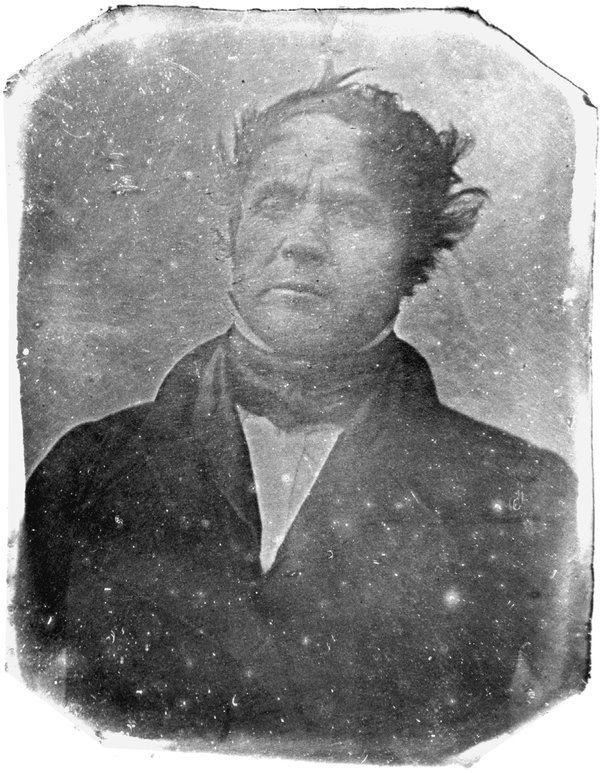
Daguerreotype possibly made in 1837 by Daguerre. The subject is believed to be Constant Huet, who worked at the Natural History Museum, where Daguerre took pictures in 1837. If correct, this would be the oldest surviving portrait photograph of a person.

The father of Viollet-le-Duc wrote in September 1836 that he saw a photograph made by Daguerre from the top of his diorama. The picture showed the hills of Montmartre. With a weak magnifying glass it was possible to distinguish the details of the telegraph tower more than one and a half miles away. In April 1837, Daguerre remarked to Isidore Niépce that his equipment for taking daguerreotypes was ready, and the only thing he needed was good weather.

At a joint meeting of the French Academy of Sciences and the Académie des Beaux-Arts held at the Institut de Françe on Monday, 19 August 1839 François Arago briefly referred to the earlier process that Niépce had developed and Daguerre had helped to improve without mentioning them by name (the heliograph and the physautotype) in rather disparaging terms stressing their inconvenience and disadvantages such as that exposures were so long as eight hours that required a full day's exposure during which time the sun had moved across the sky removing all trace of halftones or modelling in round objects, and the photographic layer was apt to peel off in patches, while praising the daguerreotype in glowing terms. Overlooking Nicéphore Niépce's contribution in this way led Niépce's son, Isidore to resent his father being ignored as having been the first to capture the image produced in a camera by chemical means, and Isidore wrote a pamphlet in defence of his father's reputation Histoire de la découverte improprement nommé daguerréotype ("History of the discovery improperly named the daguerreotype").

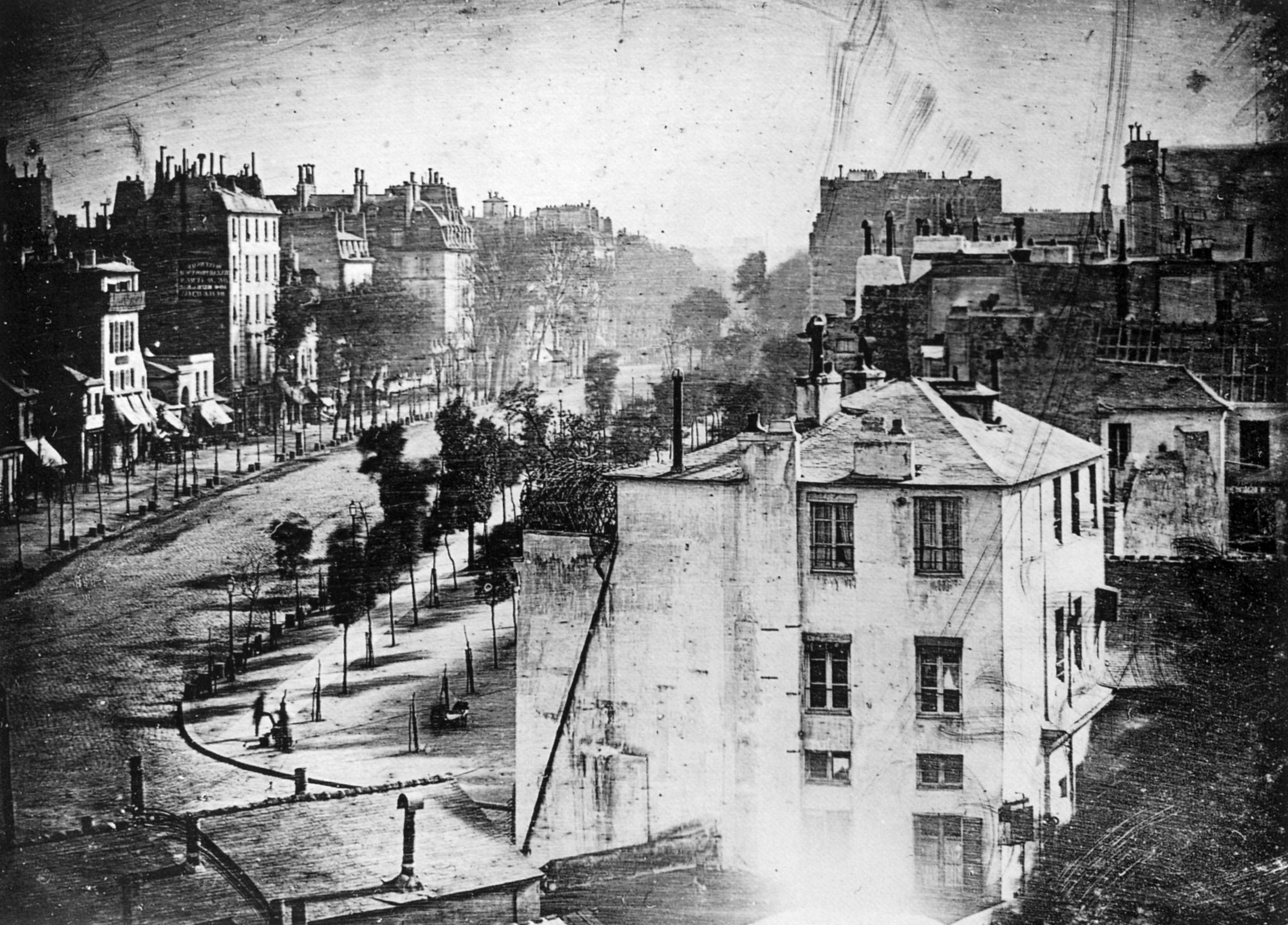
First cultural landscape photography, View of the Boulevard du Temple was taken by Daguerre one spring morning in 1837 or 1838 from the window of the Diorama, where he lived and worked. It bears the caption huit heures du matin (translation: 8 a.m.). (Note: Though it shows the busy Boulevard du Temple, the long exposure time (about ten or twelve minutes) meant that moving traffic cannot be seen; however, the bootblack and his customer at lower left remained still long enough to be distinctly visible. The building signage at the upper left shows that the image is laterally (left-right) reversed, as were most daguerreotypes. Daguerre presented this daguerreotype together with two others: a still-life and a view from the same window labelled midi (noon) to King Ludwig I of Bavaria (The Munich Triptych) in order to publicise his invention. All three daguerreotypes were destroyed by cleaning in 1974 but they are preserved in reproduction.)

Daguerre was present but complained of a sore throat. Later that year, William Fox Talbot announced his silver chloride "sensitive paper" process. (Note: Talbot's early "sensitive paper" or "photogenic drawing" process, which required very long camera exposures, should not be confused with the much more practical Calotype or Talbotype process, invented in 1840 and introduced in 1841.)

Together, these announcements caused early commentators to choose 1839 as the year photography was born, or made public. Later, it became known that Niépce's role had been downplayed in Arago's efforts to publicize the daguerreotype, and the first photograph is recorded in Eder's History of Photography as having been taken in 1826 or 1827. Niépce's reputation as the real inventor of photography became known through his son Isidore's indignation that his father's early experiments had been overlooked or ignored although Nicéphore had revealed his process, which, at the time, was secret.

The phrase the birth of photography has been used by different authors to mean different things — either the publicizing of the process (in 1839) as a metaphor to indicate that previous to that the daguerreotype process had been kept secret; or, the date the first photograph was taken by or with a camera (using the asphalt process or heliography), thought to have been 1822, but Eder's research indicates that the date was more probably 1826 or later. Fox Talbot's first photographs, on the other hand, were made "in the brilliant summer of 1835."

Daguerre and Niépce had together signed a good agreement in which remuneration for the invention would be paid for by subscription. However, the campaign they launched to finance the invention failed. François Arago, whose views on the system of patenting inventions can be gathered from speeches he made later in the House of Deputies (he apparently thought the English patent system had advantages over the French one) did not think the idea of raising money by subscription to be a good one, and supported Daguerre by arranging for motions to be passed in both Houses of the French parliament.

Daguerre did not patent and profit from his invention in the usual way. Instead, it was arranged that the French government would acquire the rights in exchange for lifetime pensions to Daguerre and to Niépce's son and heir, Isidore. The government would then present the daguerreotype process "free to the world" as a gift, which it did on 19 August 1839. However, five days previous to this, Miles Berry, a patent agent acting on Daguerre's behalf filed for patent No. 8194 of 1839: "A New or Improved Method of Obtaining the Spontaneous Reproduction of all the Images Received in the Focus of the Camera Obscura". The patent applied to "England, Wales, and the town of Berwick-upon-Tweed, and in all her Majesty's Colonies and Plantations abroad". This was the usual wording of English patent specifications before 1852. It was only after the 1852 Act, which unified the patent systems of England, Ireland and Scotland, that a single patent protection was automatically extended to the whole of the British Isles, including the Channel Isles and the Isle of Man. Richard Beard bought the patent rights from Miles Berry, and also obtained a Scottish patent, which he apparently did not enforce. The United Kingdom and the "Colonies and Plantations abroad" therefore became the only places where a license was legally required to make and sell daguerreotypes.

Although Daguerre's early work survived when his studio caught fire on 8 March 1839, while the painter Samuel Morse was visiting from the US, fewer than 25 of them are known to be around today.

== Camera obscura ==
The camera obscura (Latin for "dark chamber") in its simplest form is a naturally occurring phenomenon.

A broad-leaved tree in bright sunshine will provide conditions that fulfill the requirements of a pinhole camera or a camera obscura: a bright light source (the sun), the shade that the leafy canopy provides, a flat surface onto which the image is projected and holes formed by the gaps between the leaves. The sun's image will show as a round disc, and, in a partial eclipse, as a crescent.

A clear description of a camera obscura is given by Leonardo da Vinci in Codex Atlanticus (1502): (he called it oculus artificialis which means "the artificial eye")

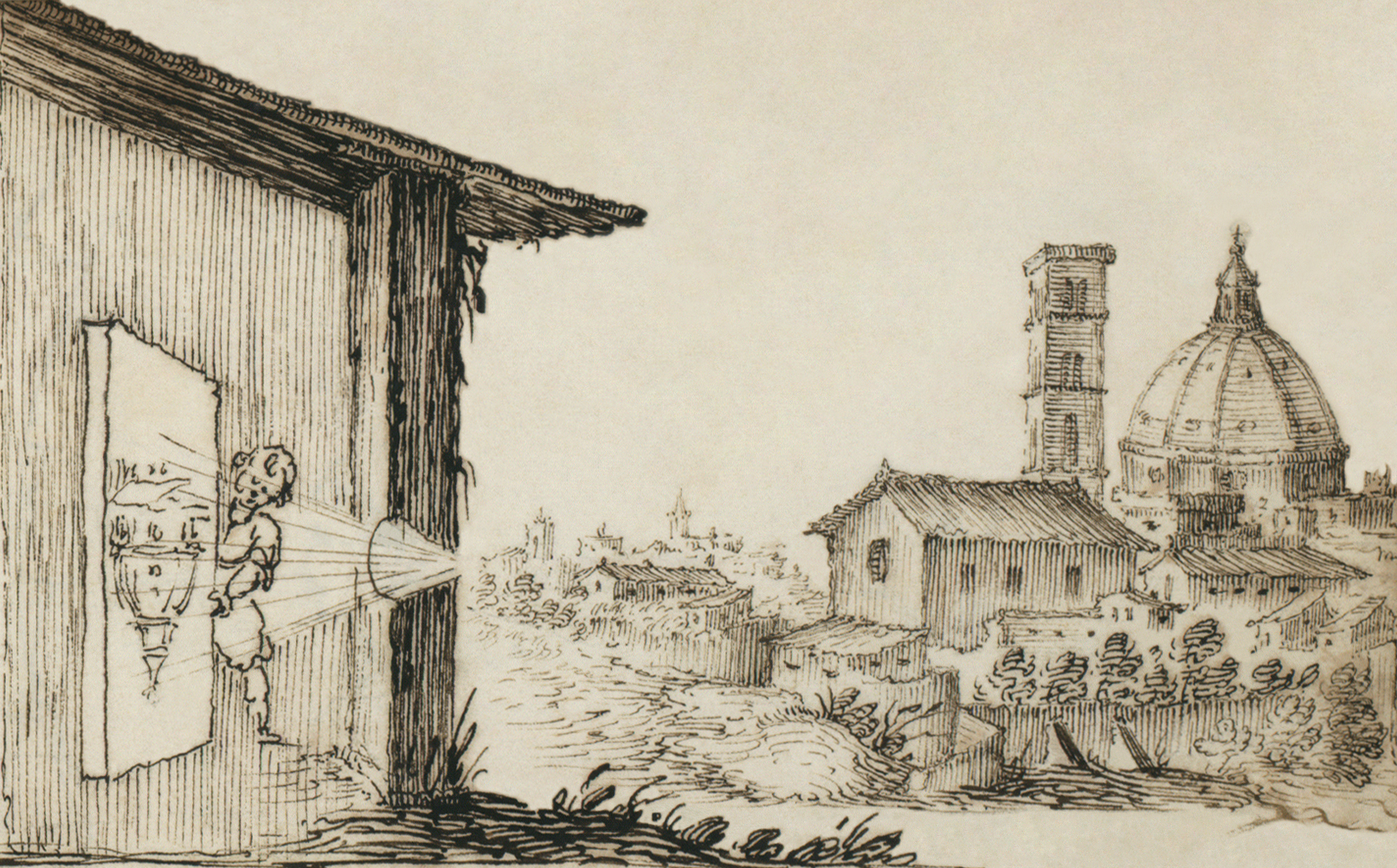
Camera obscura, from a manuscript of military designs. 17th century, possibly Italian

If the facade of a building, or a place, or a landscape is illuminated by the sun and a small hole is drilled in the wall of a room in a building facing this, which is not directly lighted by the sun, then all objects illuminated by the sun will send their images through this aperture and will appear, upside down, on the wall facing the hole.

In another notebook, he wrote:

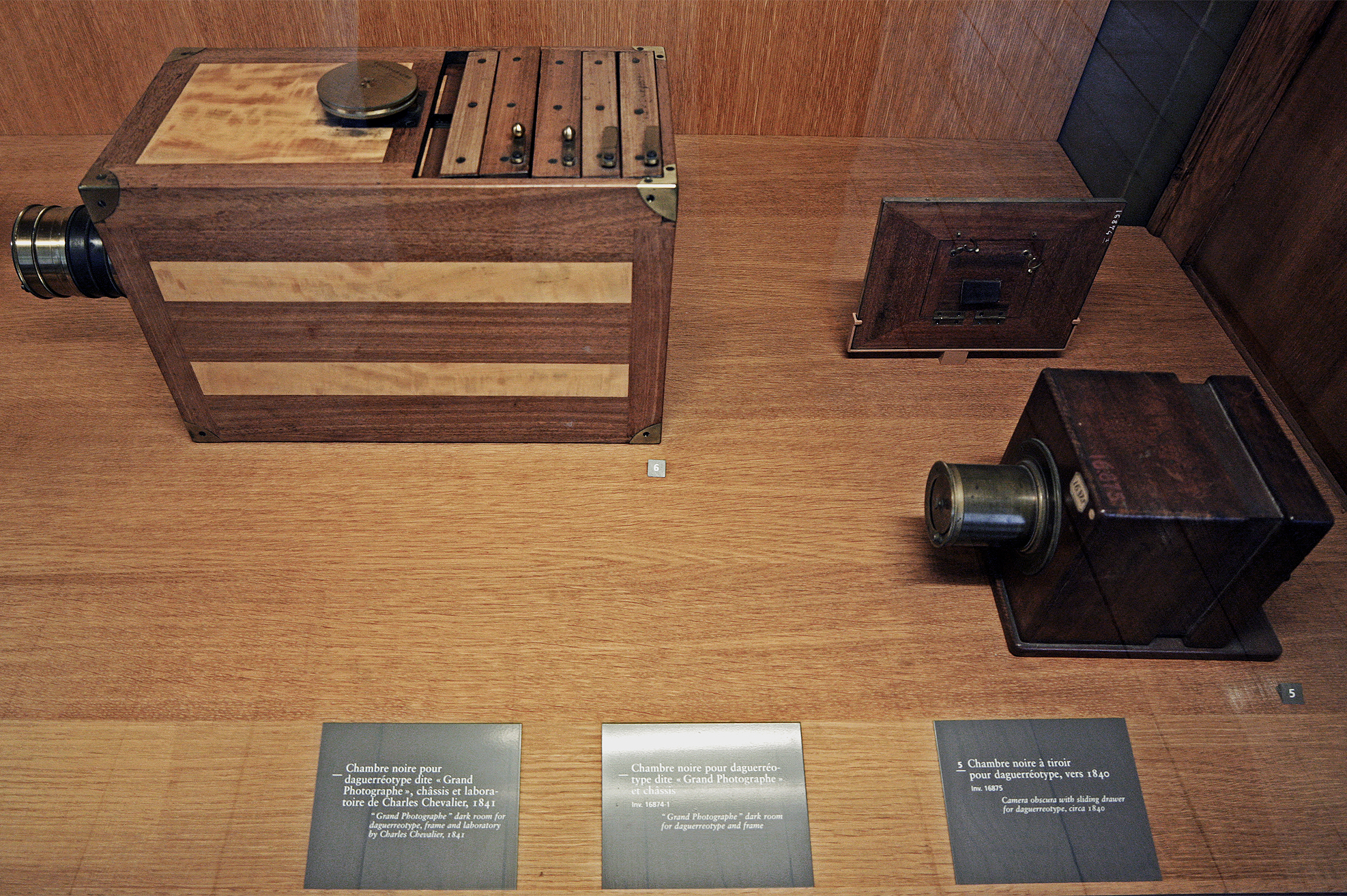
1840–1841 camerae obscurae and plates for daguerreotype called "Grand Photographe" produced by Charles Chevalier (Musée des Arts et Métiers)

You will catch these pictures on a piece of white paper, which placed vertically in the room not far from that opening, and you will see all the above-mentioned objects on this paper in their natural shapes or colors, but they will appear smaller and upside down, on account of crossing of the rays at that aperture. If these pictures originate from a place which is illuminated by the sun, they will appear colored on the paper exactly as they are. The paper should be very thin and must be viewed from the back.

In the 16th century, Daniele Barbaro suggested replacing the small hole with a larger hole and an old man's spectacle lens (a biconvex lens for correcting long-sightedness), which produced a much brighter and sharper image.

By the late 18th century, small, easily portable box-form units equipped with a simple lens, an internal mirror, and a ground glass screen had become popular among affluent amateurs for making sketches of landscapes and architecture. The camera was pointed at the scene and steadied, a sheet of thin paper was placed on top of the ground glass, then a pencil or pen could be used to trace over the image projected from within. The beautiful but emphemeral little light-paintings on the screen inspired several people to seek some way of capturing them more completely and effectively—and automatically—by means of chemistry.

Daguerre, a skilled professional artist, was familiar with the camera obscura as an aid for establishing correct proportion and perspective, sometimes very useful when planning out the celebrated theatrical scene backdrops he painted and the even larger ultra-realistic panoramas he exhibited in his popular Diorama.

== Process ==
The chemistry of the daguerreotype resembles the modern gelatin silver process, beginning with silver halides which are formed in darkness before being exposed to light, forming a latent image which is then developed into a visible form, before being fixed using sodium thiosulfate ("hypo"). The notable distinguishing features of the daguerreotype process are the formation of silver halides directly on a surface of metallic silver, and the development by exposure to mercury vapour.

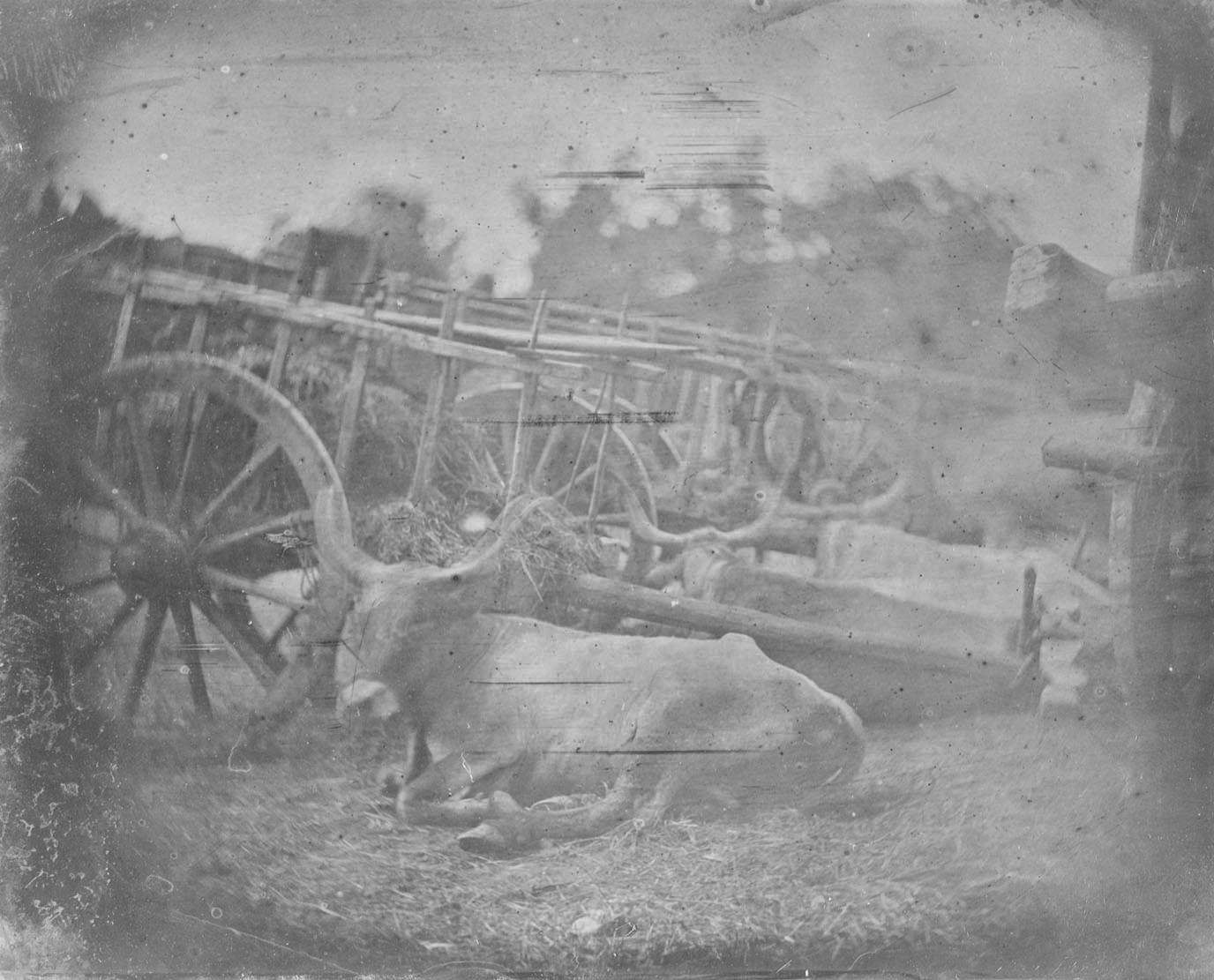
The earliest known photograph of a living animal (excluding humans). This daguerreotype was taken by French photographer Joseph-Philibert Girault de Prangey while visiting Rome between April and July 1842.

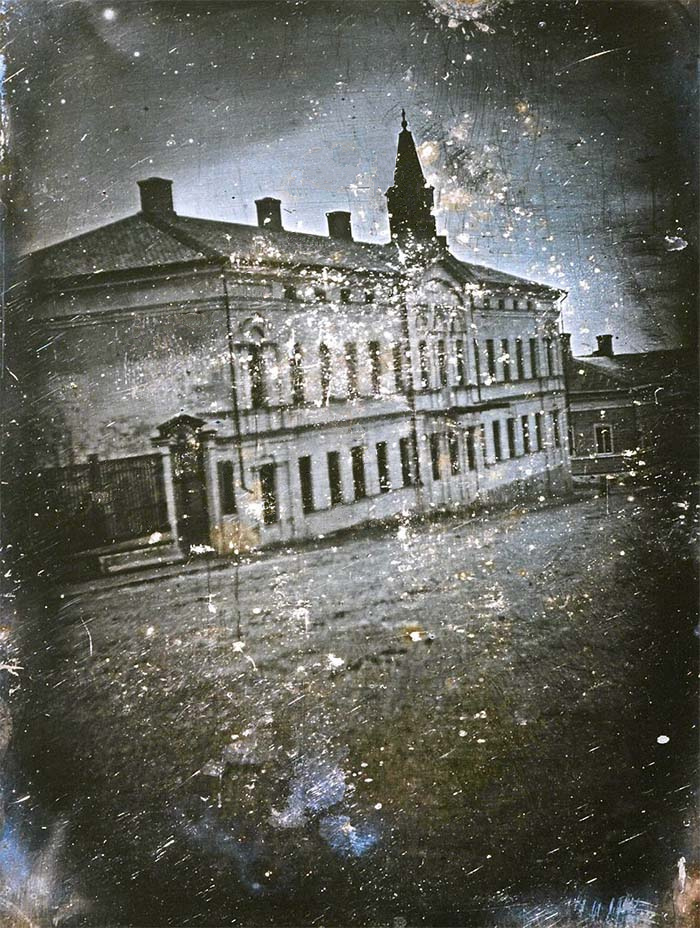
A daguerreotype photograph of the Nobel House in Turku from 1842

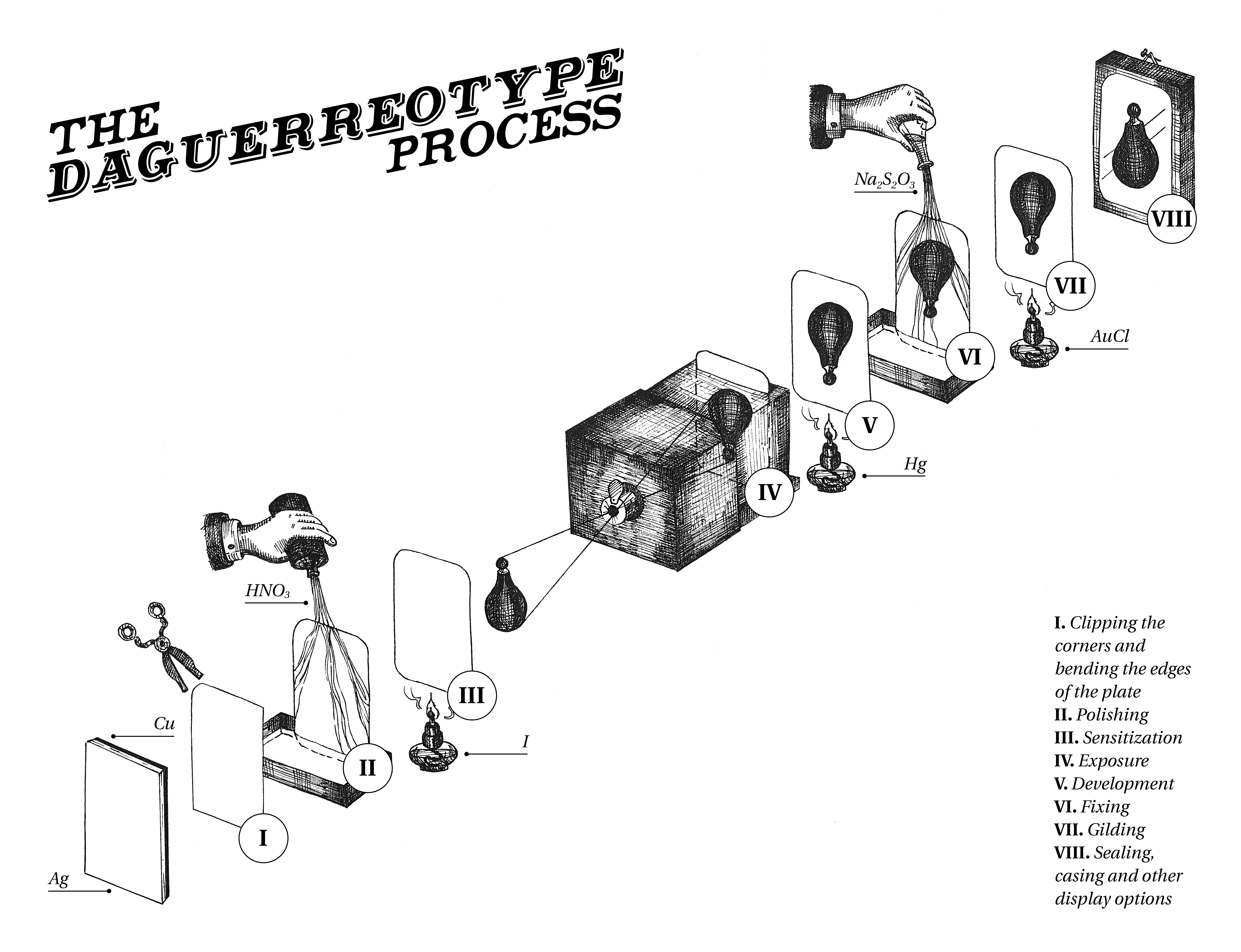
Graphic representation of the steps involved in making a daguerreotype

=== Plate manufacture ===
The daguerreotype image is formed on a highly polished silver surface. Usually the silver is a thin layer on a copper substrate, but other metals such as brass can be used for the substrate and daguerreotypes can also be made on solid silver sheets. A surface of very pure silver is preferable, but sterling (92.5% pure) or US coin (90% pure) or even lower grades of silver are functional. In 19th century practice, the usual stock material, Sheffield plate, was produced by a process sometimes called plating by fusion. A sheet of sterling silver was heat-fused onto the top of a thick copper ingot. When the ingot was repeatedly rolled under pressure to produce thin sheets, the relative thicknesses of the two layers of metal remained constant. The alternative was to electroplate a layer of pure silver onto a bare copper sheet. The two technologies were sometimes combined, the Sheffield plate being given a finishing coat of pure silver by electroplating.

In order that the corners of the plate would not tear the buffing material when the plate was polished, the edges of the plate were bent back using patented devices that could also serve as plate holders to avoid touching the surface of the plate during processing.

==== Polishing ====
To optimize the image quality of the end product, the silver side of the plate had to be polished to as nearly perfect a mirror finish as possible. The silver had to be completely free of tarnish or other contamination when it was sensitized, so the daguerreotypist had to perform at least the final portion of the polishing and cleaning operation not too long before use.

In the 19th century, the polishing was done with a buff covered with hide or velvet, first using rotten stone, then jeweler's rouge, then lampblack. Originally, the work was entirely manual, but buffing machinery was soon devised to assist. Finally, the surface was swabbed with nitric acid to burn off any residual organic matter.

==== Sensitization ====
In darkness, or by the light of a safelight, the silver surface was exposed to halogen fumes to form a silver halide. Originally, only iodine fumes (from iodine crystals at room temperature) were used, producing a surface coating of silver iodide, but it was soon found that a subsequent exposure to bromine fumes greatly increased the sensitivity of the silver halide coating. Exposure to chlorine fumes, or a combination of bromine and chlorine fumes, could also be used. A final re-fuming with iodine was typical.

=== Exposure ===
The plate was then carried to the camera in a light-tight plate holder. Withdrawing a protective dark slide or opening a pair of doors in the holder exposed the sensitized surface within the dark camera and removing a cap from the camera lens began the exposure, creating an invisible latent image on the plate. Depending on the sensitization chemistry used, the brightness of the lighting, and the light-concentrating power of the lens, the required exposure time ranged from a few seconds to many minutes. After the exposure was judged to be complete, the lens was capped and the holder was again made light-tight and removed from the camera.

=== Development ===
The latent image was developed to visibility by several minutes of exposure to the fumes given off by heated mercury in a purpose-made developing box.

The toxicity of mercury was well known in the 19th century, but precautionary measures were rarely taken. Today, however, the hazards of contact with mercury and other chemicals traditionally used in the daguerreotype process are taken more seriously, as is the risk of release of those chemicals into the environment.

==== Becquerel variation ====
In the Becquerel variation of the process, published in 1840 but very rarely used in the 19th century, the plate, sensitized by fuming with iodine alone, was developed by overall exposure to sunlight passing through yellow, amber or red glass. The silver iodide in its unexposed condition was insensitive to the red end of the visible spectrum of light and was unaffected, but the latent image created in the camera by the blue, violet and ultraviolet rays color-sensitized each point on the plate proportionally, so that this color-filtered "sunbath" intensified it to full visibility, as if the plate had been exposed in the camera for hours or days to produce a visible image without development. Becquerel daguerreotypes, when fully developed and fixed, typically take on a somewhat bluish hue. The image quality may not be as magnificently sharp as a daguerreotype developed using mercury vapor, although modern photographers pursuing daguerreotypy tend to favor the Becquerel process due to the hazards and expense of working with mercury.

=== Fixing ===
After development, the light sensitivity of the plate was arrested by removing the unexposed silver halide with a mild solution of sodium thiosulfate; Daguerre's initial method was to use a hot saturated solution of common salt.

Gilding, also called gold toning, was an addition to Daguerre's process introduced by Hippolyte Fizeau in 1840. It soon became part of the standard procedure. To give the steely gray image a slightly warmer tone and physically reinforce the powder-like silver particles of which it was composed, a gold chloride solution was pooled onto the surface and the plate was briefly heated over a flame, then drained, rinsed and dried. Without this treatment, the image was as delicate as the "dust" on a butterfly's wing.

== Casing and other display options ==
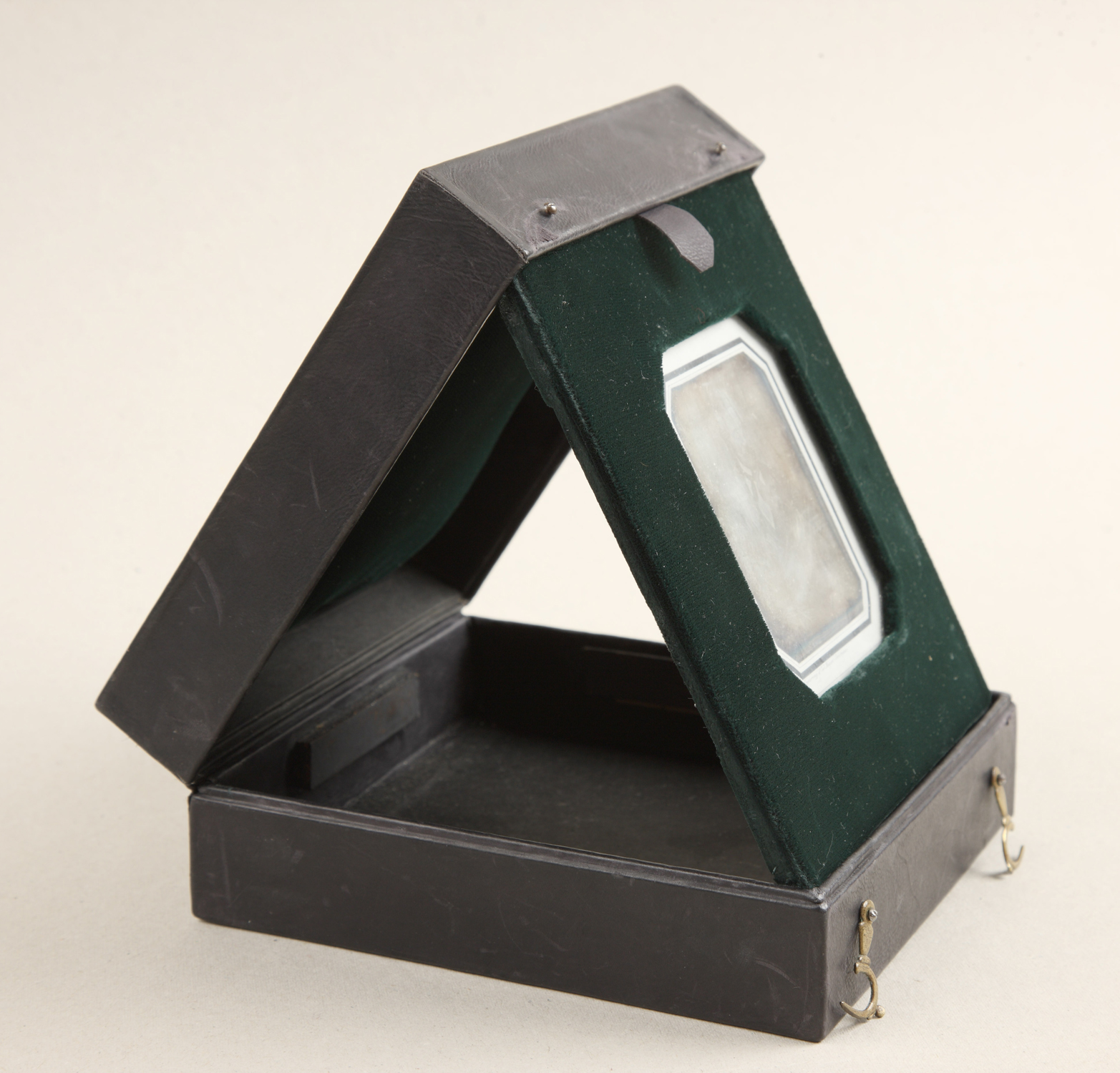
Daguerreotype mounted on a box, in the National Archives of Estonia

Even when strengthened by gilding, the image surface was still very easily marred and air would tarnish the silver, so the finished plate was bound up with a protective cover glass and sealed with strips of paper soaked in gum arabic. In the US and UK, a gilt brass mat called a preserver in the US and a pinchbeck in Britain, was normally used to separate the image surface from the glass. In continental Europe, a thin cardboard mat or passepartout usually served that purpose.

There were two main methods of finishing daguerreotypes for protection and display:

In the US and Britain, the tradition of preserving miniature paintings in a wooden case covered with leather or paper stamped with a relief pattern continued through to the daguerreotype. Some daguerreotypists were portrait artists who also offered miniature portraits. Black-lacquered cases ornamented with inset mother of pearl were sometimes used. The more substantial Union case was made from a mixture of colored sawdust and shellac (the main component of wood varnish) formed in a heated mold to produce a decorative sculptural relief. The word "Union" referred to the sawdust and varnish mixture — the manufacture of Union cases began in 1856. In all types of cases, the inside of the cover was lined with velvet or plush or satin to provide a dark surface to reflect into the plate for viewing and to protect the cover glass. Some cases, however, held two daguerreotypes opposite each other. The cased images could be set out on a table or displayed on a mantelpiece. Most cases were small and lightweight enough to easily carry in a pocket, although that was not normally done. The other approach, common in France and the rest of continental Europe, was to hang the daguerreotype on the wall in a frame, either simple or elaborate.

Conservators were able to determine that a daguerreotype of Walt Whitman was made in New Orleans with the main clue being the type of frame, which was made for wall hanging in the French and continental style. Supporting evidence of the New Orleans origin was a scrap of paper from Le Mesager, a New Orleans bilingual newspaper of the time, which had been used to glue the plate into the frame. Other clues used by historians to identify daguerreotypes are hallmarks in the silver plate and the distinctive patterns left by different photographers when polishing the plate with a leather buff, which leaves extremely fine parallel lines discernible on the surface.

As the daguerreotype itself is on a relatively thin sheet of soft metal, it was easily sheared down to sizes and shapes suited for mounting into lockets, as was done with miniature paintings. Other imaginative uses of daguerreotype portraits were to mount them in watch fobs and watch cases, jewel caskets and other ornate silver or gold boxes, the handles of walking sticks, and in brooches, bracelets and other jewelry now referred to by collectors as "daguerreian jewelry". The cover glass or crystal was sealed either directly to the edges of the daguerreotype or to the opening of its receptacle and a protective hinged cover was usually provided.

== Unusual characteristics ==
Daguerreotypes are normally laterally reversed—mirror images—because they are necessarily viewed from the side that originally faced the camera lens. A helpful indicator of whether the daguerreotype has been flipped is that men's garments button left over right whereas the opposite is true for women's. Although a daguerreotypist could attach a mirror or reflective prism in front of the lens to obtain a right-reading result, in practice this was rarely done. Although daguerreotypes are unique images, they could be copied by re-daguerreotyping the original, a process which also fixes the mirror-image effect. Copies were also produced by lithography or engraving. Today, they can be digitally scanned.

The use of either type of attachment caused some light loss, somewhat increasing the required exposure time, and unless they were of very high optical quality they could degrade the quality of the image. Right-reading text or right-handed buttons on men's clothing in a daguerreotype may be the only evidence that the specimen is a copy of a typical wrong-reading original.

The experience of viewing a daguerreotype is unlike that of viewing any other type of photograph. The image does not sit on the surface of the plate. After flipping from positive to negative as the viewing angle is adjusted, viewers experience an apparition in space, a mirage that arises once the eyes are properly focused. When reproduced via other processes, this effect associated with viewing an original daguerreotype will no longer be apparent. Other processes that have a similar viewing experience are holograms on credit cards or Lippmann plates.

A well-exposed and sharp large-format daguerreotype may be able to accurately record fine detail at a resolution that 2000's digital cameras were not able to match.

The image in a daguerreotype is often described as being formed by the amalgam, or alloy, of mercury and silver because mercury vapor from a pool of heated mercury is used to develop the plate; but using the Becquerel process (using a red filter and extra exposure) daguerreotypes can be produced without mercury, and chemical analysis shows that there is no mercury in the final image with the Becquerel process. This brings into question the theory that the image is formed of amalgam with mercury development.

The daguerreotypes of the 1852 Omaha Indian (Native American) delegation in the Smithsonian include a daguerreotype copied in the camera, recognizable by the contrast being high and a black line down the side of the plate.

== Reduction of exposure time ==
In the early 1840s, two innovations were introduced that dramatically shortened the required exposure times: a lens that produced a much brighter image in the camera, and a modification of the chemistry used to sensitize the plate.

The first daguerreotype cameras could not be used for portraiture, as the exposure time required would have been too long. The cameras were fitted with Chevalier lenses which were "slow" (about f/14). (Note: Parisian optician Charles Chevalier had long been making assorted high-quality lenses for microscopes, telescopes and other optical devices. The "Chevalier lens" referred to in the context of these earliest photographic cameras was an 81 mm diameter meniscus achromatic doublet, mounted with its concave surface forward, and had a focal length of about 380 mm (each was ground and polished by hand, so the exact focal length of each was slightly different). A diaphragm with a fixed 27 mm diameter opening formed the front end of the lens barrel and was spaced away from the lens at a distance that optimally reduced the most important lens aberrations. Chevalier soon began producing other, faster camera lens designs which are also commonly called "Chevalier lenses", a potential source of confusion.) They projected a sharp and undistorted but dim image onto the plate. Such a lens was necessary in order to produce the highly detailed results which had elicited so much astonishment and praise when daguerreotypes were first exhibited, results which the purchasers of daguerreotype equipment expected to achieve. Using this lens and the original sensitizing method, an exposure of several minutes was required to photograph even a very brightly sunlit scene. A much "faster" lens could have been provided—simply omitting the integral fixed diaphragm from the Chevalier lens would have increased its working aperture to about f/4.7 and reduced the exposure time by nearly 90 percent — but because of the existing state of lens design the much shorter exposure would have been at the cost of a peripherally distorted and very much less clear image. With uncommon exceptions, daguerreotypes made before 1841 were of static subjects such as landscapes, buildings, monuments, statuary, and still life arrangements. Attempts at portrait photography with the Chevalier lens required the sitter to face into the sun for several minutes while trying to remain motionless and look pleasant, usually producing repulsive and unflattering results. The Woolcott mirror lens that produced tiny, postage stamp size daguerreotypes made portraiture with the daguerreotype process possible and these were the first photographic portraits to be produced. In 1841, the Petzval Portrait Lens was introduced. Professor Andreas von Ettingshausen brought the need for a faster lens for daguerreotype cameras to his colleague, Professor Petzval's attention, who went ahead in cooperation with the Voigtländer firm to design a lens that would reduce the time needed to expose daguerreotype plates for portraiture. Petzval was not aware of the scale of his invention at the start of his work on the lens, and later regretted not having secured his rights by obtaining letters patent on his invention. It was the first lens to be designed using mathematical computation, and a team of mathematicians whose specialty was in fact calculating the trajectories of ballistics was put at Petzval's disposal by the Archduke Ludwig. It was scientifically designed and optimized for its purpose. With a working aperture of about f/3.6, an exposure only about one-fifteenth as long as that required when using a Chevalier lens was sufficient. Although it produced an acceptably sharp image in the central area of the plate, where the sitter's face was likely to be, the image quality dropped off toward the edges, so for this and other reasons it was unsuitable for landscape photography and not a general replacement for Chevalier-type lenses. Petzval intended his lens to be convertible with two alternative rear components: one for portraiture and the other for landscape and architecture.

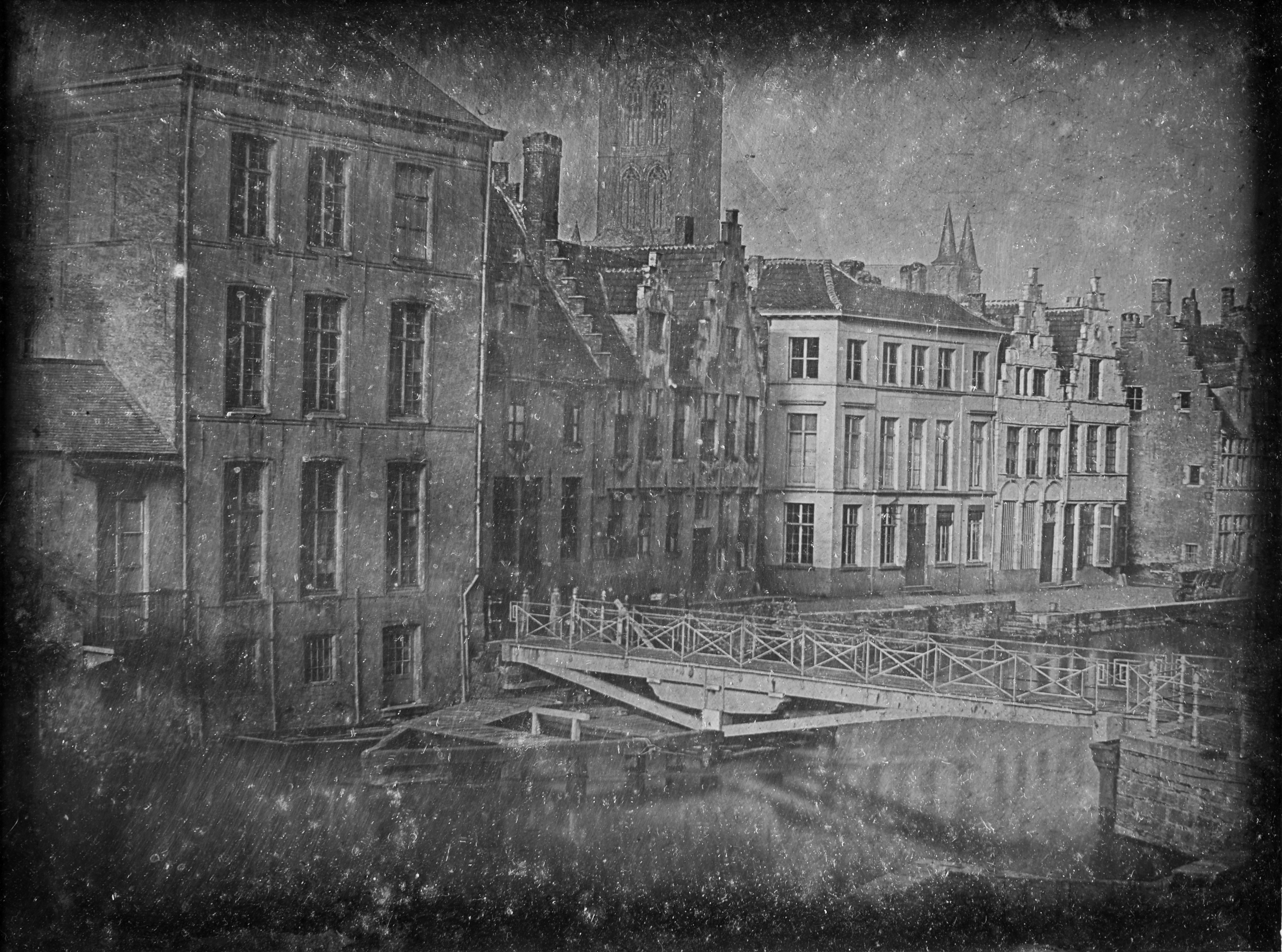
‘View of the Predikherenlei and Predikherenbrug’ depicts the first photographic record of Ghent and in all probability Belgium. It dates back to October 1839, when optician François Braga arrived in Ghent with the daguerreotype camera. Together with his friend, seller of prints and engravings Joseph Pelizzaro, he took the picture on the second floor of judge Philippe Van de Velde's residence on the Ajuinlei. Of the four original plates they made, two plates are in the holdings of STAM – Ghent City Museum, while the two others are lost.

The other major innovation was a chemical one. In Daguerre's original process, the plate was sensitized by exposure to iodine fumes alone. A breakthrough came with the discovery that when exposure to bromine or chlorine fumes was correctly combined with this, the sensitivity of the plate could be greatly increased, which in turn greatly reduced the required exposure time to between fifteen and thirty seconds in favorable lighting conditions, according to Eder. Several experimenters discovered the propensity of using chlorine and bromine in addition to iodine: Wolcott, whose "Wolcott's mixture" was marketed by his partner, John Johnson that they called "quickstuff"; two unrelated individuals with the surname Goddard – Philadelphia physician and chemist Paul Beck Goddard, and John Frederick Goddard who lectured at the Adelaide Gallery before assisting Beard with setting up the first daguerreotype portraiture studio on the roof of the Regent Street Polytechnic; (John Frederick Goddard was the first to publish information that bromine increased the sensitivity of daguerreotype plates in the Literary Gazette of 12 December 1840) and in Vienna: Krachowila and the Natterer brothers.

== Unusual daguerreotype cameras ==
A number of innovative camera designs appeared:

By December 1839, Carl August von Steinheil invented a small, portable metal camera, which was one-twentieth the size of the camera sold by Giroux. The resulting daguerreotypes were viewed in a special brass viewer. At least ten of these cameras were created.

One early attempt to address the lack of a good "fast" lens for portraiture, and the subject of the first US patent for photographic apparatus, was Alexander S. Wolcott's camera, which used a concave mirror instead of a lens and operated on the principle of the reflecting telescope. The mirror was fitted at one end of the camera and focusing was done by adjusting the position of the plate in a holder that slid along a rail. Designed solely for portraiture, this arrangement produced a far brighter image than a Chevalier lens, or even the later Petzval lens, but image quality was only marginal and the design was only practical for use with small plates.

Friedrich Voigtländer's small, all-metal Daguerreotype camera (1841) was small enough to be carried. It was fitted with a f/3.5 Petzval portrait lens at the front and a focusing lens at the back, and took round plates. Only 600 of these cameras were produced.

The directions for the use of the Voigtländer camera read as follows:

Directions for the use of the new daguerreotype apparatus for the making of portraits, executed according to the calculations of Professor Petzval by Voigtländer and Son, Vienna, printed by J.P.Sollinger, August 1, 1841.

The person to be photographed must be seated in the open air. For an exposure by overcast, dark skies in winter 3 ½ minutes is sufficient; on a sunny day in the shade 1½ to 2 minutes are enough, and in direct sunlight it requires no more than 40–45 seconds. The last, however, is seldom employed on account of the deep shadows direct sunlight creates.

The stated exposure times are evidently for plates sensitized with iodine only; improved sensitization methods were just being introduced in 1841–42.

In 1845 Friedrich von Martens invented the first panoramic camera for curved daguerreotype plates with a lens that turned to cover an angle of 150 degrees. It was called "Megaskop-Kamera" of "Panorama-Kamera".

Netto constructed, in 1841, a studio in which the front part of the camera with the lens was built into the wall between the studio and the adjoining darkroom, the rear part of the camera being inside the darkroom.

== Portraiture ==
In one early attempt at portraiture, a Swedish amateur daguerreotypist caused his sitter nearly to lose an eye because of practically staring into the sun during the five-minute exposure.

Even with fast lenses and much more sensitive plates, under portrait studio lighting conditions an exposure of several seconds was necessary on the brightest of days, and on hazy or cloudy days the sitter had to remain still for considerably longer. The head rest was already in use for portrait painting.

Establishments producing daguerreotype portraits generally had a daylight studio built on the roof, much like a greenhouse. Whereas later in the history of photography artificial electric lighting was done in a dark room, building up the light with hard spotlights and softer floodlights, the daylight studio was equipped with screens and blinds to control the light, to reduce it and make it unidirectional, or diffuse it to soften harsh direct lighting. Blue filtration was sometimes used to make it easier for the sitter to tolerate the strong light, as a daguerreotype plate was almost exclusively sensitive to light at the blue end of the spectrum and filtering out everything else did not significantly increase the exposure time.

Usually, it was arranged so that sitters leaned their elbows on a support such as a posing table, the height of which could be adjusted, or else head rests were used that did not show in the picture, and this led to most daguerreotype portraits having stiff, lifeless poses. Some exceptions exist, with lively expressions full of character, as photographers saw the potential of the new medium, and would have used the tableau vivant technique. These are represented in museum collections and are the most sought after by private collectors today. In the case of young children, their mothers were sometimes hidden in the frame, to calm them and keep them still so as to prevent blurring.

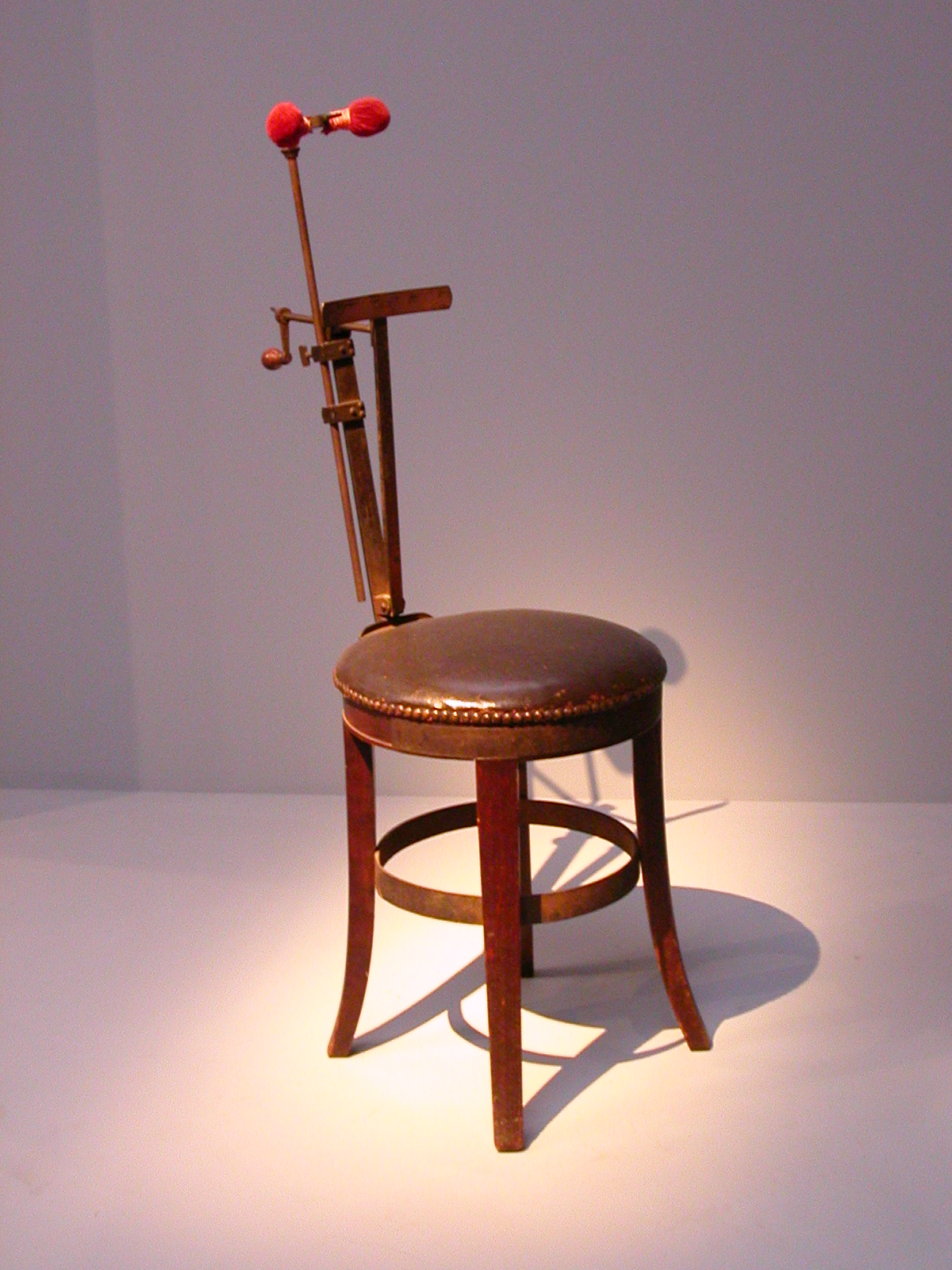
Device to hold heads still during the long exposure time required to make a daguerreotype portrait

== Proliferation ==
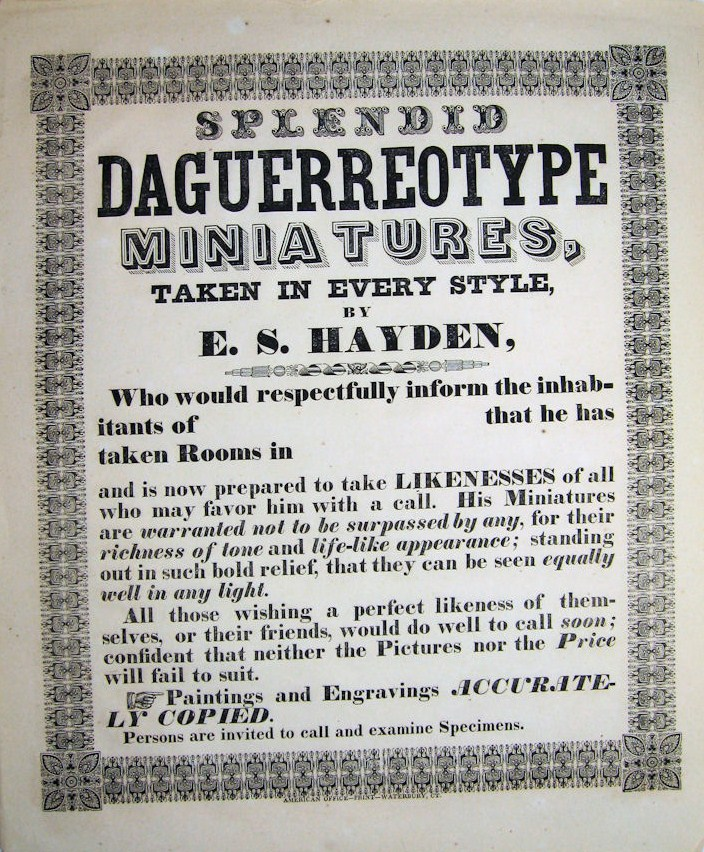
Advertisement for a traveling daguerreotype photographer, with location left blank

André-Adolphe-Eugène Disdéri and Jules Itier of France, and Johann Baptist Isenring of Switzerland, became prominent daguerreotypists. In Britain, however, Richard Beard bought the British daguerreotype patent from Miles Berry in 1841 and closely controlled his investment, selling licenses throughout the country and prosecuting infringers. Among others, Antoine Claudet and Thomas Richard Williams produced daguerreotypes in the UK.

External videos
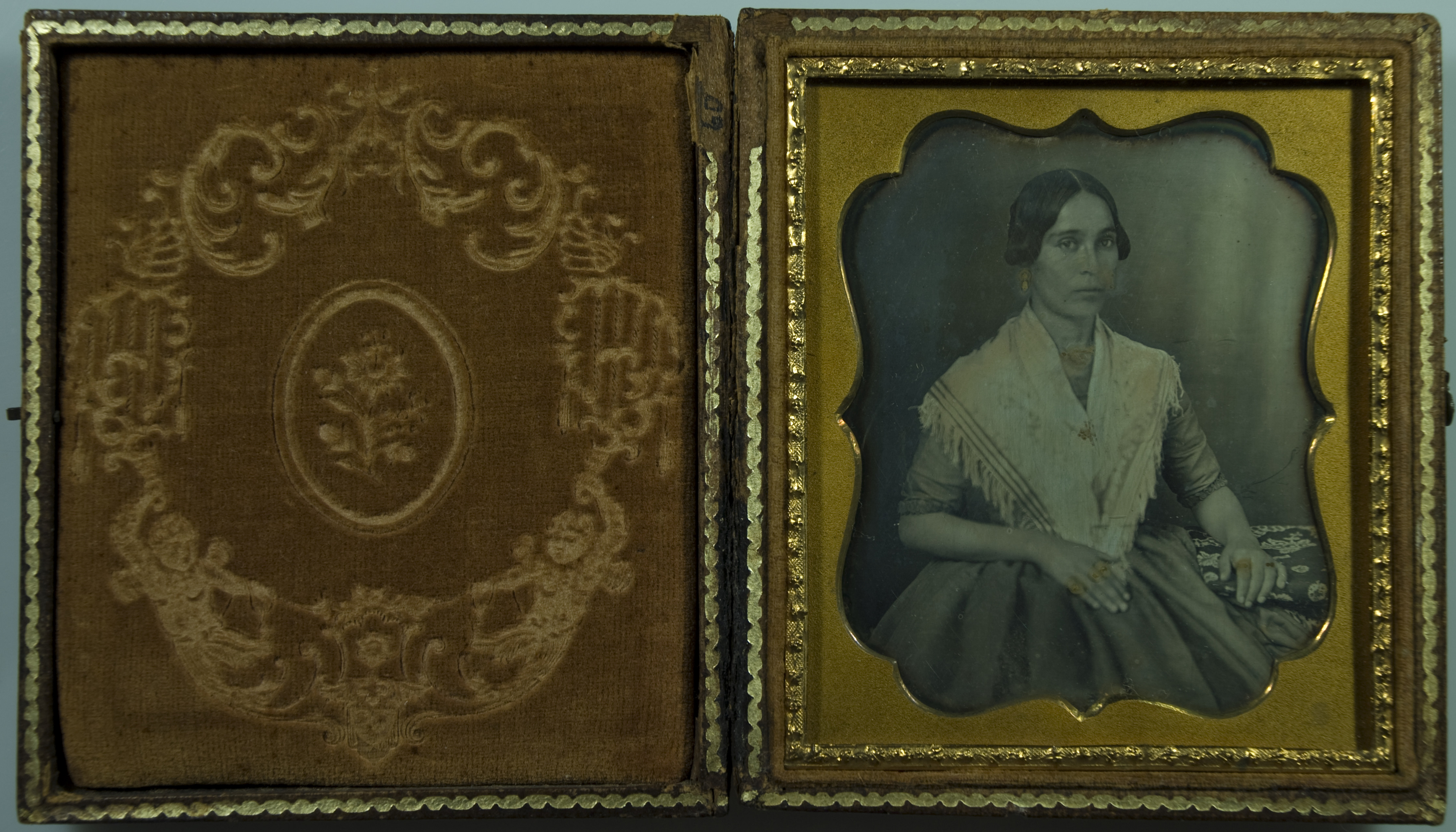
- Early photography: making daguerreotypes, J. Paul Getty Museum with Khan Academy

Daguerreotype photography spread rapidly across the United States after the discovery first appeared in US newspapers in February 1839. In the early 1840s, the invention was introduced in a period of months to practitioners in the United States by Samuel Morse, inventor of the telegraph code.

It is possible that Morse may have been the first American to view a daguerreotype first-hand. Morse's experience with art and technology in the early 1800s attracted him to the daguerreotype; in the summers of 1820 and 1821 he conducted proto-photographic experiments with Benjamin Silliman. In his piece The Gallery of the Louvre Morse used a camera obscura to precisely capture the gallery which he then used to create the final painting.

Morse met the inventor of the daguerreotype, Louis-Jacques-Mande Daguerre, in Paris in January 1839 when Daguerre's invention was announced. While the daguerreotype fascinated Morse, he was concerned about how the new invention would compete with his telegraph. However, Morse's viewing of the daguerreotype alleviated his fears when he saw how revolutionary its technology was. Morse wrote a letter to his brother Sidney describing Daguerre's invention, which Sidney then published in the New-York Observer on April 20, 1839. While this was not the first report of the daguerreotype to appear in America, it was the first in-person report to appear in the United States.

Morse's account of the brand-new invention interested the American public, and through further publishings the technique of the daguerreotype was integrated into the United States. Magazines and newspapers included essays applauding the daguerreotype for advancing democratic American values because it could create an image without painting, which was less efficient and more expensive. The introduction of the daguerreotype to America also promoted progress of ideals and technology. For example, an article published in the Boston Daily Advertiser on February 23, 1839, described the daguerreotype as having similar properties of the camera obscura, but introduced its remarkable capability of "fixing the image permanently on the paper, or making a permanent drawing, by the agency of light alone," which combined old and new concepts for readers to understand.

By 1853, an estimated three million daguerreotypes per year were being produced in the United States alone. One of these original Morse Daguerreotype cameras is currently on display at the National Museum of American History, a branch of the Smithsonian Institution, in Washington, D.C. A flourishing market in portraiture sprang up, predominantly the work of itinerant practitioners who traveled from town to town. For the first time in history, people could obtain an exact likeness of themselves or their loved ones for a modest cost, making portrait photographs extremely popular with those of modest means. Celebrities and everyday people sought portraits and workers would save an entire day's income to have a daguerreotype taken of them, including occupational portraits.

Notable U.S. daguerreotypists of the mid-19th century included James Presley Ball, Samuel Bemis, Abraham Bogardus, Mathew Brady, Thomas Martin Easterly, François Fleischbein, Jeremiah Gurney, John Plumbe, Jr., Albert Southworth, Augustus Washington, Ezra Greenleaf Weld, John Adams Whipple, and Frederick Douglass.

This method spread to other parts of the world as well:

- The first daguerreotype in Australia was taken in 1841, but no longer survives. The oldest surviving Australian daguerreotype is a portrait of Dr. William Bland taken in 1845.
- In Jamaica Adolphe Duperly, a Frenchman, produced a booklet of Daguerreotypes, Daguerian Excursions in Jamaica, being a collection of views ... taken on the spot with the Daguerreotype which probably appeared in 1844.
- In 1857, Ichiki Shirō created the first known Japanese photograph, a portrait of his daimyō Shimazu Nariakira. The photograph was designated an Important Cultural Property by the government of Japan.
- In the early 1850s, Augustus Washington left Hartford Connecticut to eventually take daguerreotypes for the political leaders of Monrovia, Liberia. He then went on to be elected as a speaker of the Liberian House of Representatives and later a member of the Liberian Senate.

== Astronomical applications in the 19th century ==
In 1839, François Arago had in his address to the French Chamber of Deputies outlined a wealth of possible applications including astronomy, and indeed the daguerreotype was still occasionally used for astronomical photography in the 1870s.

The first known photograph of a solar eclipse was taken on July 28, 1851, by Johann Julius Friedrich Berkowski, using the daguerreotype process.

Although the collodion wet plate process offered a cheaper and more convenient alternative for commercial portraiture and for other applications with shorter exposure times, when the transit of Venus was about to occur and observations were to be made from several sites on the Earth's surface in order to calculate astronomical distances, daguerreotypy proved a more accurate method of making visual recordings through telescopes because it was a dry process with greater dimensional stability, whereas collodion glass plates were exposed wet and the image would become slightly distorted when the emulsion dried.

== Late and modern use ==
Although the daguerreotype process is sometimes said to have died out completely in the early 1860s, documentary evidence indicates that some very slight use of it persisted more or less continuously throughout the following 150 years of its supposed extinction. A few first-generation daguerreotypists refused to entirely abandon their old medium when they started making the new, cheaper, easier to view but comparatively drab ambrotypes and tintypes. Historically minded photographers of subsequent generations, often fascinated by daguerreotypes, sometimes experimented with making their own or even revived the process commercially as a "retro" portraiture option for their clients. These eccentric late uses were extremely unusual and surviving examples reliably dated to between the 1860s and the 1960s are now exceedingly rare.

The daguerreotype experienced a minor renaissance in the late 20th century and the process is currently practiced by a handful of enthusiastic devotees; there are thought to be fewer than 100 worldwide (see list of artists on cdags.org in links below). In recent years, artists like Jerry Spagnoli, Adam Fuss, Patrick Bailly-Maître-Grand, Alyssa C. Salomon, and Chuck Close have reintroduced the medium to the broader art world. The use of electronic flash in modern daguerreotype has solved many of the problems connected with the slow speed of the process when using daylight.

International group exhibitions of contemporary daguerreotypists' works have been held, notably the 2009 exhibition in Bry Sur Marne, France, with 182 daguerreotypes by forty-four artists, and the 2013 ImageObject exhibition in New York City, showcasing seventy-five works by thirty-three artists. The Astolat Dollhouse Castle also displays daguerreotypes. The appeal of the medium lies in the "magic mirror" effect of light striking the polished silver plate and revealing a silvery image which can seem ghostly and ethereal even while being perfectly sharp, and in the dedication and handcrafting required to make a daguerreotype.

== Gallery of sample daguerreotypes ==
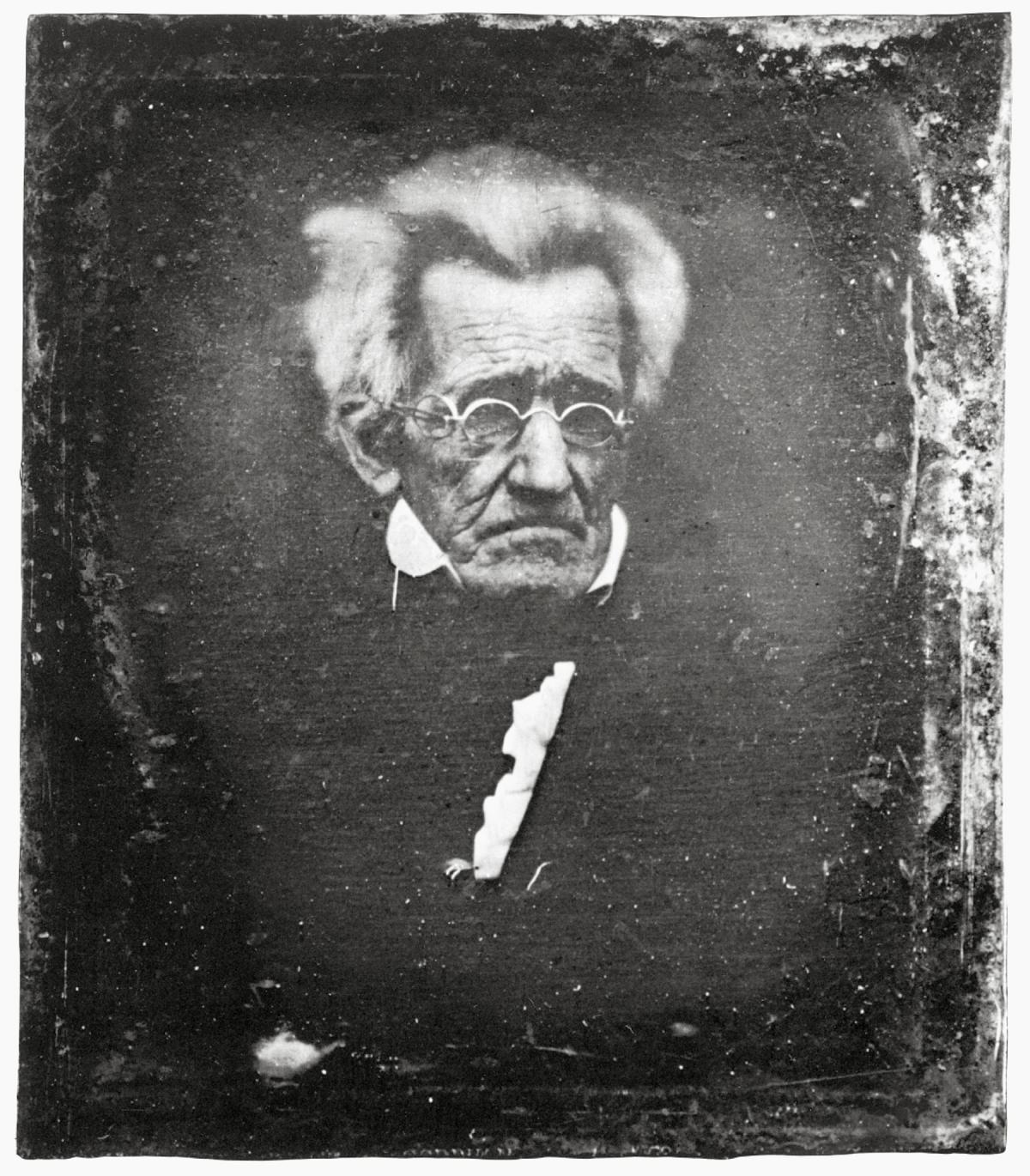
Andrew Jackson at age 78

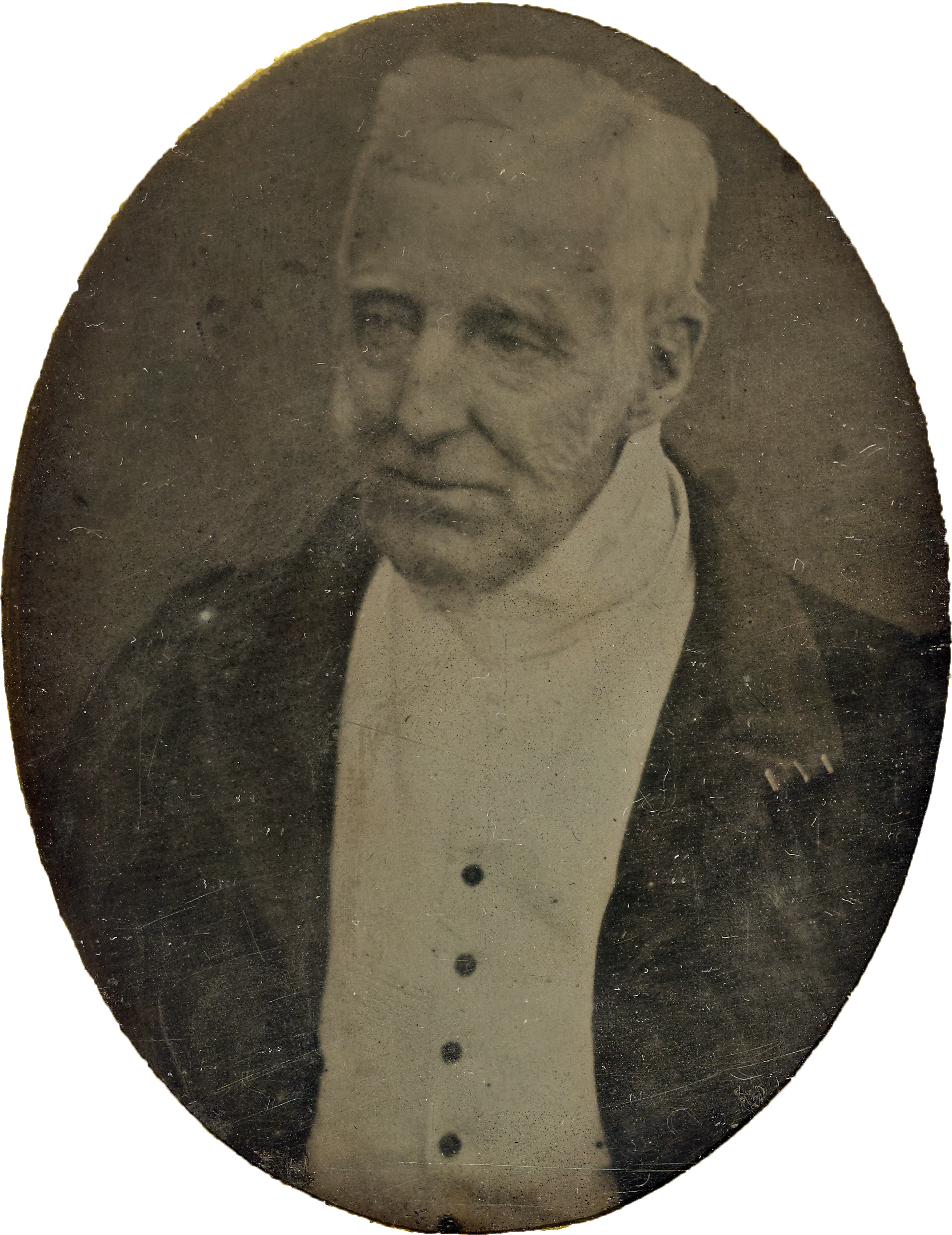
Arthur Wellesley, the Duke of Wellington, aged 74 or 75, made by Antoine Claudet in 1844

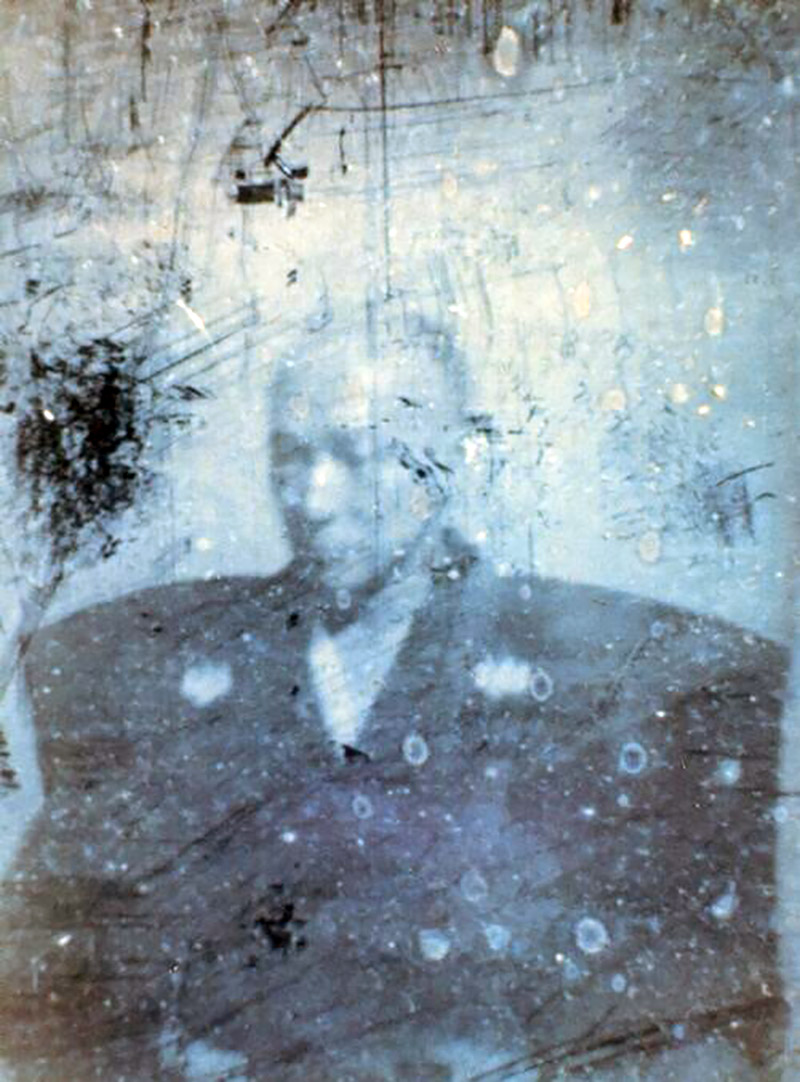
Shimazu Nariakira, made by Ichiki Shirō in 1857, the earliest surviving Japanese photograph

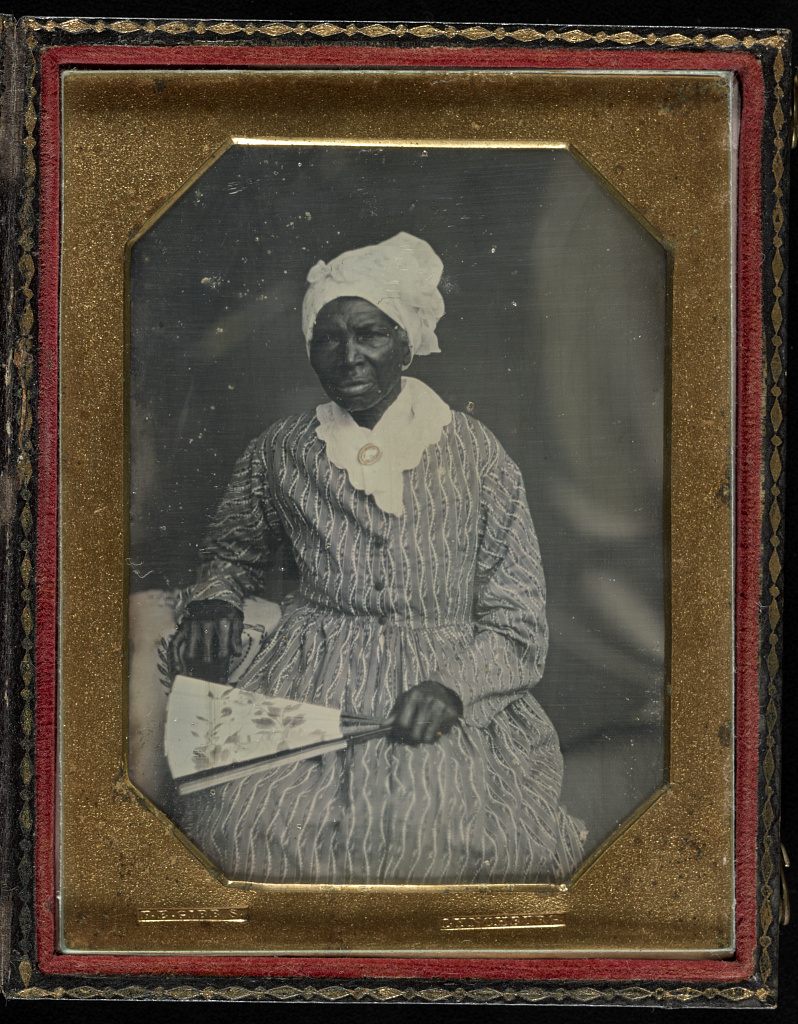
Mary Brice, a woman enslaved at the Point of Honor plantation c. 1853.

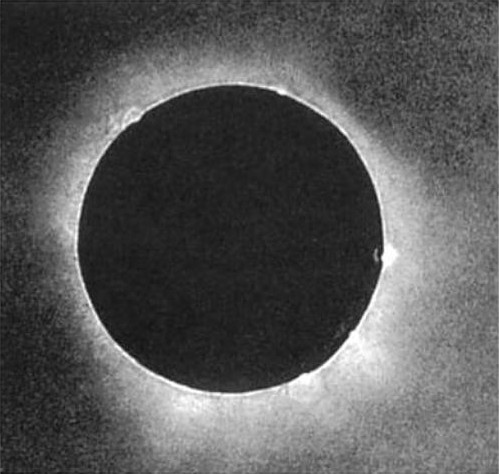
The solar eclipse of July 28, 1851, the first correctly exposed photograph of a solar eclipse using the daguerreotype process

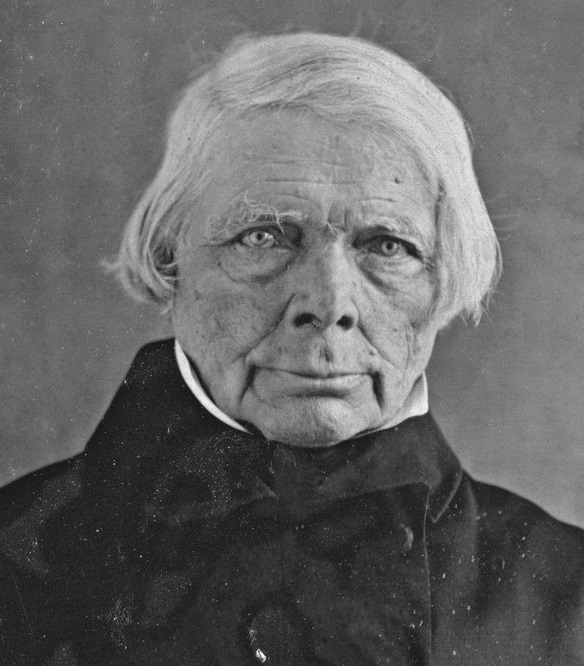
Philosopher Friedrich Wilhelm Joseph Schelling, made by Hermann Biow in February 1848

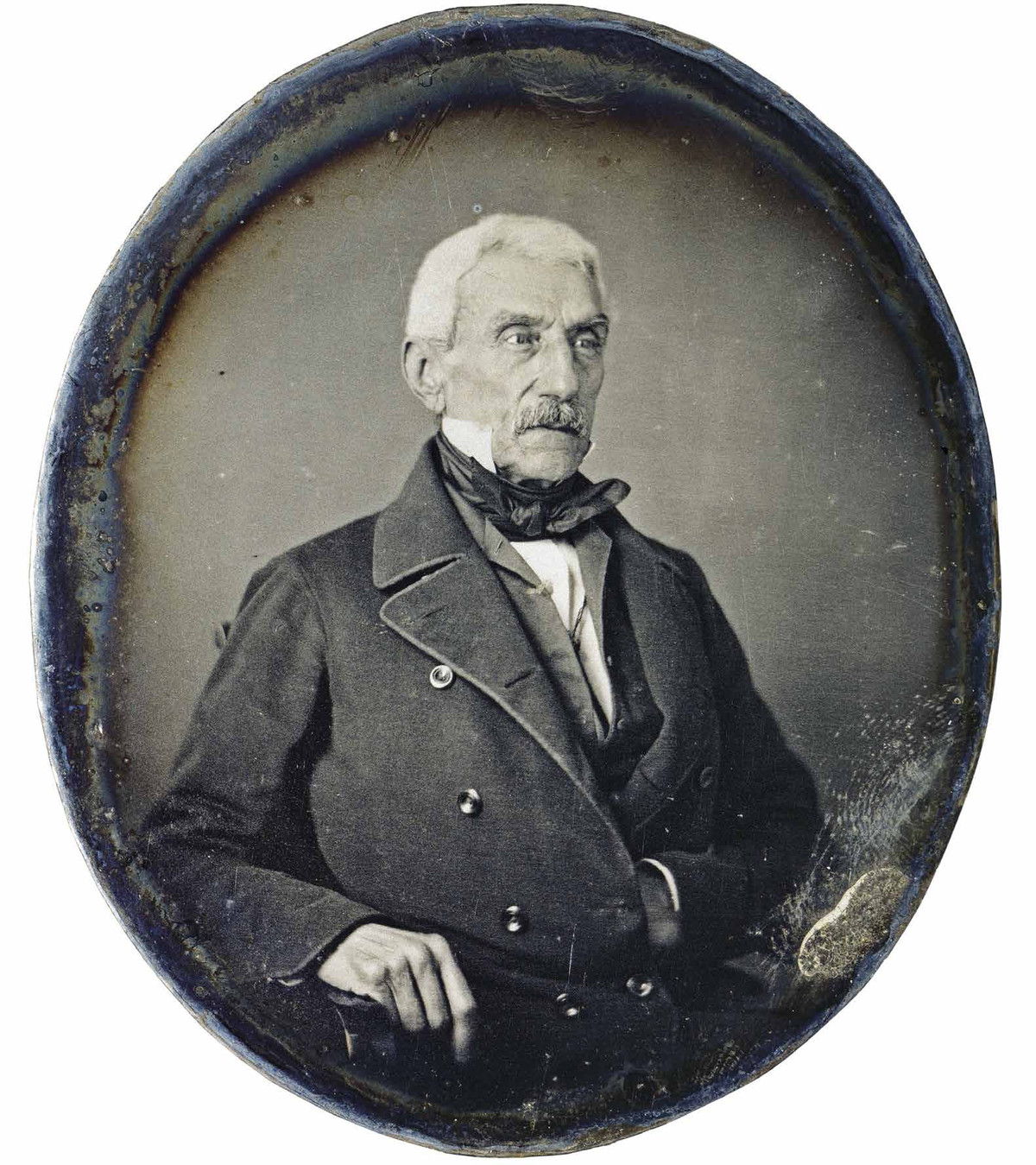
José de San Martín, made in Paris 1848

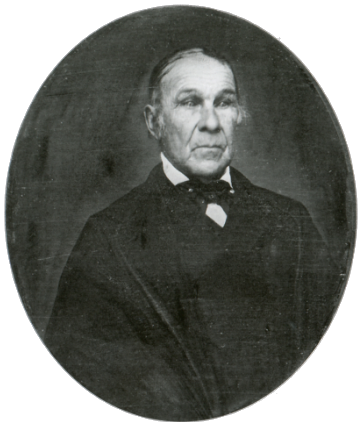
John Adams, a shoemaker at age 100, born in 1745, possibly the earliest-born person photographed

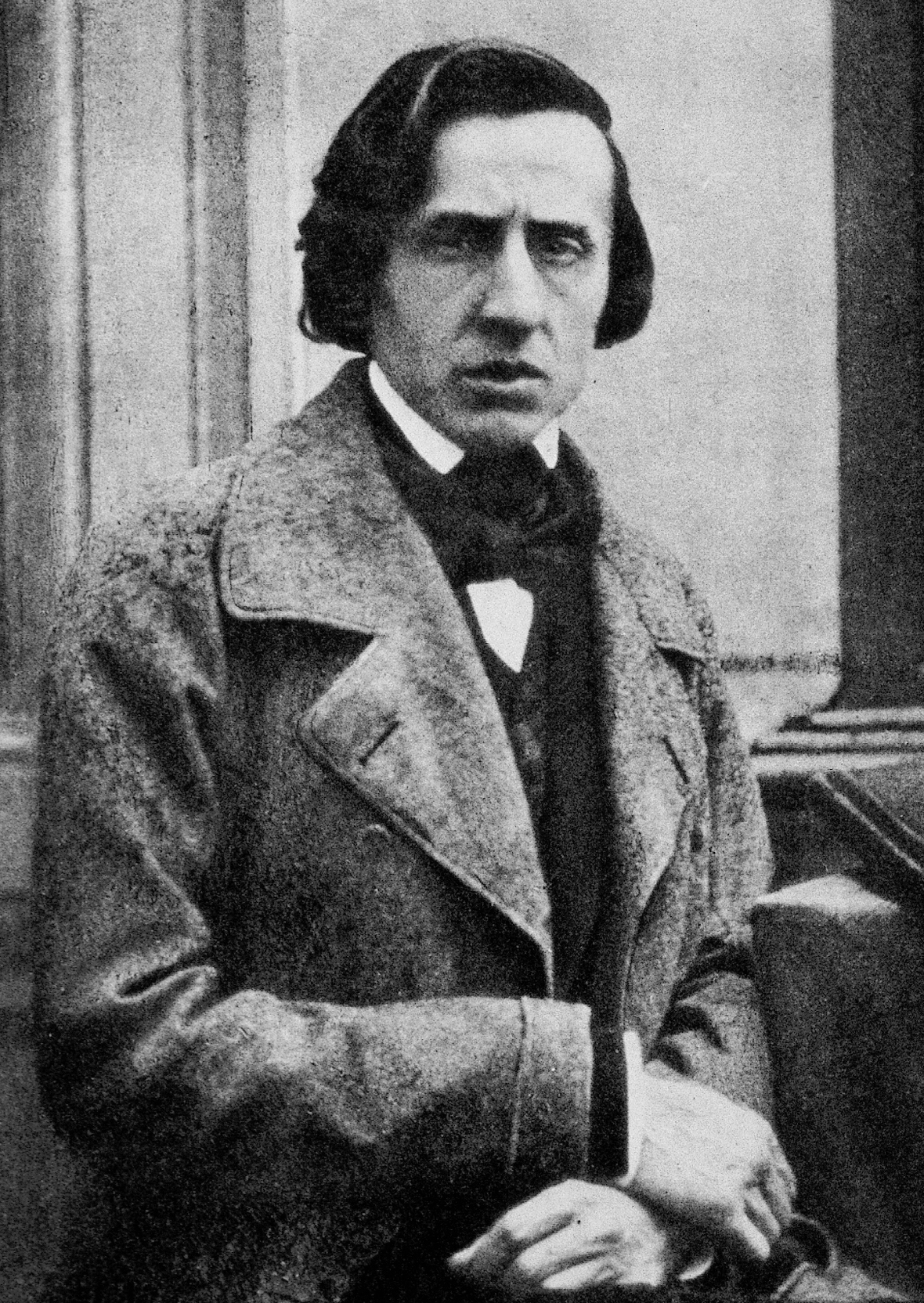
Frédéric Chopin, c. 1849

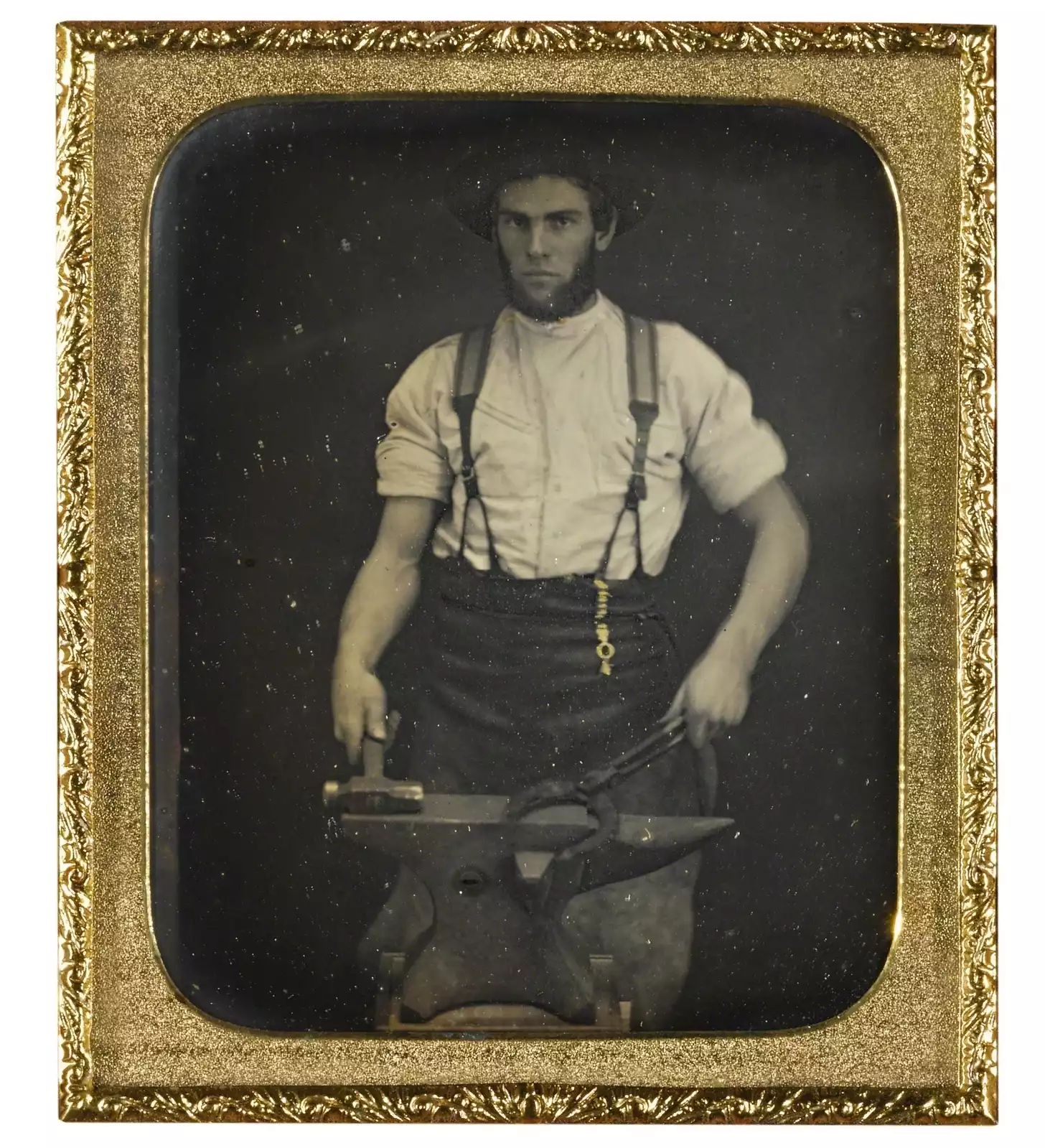
Blacksmith Forging a Horseshoe, c. 1859–1860 by Summer A. Smith

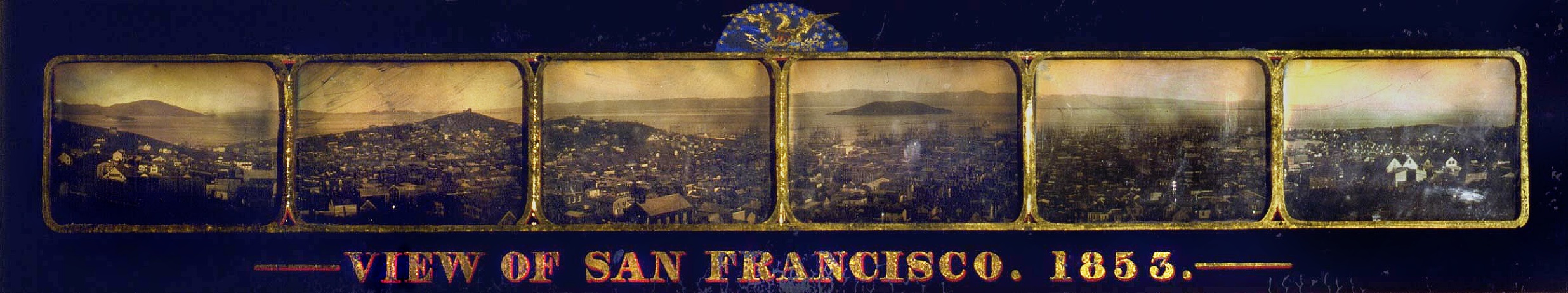
Six daguerreotypes show a panorama of San Francisco, California, in 1853

== See also ==
- History of photography
- Albumen print
- Ambrotype
- Calotype
- Daguerreobase
- Hugh Lee Pattinson
- Joseph-Philibert Girault de Prangey
- Daniel Davis Jr.
- Lippmann plate
- Noël Paymal Lerebours
- Physautotype
- Tintype
