= Daguerreobase =

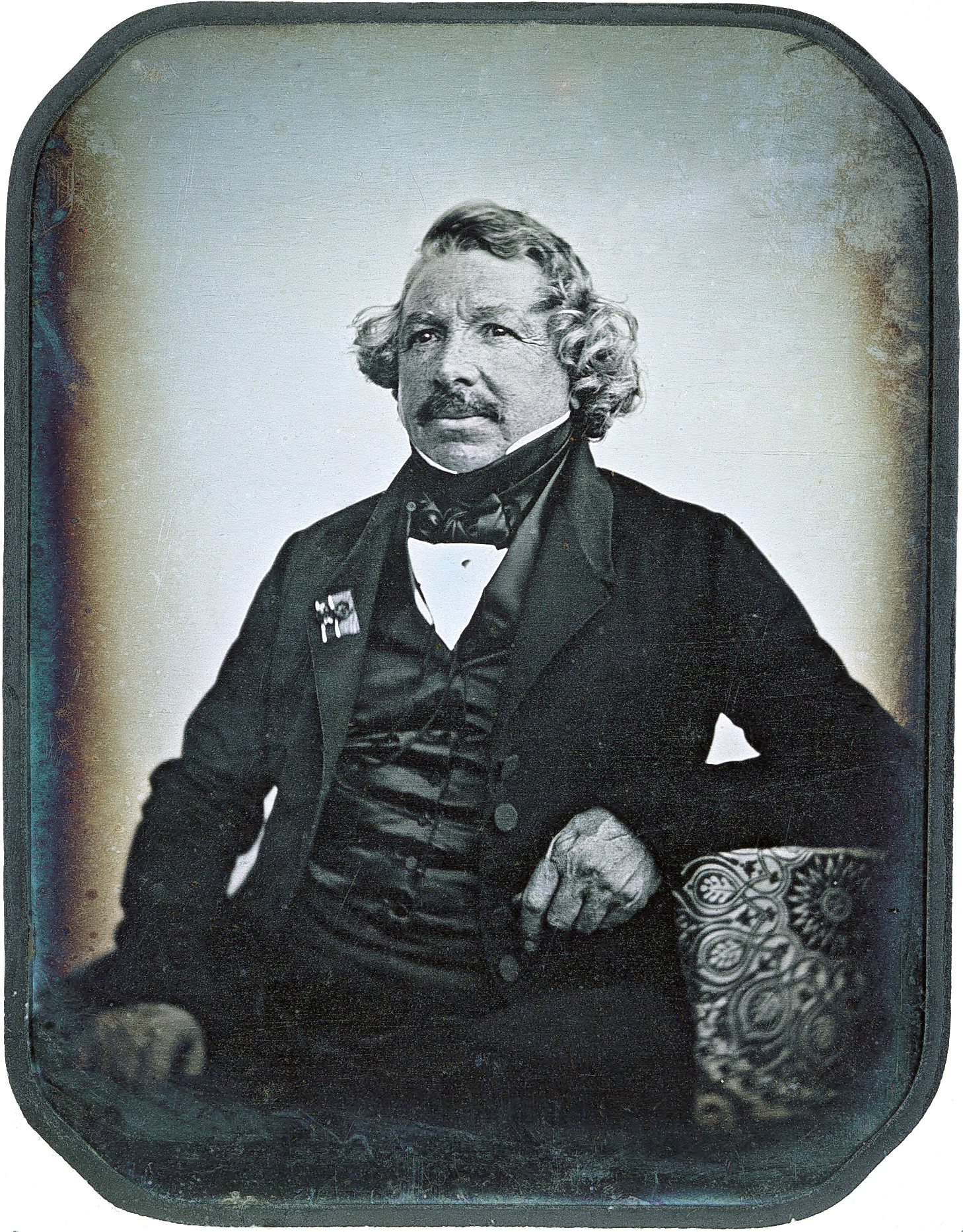
Daguerreotype of Louis Daguerre in 1844 by Jean-Baptiste Sabatier-Blot

Daguerreobase is a public platform of archives, libraries, museums and private contributors from across Europe. Daguerreobase assembles and preserves information on daguerreotypes. It aims to bring together digital images and descriptions of more than 25,000 European historical daguerreotypes, daguerreotype equipment, and related literature.

Daguerreobase is primarily a database hosting images of daguerreotypes for curators, photographic historians, collectors, photographers, and the general public.

The content is also available through Europeana, the portal and digital library for European Cultural Heritage of the European Union.

In 2014, Daguerreobase and Europeana celebrated the 175th birthday of photography with a virtual exhibition of European daguerreotypes on their website.

Currently 17 partners from 13 different European countries are working together, including institutions, private collectors and photograph conservators.

The project is partially funded under the Information and communications technology Policy Support Programme (ICT PSP) as part of the Competitiveness and Innovation Framework Programme by the European Community.

== Coordinator ==
Belgium – FotoMuseum Provincie Antwerp, FoMu

== Partners ==
Austria – Institut für Papierrestaurierung Schloß Schönbrunn, IPR

Belgium – eDAVID

Czech Republic – National Technical Museum

Denmark – The Royal Library, The National Library and Copenhagen University Library

Finland – The Finnish Museum of Photography, FMP

France – Atelier de Restauration et de Conservation des Photographies de la Ville de Paris, ARCP

Germany – Museum Ludwig / Stadt Köln

Germany – Technische Sammlungen Dresden, Dresden

Italy – SMP Di Sandra Maria Petrillo

Luxembourg – Ministère de la Culture

Norway – National Library of Norway

Norway – University of Bergen

Spain – Universitat Politècnica de Valencia

Netherlands – Stichting Nederlands Fotomuseum

Netherlands – Picturae bv

Netherlands – Ortelee Marinus Jan / Daguerreotypist, MOCED

United Kingdom – Museum Conservation Services Ltd

== See also ==
- Daguerreotypes
- Europeana
