= François Fleischbein =

German-American painter

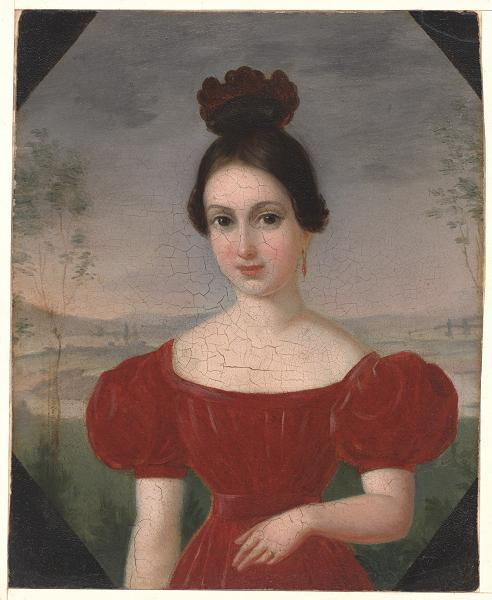
Portrait of Marie Louis Tetu, 1833–1836, Dallas Museum of Art

François Jacques Fleischbein (1804–1868) was a German painter who lived and worked in New Orleans.

== Biography ==
Fleischbein was born in Godramstein, Palatinate, nowadays Germany, in 1804. He studied painting in Paris with Anne-Louis Girodet. In 1833, he and his wife, Marie Louis Tetu, immigrated to cosmopolitan New Orleans, thus joining the community of international painters seeking fame in Louisiana. Although born Franz Joseph, Fleischbein decided to change his name to François in order to fit with his Creole clients of Gallic descent.

His paintings show a French academic style as well as a sweetness and charm common to 19th-century German painting.

With the invention of the daguerreotype in 1839, Fleischbein also worked as an early photographer, an enterprise in which his wife took part.

== Bibliography ==
- Old Sketchbook recalls early New Orleans artist, Times-Picayuna, George E. Jordan, 1976
- Old Louisiana Plantation Homes and Family Trees, Herman de Bachelle Seebold, vol. 1, p 23
