= Richard Beard (photographer) =

British photographer and businessman (1801-1885)

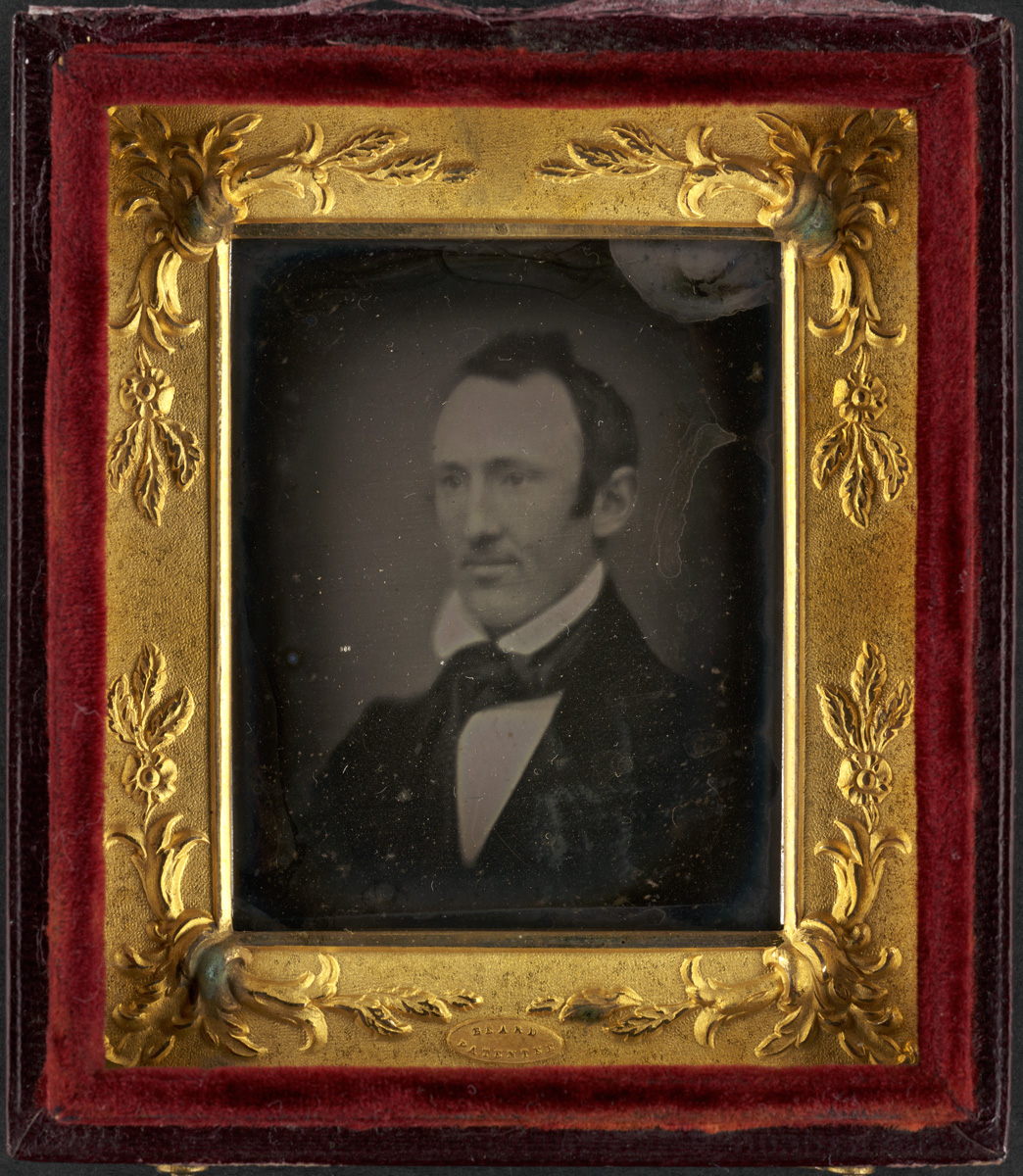
1841 Daguerreotype of Wendell Phillips by Richard Beard

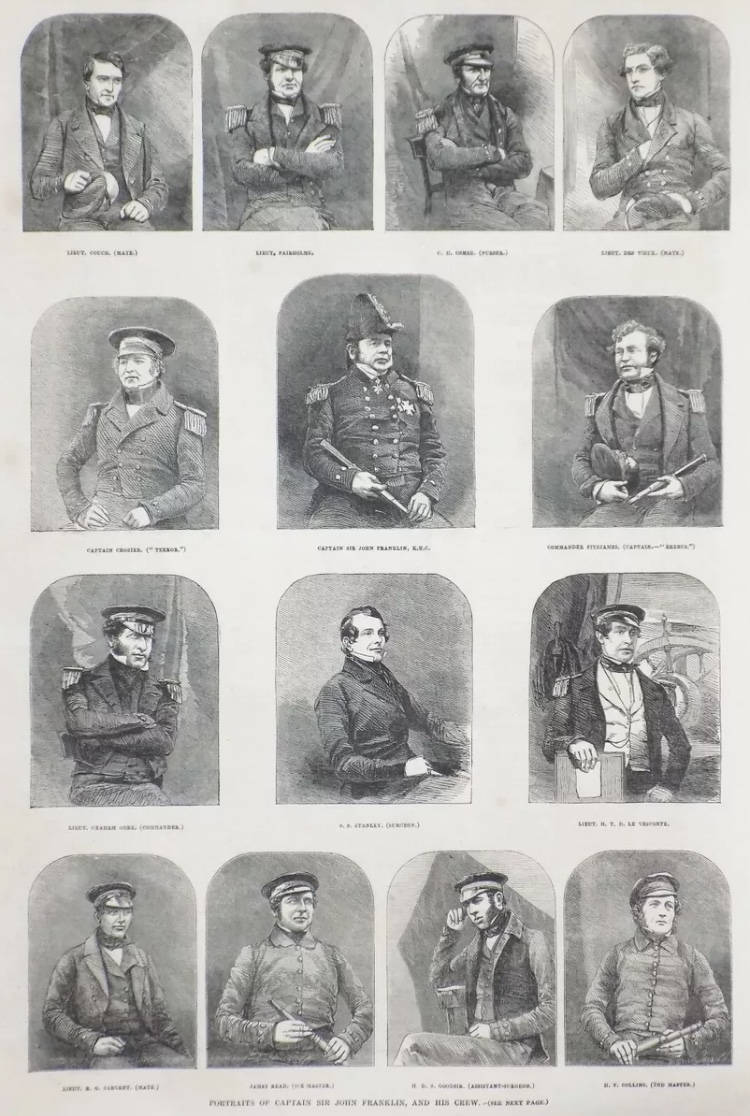
Erebus officers:Top row left to right:Lt. Edward Couch (mate); James Walter Fairholme; Charles Hamilton Osmer (Purser); Charles Frederick Des Voeux [2nd Mate]. 2nd row from top Left to right: Francis Crozier (HMS Terror); Sir John Franklin; James FitzJames. 3rd row from top left to right: Graham Gore (Commander); Stephen Samuel Stanley (Surgeon); 2nd Lt. Henry Thomas Dundas Le Vesconte. Bottom row left to right: Robert Orme Sergeant [1st mate]; James Reid [MAster]; Harry Duncan Goodsir (Assistant Surgeon); Henry Foster Collins (2nd Master), sketches from daguerreotypes by Richard Beard – The Illustrated London News (1845)

Richard Beard (22 December 1801 – 7 June 1885) was an English entrepreneur and photographer who vigorously protected his photographic business by litigation over his photographic patents and helped to establish professional photography in the UK.

== Early life ==
Beard was born at East Stonehouse, Devon, the second son of Richard Bowden Beard (1773–1840) and his wife, Elizabeth (1775–1818). Beard's father was a grocer and Beard joined the family business, marrying Elizabeth Branscombe (born 1798) on 12 March 1825. After Beard became manager of the business it thrived, acquiring other local concerns. Beard moved to London in the early 1830s and, in 1833, invested in a coal merchants, again expanding it with his entrepreneurial skill and vigour. Beard's business interests were broad. In 1839, he filed a patent for colour printing of fabric.

== Photography ==
In 1839, Beard took an interest in the frenzy of public excitement over the first announcements of practical photographic processes by Louis Daguerre and William Fox Talbot. In early 1840, Beard was contacted by patent agent William Carpmael (1804–1867, who was also Talbot's agent). Carpmael brokered a meeting between Beard and an American, William S. Johnson who was marketing a photographic camera on behalf of his son, John, and Alexander S. Wolcott, an instrument maker.

The camera performed poorly but Beard grasped the business potential of photography so entered into a commercial agreement with Johnson and Wolcott, secured a patent on the camera and used John Frederick Goddard's publication of the fact that fuming the silver plate with bromine as well as iodine improved sensitivity to light, thereby reducing exposure times. By September 1841, it was reported that on a bright day Beard's studio could make portraits in four to seven seconds.

In 1841, with the assistance of William S. Johnson through instructions of his son (camera inventor), Beard opened England's first professional photography studio at The Polytechnic, Regent Street. He purchased a monopoly on the patent of the Daguerreotype process in England and Wales and spent £20,000 in establishing a chain of photographic studios in London and selling licenses for studios in the provinces, Goddard acting as technical adviser. He explored the possibility of licensing Fox Talbot's calotype process but the two could not agree terms.

Though Beard was describing himself in 1851 as a "photographic artist" and exhibited at The Great Exhibition, there is little evidence that he was himself an extensive practitioner. The surviving Daguerreotypes attributed to him are largely the works of others.

== Litigation and disillusion ==
Beard was a robust defender of his commercial interests, engaging in many legal actions, including against Antoine Claudet (which he lost) and most famously Beard v. Egerton. This long and complicated case seems ultimately to have exhausted his appetite for litigation. Though he was declared bankrupt in 1849, this seems likely to have been a mere commercial device and there is no evidence that he was impoverished, his son Richard having gradually acquired the running of the business.

== Later life ==
Beard's interest in photography declined and by 1861 he was describing himself as a "coal merchant". In the 1860s, Beard briefly established himself as a "medical galvanist".

Beard died in Hampstead and was buried at Hampstead Cemetery.

== Bibliography ==
- Gernsheim, H. & Gernsheim, A. (1969). The History of Photography, 1685 – 1914 (2nd rev. ed.). Thames & Hudson. ISBN 0-500-01060-9.
- Heathcote, B. V. & Heathcote, P. F. (1979). "Richard Beard: an ingenious and enterprising patentee". History of Photography. 3 (4): 313–329. doi:10.1080/03087298.1979.10441125.
- Hughes, J. (1864). "The bromine question and Mr J. F. Goddard". Photographic News. 8: 232–233.
- Ward, J. (2006) "Beard, Richard (1801–1885)", Oxford Dictionary of National Biography, online edn, Oxford University Press. Retrieved 6 August 2007 (subscription required)
- Werge, J. (1890). The Evolution of Photography. Ayer Co. ISBN 0-405-04949-8.
- Wood, R. D. (1979). "The daguerreotype in England: some primary material relating to Beard's lawsuits". History of Photography. 3 (4): 305–309. doi:10.1080/03087298.1979.10441123. Archived from the original on 23 September 2007.
- Court of Queen's Bench before Lord Chief Justice Denman. June 25, 1842. BERRY v. CLAUDET
