= Summer A. Smith =

19th century daguerreotype photographer

Summer A. Smith was an American photographer who worked in the 1850s and 1860s and was an early creator of daguerrotypes.

== Career ==
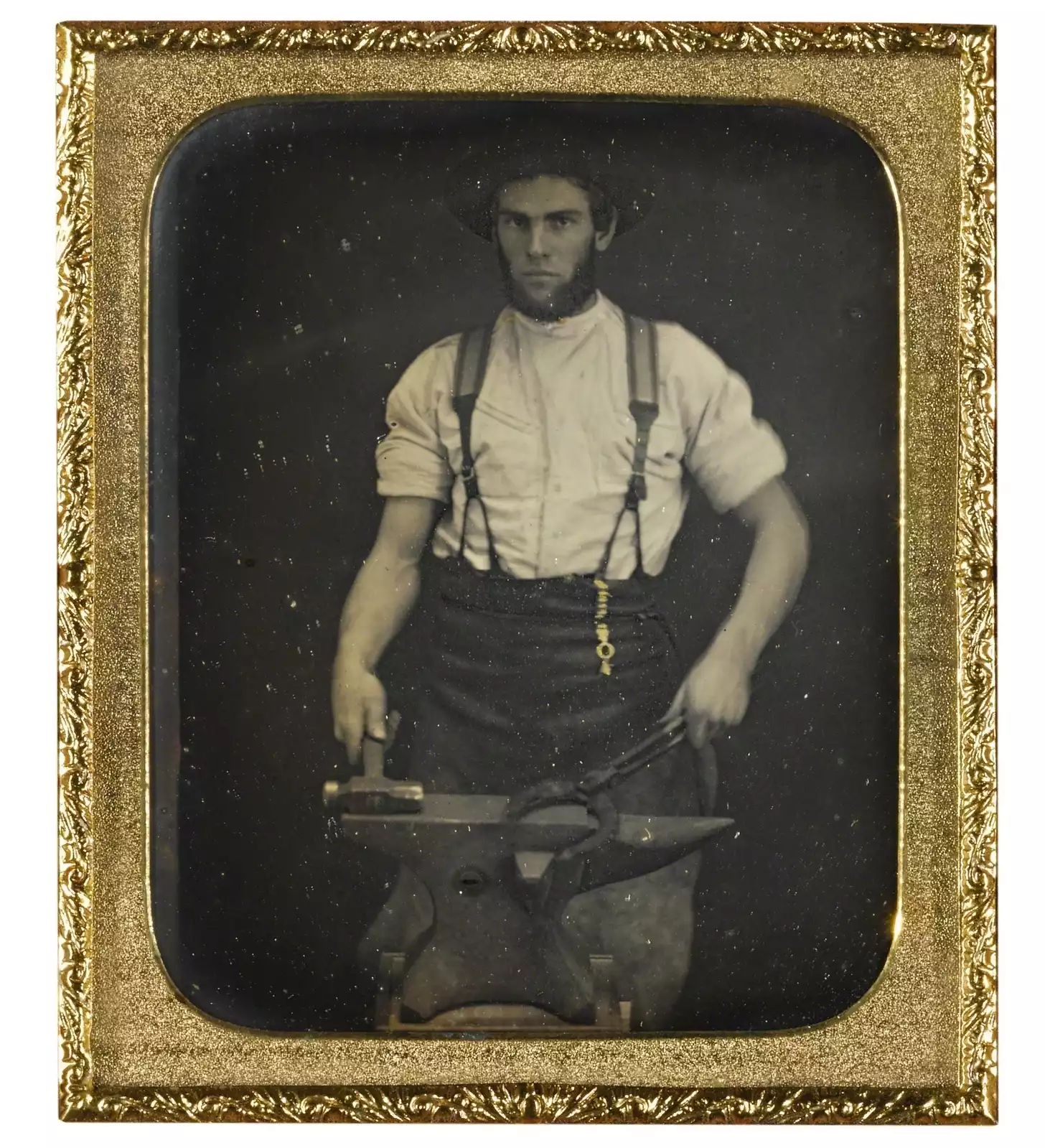
Blacksmith Forging a Horseshoe, c. 1859–1860, by Summer A. Smith

Smith was one of eighteen professional women photographers who worked in Pennsylvania prior to 1870.

Smith was active in the 1850s and 1860s, including a stint in Philadelphia and Montrose, Iowa. While in Philadelphia, Smith boarded at one of the several inns known as the Black Horse Tavern and operated a daguerreotypist studio nearby.

Two of Smith's prints are included in the collection of the Museum of Fine Arts Houston.

== Notable work ==
- Blacksmith Forging a Horseshoe, 1859-1860
