= John Frederick Goddard =

English chemist

John Frederick Goddard (1795–1866) was an English chemist who made important contributions to the early development of photography, in particular in his work for Richard Beard.

== Bibliography ==
- Hughes, J. (1864). "The bromine question and Mr J. F. Goddard". Photographic News. 8: 232–233.
- Leggat, R. (1995). "GODDARD, John Frederick". A History of Photography.
