= Claude Niépce =

French inventor (1764–1828)

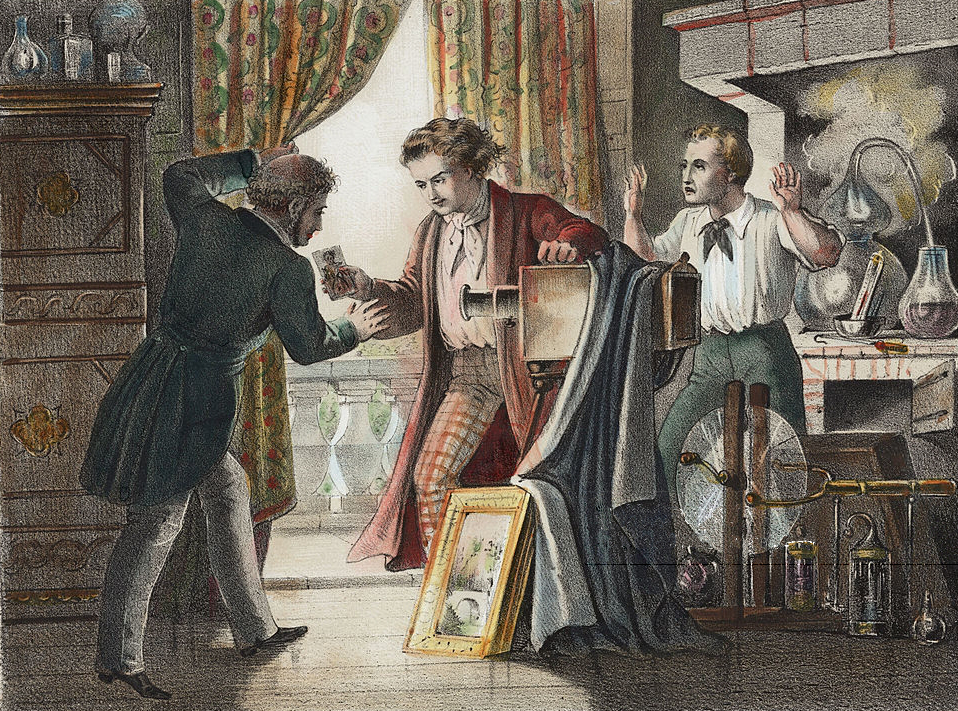
Chromolithograph depicting Louis Jacques Mande Daguerre and Claude Félix Abel Niépce.

Claude Félix Abel Niépce (French: [klod njɛps]; 1764 – early 1828) was a French inventor and the older brother of the more celebrated Nicéphore Niépce. Claude traveled to England to try to find a sponsor for their internal combustion engine and died there. His brother's later successful development of photography has eclipsed the part played by Claude.

== Life ==
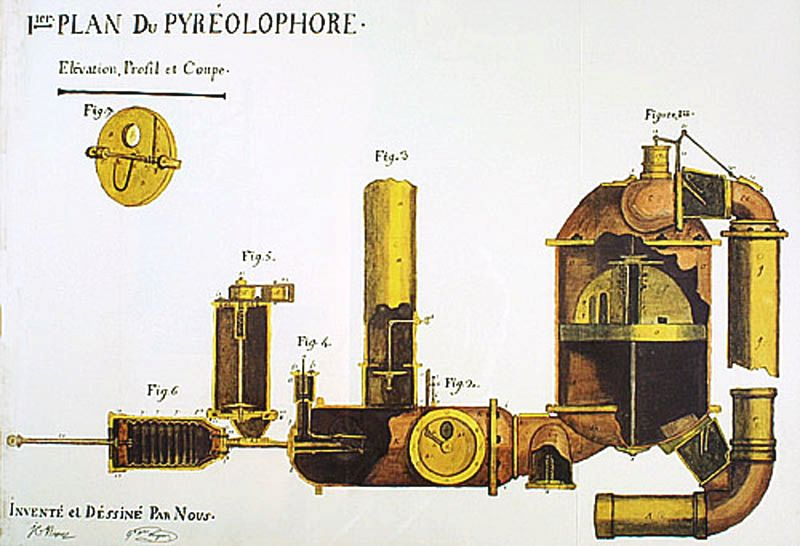
Diagram of the first internal combustion engine, the Pyreolophore, of 1806 which was powered by a mixture of coal dust and lycopodium powder.

Claude Félix Abel Niépce was born to Claudine Thérèse Augustine (née De Courteville) and Bernard Niepce, a lawyer, on 28 October 1764, in Chalon-sur-Saône, in Burgundy. His family of landowners had connections to the Royal Court. His younger brother Nicéphore, who during the French Revolution had served in Sardinia and Italy, retired from the army in 1794 to recover from an eye disorder, and settled in Nice. Claude joined him there and they conceived the idea of an internal-combustion engine.

In 1801, they returned to oversee the family estate, Le Gras, in the village of Saint-Loup-de-Varennes, near Chalon and there they worked together on a number of projects, including the innovative hydraulic engine powered by a mixture of coal dust and lycopodium powder – the Pyréolophore, the world's first internal combustion boat motor – which they tested successfully on the nearby River Saône. Responding to the imperial government's public competition in 1807, the brothers developed a hydraulic pump system to replace the one at Bougival, on the Seine river, used to deliver water to the Palace of Versailles which pumped water up an elevation of one kilometre. They proposed a simpler system requiring only two pump housings, two pistons, three valves, and a ram. They were unsuccessful; the submission eventually accepted in 1809, and subsequently built, was Jacques-Constantin Périer's steam engine.

Claude and Nicéphore were granted a patent for their internal combustion engine by the Emperor Napoleon Bonaparte in 1807. They continued experimentation, using liquid fuel instead of powder, including a natural asphalt known as Bitumen of Judea, and in the process developed in effect the first fuel injection system. Life in post-revolutionary France was difficult and by 1817 they could not attract subsidy and investment, so the ten-year patent expired, despite the improvements to its design. Worried about losing control of the engine, Claude traveled first to Paris and then to England in an attempt to further the project. He received the patent consent of King George III on 23 December 1817.

The patent was not the key to success, however. Over the next ten years, Claude remained in London, settled in Kew and suffered increasing mental illness which caused him to squander much of the family fortune chasing inappropriate business opportunities for the Pyréolophore. Independently, from 1816, Nicéphore experimented with the use of the light-sensitive resins, including the bitumen of Judea previously used as a fuel for the pyréolophore, to coat lithographs stones or plates intended for ink printing as a means of reproducing camera images. In around 1824, he succeeded in producing the first permanent lens images, samples of which he brought to London, via Paris, to visit Claude who had fallen ill. Claude died in early 1828.

Their cousin army lieutenant Abel Niépce de Saint-Victor was also a photographic inventor.
