= Photoengraving =

Type of engraving process

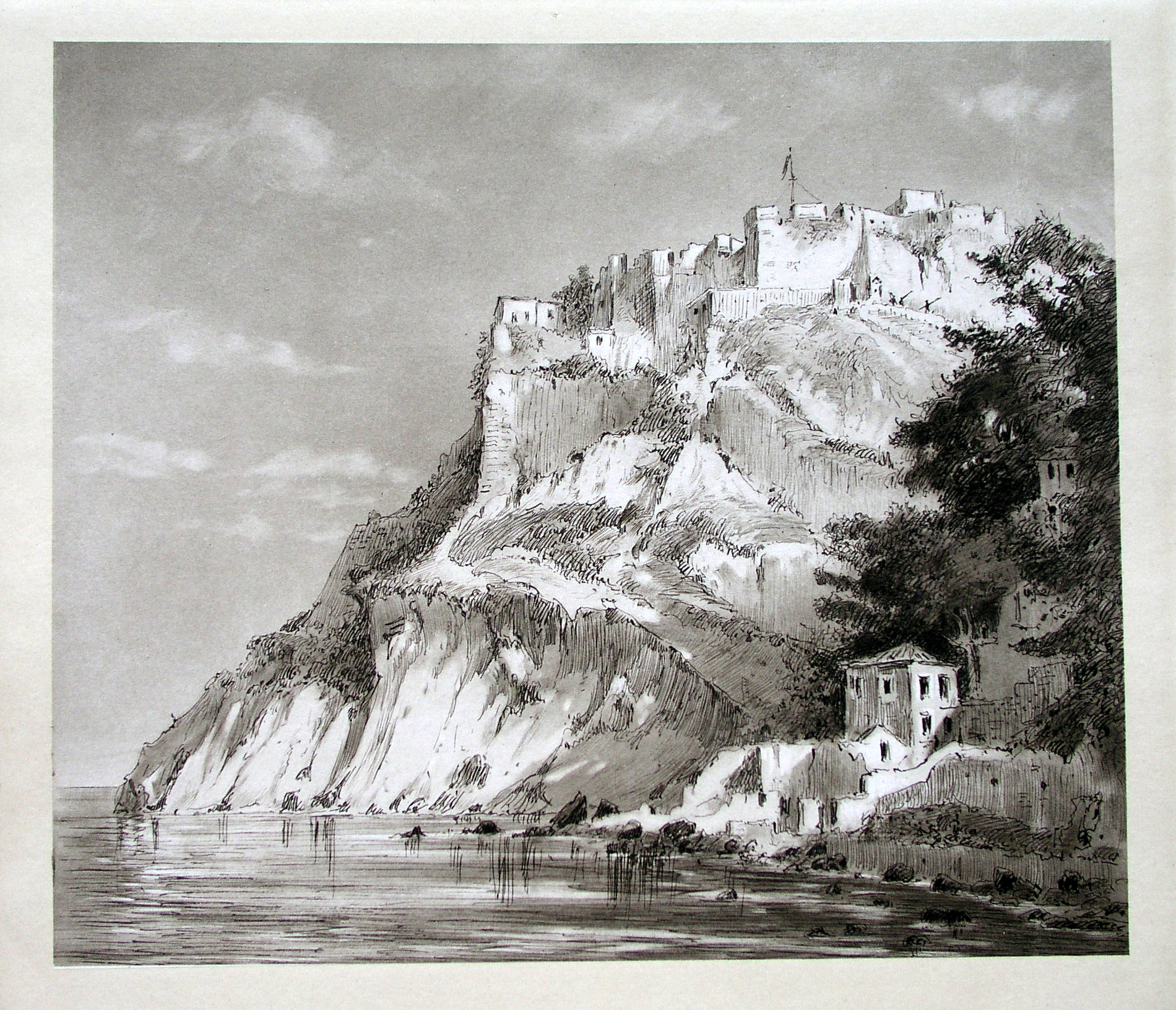
A print made in 1907 from a photoengraved plate. It reproduces a sketch of Parga's castle made by Ludwig Salvator.

Photoengraving is a process that uses a light-sensitive photoresist applied to the surface to be engraved to create a mask that protects some areas during a subsequent operation which etches, dissolves, or otherwise removes some or all of the material from the unshielded areas of a substrate. Normally applied to metal, it can also be used on glass, plastic and other materials.

A photoresist is selected which is resistant to the particular acid or other etching compound to be used. It may be a liquid applied by brushing, spraying, pouring or other means and then allowed to set, or it may come in sheet form and be applied by laminating. It is then exposed to light—usually strong ultraviolet (UV) light—through a photographic, mechanically printed, or manually created image or pattern on transparent film. Alternatively, a lens may be used to project an image directly onto it. Typically, the photoresist is hardened where it receives sufficient exposure to light, but some photoresists are initially hard and are then softened by exposure. A solvent is used to wash away the soft parts, laying bare the underlying material, which is then bathed in or sprayed with the acid or other etchant. The remaining photoresist is usually removed after the operation is complete.

In the graphic arts, photoengraving is used to make printing plates for various printing processes, reproducing a wide variety of graphics such as lettering, line drawings and photographs. Photogravure and screen printing are examples of such process.

The same procedure is used to make printed circuit boards, foil-stamping dies and embossing dies. It is also used to make nameplates, commemorative plaques and other decorative engravings. It can be used to make flat springs, levers, gears and other practical components that would otherwise be fabricated from sheet metal by cutting, drilling, jigsawing or stamping. A very high degree of precision is possible. In these applications, it is properly called photochemical machining, but the terms photochemical milling, chemical milling and photoetching are sometimes used. A similar process called photolithography is used to make integrated circuits.

== Methods ==
One method of photoengraving produces a shallow depression in the metal. This is used for intaglio printing plates or for decorative purposes. It is also the same method used for printed circuit boards. The engraving is usually made in copper or brass. The process can be done in open trays but is much more effective if the etchant (often ferric chloride) is sprayed onto the metal. When ferric chloride is used as the etchant, no metal parts other than titanium can be used in the etching equipment. Decorative engraving is often filled by spray-painting then sanding to remove the paint from the raised parts of the engraving.

Another method produces a deep engraving with sloped shoulders. In this method, the metal (usually zinc or magnesium) is held face down and a mixture of nitric acid and a soap-like oil is splashed onto it. As the acid etches the surface, the oil adheres to the edges of the exposed area. This progressively reduces the area being etched, resulting in a sloped edge; a single dot will end up as a cone-shaped mound protruding from the etched area. This method is used for printing plates (the shoulder supports the printing surface), foil stamping dies and embossing dies. Decorative engravings made by this method may go through a second process to produce a decorative background. The raised parts and their shoulders are painted with an etchant-resistant material and a pattern of etchant-resistant material is applied to the deep parts of the engraving. The resist for the background may be another photoengraving or may be randomly splashed on. The engraving is etched again for a short time to produce a raised pattern in the background. Decorative engravings of this type may also be spray-painted and sanded as in the previous method.

In traditional print shop practice, a special very-large-format camera is used to image the source material either directly onto the photosensitive coating, or onto a sheet of photographic film which is then developed and contact-printed onto the coated plate. In large-scale commercial printing, computer-driven optoelectronic equivalents began to replace these methods in the 1970s. In the case of line cuts (graphics in solid blacks and whites without gradations of gray or color), the photoengraving is done on zinc, and the result is called a zinc etching. In the case of halftone cuts, the work is done on copper. The halftone effect is accomplished by photographing the subject through a wire or glass screen, which breaks the image up into a pattern of dots with sizes corresponding to the local brightness of the image; the larger dots create the darker areas, the smaller dots the highlights. The finer the screen, the finer the detail possible in the printed product. Halftones made with a screen having 65 lines to the inch are considered coarse. Those having 150 lines to the inch are considered fine.

== History ==
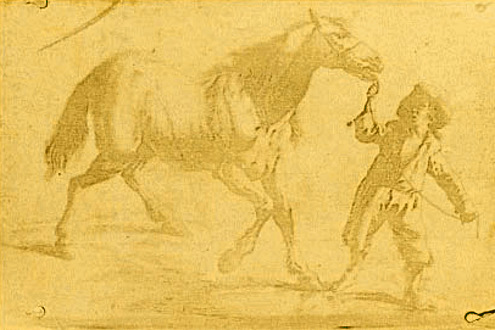
The oldest known print made from a photoengraved plate, by Nicéphore Niépce in 1825. It reproduces a 17th-century Flemish engraving. Niépce called the process "Heliography".

The first photoengraving process was developed in the 1820s by Nicéphore Niépce, which used photoresist to make a one-off camera photograph rather than a printing plate. His usual test subjects were paper prints of conventional engravings, and exposure was by contact under direct sunlight rather than by the use of a camera. Several metals were tried for the printing plate, as well as glass and lithographic stone. His first success came in 1822. The earliest known surviving example of a paper print made from one of his photoengraved plates dates to 1825 and reproduces a 17th-century engraving.

Niépce used Bitumen of Judea as the photoresist. Initially soluble in various spirits and oils, a thin coating of bitumen hardens (polymerizes) where it is exposed to light. The unexposed parts can then be rinsed away with a solvent, baring the underlying material, which can then be etched to the desired depth. Niépce's process lay dormant for many years, but it was revived in the 1850s and bitumen was widely used as a photoresist far into the 20th century. Very long exposures in bright light were required, but bitumen had the advantage that it was superbly resistant to strong acids.

The use of photoengraving for a halftone process that could be used to print grayscale photographic images dates back to the 1839 introduction of the daguerreotype, the first practical photographic process. The daguerreotype image consisted of a microscopically fine granular structure on the surface of a silver-plated copper sheet that had been polished to a mirror finish. Methods were soon devised for differentially etching the image grains and the ground so that the daguerreotype could be used as a printing plate. In some instances, very pleasing results were obtained, but exceptional skill and care were required and the very fine structure of the image limited the useful life of each plate to a few hundred prints at best.

Henry Fox Talbot is usually credited with the first workable process for converting a grayscale image into a varying structure of stark black and white that resulted in a reasonably durable printing plate. As with other early halftone processes, the plate could not be combined with ordinary type, so for inclusion in a book or periodical each image had to be printed separately and either bound in or tipped in with an adhesive.

Frederic E. Ives is usually credited with the first commercially successful process that was compatible with ordinary letterpress printing, so that halftone blocks could be printed along with blocks of text in books, periodicals and newspapers. His process came into widespread use during the 1890s, largely replacing the hand-engraved wood and metal blocks that had previously served to provide illustrations.

As in many other fields of invention, there are conflicting claims of priority, instances of simultaneous invention, and variously nuanced definitions of the terminology, so sorting out the merits of the "first" claims made on behalf of the many inventors in the field of halftone reproduction—not infrequently biased by nationalistic sentiments—can be very problematic.

== See also ==
- Photogravure
- Robert T. Teamoh
