= Saint-Loup-de-Varennes =

- Commune
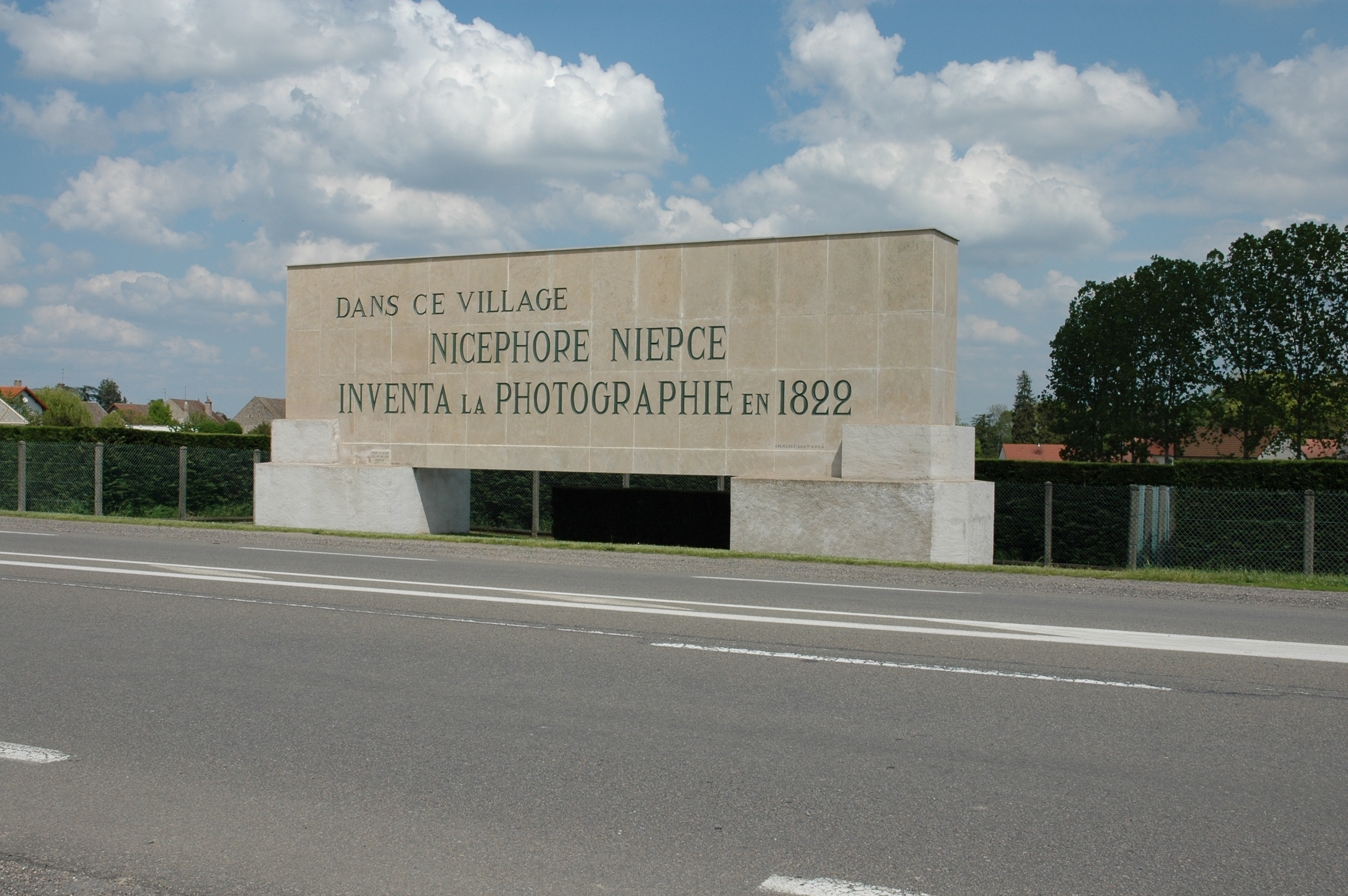
- A sign showing the name of the inventor of photography

- Coat of arms
- Location of Saint-Loup-de-Varennes
- Location within France Location within Bourgogne-Franche-Comté
- Coordinates: 46°43′43″N 4°51′41″E
- Country: France
- Region: Bourgogne-Franche-Comté
- Department: Saône-et-Loire
- Arrondissement: Chalon-sur-Saône
- Canton: Saint-Rémy
- Intercommunality: CA Le Grand Chalon

Government
  - Mayor (2020–2026): Gérard Rigaud
- Area^{1}: 8.32 km^{2} (3.21 sq mi)
- Elevation: 191 m (627 ft)
- Highest elevation: 205 m (673 ft)
- Lowest elevation: 171 m (561 ft)
- Population (2023): 1,271
  - Density: 153/km^{2} (396/sq mi)
- Time zone: UTC+01:00 (CET)
  - Summer (DST): UTC+02:00 (CEST)
- INSEE/Postal code: 71444 /71240
- ^{1} French Land Register data, which excludes lakes, ponds, glaciers > 1 km^{2} (0.386 sq mi or 247 acres) and river estuaries.

Saint-Loup-de-Varennes (French pronunciation: [sɛ̃ lu də vaʁɛn], literally Saint-Loup of Varennes) is a commune in the Saône-et-Loire department in the region of Bourgogne-Franche-Comté in eastern France.

The commune is home to the world's oldest surviving photograph, View from the Window at Le Gras, taken in 1827.

== Geography ==
It is 6 km (3.7 mi) south of the centre of Chalon-sur-Saône.

== Historical significance ==
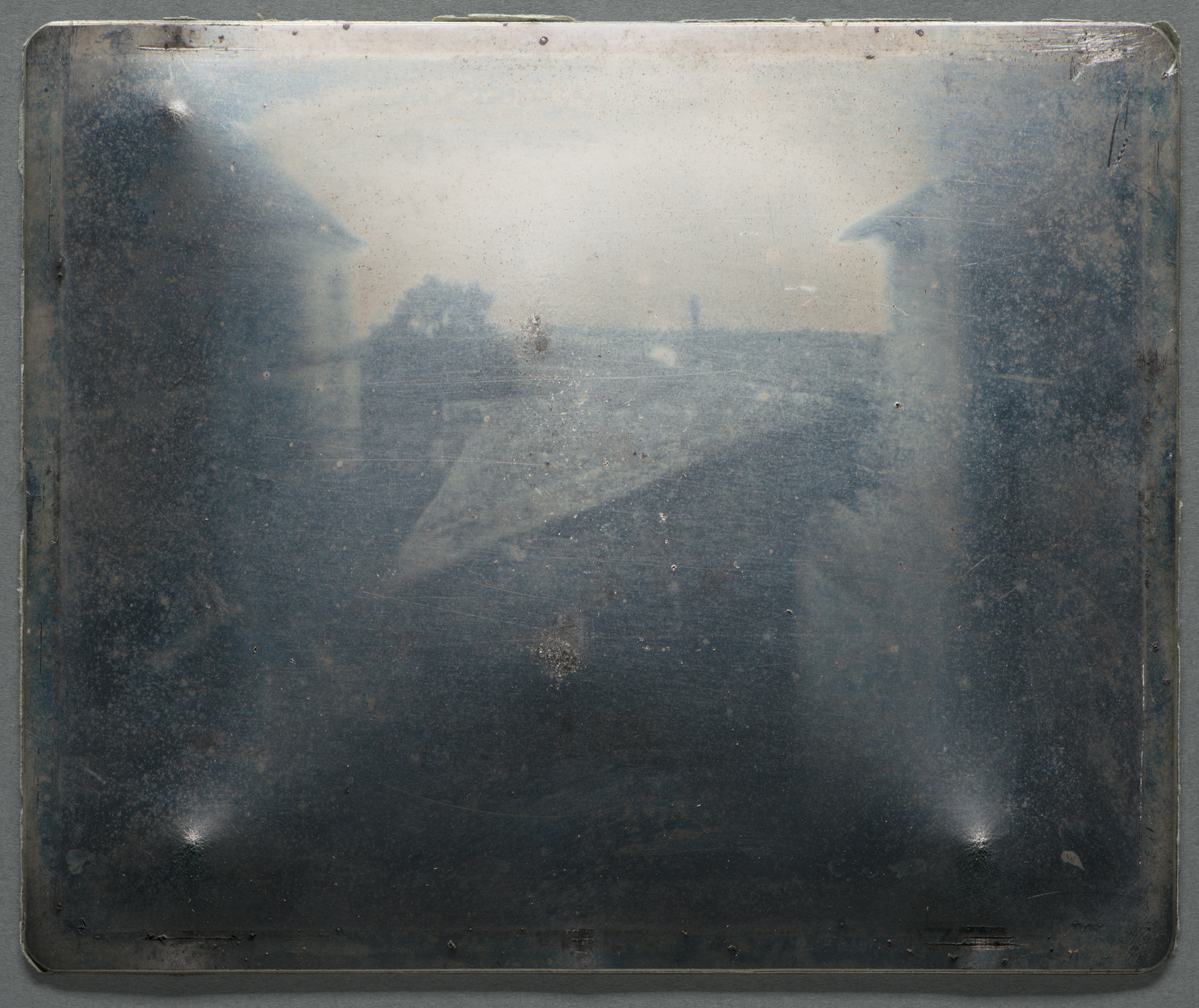
View from the Window at Le Gras, one of Nicéphore Niépce's earliest surviving photographs

Nicéphore Niépce, the inventor of photography, lived in Saint-Loup-de-Varennes, where he died in 1833. Most or all of his photographs, including one taken in 1827 and now the oldest known surviving camera photograph, were made at Le Gras, his ancestral family estate in this village.

== See also ==
- Communes of the Saône-et-Loire department
