= Abel Niépce de Saint-Victor =

French photographic inventor

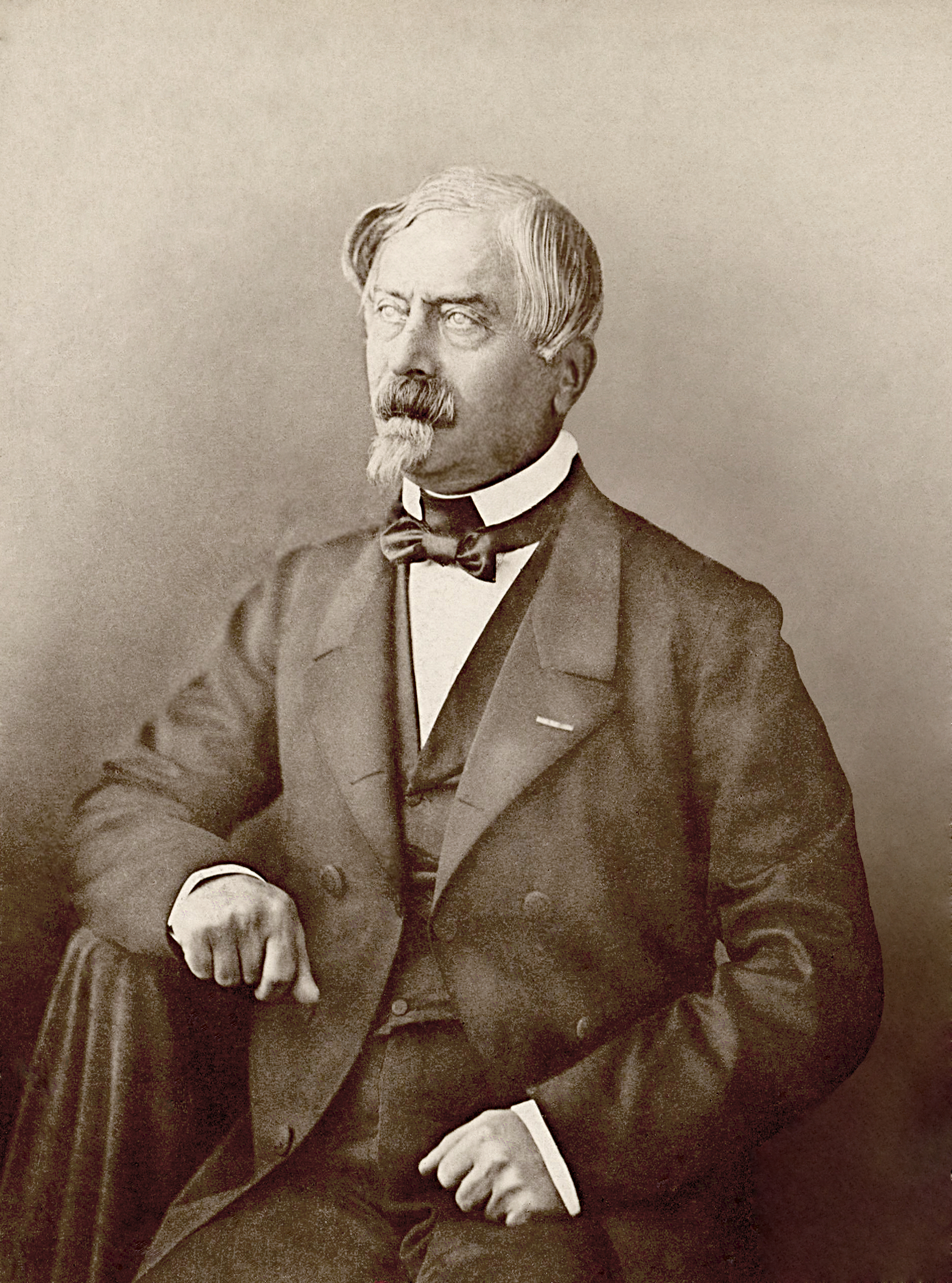
- Photograph of Saint-Victor, c. 1860, taken by Nadar
- Born: 26 July 1805; Saint-Cyr, Saône-et-Loire
- Died: 7 April 1870 (aged 64); Paris
- Occupation: Photographer
- Known for: Near-discovery of radioactivity
- Relatives: Nicéphore Niépce (cousin), Claude Niépce (cousin)

Claude Félix Abel Niépce de Saint-Victor (26 July 1805, Saint-Cyr, Saône-et-Loire – 7 April 1870, Paris) was a French photographic inventor. Claude was an army lieutenant and the cousin of Nicéphore Niépce. He first experimented in 1847 with negatives made with albumen on glass, a method subsequently used by Frederick Langenheim for his and his brother’s lantern slides. At his laboratory near Paris, Saint-Victor worked on the fixation of natural photographic colour as well as the perfection of his cousin's heliographing process for photomechanical printing. His method of photomechanical printing, called heliogravure, was published in 1856 in Traité pratique de gravure héliographique. In the 1850s, he also published frequently in La Lumière.

== Near-discovery of radioactivity ==
In the 1850s, Saint-Victor was developing color photography using light-sensitive metal salts, including uranium salts. In 1857, long before Henri Becquerel's discovery of radioactivity, Saint-Victor observed that, even in complete darkness, certain salts could expose photographic emulsions. He found that uranium salts were responsible for this anomalous phenomenon. Photographers in France, England, and Germany confirmed Niépce's findings regarding uranium. Niépce recognized that the light that was exposing his photographic plates was neither conventional phosphorescence nor fluorescence, and that the salts could expose photographic plates long after the salts had last been exposed to sunlight. Niépce's superior, Michel Eugène Chevreul, recognized the phenomenon as a fundamental discovery, pointing out that uranium salts retained their power to expose photographic plates even after six months in the dark. In 1861, Niépce stated that uranium salts emitted some sort of radiation that was invisible to the human eye:

Original : " ... cette activité persistante ... ne peut même pas être de la phosphorescence, car elle ne durerait pas si longtemps, d'après les expériences de M. Edmond Becquerel; il est donc plus probable que c'est un rayonnement invisible à nos yeux, comme le croit M. Léon Foucault, ... ." Translation : " ... this persistent activity ... cannot be due to phosphorescence, for it [i.e., phosphorescence] would not last so long, according to the experiments of Mr. Edmond Becquerel; it is thus more likely that it is a radiation that is invisible to our eyes, as Mr. Léon Foucault believes, ... ."

Niépce mentions Edmond Becquerel, the father of Henri Becquerel, who would later be credited with the discovery of radioactivity. In 1868, Edmond Becquerel published a book, La lumière: ses causes et ses effets (Light: its causes and its effects), in which he mentioned Niépce's findings; specifically, that objects that were coated with uranium nitrate could expose photographic plates in the dark.
