= Physautotype =

Early photographic process

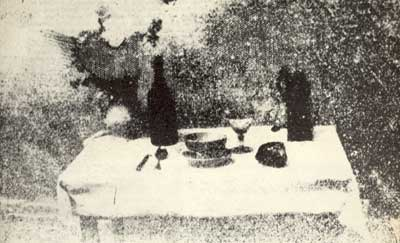
19th century printed reproduction of a still life believed to be a circa 1832 Niépce physautotype (glass original accidentally destroyed circa 1900)

The physautotype (from French) was a photographic process, invented in the course of his investigation of heliography, by Joseph Nicéphore Niépce and Louis Jacques Mandé Daguerre in 1832, in which images were produced by the use of lavender oil residue dissolved in alcohol as the photographic agent. The solution was coated onto a silver or glass plate and allowed to dry, after which it left a uniform white deposit on the plate. The plate was then exposed in a camera obscura for about 8 hours and developed with petroleum-based spirit vapors, which caused the least strongly exposed areas to become proportionally more transparent, creating a photographic image that was positive when viewed against a darker background.

== Brief history ==
In 1827 Niépce travelled to England, mainly to visit his brother Claude. On his way, Niépce met in Paris with Louis Daguerre, who had a reputation as a camera obscura specialist. Hoping to shorten the exposure time of his bitumen process, Niépce went into partnership with Daguerre in 1829. This association did not bring any noticeable progress to the bitumen process; however, the two partners discovered new photographic processes using as photosensitive agents tree resins and the residue of lavender oil distillation. With those, the exposure time went down to about 8 hours in the sun. Niépce died in 1833.

== Chemical principle ==
The resin is melted and a little portion of it is dissolved on alcohol. Then a silver plate, a glass plate or a mirror is coated with the solution and allowed to dry on a tray. Once it's completely dry, the alcohol evaporation leaves a residue of tiny dispersed resin particles that give the plate a white, blurry appearance.

When exposed to the sun, the exposed areas seem to polymerize becoming insoluble, while the unexposed areas are still soluble. The plate is developed over a tray with spirits like kerosene and turpentine, which wash away the unexposed areas. The process lasts 5 to 10 minutes, and the solvent must never touch the plate. If left over the vapors for longer, the plate continues developing itself, with the final product of a clear plate with nothing on it.

== Process ==
The photosensitive agent of this process fine-tuned by Niépce and Daguerre in 1832 was the residue of lavender oil distillation.

1. Niépce and Daguerre obtained this residue evaporating lavender oil by heating it until they got a dry product. After evaporation, only a dark brown tar desiccated by heat is left, becoming hard and brittle. Nowadays the lavender oil and the evaporation process is usually replaced with the use of violin rosin that's melted without any further treatment.
2. Niépce and Daguerre would then dissolve a small amount of this tar in alcohol, then pour the solution on a well polished silver plate. Modern photographers interested in the process found out that the solution has to be about 1%. Any dirt or grease on the plate will show on the final image.
3. After the alcohol evaporation, a uniform white deposit remained on the plate. The thus prepared plate was exposed to light in the camera obscura for about 7 to 8 hours.
4. After exposure, the plate was put upside down above a tray holding oil of white petroleum (something like kerosene or turpentine). The fumes of this kerosene were sufficient to develop the image without any further treatment.

The process gives directly positive images, since the white deposit remains on the plate, at places that were touched by light, while the kerosene fumes render transparent the zones that were not illuminated. However, with the effect of reflections on the metal appearing at places where the white deposit has become transparent, images can be seen as positive or negative.

== La Table servie ==
In 1999 Jean-Louis Marignier identified the image known as La Table servie (The Set Table) as a physautotype by Niépce and one of his last works. In 2004 Marignier and M. Lourseau reconstructed the table and photographed it with the physautotype process; after an exposure of about four hours, the plate showed an image very similar to the original.
