= Heliography =

First permanent photographic process

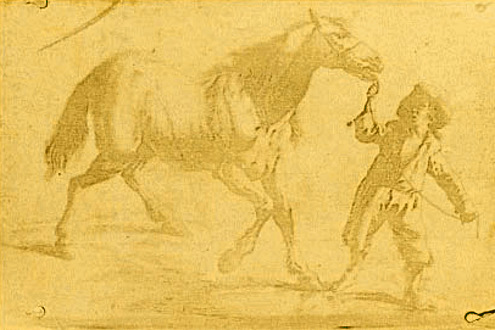
This earliest known surviving heliographic engraving, printed from a metal plate made in 1825 by Joseph Nicéphore Niépce using his "heliographic process". The plate was exposed under an ordinary engraving. Heliography was also used to capture a scene directly from nature with a camera.

Heliography (Note: Heliography is from Greek: helios (ἥλιος), meaning 'sun', and graphein (γράφειν), 'writing'.) is an early photographic process, based on the hardening of bitumen in sunlight. It was invented by Nicéphore Niépce around 1822. Niépce used the process to make the earliest known surviving photograph from nature, View from the Window at Le Gras (1826 or 1827), and the first realisation of photoresist as means to reproduce artworks through inventions of photolithography and photogravure.

== Invention ==
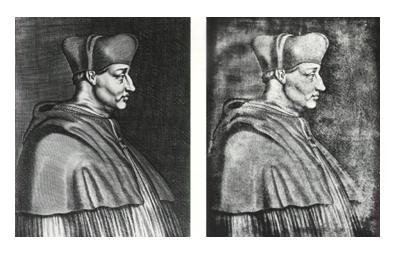
Comparison between the original engraving and the heliography of Joseph Nicephore Niépce. Left: Engraving of Portrait of Georges d'Amboise, 1650 right: Heliography (Heliogravure) of the engraving, 1826

Nicéphore Niépce began experiments with the aim of achieving a photo-etched printmaking technique in 1811.

He knew that the acid-resistant Bitumen of Judea used in etching hardened with exposure to light. In experiments he coated it on plates of glass, zinc, copper and silver-surfaced copper, pewter and limestone (lithography), and found the surface exposed to the most light resisted dissolution in oil of lavender and petroleum, so that the uncoated shadow areas might be traditionally treated through acid etching and aquatint to print black ink.

By 1822 he had made the first light-resistant heliographic copy of an engraving, made without a lens by placing the print in contact with the light sensitive plate. In 1826 he increasingly used pewter plates because their reflective surface made the image more clearly visible.

Niépce prepared a synopsis of his experiments in November 1829: On Heliography, or a method of automatically fixing by the action of light the image formed in the camera obscura which outlines his intention to use his “Heliographic” method of photogravure or photolithography as a means of making lithographic, intaglio or relief master plates for multiple printed reproductions in ink.

Although heliography did not achieve his intentions during Niépce's lifetime, it was further developed by his nephew Claude Félix Abel Niépce de Saint-Victor; in 1855, with the help of the copper engraver Lemaître, he succeeded in etching the heliographs and producing prints from them, laying the foundation for later photoengraving processes.

== Camera pictures ==
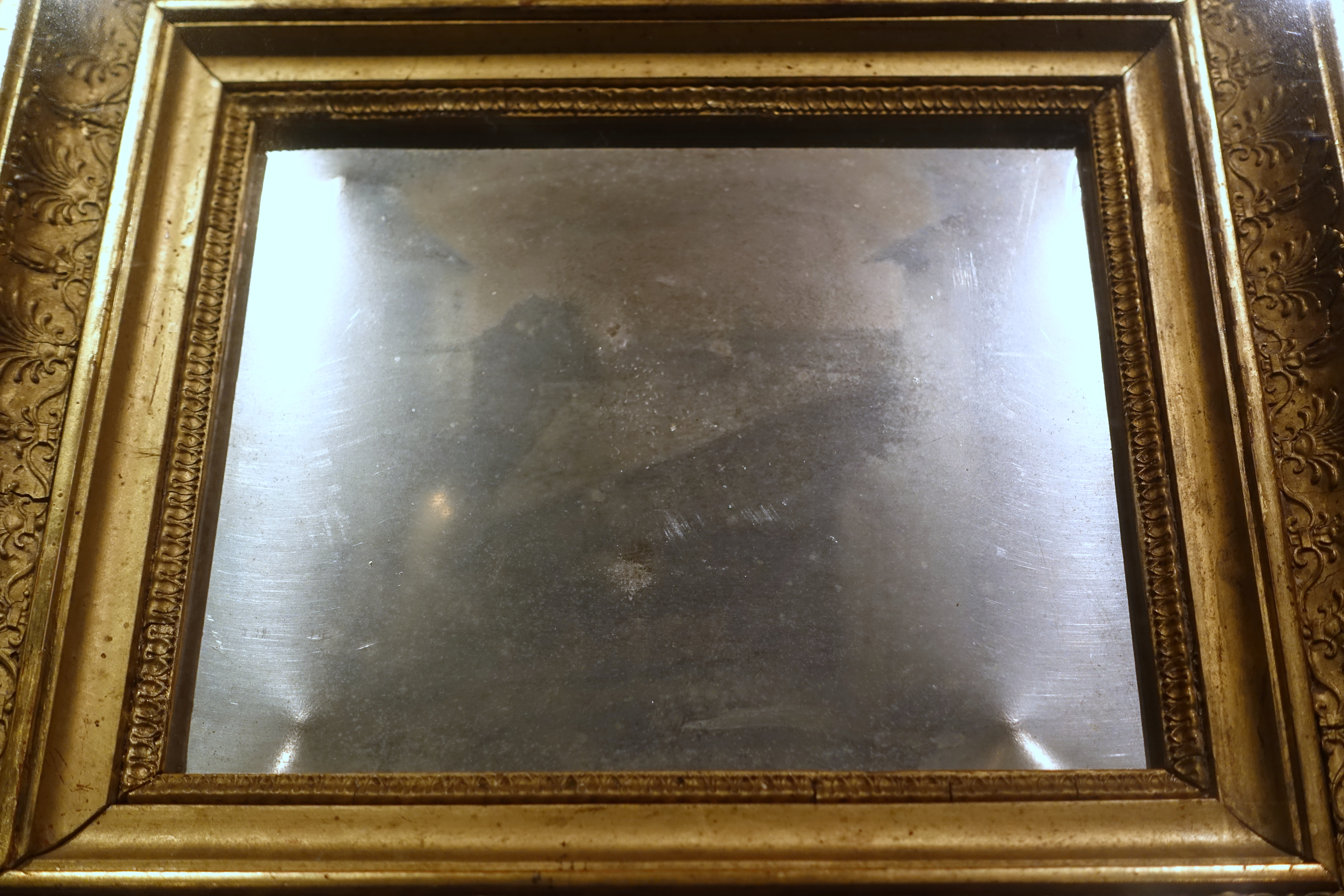
View from the Window at Le Gras, by Joseph Nicephore Niepce, 1826 or 1827, France - Harry Ransom Center - University of Texas at Austin

Niépce also worked on camera images, which, aware of their commercial potential, he ambiguously called “points de vue” in his letters to his brother. As early as 1816 he had limited success with paper coated with muriate (chloride) of silver, placed in a homemade camera obscura to record views from his workroom window; however, the images were not permanent.

It is certain that in the summer of 1826 Niépce succeeded for the first time in creating permanent photographic images projected by a lens onto the plate inside a camera obscura. Georges Poitonniée asserts, based on the Niépce brothers correspondence, that the first such image was produced as early as 1822. The process used was low in sensitivity; Helmut Gernsheim estimated the exposure time might be eight hours, while Marignier, based on his attempts to recreate the technique, as well evidence from Niépce's letters, considered three or more days more likely.

== Precursor to the daguerreotype ==
The exposed and solvent-treated plate itself, as in the case of View from the Window at Le Gras, rediscovered by Gernsheim, presents a negative or positive image dependent upon ambient reflection in the 20.3 × 16.5 centimetre pewter plate. By viewing the plate at an appropriate angle the viewer sees the shadow areas reflecting dark in contrast to the lighter film of bitumen, producing a legible, if elusive, positive picture of buildings, a tree, and the landscape beyond. In this regard it was not unlike the daguerreotype which itself was based on Niépce's discoveries taken up by Louis-Jacques-Mandé Daguerre who in 1826 had heard through the Parisian opticians Charles and Vincent Chevalier that Niépce, who purchased sophisticated lenses from them, had been using bitumen of Judea to print images on pewter. By then, Niépce had begun using iodine vapors to darken the light parts of camera images produced on silver plates, rendering a positive image. Daguerre and Niépce corresponded, each hesitant to divulge the extent of his progress to the other.

== Partnership with Daguerre ==
After both felt they could develop their work more quickly in collaboration, they formed a company on 14 December 1829.

Daguerre preferred the “negative” image obtained on bitumen, and together they invented a new process that rendered a single, unique image, the physautotype, which exploited the photosensitivity of the residue from oil of lavender dissolved in alcohol, resulting in an image that, like the daguerreotype, appeared either positive or negative depending on the angle of reflected light.

Daguerre continued to perfect the process to render a unique image using iodine, not to intensify the image, but because of its photosensitivity when applied to silver plates as a vapor. This led Daguerre to the daguerreotype process, in which mercury fumes brought out the latent image in the silver iodide on plates exposed to light in a camera. The daguerreotype was shown to members of the French Académie des Sciences on 7 January 1839, and the process was explained in detail at a joint session of the Académie des Sciences and the Académie des Beaux-Arts on 19 August 1839.

Daguerre probably produced his first successful daguerreotypes as early as 1834 and after Niépce's death entered a new partnership with Niépce's son, Isidore, on 9 May 1835, changing the name from “Niépce-Daguerre” to “Daguerre and Isidore Niépce.” On September 27, 1835, he announced the invention as his in the Journal des artistes. Daguerre's highly successful eponymous process, in the specific chemicals and materials used, thus emerged directly out of his partnership with Niépce, whose own discoveries, never fully realised, sank into relative obscurity.

== Chemistry ==
Bitumen has a complex and varied structure of polycyclic aromatic hydrocarbons (linked benzene rings), containing a small proportion of nitrogen and sulphur; its hardening in proportion to its exposure to light is understood to be due to further cross-linking of the rings, as is the hardening of tree resins (colophony, or abietic acid) by light, first noted by Jean Senebier in 1782. The photochemistry of these processes, which has been studied by Jean-Louis Marignier of Université Paris-Sud since the 1990s, is still to be fully understood.

== Alternative meanings ==
The word has also been used to refer to other phenomena: for description of the sun (cf. geography), for photography in general, for signalling by heliograph (a device less commonly called a heliotrope or helio-telegraph), and for photography of the sun.

Although named “héliographie” by Niépce, in the later 19th century “heliography” was used generally for all “sun-printing;” with “heliographic processes” coining to mean specifically the reprographic copying for line, rather than continuous tone, images. The abbreviations héliog. or héliogr., found on old reproductions, may stand for the French word héliogravure, and can then refer to any form of photogravure.

== Other early photographic procedures ==
- Physautotype (around 1832)
- Daguerreotype (1839)
- Calotype (also Talbotype, 1841)
- Ambrotype (around 1850)
- Ferrotype (tintype; around 1850)
- Collodion wet plate (around 1850)
- Wothlytype (1864)
