= View from the Window at Le Gras =

Oldest surviving camera photograph

Coordinates: 46°43′37″N 4°51′26″E

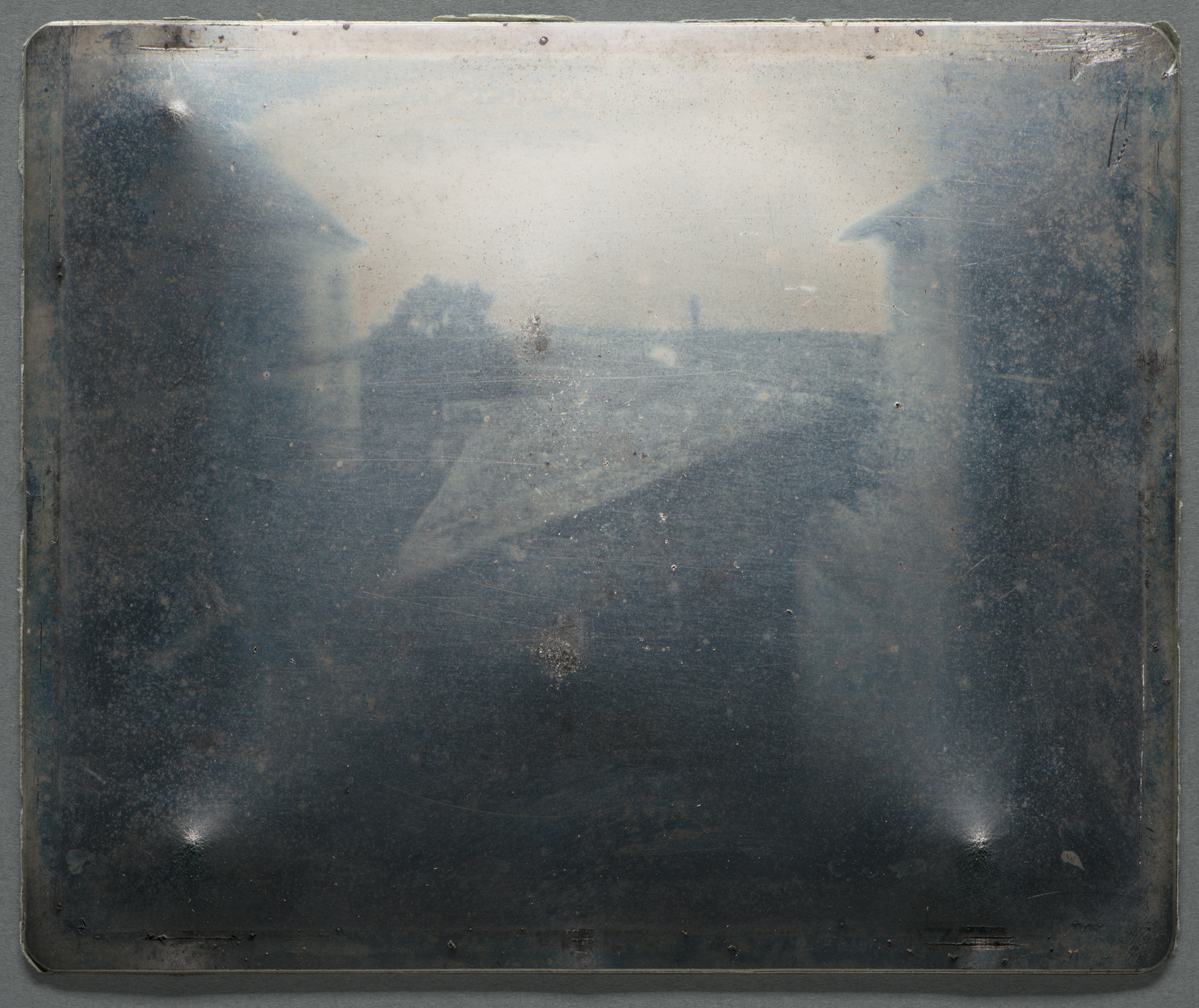
The original plate, showing rooftops visible from a second-story bedroom window

View from the Window at Le Gras (French: Point de vue du Gras or Point de vue pris d'une fenêtre de la propriété du Gras à Saint-Loup-de-Varennes) is the oldest surviving photograph. It was created by French inventor Nicéphore Niépce between June 4 and July 18, 1827, (Note: Gernsheim originally dates the photograph to 1826, but in his 1982's 3rd edition of "The origins of Photography" accepts the date of 1827, as proposed by Harmant & Marillier (1967).) in Saint-Loup-de-Varennes, France, and shows parts of the buildings and surrounding countryside of his estate, Le Gras, as seen from a high window. The image was created by heliography, a process which Niépce had invented around 1822, and which uses the hardening of bitumen in light to record an image after washing off the remaining unhardened material.

== Creation ==
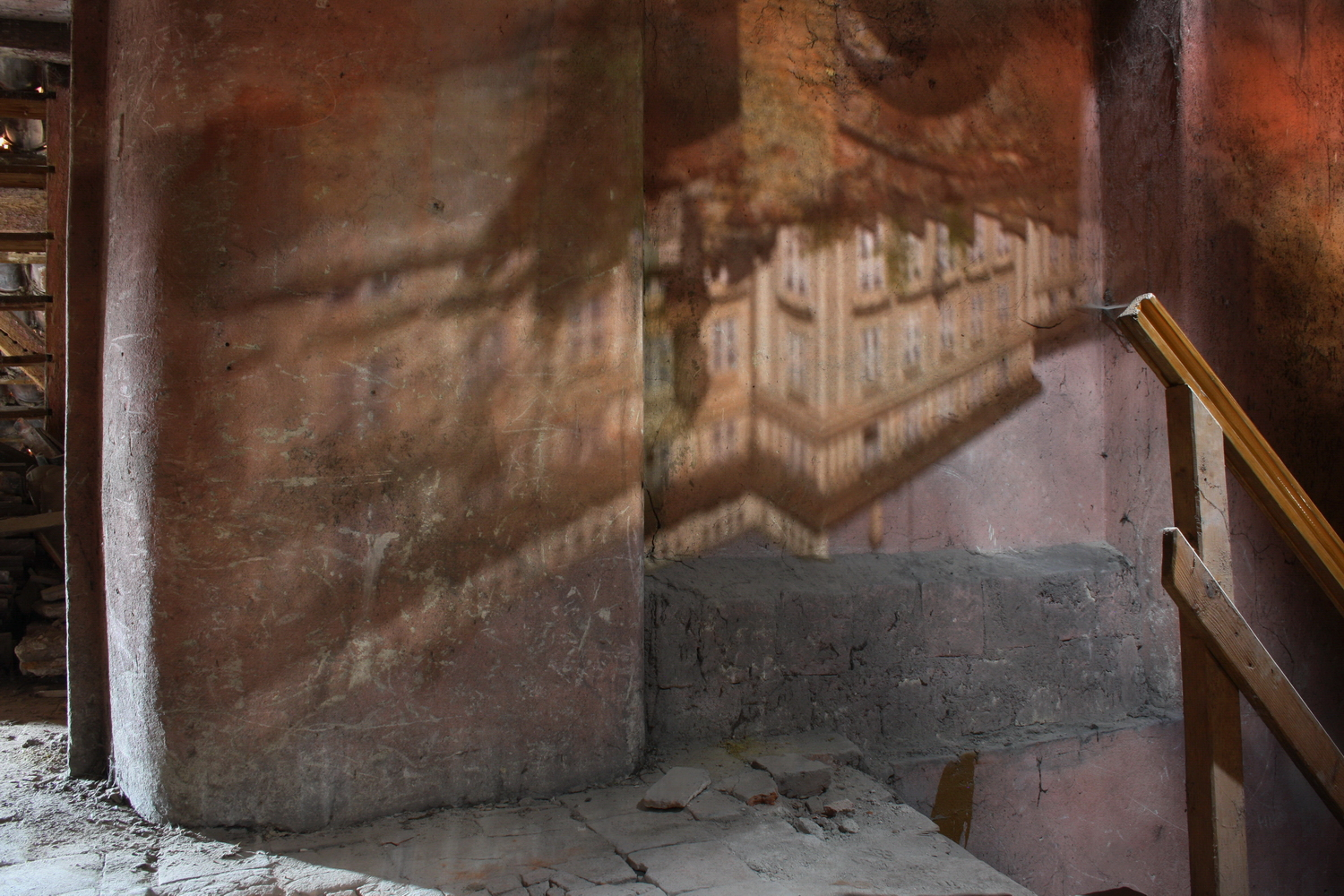
Demonstration of camera obscura. The original image gets rotated and reversed through a small hole onto an opposite surface.

Niépce captured the scene with a camera obscura projected onto a 16.2 cm × 20.2 cm (6.4 in × 8.0 in) pewter plate thinly coated with bitumen of Judea, a naturally occurring asphalt. The bitumen hardened in the brightly lit areas, but in the dimly lit areas it remained soluble and could be washed away with a mixture of lavender oil and white petroleum.

A very long exposure time was required. Sunlight strikes the buildings on opposite sides, suggesting an exposure that lasted about eight hours, which has become the traditional estimate; however, a modern researcher who studied Niépce's notes and recreated his processes found that the exposure must have continued for several days.

== Early history ==
In September 1827, Niépce visited the United Kingdom. He showed this and several other specimens of his work to botanical illustrator Francis Bauer. View from the Window at Le Gras was the only example of a camera photograph; the rest were contact-exposed copies of artwork. Bauer encouraged him to present his "heliography" process to the Royal Society. Niépce wrote and submitted a paper but was unwilling to reveal any specific details, so the Royal Society rejected it under a rule prohibiting presentations on undisclosed processes. Before returning to France, Niépce gave his paper and the specimens to Bauer. Niépce died suddenly in 1833 due to a stroke.

After the pioneering photographic processes of Louis Daguerre and Henry Fox Talbot were publicly announced in January 1839, Bauer championed Niépce's right to be acknowledged as the first inventor of a process for making permanent photographs. On March 9, 1839, the specimens were finally exhibited at the Royal Society. After Bauer died in 1840, they passed through several hands and were occasionally exhibited as historical curiosities. View from the Window at Le Gras was last publicly shown in 1905 and then fell into obscurity for 47 years.

== Re-emergence ==
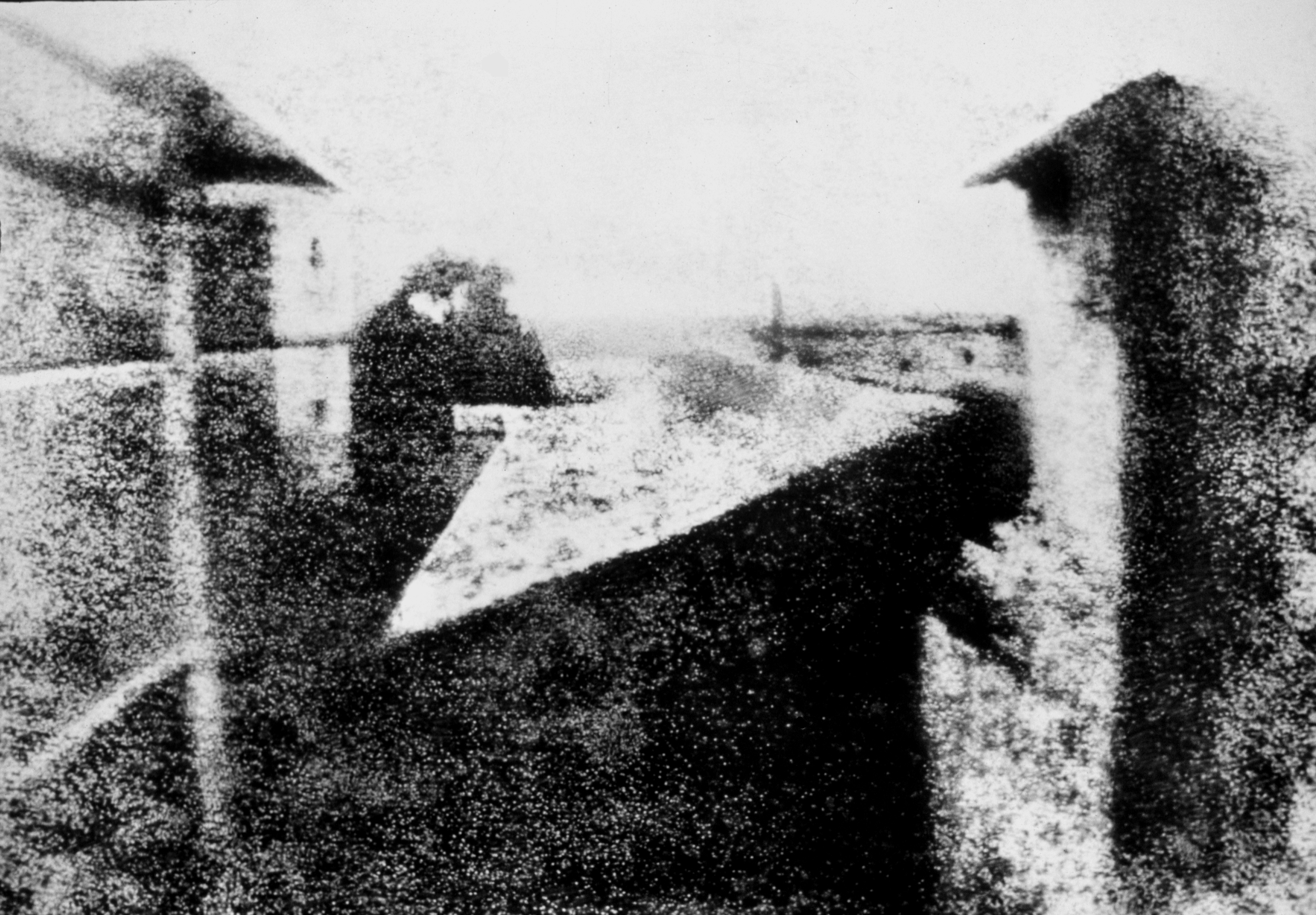
Gernsheim's enhanced version

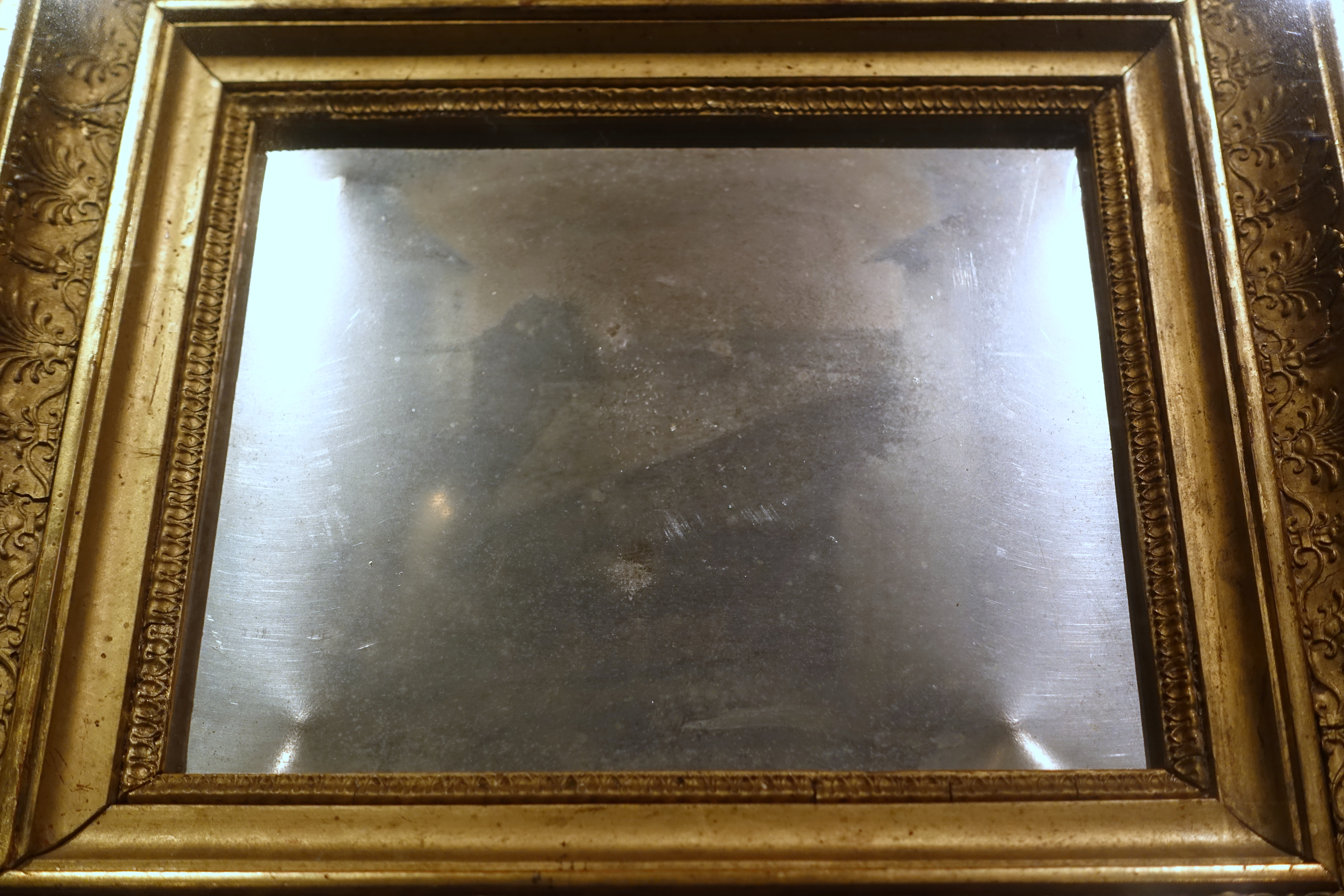
The original plate on display at the Harry Ransom Center in Austin, Texas, in 2004

Historians Helmut Gernsheim and his wife, Alison Gernsheim, tracked down the photograph in 1952 and brought it to prominence, reinforcing the claim that Niépce is the inventor of photography. They had an expert at the Kodak Research Laboratory make a modern photographic copy. Still, it proved extremely difficult to produce an adequate representation of all that could be seen when inspecting the actual plate.

Helmut Gernsheim heavily retouched one of the copy prints to clean it up and make the scene more comprehensible, and until the late 1970s he allowed only that enhanced version to be published. It became apparent that at some point after the 1952 copying, the plate was disfigured and developed bumps near three of its corners, causing light to reflect in ways that interfered with visibility in those areas and in the image as a whole.

During the 1950s and early 1960s, the Gernsheims toured the photograph to several exhibitions in continental Europe. In 1963, Harry Ransom purchased most of the Gernsheims' photography collection for the University of Texas at Austin. Although it has rarely traveled since then, in 2012–2013 it visited Mannheim, Germany, as part of an exhibition entitled The Birth of Photography—Highlights of the Helmut Gernsheim Collection. It is normally on display in the main lobby of the Harry Ransom Center in Austin, Texas.

In 2003, Life magazine listed View from the Window at Le Gras among their 100 Photographs that Changed the World. In an article for Art on Paper, View from the Window at Le Gras was said to have a "fair claim" as the first photograph.

== Scientific analysis and conservation ==
During a study and conservation project in 2002–2003, scientists at the Getty Conservation Institute examined the photograph using X-ray fluorescence spectroscopy, reflectance Fourier transform infrared spectroscopy, and other techniques. They confirmed that the image consists of bitumen and that the metal plate is pewter (tin alloyed with lead, as well as trace amounts of iron, copper, and nickel). The institute also designed and built the elaborate display case system that now houses the artifact in a continuously monitored, stabilized, oxygen-free environment.

In 2007, scientists from the Louvre Museum published an analysis of the photograph using ion beam analysis, with data taken on their 2 MV electrostatic accelerator. This showed the details of the oxidation process that was corroding the image.

== See also ==
- History of photography
- List of photographs considered the most important
