= Nicéphore Niépce =

French inventor (1765–1833)

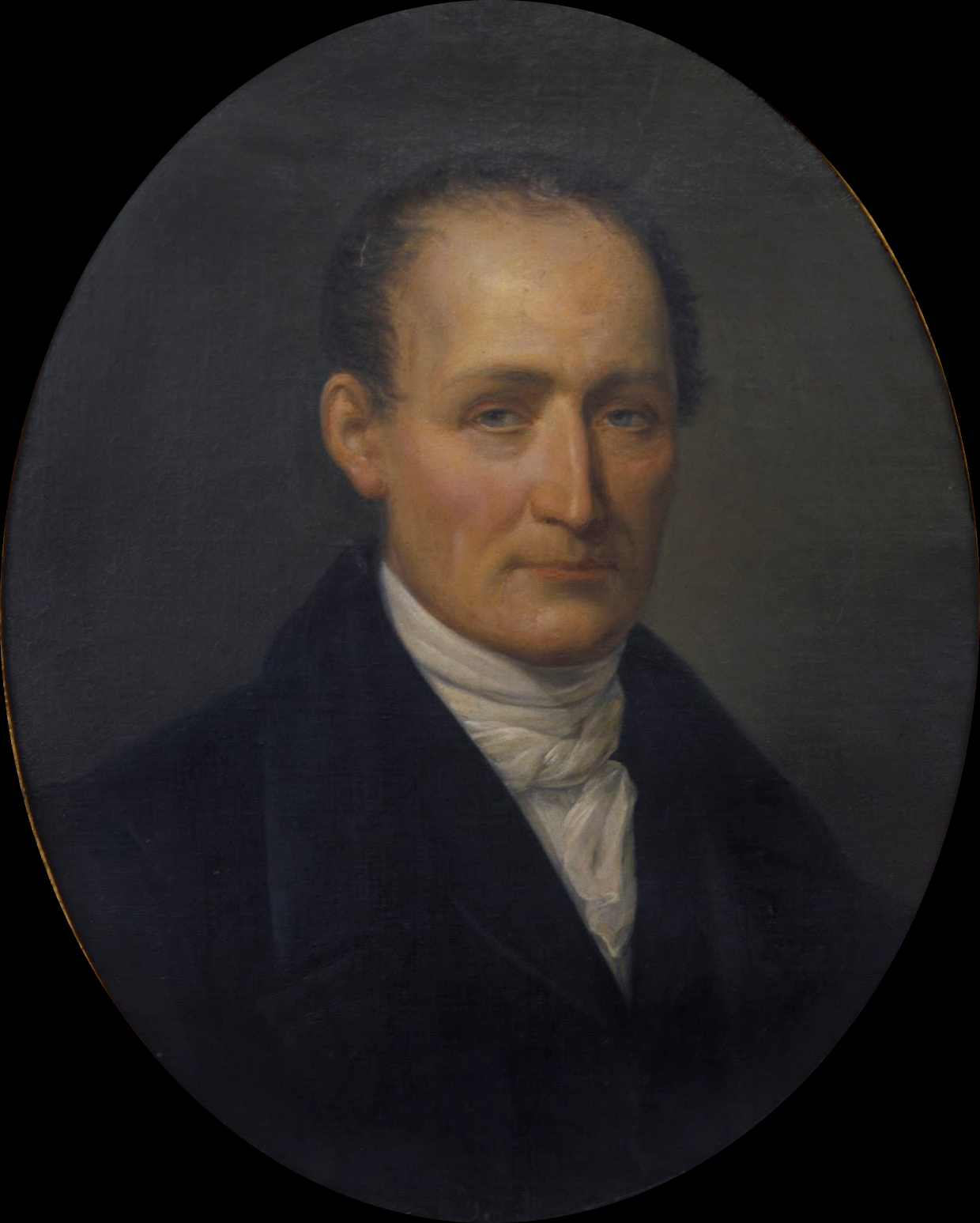
- Posthumous portrait by Léonard François Berger, 1854
- Born: Joseph Nicéphore Niépce; 7 March 1765, Chalon-sur-Saône, Kingdom of France
- Died: 5 July 1833 (aged 68); Saint-Loup-de-Varennes, Kingdom of France
- Occupations: Inventor; photographer
- Years active: 1795–1833
- Known for: Photography; Pyréolophore internal combustion engine

Joseph Nicéphore Niépce (French: [nisefɔʁ njɛps]; 7 March 1765 – 5 July 1833) was a French inventor and one of the pioneers of photography. Niépce developed heliography, a technique he used to create the world's oldest surviving products of a photographic process. In the mid-1820s, he used a primitive camera to produce the oldest surviving photograph of a real-world scene. Among Niépce's other inventions was the Pyréolophore, one of the world's first internal combustion engines, which he conceived, created, and developed with his older brother Claude Niépce.

== Biography ==
=== Early life ===
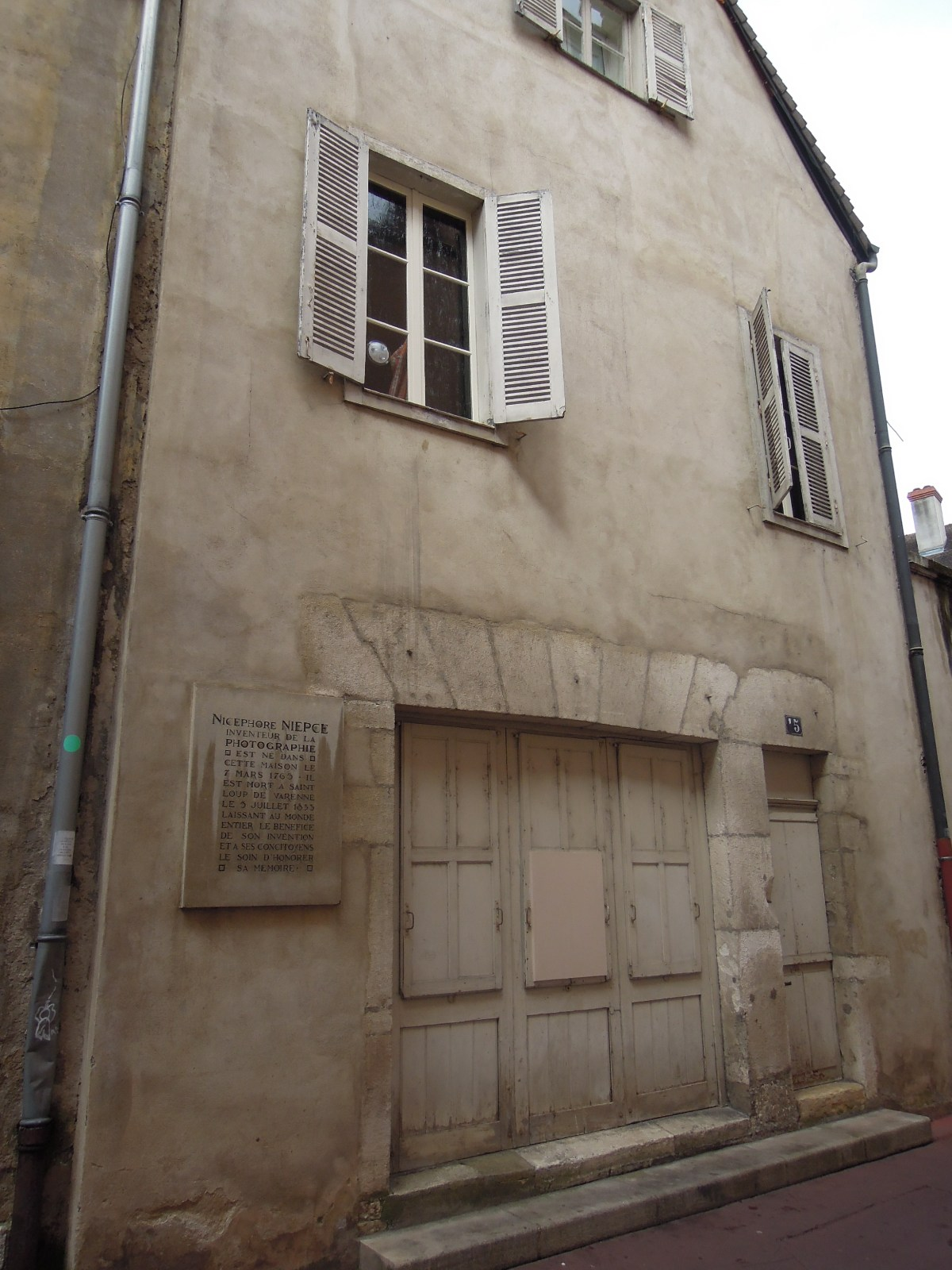
Niépce's birthplace at Chalon-sur-Saône, with a plaque in his memory

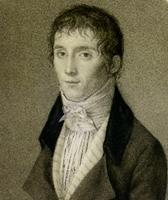
Niépce c. 1795

Niépce was born in Chalon-sur-Saône, Saône-et-Loire, where his father was a wealthy lawyer. His older brother Claude (1763–1828) was also his collaborator in research and invention, but died half-mad and destitute in England, having squandered the family wealth in pursuit of non-opportunities for the Pyréolophore. Niépce also had a sister and a younger brother, Bernard.

Nicéphore was baptized Joseph but adopted the name Nicéphore, in honour of Saint Nicephorus the ninth-century Patriarch of Constantinople, while studying at the Oratorian college in Angers. At the college he learned science and the experimental method, rapidly achieving success and graduating to work as a professor of the college.

=== Military career ===
Niépce served as a staff officer in the French army led by Napoleon, spending years in Italy and on the island of Sardinia, but ill health forced him to resign, whereupon he married Agnes Romero and became the Administrator of the district of Nice in post-revolutionary France. In 1795, he resigned as administrator of Nice to pursue scientific research with his brother Claude. One source reports his resignation to have been forced due to his unpopularity.

=== Scientific research ===
In 1801 the brothers returned to the family's estates in Chalon to continue their scientific research, and where they were united with their mother, their sister and their younger brother Bernard. Here they managed the family estate as independently wealthy gentlemen-farmers, raising beets and producing sugar.

=== Claude Niépce ===
In 1827 Niépce journeyed to England to visit his seriously ill elder brother Claude Niépce, who was now living in Kew, near London. Claude had descended into delirium and squandered much of the family fortune chasing inappropriate business opportunities for the Pyréolophore.

=== Death ===
Nicéphore Niépce died of a stroke on 5 July 1833, his death recorded on 6 July 1833, financially ruined such that his grave in the cemetery of Saint-Loup de Varennes was financed by the municipality. The cemetery is near the family house where he had experimented and had made the world's oldest surviving photographic image.

=== Descendants ===
His son Isidore (1805–1868) formed a partnership with Daguerre after his father's death and was granted a government pension in 1839 in return for disclosing the technical details of Nicéphore's heliogravure process.

A cousin, Claude Félix Abel Niépce de Saint-Victor (1805–1870), was a chemist and was the first to use albumen in photography. He also produced photographic engravings on steel. During 1857–1861, he discovered that uranium salts emit a form of radiation that is invisible to the human eye.

Photojournalist Janine Niépce (1921–2007) is a distant relative.

== Achievements ==
=== Photography ===
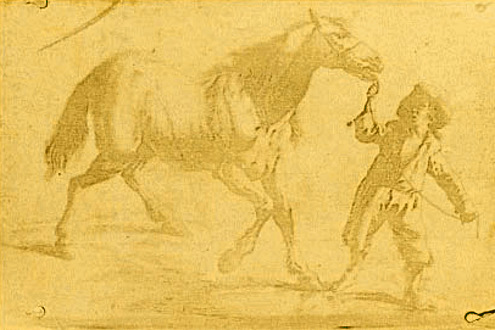
One of the three earliest known photographic artifacts, created by Nicéphore Niépce in 1825. It is an ink-on-paper print, but the printing plate used to make it was photographically created by Niépce's heliography process. It reproduces a 17th-century Flemish engraving.

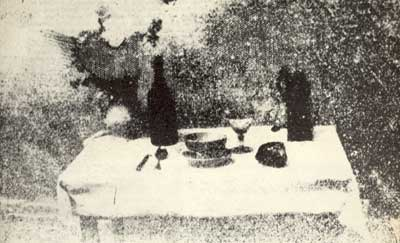
Still life of a set table, by Joseph Nicéphore Niépce, 1824–1833, the second earliest known camera photograph of which any visual record has survived. It is seen here in a late 19th century printed reproduction. The original, which was on glass, disappeared very early in the 20th century and is presumed to have been accidentally destroyed

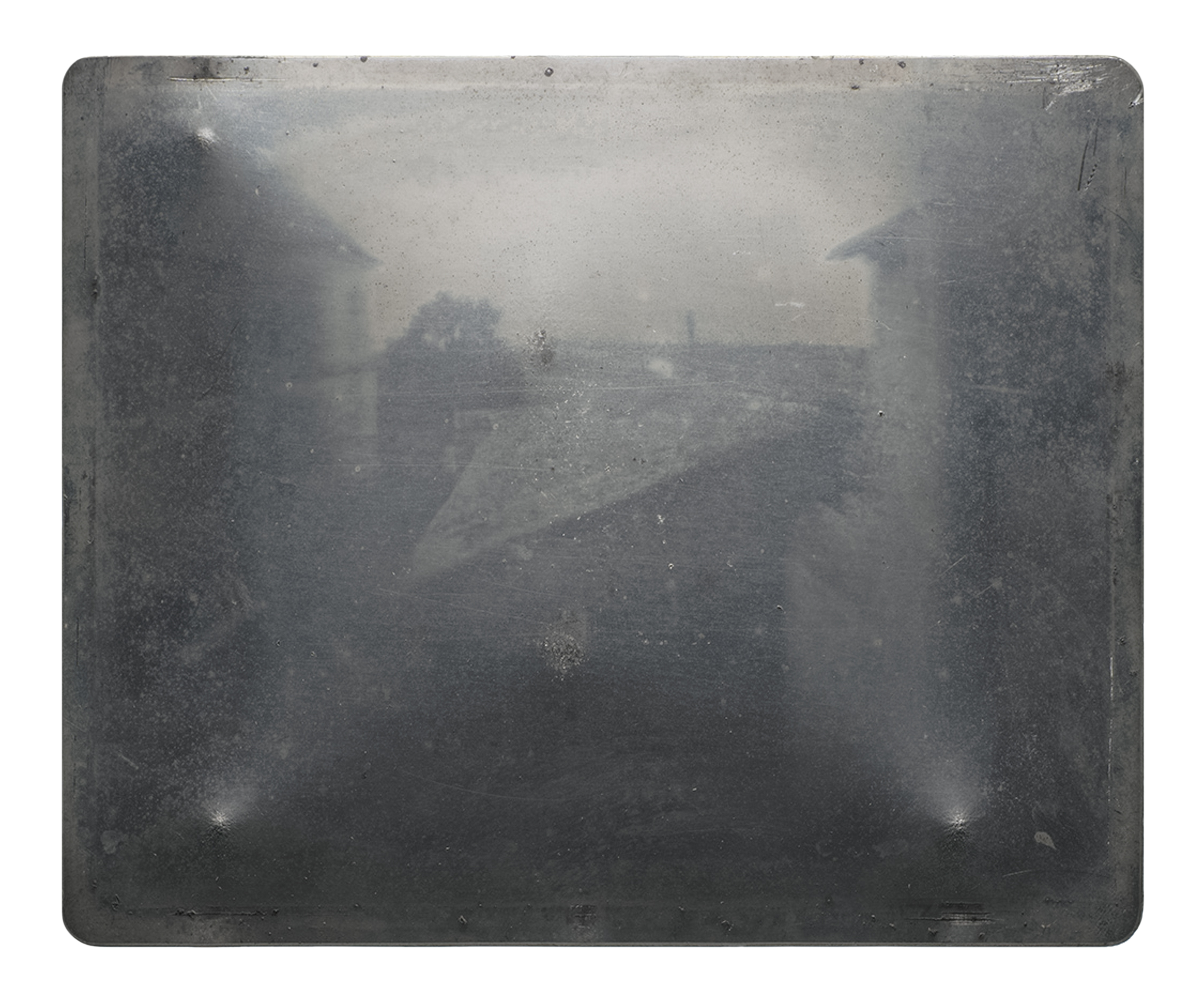
The earliest saved photographic image (Heliograph on pewter plate), taken sometime between 1822 and 1827 by Joseph Nicéphore Niépce, taken at Le Gras, France.

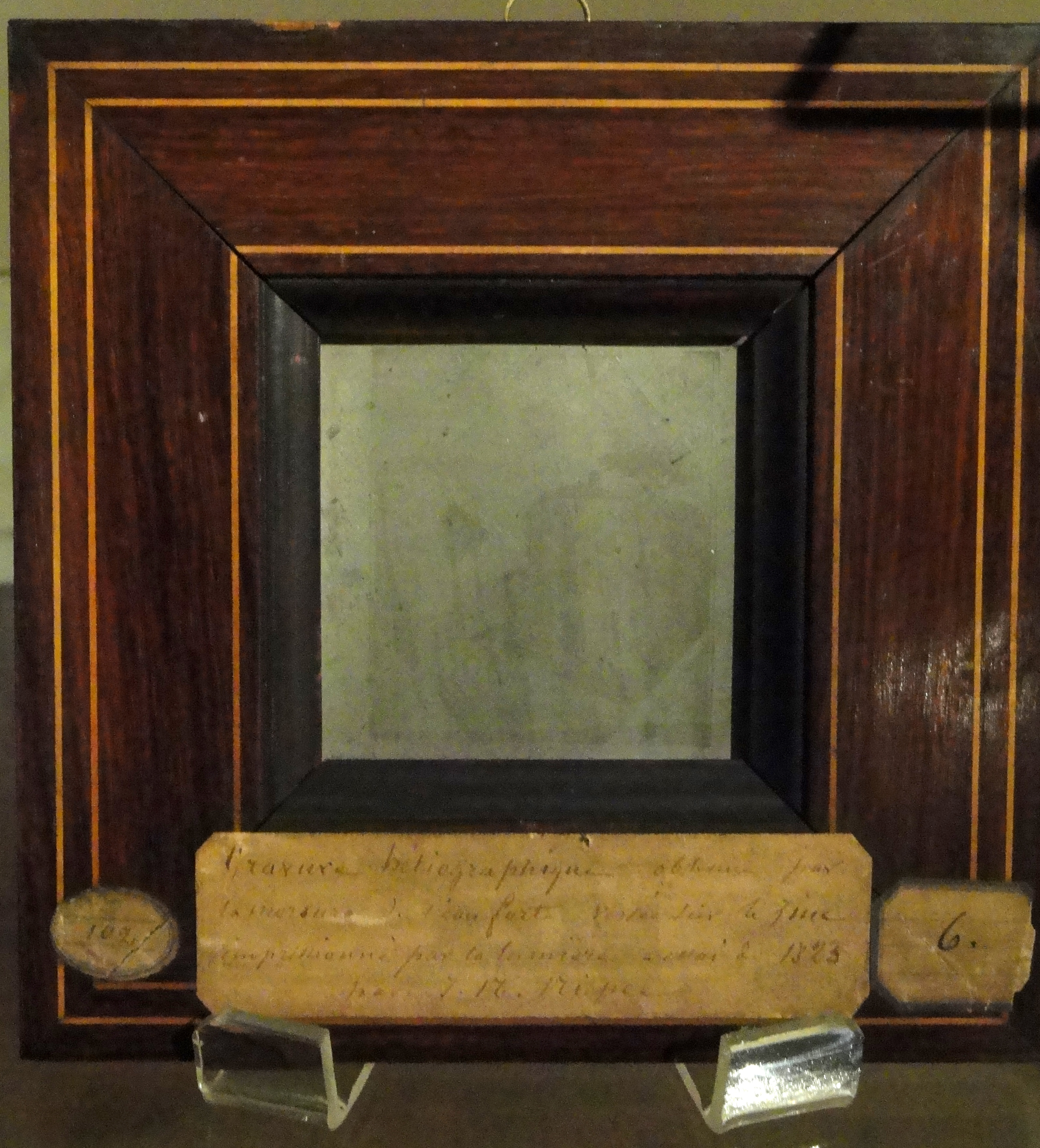
Heliograph on zinc, 1823, by Nicéphore Niépce - Paysage

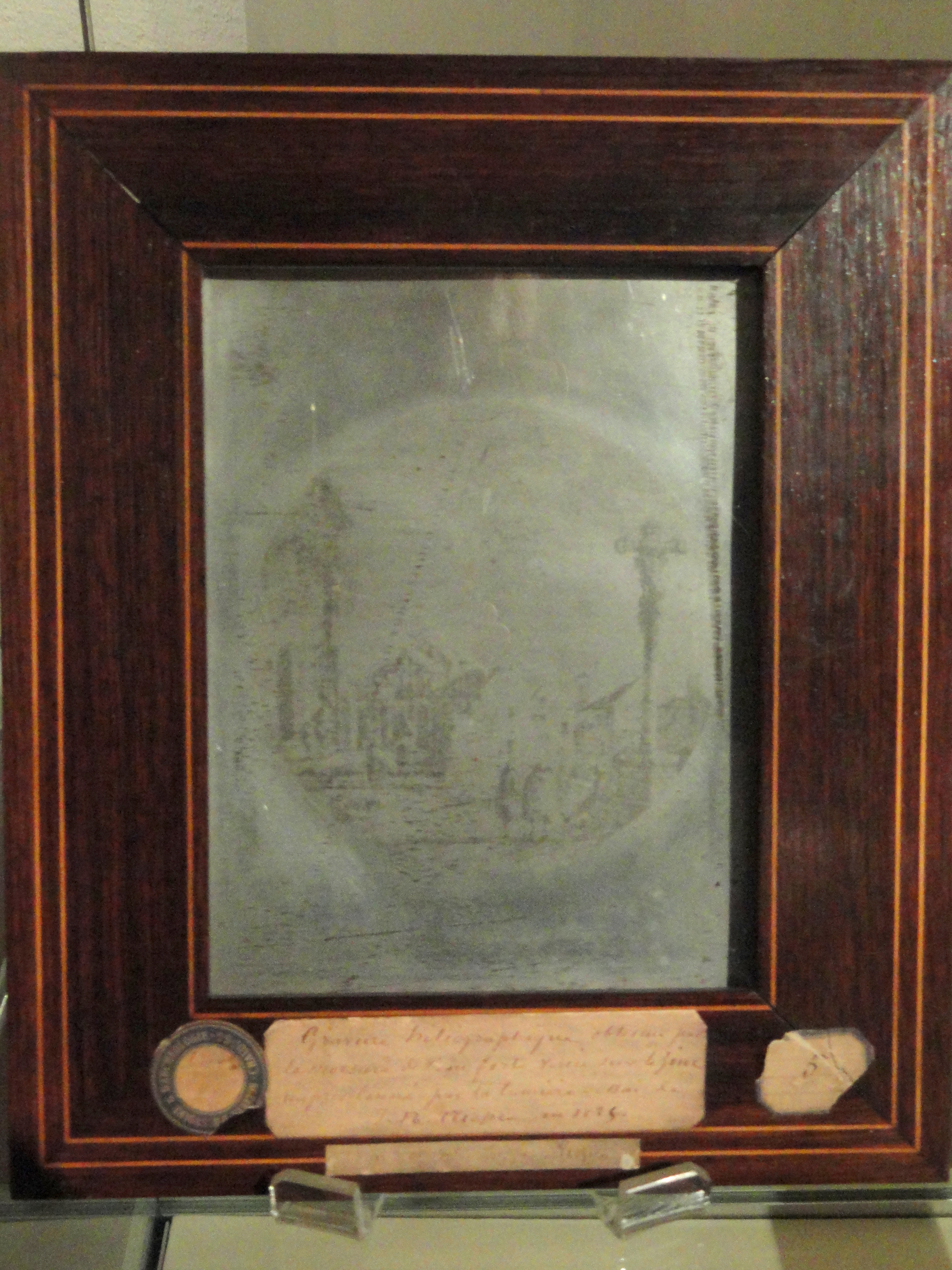
Heliograph on zinc, 1825, by Nicéphore Niépce - Paysage avec figures

The date of Niépce's first photographic experiments is uncertain. He was led to them by his interest in the new art of lithography, for which he realized he lacked the necessary skill and artistic ability, and by his acquaintance with the camera obscura, a drawing aid which was popular among affluent dilettantes in the late 18th and early 19th centuries. The camera obscura's beautiful but fleeting little "light paintings" inspired a number of people, including Thomas Wedgwood and Henry Fox Talbot, to seek some way of capturing them more easily and effectively than could be done by tracing over them with a pencil.

Letters to his sister-in-law around 1816 indicate that Niépce had managed to capture small camera images on paper coated with silver chloride, making him apparently the first to have any success at all in such an attempt, but the results were negatives, dark where they should be light and vice versa, and he could find no way to stop them from darkening all over when brought into the light for viewing.

Niépce turned his attention to other substances that were affected by light, eventually concentrating on Bitumen of Judea, a naturally occurring asphalt that had been used for various purposes since ancient times. In Niépce's time, it was used by artists as an acid-resistant coating on copper plates for making etchings. The artist scratched a drawing through the coating, then bathed the plate in acid to etch the exposed areas, then removed the coating with a solvent and used the plate to print ink copies of the drawing onto paper. What interested Niépce was the fact that the bitumen coating became less soluble after it had been left exposed to light.

Niépce dissolved bitumen in lavender oil, a solvent often used in varnishes, and thinly coated it onto a lithographic stone or a sheet of metal or glass. After the coating had dried, a test subject, typically an engraving printed on paper, was laid over the surface in close contact and the two were put out in direct sunlight. After sufficient exposure, the solvent could be used to rinse away only the unhardened bitumen that had been shielded from light by lines or dark areas in the test subject. The parts of the surface thus laid bare could then be etched with acid, or the remaining bitumen could serve as the water-repellent material in lithographic printing.

Niépce called his process heliography, which literally means "sun drawing". In 1822, he used it to create what is believed to have been the world's first permanent photographic image, a contact-exposed copy of an engraving of Pope Pius VII, but it was later destroyed when Niépce attempted to make prints from it. The earliest surviving photographic artifacts by Niépce, made in 1825, are copies of a 17th-century engraving of a man with a horse and of what may be an etching or engraving of a woman with a spinning wheel. They are simply sheets of plain paper printed with ink in a printing press, like ordinary etchings, engravings, or lithographs, but the plates used to print them were created photographically by Niépce's process rather than by laborious and inexact hand-engraving or drawing on lithographic stones. They thus are photo-etchings. One example of the print of the man with a horse and two examples of the print of the woman with the spinning wheel are known to have survived. The former is in the collection of the Bibliothèque nationale de France in Paris and the latter two are in a private collection in Westport, Connecticut.

Niépce's correspondence with his brother Claude has preserved the fact that his first real success in using bitumen to create a permanent photograph of the image in a camera obscura came sometime between 1822 and 1827. The result is now the oldest known camera photograph still in existence. The historic image had seemingly been lost early in the 20th century, but photography historians Helmut and Alison Gernsheim succeeded in tracking it down in 1952. The exposure time required to make it is usually said to have been eight or nine hours, but that is a mid-20th century assumption based largely on the fact that the sun lights the buildings on opposite sides, as if from an arc across the sky, indicating an essentially day-long exposure. A later researcher who used Niépce's notes and historically correct materials to recreate his processes found that in fact several days of exposure in the camera were needed to adequately capture such an image on a bitumen-coated plate.

In 1829, Niépce entered into a partnership with Louis Daguerre, who was also seeking a means of creating permanent photographic images with a camera. Together, they developed the physautotype, an improved process that used lavender oil distillate as the photosensitive substance. The partnership lasted until Niépce's death in 1833, after which Daguerre continued to experiment, eventually working out a process that only superficially resembled Niépce's. He named it the "daguerréotype", after himself. In 1839 he managed to get the government of France to purchase his invention on behalf of the people of France. The French government agreed to award Daguerre a yearly stipend of 6,000 francs for the rest of his life, and to give the estate of Niépce 4,000 francs yearly. This arrangement rankled Niépce's son, who claimed Daguerre was reaping all the benefits of his father's work. In some ways, he was right—for many years, Niépce received little credit for his contribution. Later historians have reclaimed Niépce from relative obscurity, and it is now generally recognized that his "heliography" was the first successful example of what we now call "photography": the creation of a reasonably light-fast and permanent image by the action of light on a light-sensitive surface and subsequent processing.

Although initially ignored amid the excitement caused by the introduction of the daguerreotype, and far too insensitive to be practical for making photographs with a camera, the utility of Niépce's original process for its primary purpose was eventually realized. From the 1850s until well into the 20th century, a thin coating of bitumen was widely used as a slow but very effective and economical photoresist for making printing plates.

=== Pyréolophore ===
The Pyréolophore, one of the world's first internal combustion engines that was actually built, was invented and patented by the Niépce brothers in 1807. This engine ran on controlled dust explosions of lycopodium powder and was installed on a boat that ran on the river Saône. Ten years later, the brothers were the first in the world to make an engine work with a fuel injection system.

=== Vélocipède ===
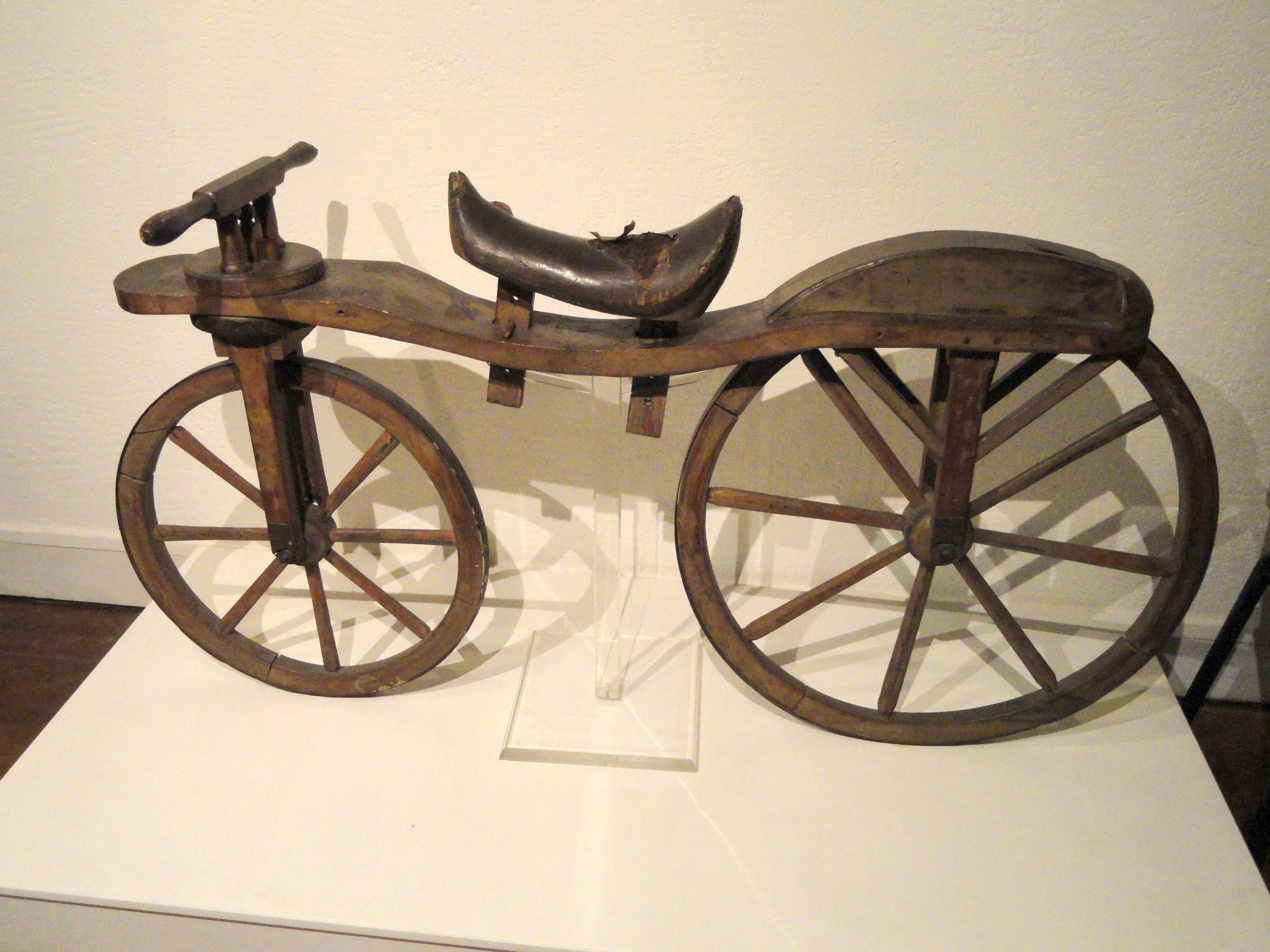
Draisienne built by Niépce, 1818 – Musée Nicéphore Niépce

In 1818 Niépce became interested in the ancestor of the bicycle, a Laufmaschine invented by Karl von Drais in 1817. He built himself a model and called it the vélocipède (fast foot) and caused quite a sensation on the local country roads. Niépce improved his machine with an adjustable saddle and it is now exhibited at the Niépce Museum. In a letter to his brother Nicéphore contemplated motorizing his machine.

=== Marly machine ===
In 1807 the imperial government opened a competition for a hydraulic machine to replace the original Marly machine (located in Marly-le-Roi) that delivered water to the Palace of Versailles from the Seine river. The machine was built in Bougival in 1684, from where it pumped water a distance of one kilometer and raised it 150 meters. The Niépce brothers conceived a new hydrostatic principle for the machine and improved it once more in 1809. The machine had undergone changes in many of its parts, including more precise pistons, creating far less resistance. They tested it many times, and the result was that with a stream drop of 4 feet 4 inches, it lifted water 11 feet. But in December 1809 they got a message that they had waited too long and the Emperor had taken on himself the decision to ask the engineer Périer (1742–1818) to build a steam engine to operate the pumps at Marly.

== Legacy and commemoration ==
The lunar crater Niépce is named after him, as is the minor planet (3117) Niépce.

The Niépce Heliograph is on permanent display at the Harry Ransom Center at the University of Texas at Austin. The object was located by historians Alison and Helmut Gernsheim in 1952 and sold to the Humanities Research Center (later renamed the Harry Ransom Center) in 1963.

The Niépce Prize has been awarded annually since 1955 to a professional photographer who has lived and worked in France for over three years. It was introduced in honour of Niépce by Albert Plécy of the l'Association Gens d'Images.

== See also ==
- Timeline of photography technology
- Timeline of transportation technology
- History of the internal combustion engine
- François Isaac de Rivaz
- List of works by Eugène Guillaume

== Sources ==
- Marignier, J. L., Niépce: l'invention de la photographie (1999)
- Bajac, Q., The Invention of Photography, trans. R. Taylor (2002)
