= Jacques-Constantin Périer =

18th–19th century French engineer and businessman

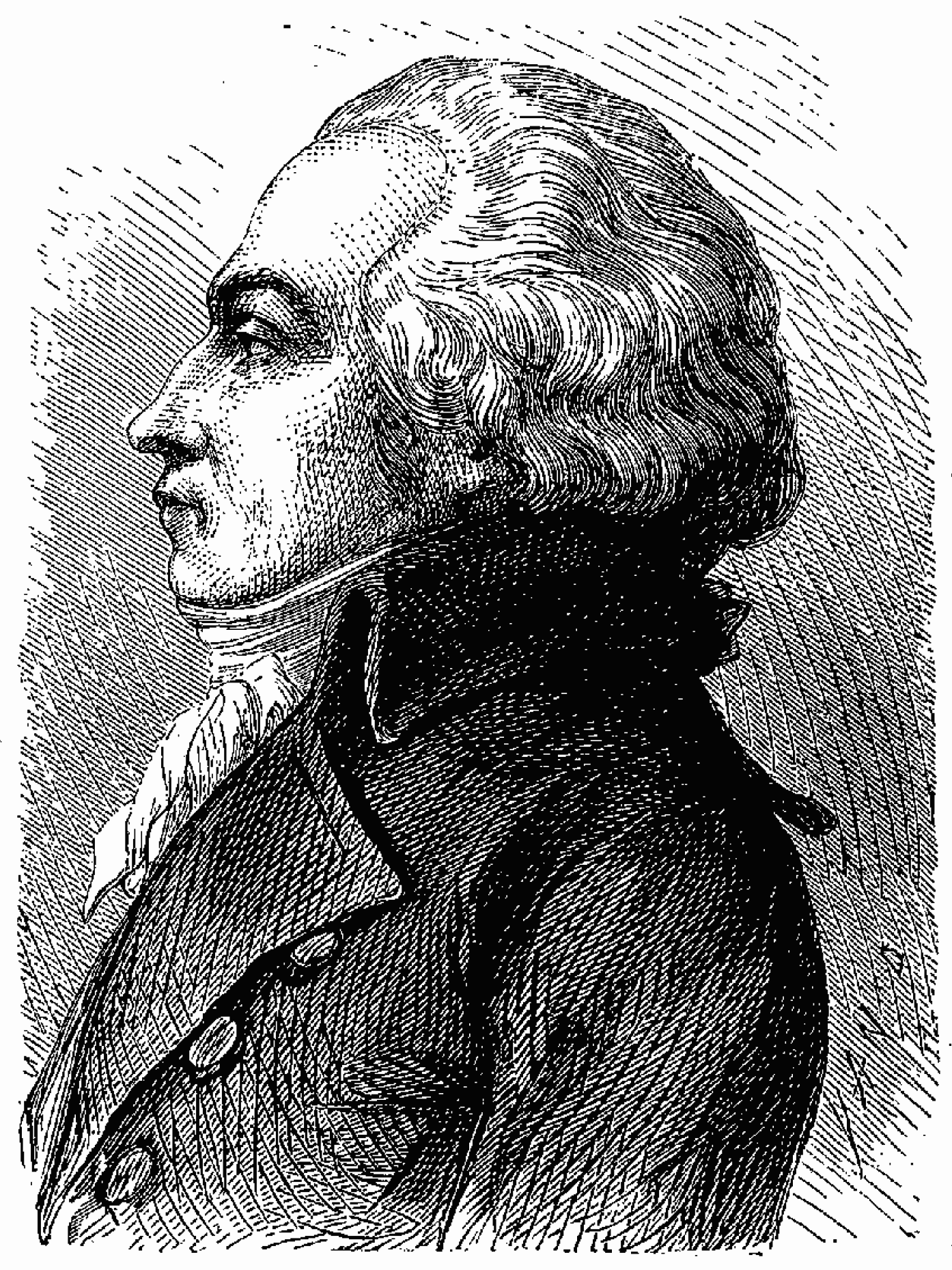
Jacques-Constantin Périer

Jacques-Constantin Périer (Paris, November 2, 1742 – 1818) was a self-taught French engineer and businessman who, with his brother, founded the Compagnie des eaux de Paris during a period of great stock market speculation under Louis XVI. He is known for having introduced James Watt's steam engine to France in 1779 and for having built the first double-acting engine in 1789, only six years after Watt thanks to the intercession of Agustín de Betancourt during a visit to Watt's Albion Mills.

== Early life ==
Périer's father Joseph-Constantin Périer was Receiver general of the domains and woods of the district of Alençon. His first invention was a centrifugal pump, under a patent granted by the Duke of Chartres and the Duke of Orleans.

== Paris water supply ==
With his brother Auguste Charles, also a businessman, Périer was granted Royal letters patent to erect steam engines to pump water from the Seine and install a network of pipes for distributing it to customers, as was being done in London. He obtained the concession on 7 February 1777 and founded the ‘Compagnie des Eaux a Paris’ on 27 Aug. 1778.

In 1779, James Watt granted them rights to machines of his invention, providing the plans. Despite obstacles to freighting orders to France given the war-time controls on trade and a growing shortage of shipping, as well as growing distrust of Périer by Watt and his partners, suppliers of iron pipes, brothers William and John Wilkinson, the Chaillot pumps "the Constantine" and "the Augustine" were in operation from 8 August 1781 and included components supplied by Boulton & Watt shipped on the brigantine Mary. The pumps near the Place de l'Alma sent water uphill to be stored in the four Passy reservoirs near the hill of Chaillot, from which the water flowed to the Périer company's private subscribers, and also to seven new public fountains. The installation operated until 1900.

Watt in 1778 held rights to the marketing of his machine in France, though they were ignored by Périer, who also sold it. For this, in 1786, Watt was compensated with the amount of 51,600 livres. Later, in his defence, Périer wrote in 1810: “I am not the inventor of steam engines. But I am the creator of this branch of industry in France.”

Fired from the company, the Périer brothers sued for the return of 300 shares and obtained financial compensation of 1,200,000 livres. Difficulties in the execution of this judgment arose due to the French Revolution and they addressed a petition to the National Assembly, read in public session of November 24, 1790 and it was returned to committee.

Jacques Constantin Périer is also associated with Nicolas Bettinger and with him invested in the Indret gun foundry, downstream from Nantes.

Périer responded to the imperial government's public competition in 1807 to replace the pump at Bougival, on the Seine river, used to deliver water to the Palace of Versailles pumped to an elevation of one kilometre.. His proposal for a steam pump was accepted, beating a proposal by Claude Niépce and was subsequently built in 1809.

== Littry winding engines ==
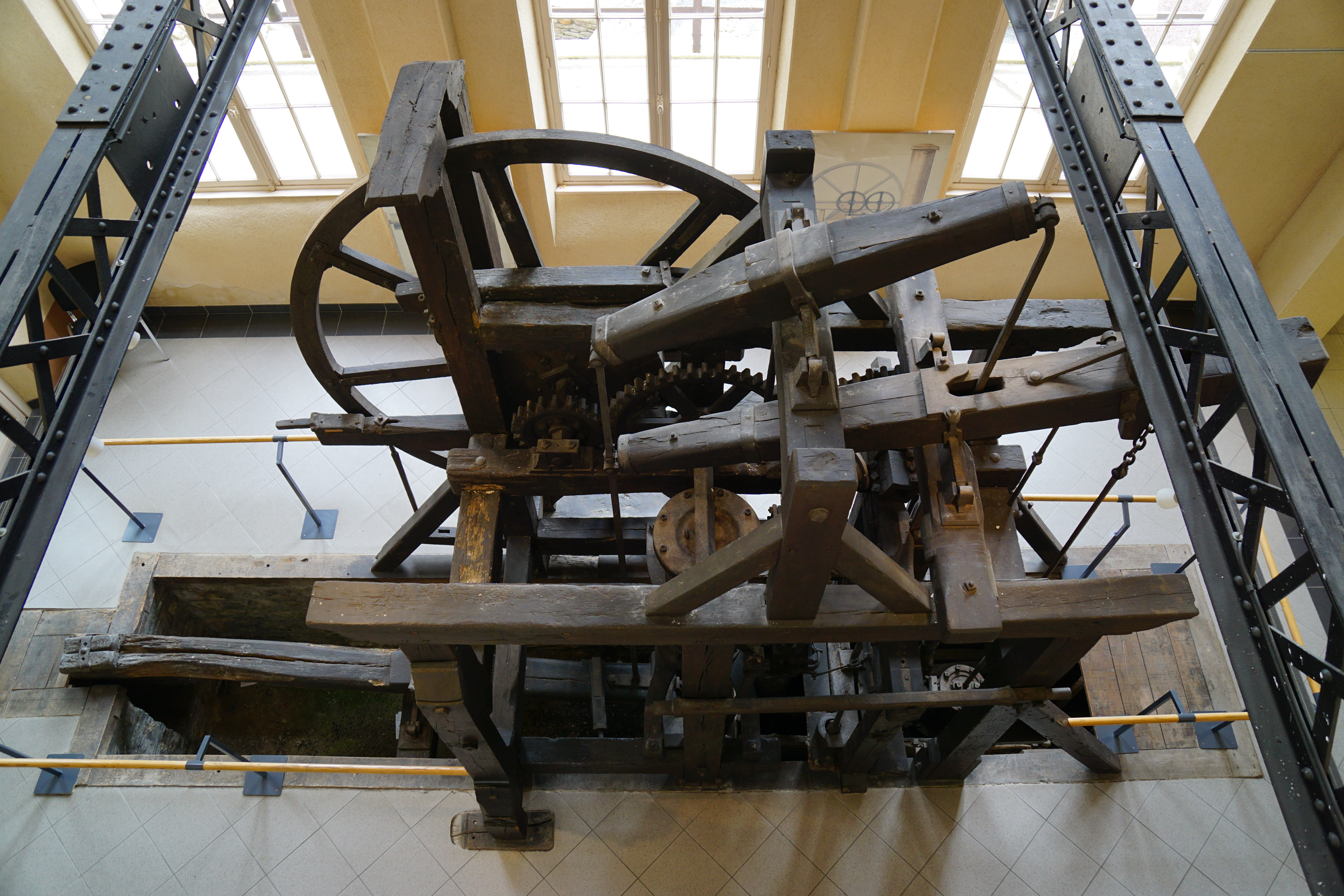
Littry winding machine

In 1802 the Périer brothers manufactured steam winding engines, supplying the Anzin Company with twenty of the machines for winding and drainage at several pits in the Littry coal mines. One of them is kept at the Molay-Littry mine museum and is the oldest steam engine preserved in France.

== Legacy ==
Rue des Frères-Périer is located on the site of Périer's original pump, in Chaillot, now the 16th arrondissement.

== Publications ==
- Périer, Jacques Constantin (1800) Brevet D'invention ... Machine À Vapeur Propre À Monter Le Charbon Des Mines. Certificat De Demande D'un Brevet D'invention Délivré En Vertu De L'arrêté Des Consuls Du 5 Vendémiaire an 9 Au Citoyen J.C. Périer Domicilié Etc.
- Périer, Jacques Constantin (1810). Sur les machines à vapeur par Jacques-Constantin Périer (in French). Paris: Impr. de Porthmann. OCLC 800804735.
- Périer, Jacques-Constantin (1777). Distribution d'eau de la Seine : dans tous les quartiers et dans toutes les maisons de Paris. Paris: La veuve Ballard. OCLC 65331137.
