= Bitumen of Judea =

Type of naturally occurring asphalt

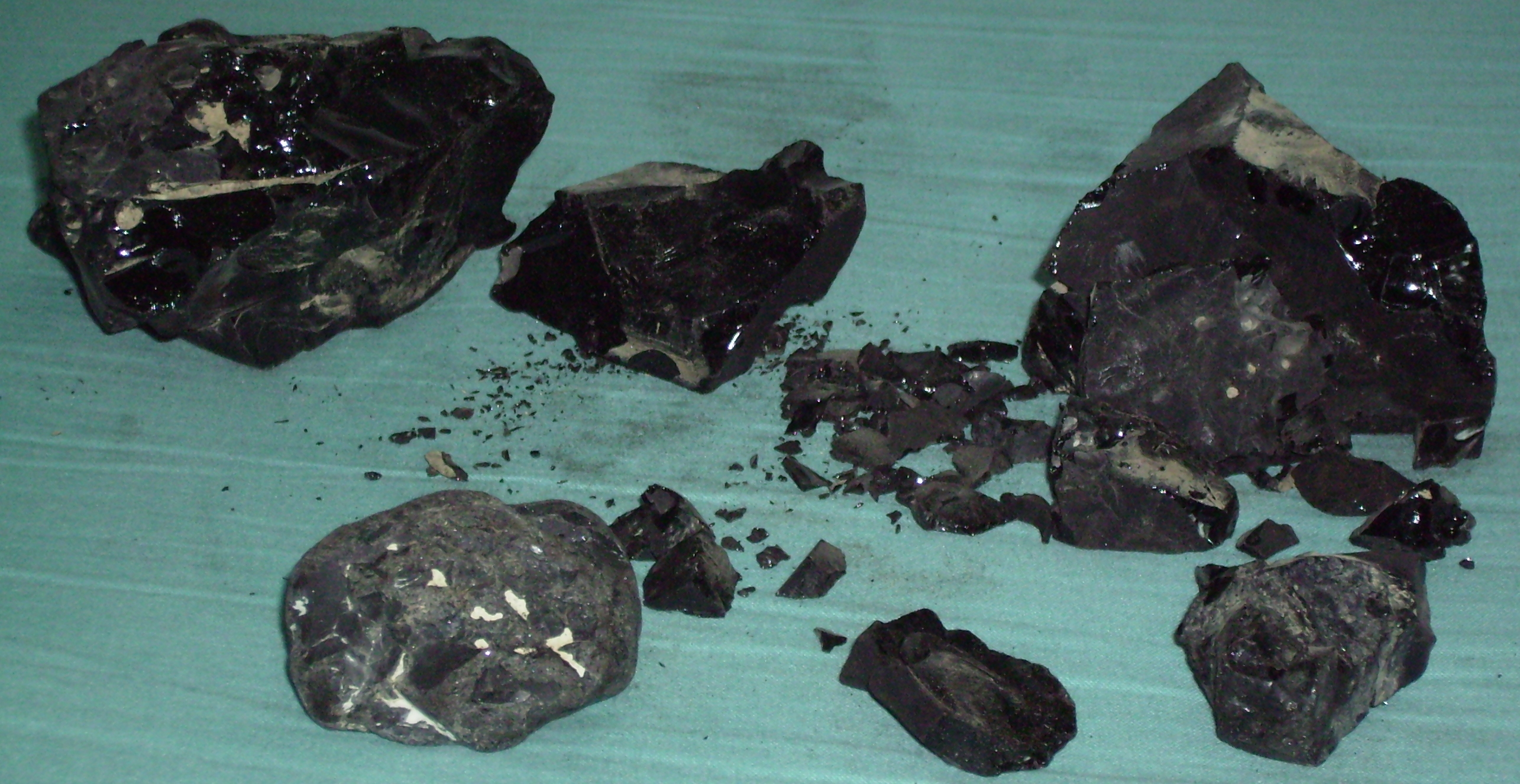
Natural bitumen from the Dead Sea

Bitumen of Judea is a naturally occurring asphalt used since antiquity as a coloring agent for wood, and in early photography as a light-sensitive coating.

== Wood coloration usage ==
Bitumen of Judea may be used as a colorant for wood for an aged, natural and rustic appearance. It is soluble in turpentine and some other terpenes, and can be combined with oils, waxes, varnishes and glazes.

== Light-sensitive properties ==
It is a light-sensitive material in what is accepted to be the first complete photographic process, i.e., one capable of producing durable light-fast results. The technique was developed by French scientist and inventor Nicéphore Niépce in the 1820s. In 1826 or 1827, he applied a thin coating of the tar-like material to a pewter plate and took a picture of the buildings and surrounding countryside of his estate, producing what is usually described as the first photograph. It is considered to be the oldest known surviving photograph made in a camera. The plate was exposed in the camera for at least eight hours.

The bitumen, initially soluble in spirits and oils, was hardened and made insoluble (probably polymerized) in the brightest areas of the image. The unhardened part was then rinsed away with a solvent.

Niépce's primary objective was not a photoengraving or photolithography process, but rather a photo-etching process, since engraving requires the intervention of a physical rather than chemical process and lithography involves a grease and water resistance process. However, Niépce's famous image of Pope Pius VI was produced first by photo-etching and then improved by hand engraving. Bitumen, superbly resistant to strong acids, was in fact later widely used as a photoresist in making printing plates for mechanical printing processes. The surface of a zinc or other metal plate was coated, exposed, developed with a solvent that laid bare the unexposed areas, then etched in an acid bath, producing the required surface relief.

== See also ==
- Heliography
