= Rodenstock =

Rodenstock may refer to:

Companies

- Rodenstock GmbH, a German manufacturer of ophthalmic lenses and frames.
- Rodenstock Photo Optics, a photographic brand by Excelitas Technologies (formerly owned by LINOS Photonics, 2000–06, and Qioptiq Group, 2006–13)

Individuals

- Hardy Rodenstock (1941–2018), pseudonym for Meinhard Görke, a German wine collector
- Josef Rodenstock (1846–1932), German entrepreneur
- Alexander Rodenstock (1883–1953), German entrepreneur and economic functionary
- Rolf Rodenstock (1917–1997), German economist and economic functionary
- Randolf Rodenstock (* 1948), German entrepreneur and economic functionary
