= Bernd Längin =

Bernd G. Längin
- Born: 1941; Karlsruhe, Germany
- Died: 2008 (aged 66–67); Winnipeg/Manitoba
- Occupation: Journalist
- Writing career
- Notable works: Die Amischen: vom Geheimnis des einfachen Lebens; Deutschen Kolonien: Schauplätze und Schicksale 1884–1918

Bernd G. Längin (1941–2008) was a journalist and author of multiple books. In addition, he worked as Chief Editor of GLOBUS, published by Verein für Deutsche Kulturbeziehungen im Ausland (VDA).

== Bibliography ==
- Die Russlanddeutschen unter Doppeladler und Sowjetstern: Städte, Landschaften und Menschen auf alten Fotos. Augsburg, Weltbild 1991.

In English: The Russian Germans under the Double Eagle and the Soviet Star: Including a Pictorial History of Cities, Landscapes and People, Design and Printing in the United States of America by the Germans from Russia Heritage Collection North Dakota State University Libraries, Fargo, 2013, ISBN 1-891193-76-7

- Deutschen Kolonien: Schauplätze und Schicksale 1884–1918. Hamburg: Mittler, 2004.
- Die Amischen: vom Geheimnis des einfachen Lebens. [München?], 1990
