= History of the camera =

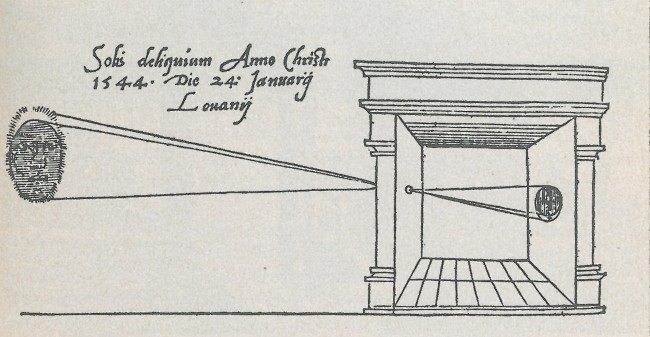
First published picture of a camera obscura in Gemma Frisius' 1545 book De Radio Astronomica et Geometrica

The history of the camera began even before the introduction of photography. Cameras evolved from the camera obscura through many generations of photographic technology – daguerreotypes, calotypes, dry plates, film – to the modern day with digital cameras and camera phones.

== Camera obscura (pre-17th century) ==
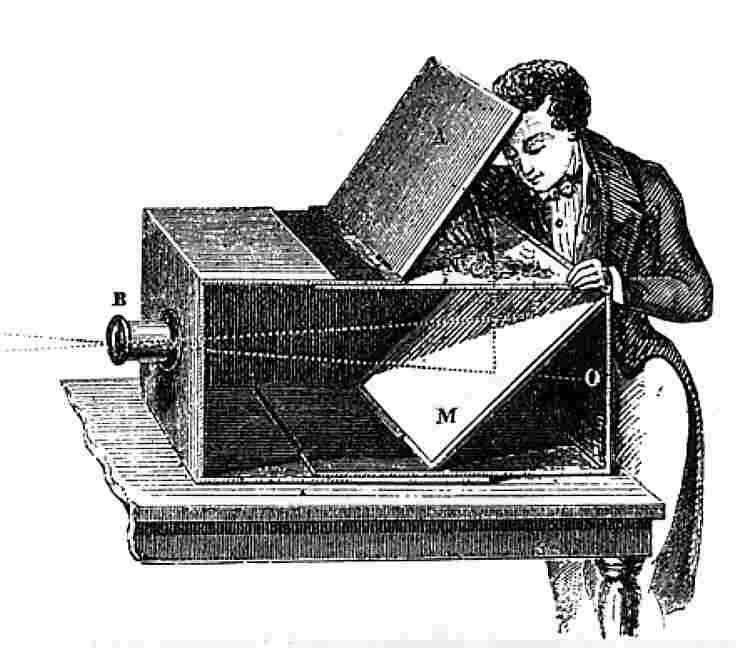
An 18th-century artist utilizing a camera obscura for image tracing

The camera obscura (from the Latin for 'dark room') is a natural optical phenomenon and precursor of the photographic camera. It projects an inverted image (flipped left to right and upside down) of a scene from the other side of a screen or wall through a small aperture onto a surface opposite the opening. The earliest documented explanation of this principle comes from Chinese philosopher Mozi (c. 470 – c. 391 BC), who correctly argued that the inversion of the camera obscura image is a result of light traveling in straight lines from its source.

From around 1550, lenses were used in the openings of walls or closed window shutters in dark rooms to project images, aiding in drawing. By the late 17th century, portable camera obscura devices in tents and boxes had come into use as drawing tools.

The images produced by these early cameras could only be preserved by manually tracing them, as no photographic processes had been invented yet. The first cameras were large enough to accommodate one or more people, and over time they evolved into increasingly compact models. By the time of Niépce, portable box camera obscurae suitable for photography were widely available. Johann Zahn envisioned the first camera small and portable enough for practical photography in 1685, but it took nearly 150 years for such an application to become possible.

With a pinhole camera, light enters a dark box through a small hole, and projects an inverted image on the wall opposite the hole.

Ibn al-Haytham (c. 965 – 1040), an Arab physicist also known as Alhazen, made significant contributions to the understanding of the camera obscura, conducting experiments with light in a darkened room with a small opening. He is often credited with the invention of the pinhole camera. He also provided the first correct analysis of the camera obscura, offering the first geometrical and quantitative descriptions of the phenomenon, and was the first to utilize a screen in a dark room for image projection from a hole in the surface. He was the first to understand the relationship between the focal point and the pinhole, and was the pioneer of early afterimage experiments.

The work of Ibn al-Haytham on optics, circulated through Latin translations, played a significant role in inspiring notable individuals such as Witelo, John Peckham, Roger Bacon, Leonardo da Vinci, René Descartes, and Johannes Kepler. The Camera Obscura was used as a drawing aid since at least around 1550. By the late 17th century, portable versions of the device housed in tents and boxes became commonly used for drawing purposes.

== Early photographic camera (18th–19th centuries) ==
Before the development of the photography camera, it had been known for hundreds of years that some substances, such as silver salts, darkened when exposed to sunlight. In a series of experiments published in 1727, the German scientist Johann Heinrich Schulze demonstrated that the darkening of the salts was due to light alone, and not influenced by heat or exposure to air.The Swedish chemist Carl Wilhelm Scheele showed in 1777 that silver chloride was especially susceptible to darkening from light exposure, and that once darkened, it becomes insoluble in an ammonia solution. The first person to use this chemistry to create images was Thomas Wedgwood. To create images, Wedgwood placed items, such as leaves and insect wings, on ceramic pots coated with silver nitrate, and exposed the set-up to light. These images weren't permanent, however, as Wedgwood didn't employ a fixing mechanism. He ultimately failed at his goal of using the process to create fixed images created by a camera obscura.

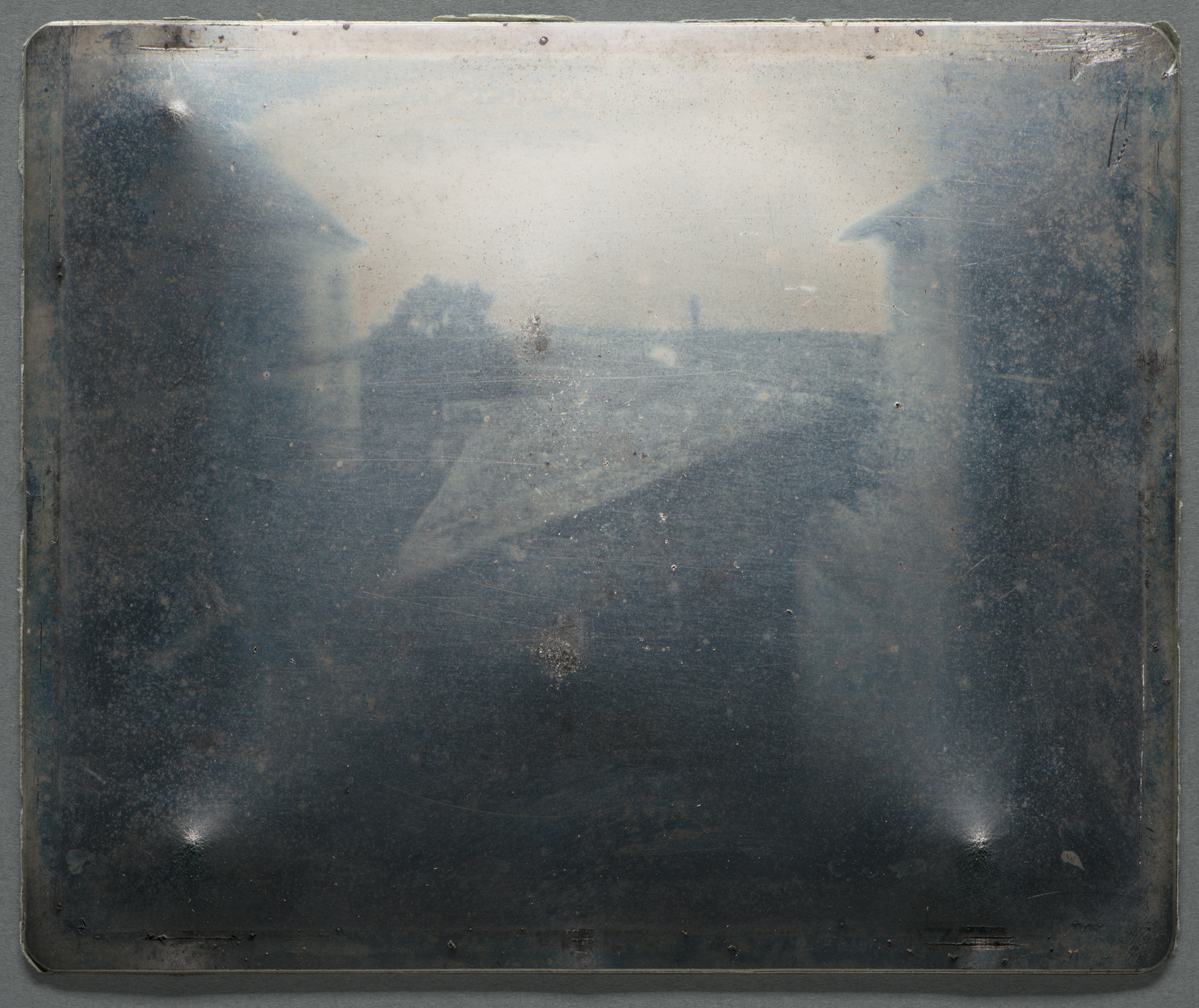
View from the Window at Le Gras (1826), the earliest surviving photograph

The first permanent photograph of a camera image was made in 1826 by Nicéphore Niépce using a sliding wooden box camera made by Charles and Vincent Chevalier in Paris. Niépce had been experimenting with ways to fix the images of a camera obscura since 1816. The photograph Niépce succeeded in creating shows the view from his window. It was made using an 8-hour exposure on pewter coated with bitumen. Niépce called his process "heliography". Niépce corresponded with the inventor Louis Daguerre, and the pair entered into a partnership to improve the heliographic process. Niépce had experimented further with other chemicals, to improve contrast in his heliographs. Daguerre contributed an improved camera obscura design, but the partnership ended when Niépce died in 1833. Daguerre succeeded in developing a high-contrast and extremely sharp image by exposing on a plate coated with silver iodide, and exposing this plate again to mercury vapor. By 1837, he was able to fix the images with a common salt solution. He called this process Daguerreotype, and tried unsuccessfully for a couple of years to commercialize it. Eventually, with help of the scientist and politician François Arago, the French government acquired Daguerre's process for public release. In exchange, pensions were provided to Daguerre as well as Niépce's son, Isidore.

In the 1830s, the English scientist William Henry Fox Talbot independently invented a process to capture camera images using silver salts. Although dismayed that Daguerre had beaten him to the announcement of photography, he submitted a pamphlet to the Royal Institution entitled Some Account of the Art of Photogenic Drawing on 31 Jan 1839, which was the first published description of photography. Within two years, Talbot developed a two-step process for creating photographs on paper, which he called calotypes. The calotype process was the first to utilize negative printing, which reverses all values in the reproduction process – black shows up as white and vice versa. Negative printing allows, in principle, an unlimited number of positive prints to be made from the original negative. The Calotype process also introduced the ability for a printmaker to alter the resulting image through retouching of the negative.Calotypes were never as popular or widespread as daguerreotypes, owing mainly to the fact that the latter produced sharper details. However, because daguerreotypes only produce a direct positive print, no duplicates can be made. It is the two-step negative/positive process that formed the basis for modern photography.

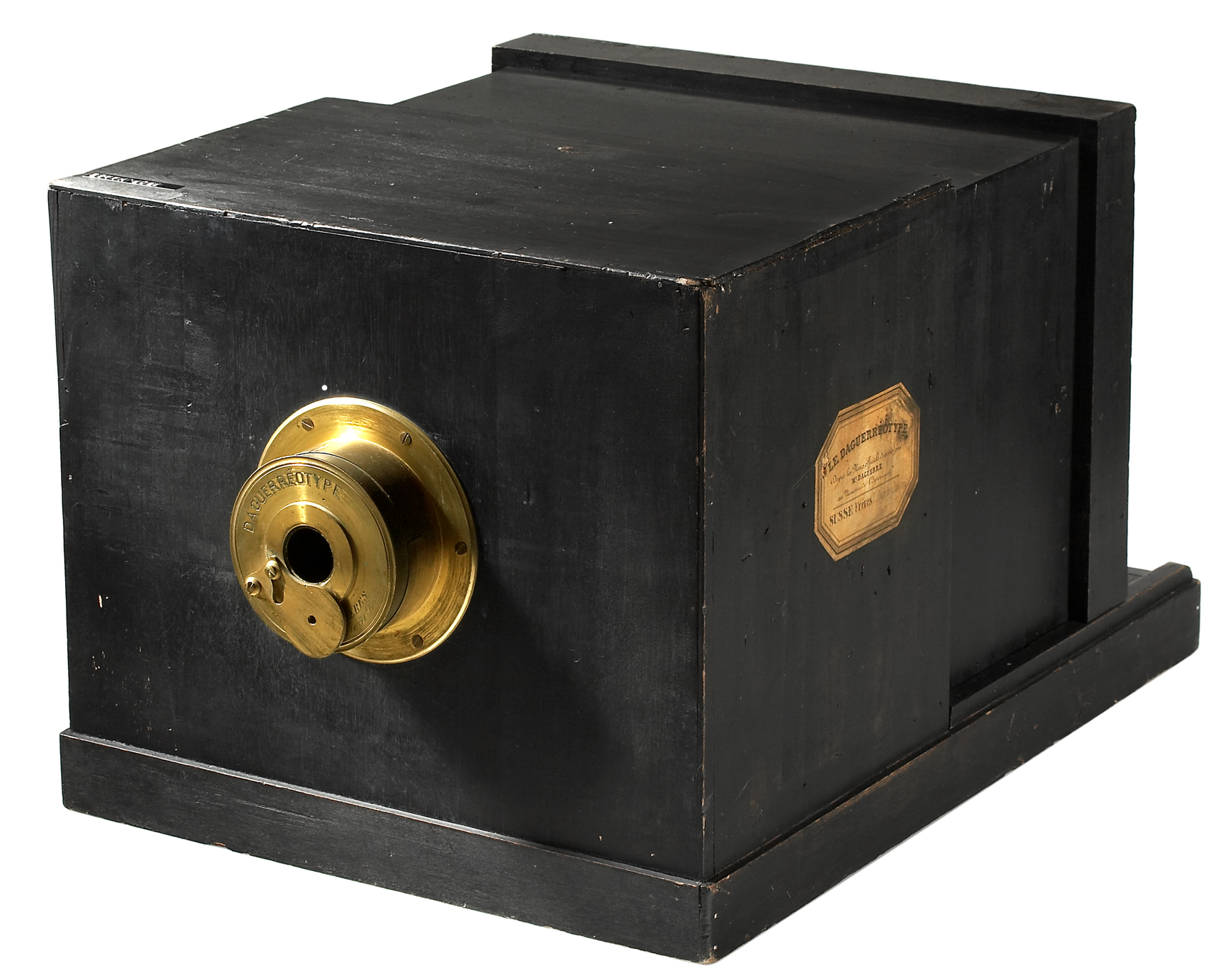
The Giroux daguerreotype camera made by Maison Susse Frères in 1839, with a lens by Charles Chevalier, the first to be commercially produced

The first photographic camera developed for commercial manufacture was a daguerreotype camera, built by Alphonse Giroux in 1839. Giroux signed a contract with Daguerre and Isidore Niépce to produce the cameras in France, with each device and accessories costing 400 francs. The camera was a double-box design, with a landscape lens fitted to the outer box, and a holder for a ground glass focusing screen and image plate on the inner box. By sliding the inner box, objects at various distances could be brought to as sharp a focus as desired. After a satisfactory image had been focused on the screen, the screen was replaced with a sensitized plate. A knurled wheel controlled a copper flap in front of the lens, which functioned as a shutter. The early daguerreotype cameras required long exposure times, which in 1839 could be from 5 to 30 minutes.

After the introduction of the Giroux daguerreotype camera, other manufacturers quickly produced improved variations. Charles Chevalier, who had earlier provided Niépce with lenses, created in 1841 a double-box camera using a half-sized plate for imaging. Chevalier's camera had a hinged bed, allowing for half of the bed to fold onto the back of the nested box. In addition to having increased portability, the camera had a faster lens, bringing exposure times down to 3 minutes, and a prism at the front of the lens, which allowed the image to be laterally correct. Another French design emerged in 1841, created by Marc Antoine Gaudin. The Nouvel Appareil Gaudin camera had a metal disc with three differently-sized holes mounted on the front of the lens. Rotating to a different hole effectively provided variable f-stops, allowing different amounts of light into the camera. Instead of using nested boxes to focus, the Gaudin camera used nested brass tubes. In Germany, Peter Friedrich Voigtländer designed an all-metal camera with a conical shape that produced circular pictures of about 3 inches in diameter. The distinguishing characteristic of the Voigtländer camera was its use of a lens designed by Joseph Petzval. The f/3.5 Petzval lens was nearly 30 times faster than any other lens of the period, and was the first to be made specifically for portraiture. Its design was the most widely used for portraits until Carl Zeiss introduced the anastigmat lens in 1889.

Within a decade of being introduced in America, 3 general forms of camera were in popular use: the American- or chamfered-box camera, the Robert's-type camera or "Boston box", and the Lewis-type camera. The American-box camera had beveled edges at the front and rear, and an opening in the rear where the formed image could be viewed on ground glass. The top of the camera had hinged doors for placing photographic plates. Inside there was one available slot for distant objects, and another slot in the back for close-ups. The lens was focused either by sliding or with a rack and pinion mechanism. The Robert's-type cameras were similar to the American-box, except for having a knob-fronted worm gear on the front of the camera, which moved the back box for focusing. Many Robert's-type cameras allowed focusing directly on the lens mount. The third popular daguerreotype camera in America was the Lewis-type, introduced in 1851, which utilized a bellows for focusing. The main body of the Lewis-type camera was mounted on the front box, but the rear section was slotted into the bed for easy sliding. Once focused, a set screw was tightened to hold the rear section in place. Having the bellows in the middle of the body facilitated making a second, in-camera copy of the original image.

Daguerreotype cameras formed images on silvered copper plates and images were only able to develop with mercury vapor. The earliest daguerreotype cameras required several minutes to half an hour to expose images on the plates. By 1840, exposure times were reduced to just a few seconds owing to improvements in the chemical preparation and development processes, and to advances in lens design. American daguerreotypists introduced manufactured plates in mass production, and plate sizes became internationally standardized: whole plate (6.5 × 8.5 inches), three-quarter plate (5.5 × 7 1/8 inches), half plate (4.5 × 5.5 inches), quarter plate (3.25 × 4.25 inches), sixth plate (2.75 × 3.25 inches), and ninth plate (2 × 2.5 inches). Plates were often cut to fit cases and jewelry with circular and oval shapes. Larger plates were produced, with sizes such as 9 × 13 inches ("double-whole" plate), or 13.5 × 16.5 inches (Southworth & Hawes' plate).

The collodion wet plate process that gradually replaced the daguerreotype during the 1850s required photographers to coat and sensitize thin glass or iron plates shortly before use and expose them in the camera while still wet. Early wet plate cameras were very simple and little different from Daguerreotype cameras, but more sophisticated designs eventually appeared. The Dubroni of 1864 allowed the sensitizing and developing of the plates to be carried out inside the camera itself rather than in a separate darkroom. Other cameras were fitted with multiple lenses for photographing several small portraits on a single larger plate, useful when making cartes de visite. It was during the wet plate era that the use of bellows for focusing became widespread, making the bulkier and less easily adjusted nested box design obsolete.

For many years, exposure times were long enough that the photographer simply removed the lens cap, counted off the number of seconds (or minutes) estimated to be required by the lighting conditions, then replaced the cap. As more sensitive photographic materials became available, cameras began to incorporate mechanical shutter mechanisms that allowed very short and accurately timed exposures to be made.

The use of photographic film was pioneered by George Eastman, who started manufacturing paper film in 1885 before switching to celluloid in 1889. His first camera, which he called the "Kodak", was first offered for sale in 1888. It was a very simple box camera with a fixed-focus lens and single shutter speed, which along with its relatively low price appealed to the average consumer. The Kodak came pre-loaded with enough film for 100 exposures and needed to be sent back to the factory for processing and reloading when the roll was finished. By the end of the 19th century Eastman had expanded his lineup to several models including both box and folding cameras.

Films also made possible capture of motion (cinematography) establishing the movie industry by the end of the 19th century.

== Early fixed images ==
The first partially successful photograph of a camera image was made in approximately 1816 by Nicéphore Niépce, using a very small camera of his own making and a piece of paper coated with silver chloride, which darkened where it was exposed to light. No means of removing the remaining unaffected silver chloride was known to Niépce, so the photograph was not permanent, eventually becoming entirely darkened by the overall exposure to light necessary for viewing it. In the mid-1820s, Niépce used a wooden box camera made by Parisian opticians Charles and Vincent Chevalier, to experiment with photography on surfaces thinly coated with Bitumen of Judea. The bitumen slowly hardened in the brightest areas of the image. The unhardened bitumen was then dissolved away. One of those photographs has survived.

== Daguerreotypes and calotypes ==
After Niépce's death in 1833, his partner Louis Daguerre continued to experiment and by 1837 had created the first practical photographic process, which he named the daguerreotype and publicly unveiled in 1839. Daguerre treated a silver-plated sheet of copper with iodine vapor to give it a coating of light-sensitive silver iodide. After exposure in the camera, the image was developed by mercury vapor and fixed with a strong solution of ordinary salt (sodium chloride). Henry Fox Talbot perfected a different process, the calotype, in 1840. As commercialized, both processes used very simple cameras consisting of two nested boxes. The rear box had a removable ground glass screen and could slide in and out to adjust the focus. After focusing, the ground glass was replaced with a light-tight holder containing the sensitized plate or paper and the lens was capped. Then the photographer opened the front cover of the holder, uncapped the lens, and counted off as many minutes as the lighting conditions seemed to require before replacing the cap and closing the holder. Despite this mechanical simplicity, high-quality achromatic lenses were standard.

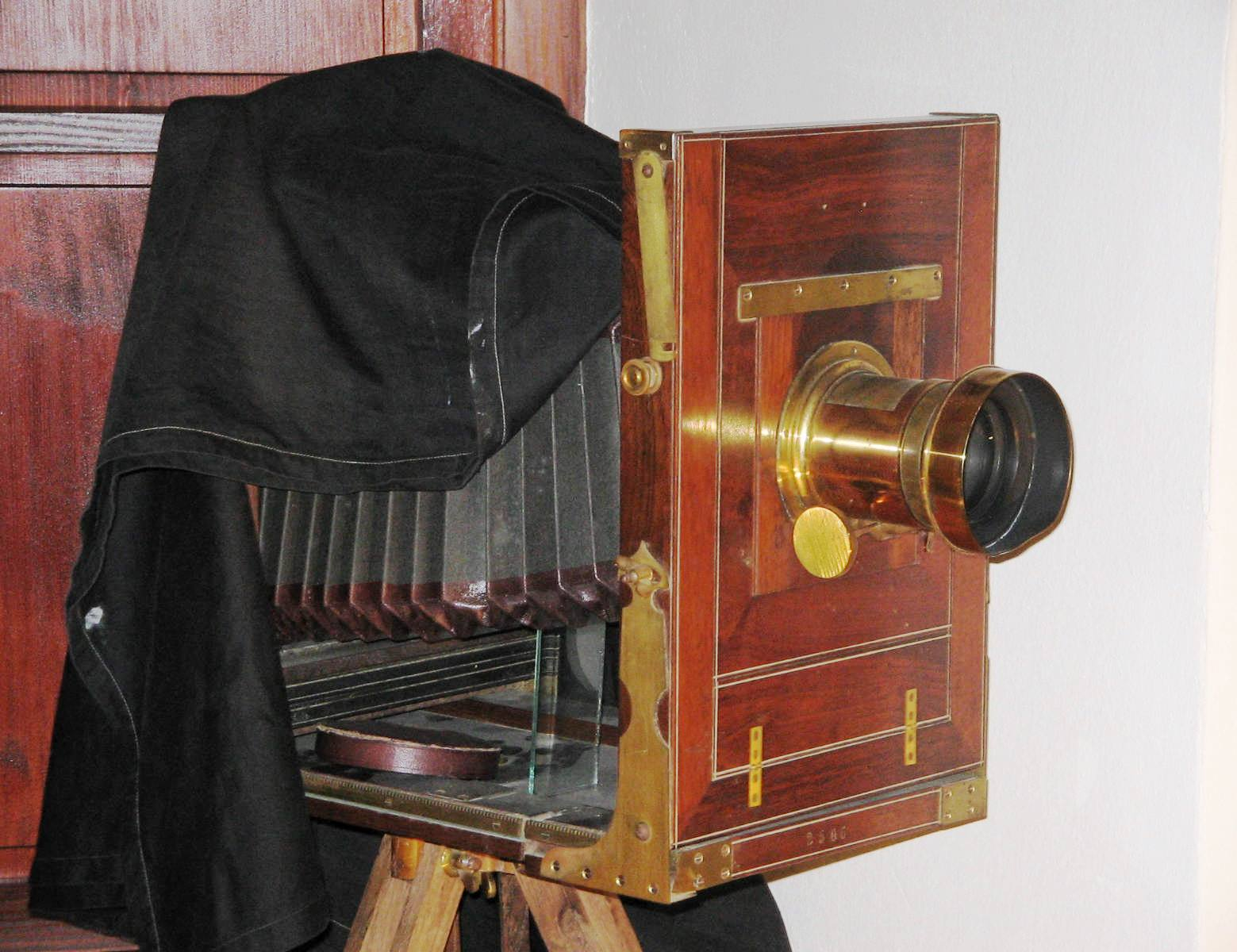
Late 19th-century studio camera

== Dry plates ==
Collodion dry plates had been available since 1857, thanks to the work of Désiré van Monckhoven, but it was not until the invention of the gelatin dry plate in 1871 by Richard Leach Maddox that the wet plate process could be rivaled in quality and speed. The 1878 discovery that heat-ripening a gelatin emulsion greatly increased its sensitivity finally made so-called "instantaneous" snapshot exposures practical. For the first time, a tripod or other support was no longer an absolute necessity. With daylight and a fast plate or film, a small camera could be hand-held while taking the picture. The ranks of amateur photographers swelled and informal "candid" portraits became popular. There was a proliferation of camera designs, from single- and twin-lens reflexes to large and bulky field cameras, simple box cameras, and even "detective cameras" disguised as pocket watches, hats, or other objects.

The short exposure times that made candid photography possible also necessitated another innovation, the mechanical shutter. The very first shutters were separate accessories, though built-in shutters were common by the end of the 19th century.

== Invention of photographic film ==
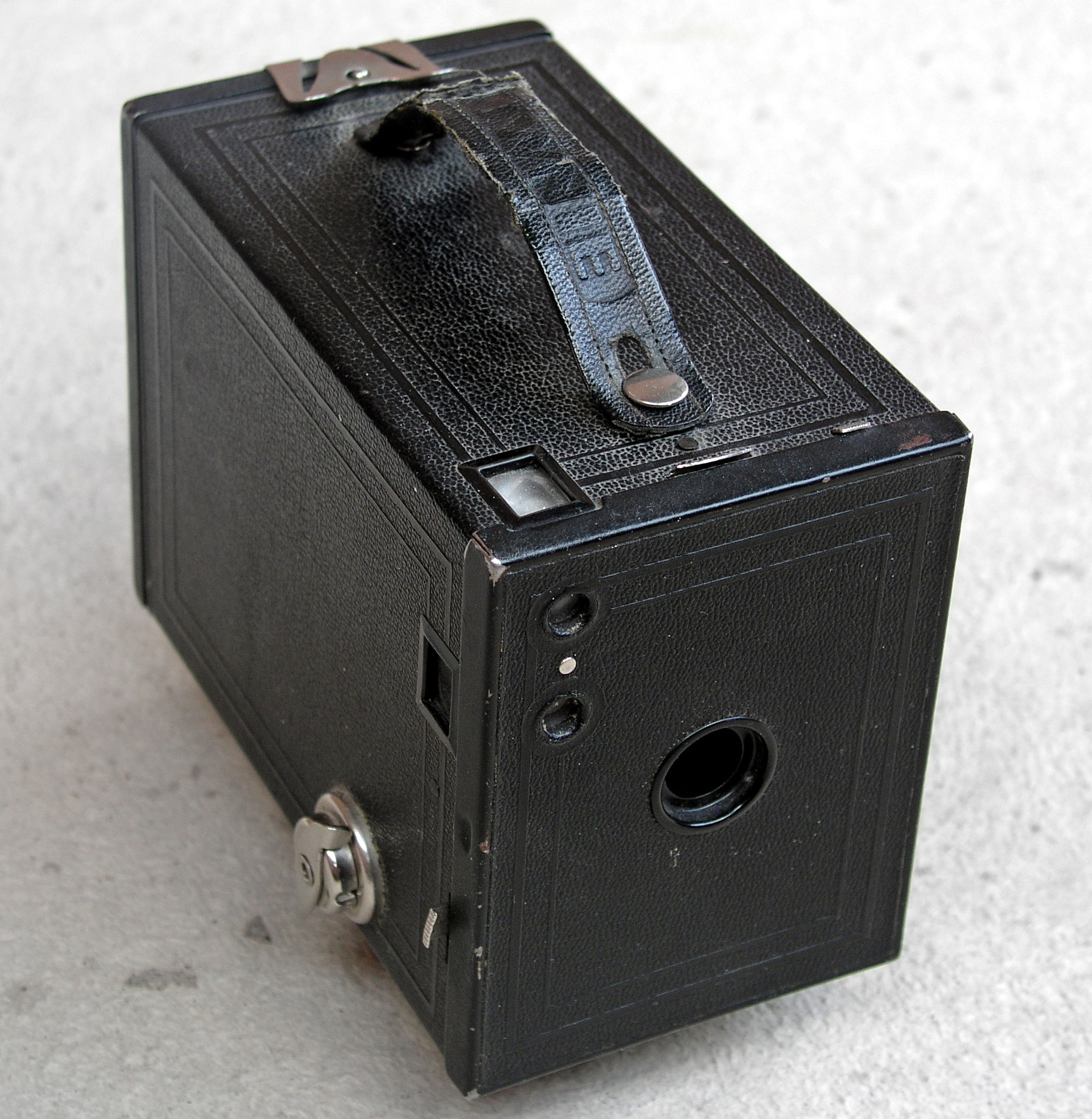
Kodak No. 2 Brownie box camera, circa 1920

The use of photographic film was pioneered by George Eastman, who started manufacturing paper film in 1885 before switching to celluloid in 1888–1889. His first camera, which he called the "Kodak", was first offered for sale in 1888. It was a very simple box camera with a fixed-focus lens and single shutter speed, which along with its relatively low price appealed to the average consumer. The Kodak came pre-loaded with enough film for 100 exposures and needed to be sent back to the factory for processing and reloading when the roll was finished. By the end of the 19th century Eastman had expanded his lineup to several models including both box and folding cameras.

In 1900, Eastman took mass-market photography one step further with the Brownie, a simple and very inexpensive box camera that introduced the concept of the snapshot. The Brownie was extremely popular and various models remained on sale until the 1960s.

Film also allowed the movie camera to develop from an expensive toy to a practical commercial tool.

Despite the advances in low-cost photography made possible by Eastman, plate cameras still offered higher-quality prints and remained popular well into the 20th century. To compete with rollfilm cameras, which offered a larger number of exposures per loading, many inexpensive plate cameras from this era were equipped with magazines to hold several plates at once. Special backs for plate cameras allowing them to use film packs or rollfilm were also available, as were backs that enabled rollfilm cameras to use plates.

Except for a few special types such as Schmidt cameras, most professional astrographs continued to use plates until the end of the 20th century when electronic photography replaced them.

== 35 mm ==
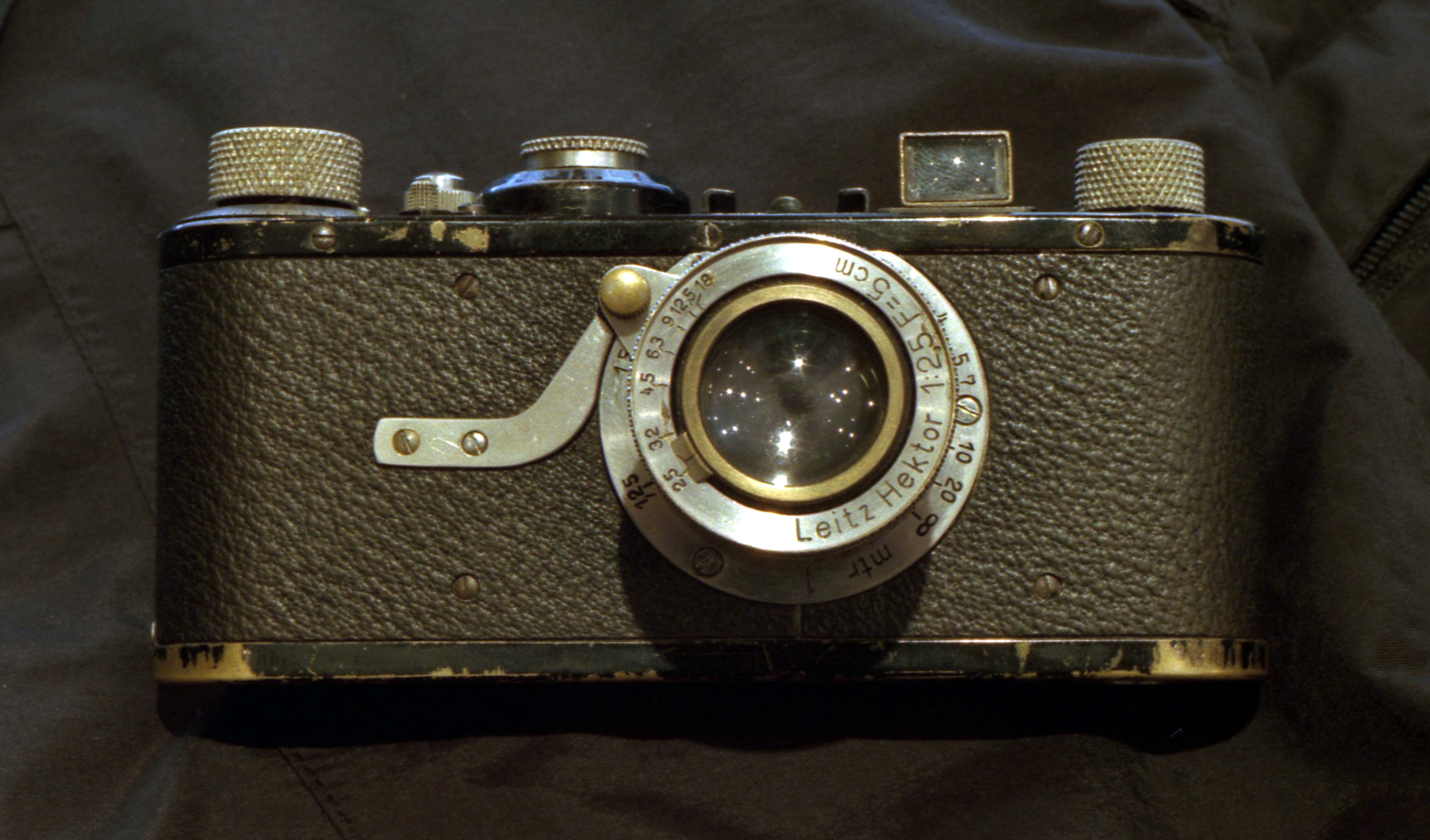
Leica I, 1925

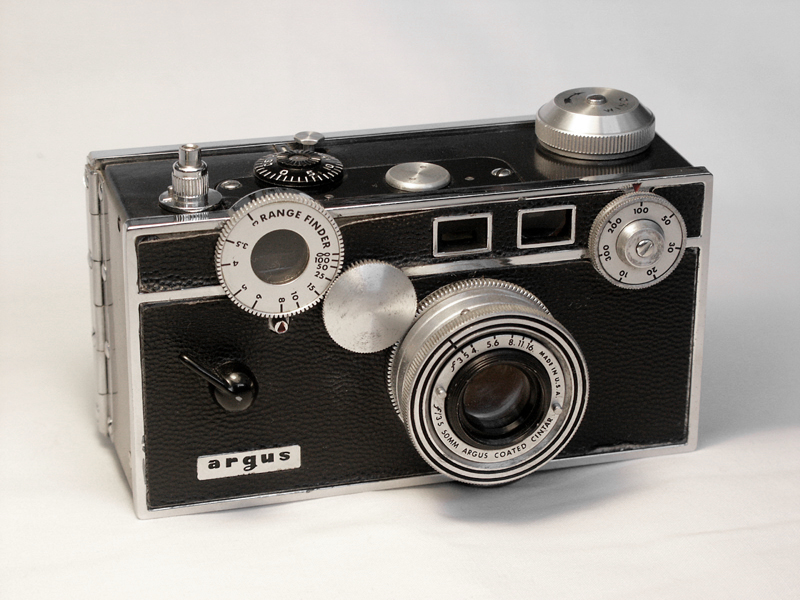
Argus C3, 1939

A number of manufacturers started to use 35 mm film for still photography between 1905 and 1913. The first 35 mm cameras available to the public, and reaching significant numbers in sales were the Tourist Multiple, in 1913, and the Simplex, in 1914.

Oskar Barnack, who was in charge of research and development at Leitz, decided to investigate using 35 mm cine film for still cameras while attempting to build a compact camera capable of making high-quality enlargements. He built his prototype 35 mm camera (Ur-Leica) around 1913, though further development was delayed for several years by World War I. It wasn't until after World War I that Leica commercialized their first 35 mm cameras. Leitz test-marketed the design between 1923 and 1924, receiving enough positive feedback that the camera was put into production as the Leica I (for Leitz camera) in 1925. The Leica's immediate popularity spawned several of competitors, most notably the Contax (introduced in 1932), and cemented the position of 35 mm as the format of choice for high-end compact cameras.

Kodak got into the market with the Retina I in 1934, which introduced the 135 cartridge used in all modern 35 mm cameras. Although the Retina was comparatively inexpensive, 35 mm cameras were still out of reach for most people and rollfilm remained the format of choice for mass-market cameras. This changed in 1936 with the introduction of the inexpensive Argus A and to an even greater extent in 1939 with the arrival of the immensely popular Argus C3. Although the cheapest cameras still used rollfilm, 35 mm film had come to dominate the market by the time the C3 was discontinued in 1966.

The fledgling Japanese camera industry began to take off in 1936 with the Canon 35 mm rangefinder, an improved version of the 1933 Kwanon prototype. Japanese cameras would begin to become popular in the West after Korean War veterans and soldiers stationed in Japan brought them back to the United States and elsewhere.

== TLRs and SLRs ==
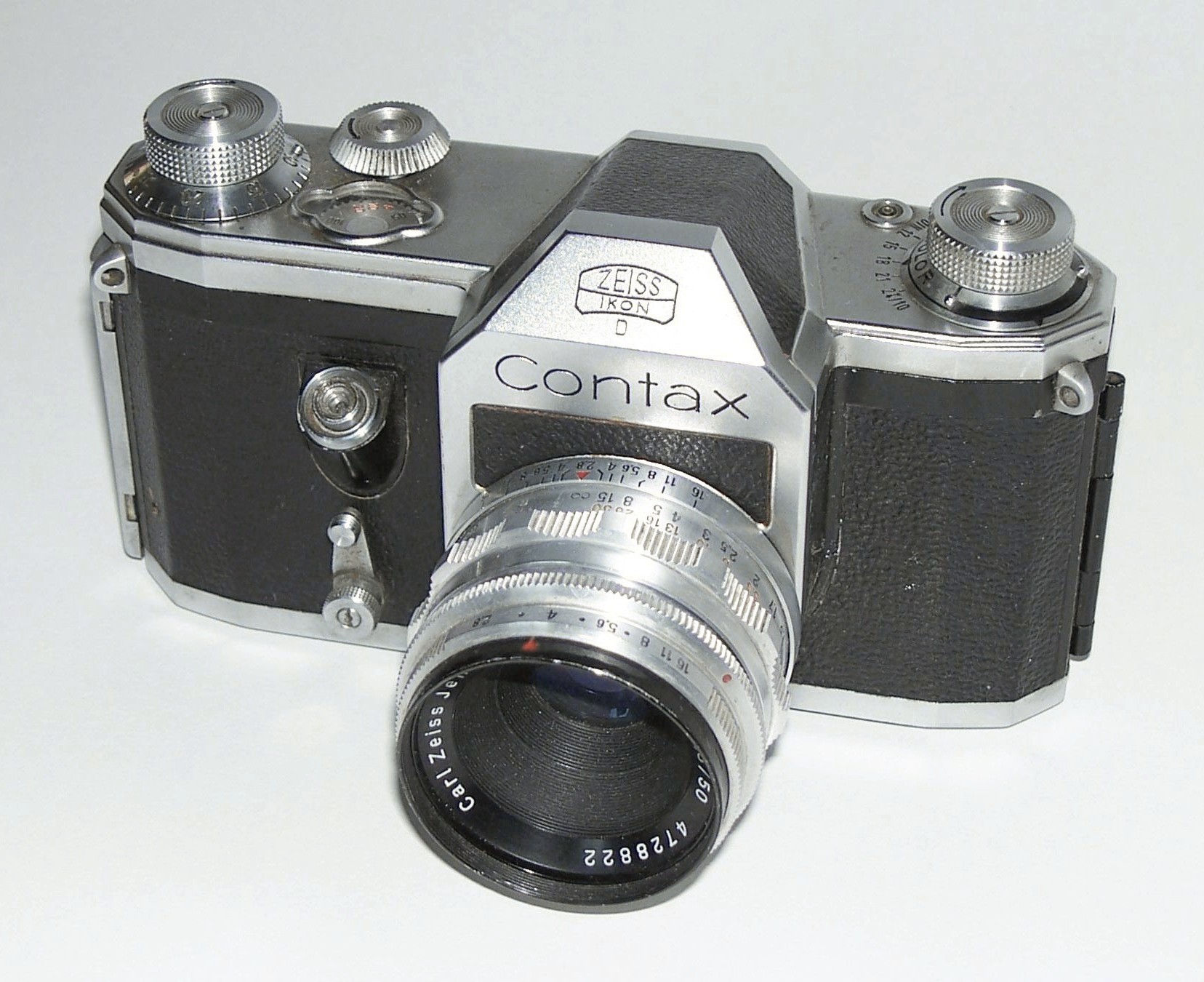
Contax S of 1949 – , the second pentaprism SLR The first SLR with a fixed pentaprism was the Rectaflex

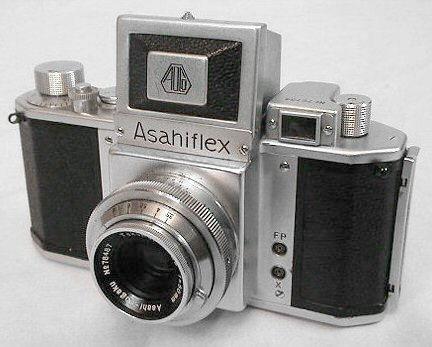
Asahiflex IIb, 1954

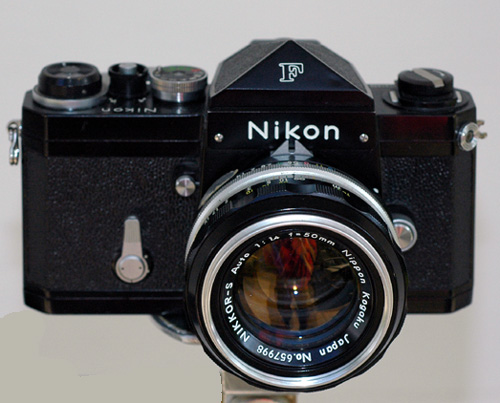
Nikon F of 1959 – the first Japanese system camera

The first practical reflex camera was the Franke & Heidecke Rolleiflex medium format TLR of 1928. Though both single- and twin-lens reflex cameras had been available for decades, they were too bulky to achieve much popularity. The Rolleiflex, however, was sufficiently compact to achieve widespread popularity and the medium-format TLR design became popular for both high- and low-end cameras.

A similar revolution in SLR design began in 1933 with the introduction of the Ihagee Exakta, a compact SLR which used 127 rollfilm. This was followed three years later by the first Western SLR to use 135 film (otherwise known as 35 mm film), the Kine Exakta (World's first true 35 mm SLR was Soviet "Sport" camera, marketed several months before Kine Exakta, though "Sport" used its own film cartridge). The 35 mm SLR design gained immediate popularity and there was an explosion of new models and innovative features after World War II. There were also a few 35 mm TLRs, the best-known of which was the Contaflex of 1935, but for the most part these met with little success.

The first major post-war SLR innovation was the eye-level viewfinder, which first appeared on the Hungarian Duflex in 1947 and was refined in 1948 with the Contax S, the first camera to use a pentaprism. Prior to this, all SLRs were equipped with waist-level focusing screens. The Duflex was also the first SLR with an instant-return mirror, which prevented the viewfinder from being blacked out after each exposure. This same time period also saw the introduction of the Hasselblad 1600F, which set the standard for medium format SLRs for decades.

In 1952 the Asahi Optical Company (which later became well known for its Pentax cameras) introduced the first Japanese SLR using 135 film, the Asahiflex. Several other Japanese camera makers also entered the SLR market in the 1950s, including Canon, Yashica, and Nikon. Nikon's entry, the Nikon F, had a full line of interchangeable components and accessories and is generally regarded as the first Japanese system camera. It was the F, along with the earlier S series of rangefinder cameras, that helped establish Nikon's reputation as a maker of professional-quality equipment and one of the world's best known brands.

== Instant cameras ==
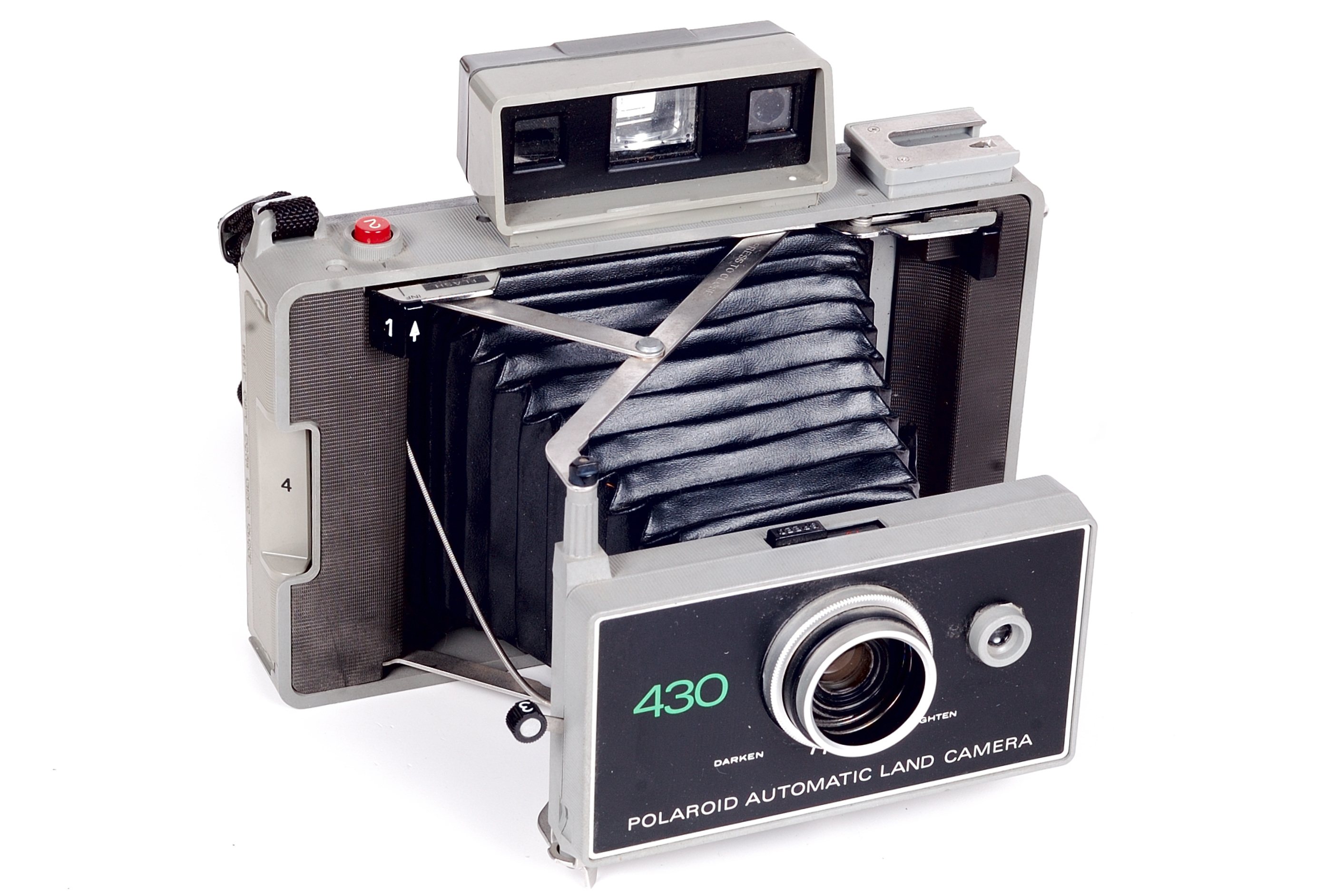
Polaroid Model 430, 1971

While conventional cameras were becoming more refined and sophisticated, an entirely new type of camera appeared on the market in 1949. This was the Polaroid Model 95, the world's first viable instant-picture camera. Known as a Land Camera after its inventor, of 1965, was a huge success and remains one of the top-selling cameras of all time.

== Automation ==
In 1936, Albert Einstein and Gustav Peter Bucky designed one of the first automatic cameras which used an electric eye to determine aperture and exposure. The first production camera to feature automatic exposure was the Super Kodak Six-20 in 1938, equipped with a selenium light meter. But its extremely high price (for the time) of $225 (equivalent to $5,146 in 2025) kept it from achieving any degree of success. By the 1960s, however, low-cost electronic components were commonplace and cameras equipped with light meters and automatic exposure systems became increasingly widespread.

The next technological advance came in 1960, when the German Mec 16 SB subminiature became the first camera to place the light meter behind the lens for more accurate metering. However, through-the-lens metering ultimately became a feature more commonly found on SLRs than other types of camera; the first SLR equipped with a TTL system was the Topcon RE Super of 1962.

== Digital cameras ==
Digital cameras differ from their analog predecessors primarily in that they do not use film, but capture and save photographs on digital memory cards or internal storage instead. Their low operating costs have relegated chemical cameras to niche markets. Digital cameras now include wireless communication capabilities (for example Wi-Fi or Bluetooth) to transfer, print, or share photos, and are commonly found on mobile phones.

=== Digital imaging technology ===
The first semiconductor image sensor was the CCD, invented by Willard S. Boyle and George E. Smith at Bell Labs in 1969. While researching MOS technology, they realized that an electric charge was the analogy of the magnetic bubble and that it could be stored on a tiny MOS capacitor. As it was fairly straightforward to fabricate a series of MOS capacitors in a row, they connected a suitable voltage to them so that the charge could be stepped along from one to the next. The CCD is a semiconductor circuit that was later used in the first digital video cameras for television broadcasting.

The NMOS active-pixel sensor (APS) was invented by Olympus in Japan during the mid-1980s. This was enabled by advances in MOS semiconductor device fabrication, with MOSFET scaling reaching smaller micron and then sub-micron levels. The NMOS APS was fabricated by Tsutomu Nakamura's team at Olympus in 1985. The CMOS active-pixel sensor (CMOS sensor) was later developed by Eric Fossum's team at the NASA Jet Propulsion Laboratory in 1993.

=== Early digital camera prototypes ===
The concept of digitizing images on scanners, and the concept of digitizing video signals, predate the concept of making still pictures by digitizing signals from an array of discrete sensor elements. Early spy satellites used the extremely complex and expensive method of de-orbit and airborne retrieval of film canisters. Technology was pushed to skip these steps through the use of in-satellite developing and electronic scanning of the film for direct transmission to the ground. The amount of film was still a major limitation, and this was overcome and greatly simplified by the push to develop an electronic image capturing array that could be used instead of film. The first electronic imaging satellite was the KH-11 launched by the NRO in late 1976. It had a charge-coupled device (CCD) array with a resolution of 800 x 800 pixels (0.64 megapixels). At Philips Labs in New York, Edward Stupp, Pieter Cath and Zsolt Szilagyi filed for a patent on "All Solid State Radiation Imagers" on 6 September 1968 and constructed a flat-screen target for receiving and storing an optical image on a matrix composed of an array of photodiodes connected to a capacitor to form an array of two terminal devices connected in rows and columns. Their US patent was granted on 10 November 1970. Texas Instruments engineer Willis Adcock designed a filmless camera that was not digital and applied for a patent in 1972, but it is not known whether it was ever built.

The Cromemco Cyclops, introduced as a hobbyist construction project in 1975, was the first digital camera to be interfaced to a microcomputer. Its image sensor was a modified metal–oxide–semiconductor (MOS) dynamic RAM (DRAM) memory chip.

The first recorded attempt at building a self-contained digital camera was in 1975 by Steven Sasson, an engineer at Eastman Kodak. It used the then-new solid-state CCD image sensor chips developed by Fairchild Semiconductor in 1973. The camera weighed 8 pounds (3.6 kg), recorded black-and-white images to a compact cassette tape, had a resolution of 0.01 megapixels (10,000 pixels), and took 23 seconds to capture its first image in December 1975. The prototype camera was a technical exercise, not intended for production.

=== Analog electronic cameras ===
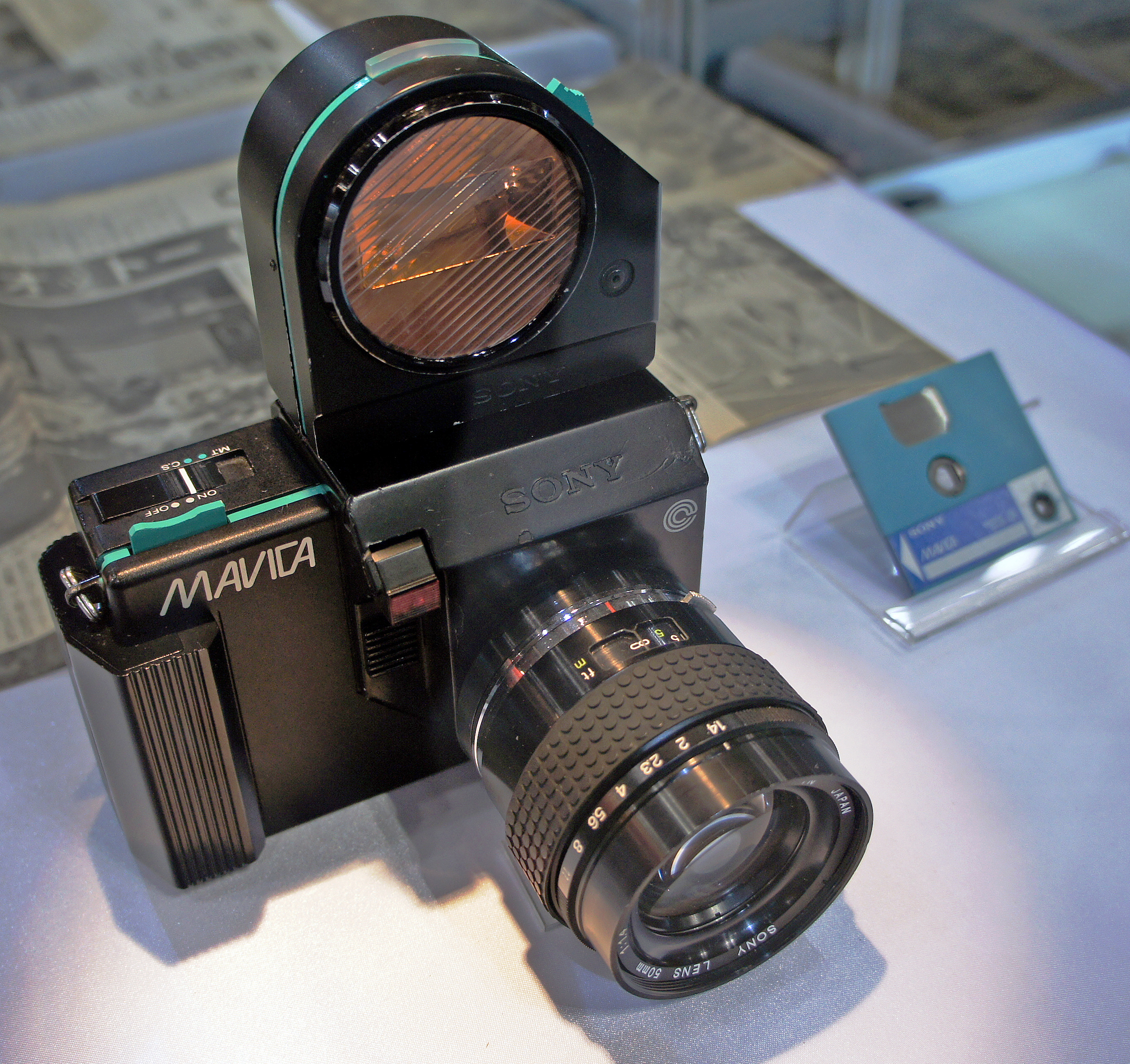
Sony Mavica, 1981

Handheld electronic cameras, in the sense of a device meant to be carried and used as a handheld film camera, appeared in 1981 with the demonstration of the Sony Mavica (Magnetic Video Camera). This is not to be confused with the later cameras by Sony that also bore the Mavica name. This was an analog camera, in that it recorded pixel signals continuously, as videotape machines did, without converting them to discrete levels; it recorded television-like signals to a 2 × 2 inch "video floppy". In essence, it was a video movie camera that recorded single frames, 50 per disk in field mode, and 25 per disk in frame mode. The image quality was considered equal to that of then-current televisions.

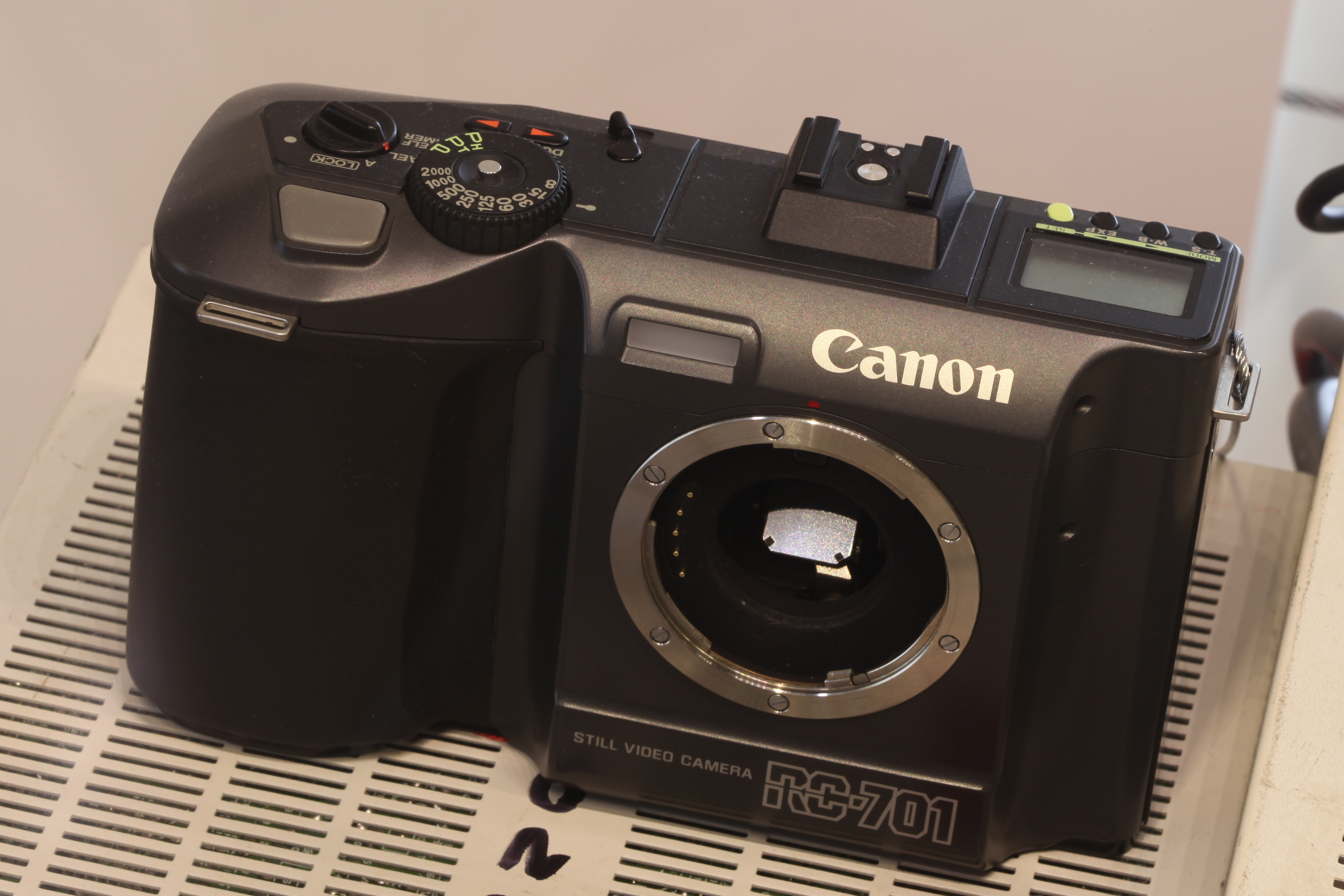
Canon RC-701, 1986

Analog electronic cameras do not appear to have reached the market until 1986 with the Canon RC-701. Canon demonstrated a prototype of this model at the 1984 Summer Olympics, printing the images in the Yomiuri Shimbun, a Japanese newspaper. In the United States, the first publication to use these cameras for real reportage was USA Today, in its coverage of World Series baseball. Several factors held back the widespread adoption of analog cameras; the cost (upwards of $20,000, equivalent to $59,000 in 2025), poor image quality compared to film, and the lack of quality affordable printers. Capturing and printing an image originally required access to equipment such as a frame grabber, which was beyond the reach of the average consumer. The "video floppy" disks later had several reader devices available for viewing on a screen but were never standardized as a computer drive.

The early adopters tended to be in the news media, where the cost was negated by the utility and the ability to transmit images by telephone lines. The poor image quality was offset by the low resolution of newspaper graphics. This capability to transmit images without a satellite link was useful during the 1989 Tiananmen Square protests and massacre and the first Gulf War in 1991.

US government agencies also took a strong interest in the still video concept, notably the US Navy for use as a real-time air-to-sea surveillance system.

The first analog electronic camera marketed to consumers may have been the Casio VS-101 in 1987. A notable analog camera produced the same year was the Nikon QV-1000C, designed as a press camera and not offered for sale to general users, which sold only a few hundred units. It recorded images in greyscale, and the quality in newspaper print was equal to film cameras. In appearance it closely resembled a modern digital single-lens reflex camera. Images were stored on video floppy disks.

Silicon Film, a proposed digital sensor cartridge for film cameras that would allow 35 mm cameras to take digital photographs without modification was announced in late 1998. Silicon Film was to work as a roll of 35 mm film, with a 1.3 megapixel sensor behind the lens and a battery and storage unit fitting in the film holder in the camera. The product, which was never released, became increasingly obsolete due to improvements in digital camera technology and affordability. Silicon Films' parent company filed for bankruptcy in 2001.

=== Early true digital cameras ===
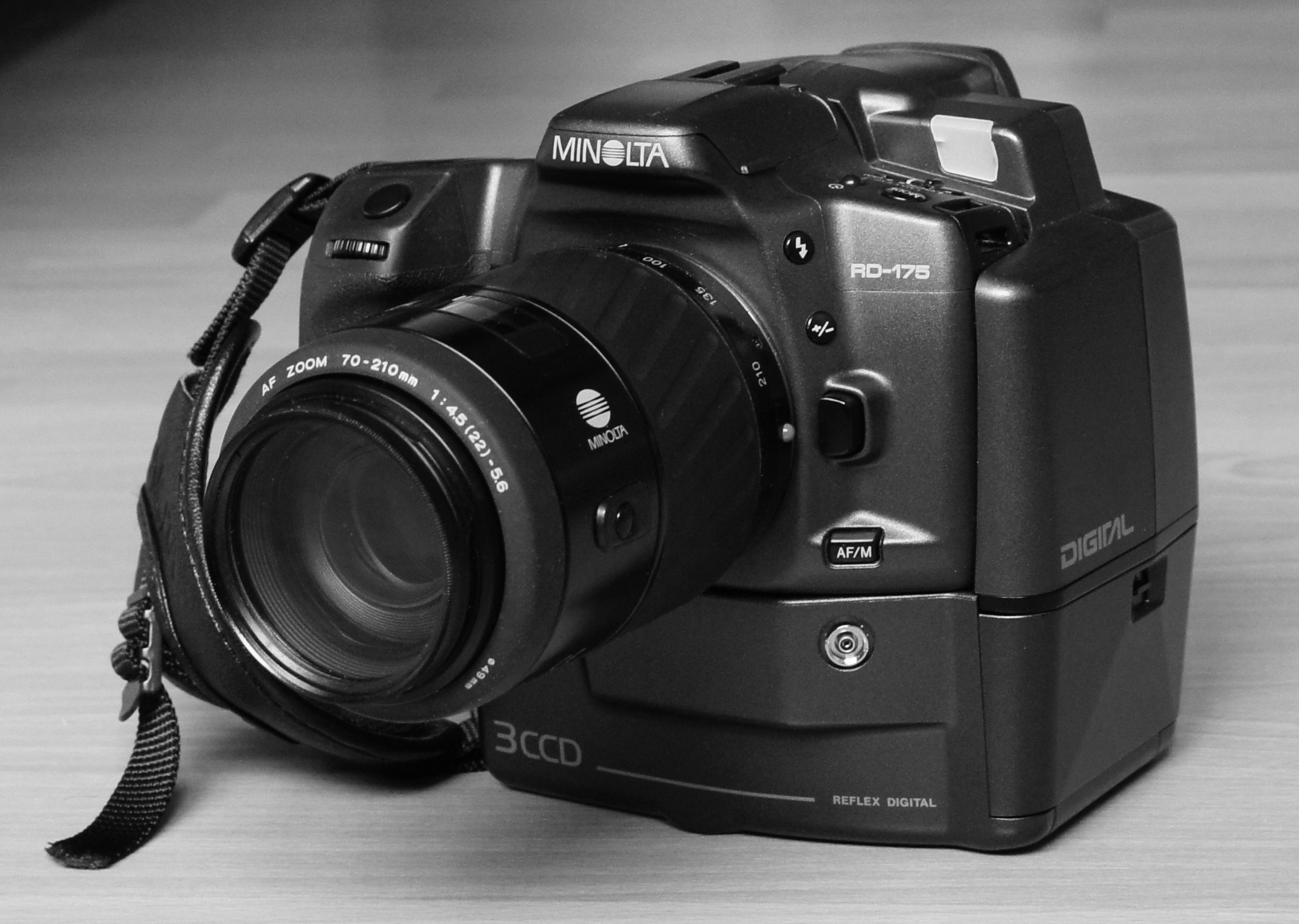
Minolta RD-175, introduced by Minolta in 1995.

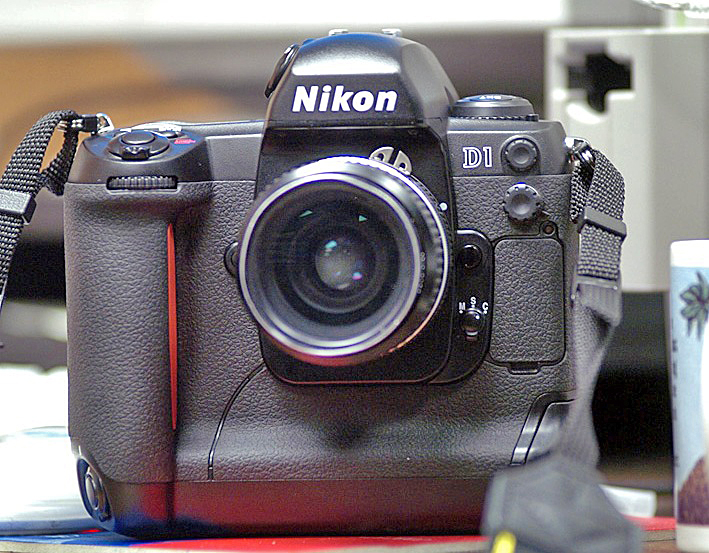
Nikon D1, 1999

By the late 1970s, the technology required to produce truly commercial digital cameras existed. The first true portable digital camera that recorded images as a computerized file was likely the Fuji DS-1P of 1988, which recorded to a 2 MB SRAM (static RAM) memory card that used a battery to keep the data in memory. This camera was never marketed to the public.

The first digital camera of any kind ever sold commercially was possibly the MegaVision Tessera in 1987 though there is not extensive documentation of its sale known. The first portable digital camera that was actually marketed commercially was sold in December 1989 in Japan, the DS-X by Fuji The first commercially available portable digital camera in the United States was the Dycam Model 1, first shipped in November 1990. It was originally a commercial failure because it was black-and-white, low in resolution, and cost nearly $1,000 (equivalent to $2,500 in 2025). It later saw modest success when it was re-sold as the Logitech Fotoman in 1992. It used a CCD image sensor, stored pictures digitally, and connected directly to a computer for download.

=== Digital SLRs (DSLRs) ===
Nikon was interested in digital photography since the mid-1980s. In July 1986, while presenting to Photokina, Nikon introduced an operational prototype of the first SLR-type digital camera (Still Video Camera), manufactured by Panasonic. The Nikon SVC was built around a 300,000 pixel 2/3" charge-coupled sensor. The storage media, a magnetic floppy inside the camera, allowed 25 or 50 B&W images to be recorded, depending on the resolution.

In 1991, Kodak brought to market the Kodak DCS (Kodak Digital Camera System), the beginning of a long line of professional Kodak DCS SLR cameras that were based in part on film bodies, often Nikons. The Kodak DCS was the first commercially available Digital SLR (DSLR) It used a 1.3 megapixel sensor, had a bulky external digital storage system, and was priced at $13,000 (equivalent to $31,000 in 2025). With the introduction the next year of the Kodak DCS-200, the Kodak DCS was referred to as the Kodak DCS-100.

The move to digital formats was helped by the formation of the first JPEG and MPEG standards in 1988, which allowed image and video files to be compressed for storage. The first consumer camera with a liquid crystal display on the back was the Casio QV-10 developed by a team led by Hiroyuki Suetaka in 1995. The first camera to use CompactFlash was the Kodak DC-25 in 1996. The first camera that offered the ability to record video clips may have been the Ricoh RDC-1 in 1995.

In 1995 Minolta introduced the RD-175, which was based on the Minolta 500si SLR with a splitter and three independent CCDs. This combination delivered 1.75M pixels. The benefit of using an SLR base was the ability to use any existing Minolta AF mount lens. 1999 saw the introduction of the Nikon D1, a 2.74 megapixel camera that was the first digital SLR developed entirely from the ground up by a major manufacturer, and at a cost of under $6,000 (equivalent to $12,700 in 2025) at introduction was affordable by professional photographers and high-end consumers. This camera also used Nikon F-mount lenses, which meant film photographers could use many of the same lenses they already owned.

Digital camera sales continued to flourish, driven by technology advances. The digital market segmented into different categories, Compact Digital Still Cameras, Bridge Cameras, Mirrorless Compacts and Digital SLRs.

Since 2003, digital cameras have outsold film cameras and Kodak announced in January 2004 that they would no longer sell Kodak-branded film cameras in the developed world – and in 2012 filed for bankruptcy after struggling to adapt to the changing industry.

=== Camera phones ===
The first commercial camera phone was the Kyocera Visual Phone VP-210, released in Japan in May 1999. It was called a "mobile videophone" at the time, and had a 110,000-pixel front-facing camera. It stored up to 20 JPEG digital images, which could be sent over e-mail, or the phone could send up to two images per second over Japan's Personal Handy-phone System (PHS) cellular network. The Samsung SCH-V200, released in South Korea in June 2000, was also one of the first phones with a built-in camera. It had a TFT liquid-crystal display (LCD) and stored up to 20 digital photos at 350,000-pixel resolution. However, it could not send the resulting image over a telephone line, instead requiring a computer connection to access photos. The first mass-market camera phone was the J-SH04, a Sharp J-Phone model sold in Japan in November 2000. It could instantly transmit pictures via cell phone telecommunication.

One of the major technology advances was the development of CMOS sensors, which helped drive sensor costs low enough to enable the widespread adoption of camera phones. Smartphones now routinely include high resolution digital cameras.

== See also ==
- History of photography
- Photographic lens design
- Movie camera
- List of photographs considered the most important
