= Alliance of German Organizations Abroad =

Nazi organization for Germans abroad

The Alliance of German Organizations Abroad (German: Verband deutscher Vereine im Ausland, or VdV) was a National Socialist umbrella organization founded in 1934 to unite all foreign Germans outside of the Reich. Its headquarters was in Berlin. The VdV was supposed to organize these Germans and to influence and win them over with Nazi propaganda, insofar as they were not yet part of the Foreign Organization of the NSDAP (NSDAP/AO). Its journal was the Heimatbrief (Letter from Home).

== Bibliography ==
- Christian Zentner, Friedemann Bedürftig (1991). The Encyclopedia of the Third Reich. Macmillan, New York. ISBN 0-02-897502-2

== See also ==
- Volksbund für das Deutschtum im Ausland
- Bund Deutscher Osten
