= Mec 16 SB =

MEC 16 SB
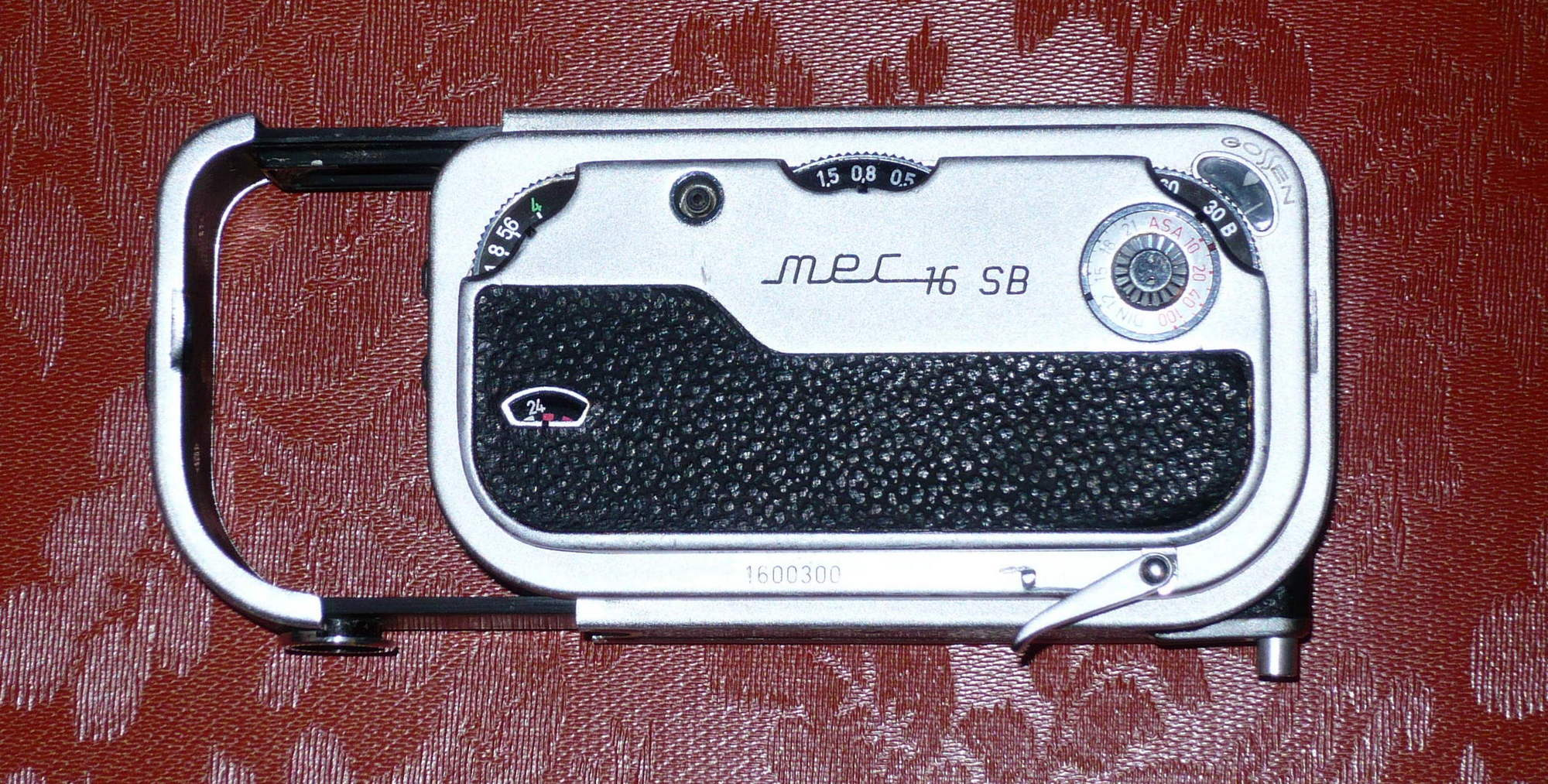
- MEC-16 SB 16mm subminiature camera

Overview
- Maker: Feinwerktechnik Gmbh
- Type: subminiature camera

Lens
- Lens mount: Rodenstock Heligon 1:2/22mm

Sensor/medium
- Sensor size: 16 mm
- Recording medium: Film

Exposure/metering
- Exposure: built-in
- Exposure metering: TTL

General
- Made in: Germany

The MEC 16 SB is a German 16 mm subminiature camera launched in 1957 by Feinwerktechnik GmbH of Lahr, Germany. The lens is a Rodenstock Heligon 1:2/22mm with diaphragm working on principle of "cat's pupil". The MEC 16 SB was designed by A. Armbruster. It is the first camera with built-in exposure meter, capable of measuring the light through the lens, the so-called Through-the-lens metering (TTL).

Focal plane shutter functions at B,1/30,1/60,1/125,1/250,1/500,1/1000

Though it is not a single-lens reflex camera, it has been recognized for being the first camera having a serially integrated exposure meter (Gossen), capable of measuring light through its picture-taking lens, connected.

MEC-16 uses single or double perforated 16mm film in special metal cassette. Frame size 10x14mm.
