= Vincent Chevalier =

French inventor

- Born: 1770; Paris, France
- Died: 1841 (aged 70–71); Paris, France
- Occupation: Optician

Vincent Chevalier (1770 - 1841) was a French engineer, inventor and optician.

== Biography ==
He was born in 1770 in Paris, France. He played a key role in the history of the camera.

The very first photograph was taken in 1825 by Joseph Nicéphore Niépce, a French inventor who used a sliding wooden camera box made by Chevalier.

He died in 1841 in Paris, France.

His son became a manufacturer of cameras and lenses.

== Legacy ==
Chevalier was the first to develop a microscope to use a combination of lens elements corrected for chromatic aberrations.

The sophisticated compound lenses manufactured by Chevalier were described as the "cutting-edge technological craftsmanship of the day".

== See also ==
- History of the camera
- Heliography
