= Julius Scharlach =

German lawyer and businessman

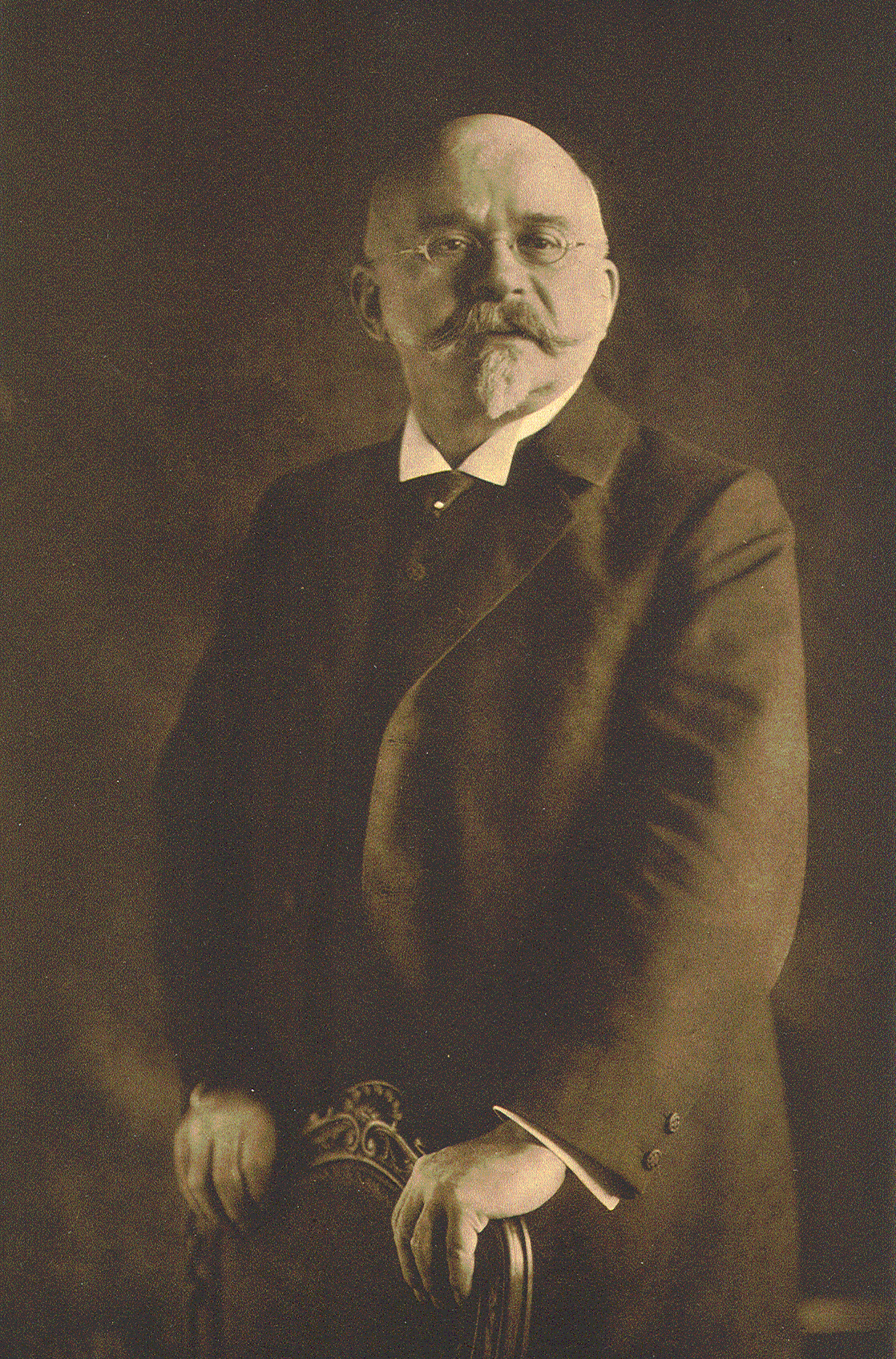
Julius Scharlach (1905)

Julius Scharlach (February 12, 1842 in Bodenwerder – March 18, 1908 in Hamburg) was a Hamburg lawyer, businessman and a prominent figure in the colonial history of Germany in the late 19th and early 20th century. He was a member of the Colonial Council, and founded the Verein für das Deutschtum im Ausland (VDA).

Scharlach got a degree in law from the University of Göttingen, where he became a member of Corps Hannovera Göttingen. As a lawyer, he defended the dismissed Governor of German East Africa, Carl Peters. As the lawyer of the Dynamit Nobel company, he became acquainted with leading financial circles in the United Kingdom, and with British colonialists, and between 1905 and 1908 he cooperated extensively with Cecil Rhodes, aiming at preventing conflict between Germany and the United Kingdom. Scharlach had substantial business interests in the German colonies, notably in German South-West Africa and Cameroon. He founded the Gesellschaft Süd-Kamerun, the South West Africa Company and the Otavi Minen- und Eisenbahn-Gesellschaft.

In 1902, Scharlach demanded for German Empire to create forced labour in its colonies stating: But culture is impossible without work and for that reason, the native is obliged to work from the very first day of occupation by whites. I am not afraid to state that introducing compulsory labour for natives is a moral obligation toward the latter

A river in Brazil was named in his honour by German settlers.

His son Otto Scharlach was also a corporate lawyer and took over the Scharlach law firm.

== Publications ==
- Zur Verteidigung von Dr. Carl Peters, Berlin 1898.

== Literature ==
- Ralph Erbar (2005). "Julius Scharlach". Neue Deutsche Biographie (in German). Vol. 22. Berlin: Duncker & Humblot. pp. 571–572.
- Deutsches Koloniallexikon.
