= Désiré van Monckhoven =

Belgian chemist, inventor, physicist and photographic researcher (1834–1882)

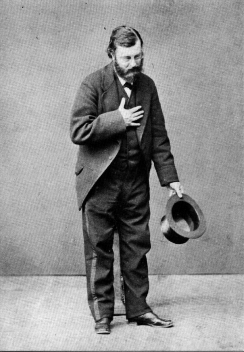
Désiré Charles Emanuel van Monckhoven.

Désiré Charles Emanuel van Monckhoven (1834–1882) was a Belgian chemist, physicist, and photographic researcher. He was also an inventor and author.

== Background ==
Monckhoven studied chemistry and lived at Ghent, in the Flemish Region of Belgium. At 18 he published his Traite general de pbotographie, In 1862 he published Traite populaire de photographie sur collodion. He introduced the dialytic enlarger and in 1864 made improvements to David Acheson Woodward's solar camera used for making photographic enlargements. Monckhoven also studied photographic optics, publishing Photographische Optik, in 1866. In 1867 he moved to Vienna and set up a studio with portrait photographer Rabending before returning to Ghent in 1870. Here he set up a laboratory where he carried out experiments in the ripening of gelatine silver bromide. Instruction sur le procede au gelatino-bromure d' argent was published in 1879 and Du gelatino-bromure d' argent in 1880.

== Works ==
He wrote several of the earliest books on photography and photographic optics. His original French works were later translated to English and other languages.

He invented or developed an enlarger (1864), a dry collodion process (1871), improvements of the carbon print process (1875–80), and improved silver-bromide gelatine emulsions.

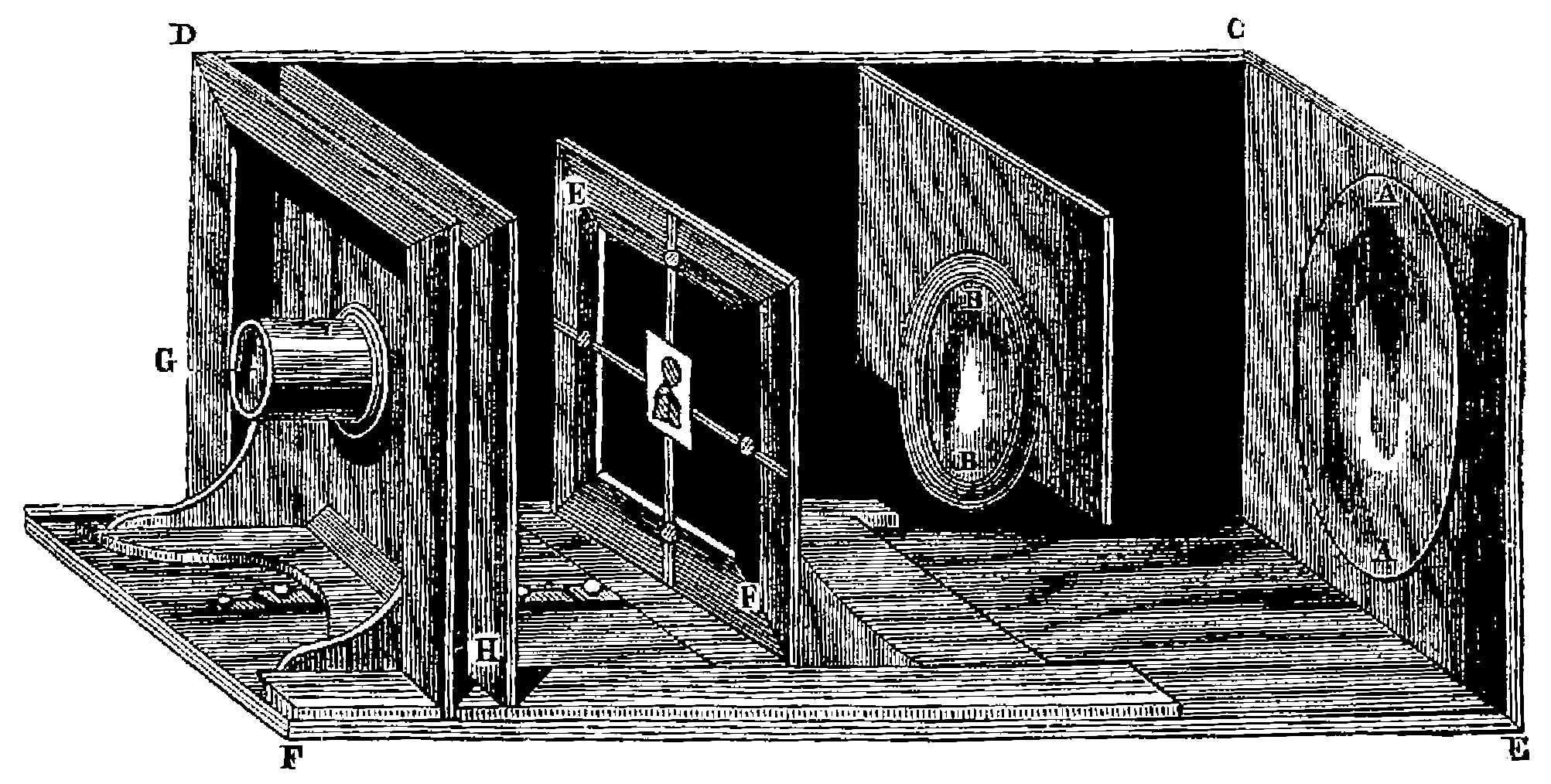
Enlarger

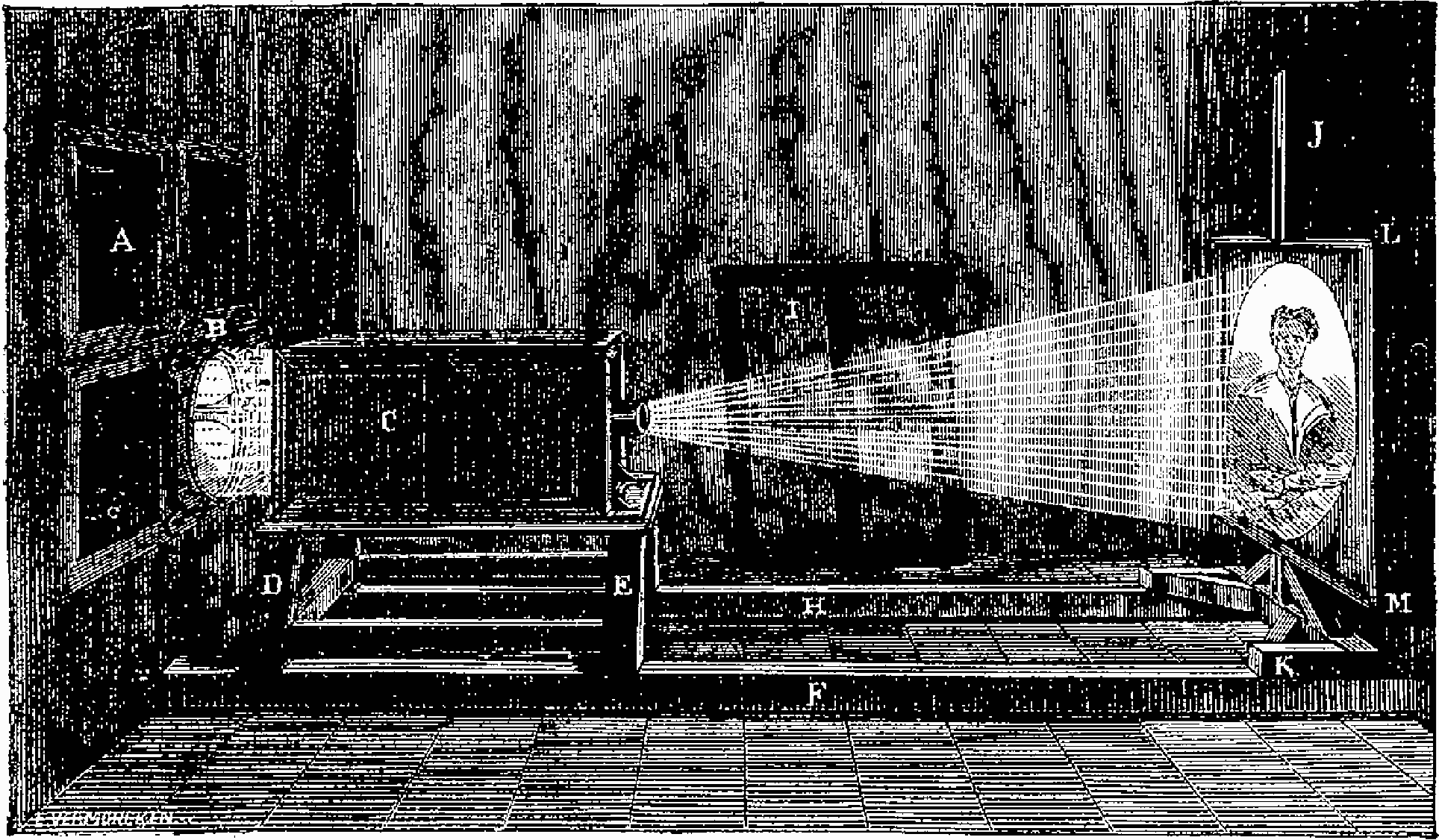

== Selected work ==
- 1857 – Méthodes simplifiées de photographie sur papier (Simplified methods of photography on paper). Paris : Marion. OCLC 16973778
- 1858 – Procédé nouveau de photographie sur plaques de fer: et notice sur les vernis photographiques et le collodion sec (A new process of photography on ferrous plates). Paris : A. Gaudin. OCLC 7011879
- 1862 – Traité populaire de photographie sur collodion. Paris: Lieber. OCLC 17454826
- 1863 – A Popular Treatise on Photography: also A description of, and remarks on, The stereoscope and photographic optics (tr. W.H. Thornthwaite) London: Virtue Brothers. OCLC 17368038 See excerpt transcription
- 1867 – Photographic Optics; Including the Description of Lenses and Enlarging Apparatus. London: Robert Hardwicke. OCLC 5332903 – reprinted by Arno Press, New York. ISBN 978-0-405-09624-2 OCLC 4642259

== See also ==
- Diaphragm (optics)
- Ghent University
- History of the camera
- Royal Photographic Society
