= Alexander Rodenstock =

German entrepreneur and economics official

Christian Alexander Rodenstock (born 24 February 1883 in Munich; died 30 August 1953 in Bad Wiessee) was a German entrepreneur and economics official, who was part of the circle of so-called Wehrwirtschaftsführer (companies that were important for the production of war materials) in Nazi Germany.

== Life ==
The son of company founder Josef Rodenstock, he studied physics and macroeconomics at the Technical University of Munich, where he became a member of Vitruvia München. Urged by his father, he gave up his studies and joined Optische Anstalt G. Rodenstock which had merely 200 employees at the time in 1905 at the age of 20. In 1908, he founded a company health insurance fund for his employees.

In 1918, he was a founding member of the Bavarian People's Party and participated in the violent suppression of the Bavarian Soviet Republic. Between 1919 and 1925, he was a member of the Munich City Council and among other things argued in favor of the technical infrastructure of the city of Munich remaining "unrestricted property of the city" – despite the corporate tendencies at the time.

In 1919, he factually took over company leadership as a partner of Optischen Werke G. Rodenstock KG. In 1920, he became the vice president and later the president of the German association for the optics industry. In 1923, he was a co-founder of the employers' association for the Bavarian metal industry and remained a board member till 1933. In 1924, he was awarded the honorary title "Kommerzienrat" for his achievements in communal and social politics. Between 1937 and 1945 he was a member of the Munich chamber of commerce as well as vice president of Deutsches Studentenwerk (German National Association for Student Affairs). Soon after his father's death he became the sole associate of the company in 1933. In the same year, he took over leadership of the local economics committee for precision mechanics and optics in Bavaria. Under his leadership, Rodenstock gradually changed from an artisanal, small business into an industrial company. In addition to eyeglasses, the company produced camera lenses for various camera manufacturers as well as other optical devices. He led his company through the difficult times of WWI and WWII, as well as the Great Depression, while consistently upholding the private character of Rodenstock as a family-owned business. During the time of Nazi Germany, his company was active in the defense industry, among other things the production of binoculars for tanks as well as optical prisms. However, the production of eyeglasses was also deemed of military importance and thus indispensable. During this time, Rodenstock employed a significant number of women and later forced laborers and prisoners of war.

Only a few weeks after the end of the war, Rodenstock obtained a permission to provide the citizens of Munich as well as the 3rd US Army with eyeglasses. A lengthy trial found him eventually not guilty of supporting the NSDAP – particularly due to his support for Jewish families, the economic losses caused by the bomb war, and the fact that there were no traceable donations to the party, and Rodenstock was permitted to take over leadership of his company again. In 1947, he became vice president of the Bavarian Senate. In the same year, he was among the founding member of the association of the Bavarian metal industry and later became its vice chairman, as well as the employers' associations in Bavaria.

At Alexander Rodenstock's death in 1953, the company had over 2,000 employees. His son Rolf Rodenstock, who had already been his stand-in when he was on trial, took over leadership after him.

== Recognitions ==
- 1953: Order of Merit of the Federal Republic of Germany
