= Verein für Deutsche Kulturbeziehungen im Ausland =

German cultural organisation

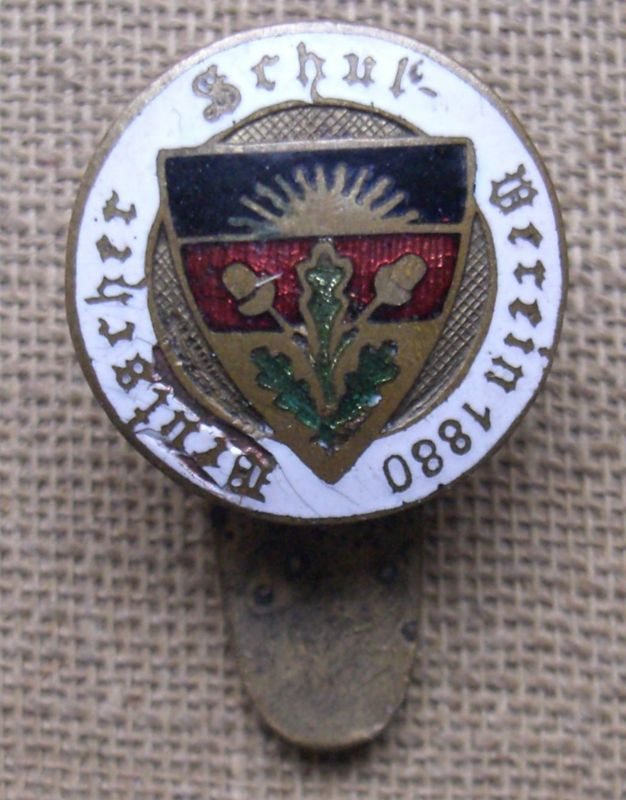
A DSV (Deutscher Schulverein) 1880 badge

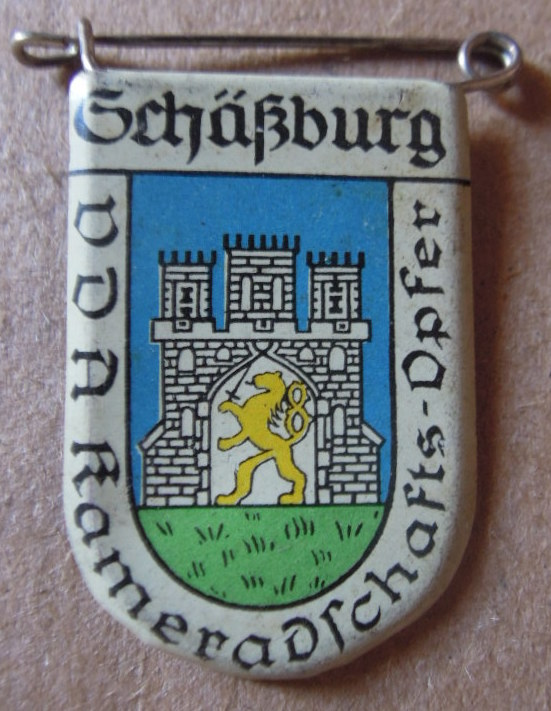
VDA Schäßburg metal donation badge, 1 of 58 distributed from 1934-1939

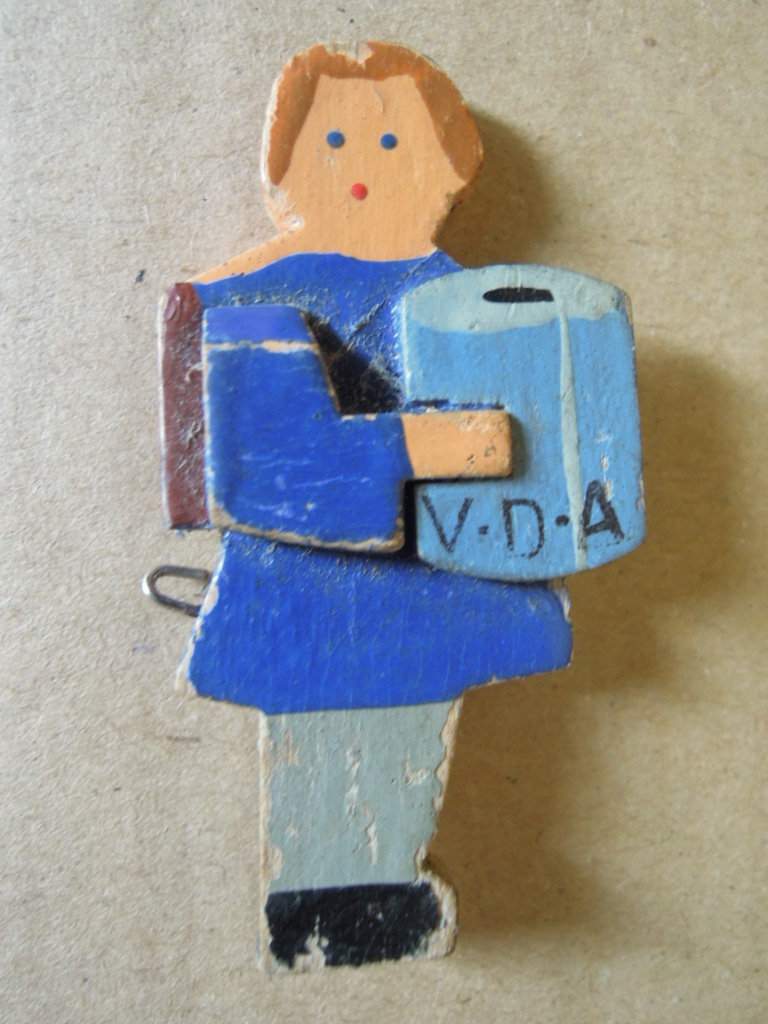
VDA Mädchen wooden donation badge, 1 of 6 distributed on 9.3.1935

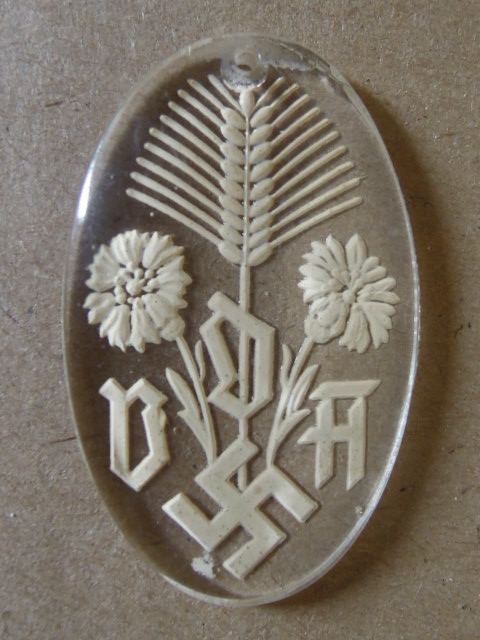
VDA Kornblume glass donation badge, 1 of 7 distributed on 24/25.6.1939

The Verein für Deutsche Kulturbeziehungen im Ausland (German: [fɐˈʔaɪn fyːɐ̯ ˈdɔʏtʃə kʊlˈtuːɐ̯bəˌtsiːʊŋən ʔɪm ˈʔaʊslant]; "Association for German cultural relations abroad"), abbreviated VDA, is a German cultural organisation. During the Nazi era it was engaged in spying across the whole world, using German minorities living in other countries. Its other goals included preservation of German culture among "racial Germans".

On 13 May 1880, in Vienna, the Deutscher Schulverein (DSV/German School Association) was formed. In 1881, the Allgemeine Deutsche Schulverein zur Erhaltung des Deutschtums im Auslande (General German School Association for the Conservation of Germanness Abroad), was formed in Berlin by Hamburg lawyer Julius Scharlach. It was modeled on the Viennese DSV. The associations in Vienna and Berlin initially worked closely together. There are donation cards with the imprint of DSV-Berlin and Vienna in existence. In 1908, the Berlin association was renamed Verein für das Deutschtum im Ausland (Association for Germanness Abroad), and the current abbreviation VDA, which is usually used, was adopted. The VDA had its own symbol, a woman's head with braids and Crown. During this time, the DSV in Vienna continued under its original name. During World War I, the VDA was at work in the service of the fighting soldiers. Its collections (donation cards such as folk song cards, Our Field Gray etc.) were there to benefit the wounded, displaced persons and the next of kin of fallen soldiers.

After 1919, the Association in Austria continued under the name Deutscher Schulverein Südmark (German school association South region). In Germany, the work of VDA was long interrupted after the war. It was not until 1925 that the association could commence its work again in Berlin, later Dresden. It was renamed Volksbund für das Deutschtum im Ausland in 1933. VDA welcomed the coming of the Nazi regime, as it shared its ideology with the Nazis, including elements such as racism. It was used to promote Nazi political and racist ideas and was especially active in schools

When Klagenfurt in Austria canceled the association's planned rally in 1933, some 18,000 participants flocked to Passau instead.

During the pre-war years and through World War II, the VDA distributed over 1,200 different donation badges, postcards and other items to raise funds for its charity work. This was done alongside other similar charity drives by organisations such as the Winterhilfswerk (WHW), the Deutsches Rotes Kreuz (DRK/German Red Cross) and others. In the middle of 1930s the organization found itself in dispute with Hitler, as it had more extensive territorial claims against other countries than Hitler was willing to demonstrate in international arena; after the Second World War started in 1939, VDA together with SS was engaged in preparing and carrying out ethnic cleansing in territories conquered by Germany.

In 1955, it was reestablished under its former name Verein für das Deutschtum im Ausland at the initiative of the Bavarian Prime Minister Wilhelm Hoegner, the Minister of Culture Alois Hundhammer, the chairman of the German Confederation of Trade Unions in Bavaria Max Wönner, industrialist Rolf Rodenstock and several prominent public figures. It became the Verein für Deutsche Kulturbeziehungen im Ausland in 1998.

Chairman of the organisation is Hartmut Koschyk, a CSU Member of Parliament.

== Notable members ==
in the early Allgemeiner Deutscher Schulverein

- Theodor Mommsen, Nobel Prize laureate for literature, member
- Heinrich von Treitschke
- Karl Haushofer
- Wilhelm Hoegner, Prime Minister of Bavaria
- Rolf Rodenstock, industrialist
- Max Wönner

Current

- Hartmut Fröschle
- Peter Iver Johannsen
- Hartmut Koschyk
- Rolf Sauerzapf
