= Rolf Rodenstock =

German industrialist

Rolf Rodenstock (1 July 1917 – 6 February 1997) was a German industrialist who was born and died in Munich.

== Life ==
Rodenstock studied marketing and management graduating in 1944 with a degree as a Diplom-Kaufmann. In 1947 he became private lecturer. From 1956 to the beginning of the 1980s he was a professor for operational organization, industrial account systems, and technical-economical rationalization at the Technical University of Munich. In 1946 he became a member of the management in his father's enterprise.

In 1953, after the death of his father, he took over the line of the G. Rodenstock optical works as the CEO. Under his leadership, the company became one of the most prominent manufacturers of eyeglass lenses, eyeglass designs, frames, and precision optics in Europe. Starting in 1983, he shared management with his son Randolf Rodenstock, who took over the operational management in 1990. Rolf Rodenstock remained partner.

According to the Encyclopedia of Company Histories, "The rise of Rodenstock to a globally acting major player in the optical market was mainly driven by Alexander Rodenstock's son Rolf.

Among many other activities, Rolf Rodenstock served as president of the Chamber of Commerce of Munich and Upper Bavaria from 1971 to 1990 as well as of the Federal association of the German Industries (BDI) from September 1978 through 1984. He was married to Inge Rodenstock (born 1936). They had son Benedict Rodenstock (born 1970).

== Publications ==
- Möglichkeiten und Grenzen unternehmerischer Tätigkeit. Cologne 1973
- Macht und Verantwortung der Verbände in der Demokratie. Cologne 1976
- Standortbestimmungen eines Unternehmers. Cologne 1977

== Awards ==
- 1959: Bavarian Order of Merit
- 1977: Order of Merit of the Federal Republic of Germany
- Officer of the Legion of Honour
- 1982: Gold Medal of Honour of the City of Munich
- 1984: Gold Medal B'nai B'rith
- 1986: Golden Bayerische Verfassungsmedaille
- 1991: Decoration of Honour for Services to the Republic of Austria

== Literature ==
- Karl Ritter von Klimesch (Hrsg.): Köpfe der Politik, Wirtschaft, Kunst und Wissenschaft. Verlag Johann Wilhelm Naumann, Augsburg 1951, o. S.
- Eva Moser (2003), Rodenstock, Rolf, in Neue Deutsche Biographie (NDB) (in German), vol. 21, Berlin: Duncker & Humblot, pp. 696–697
