= Josef Rodenstock =

German industrialist

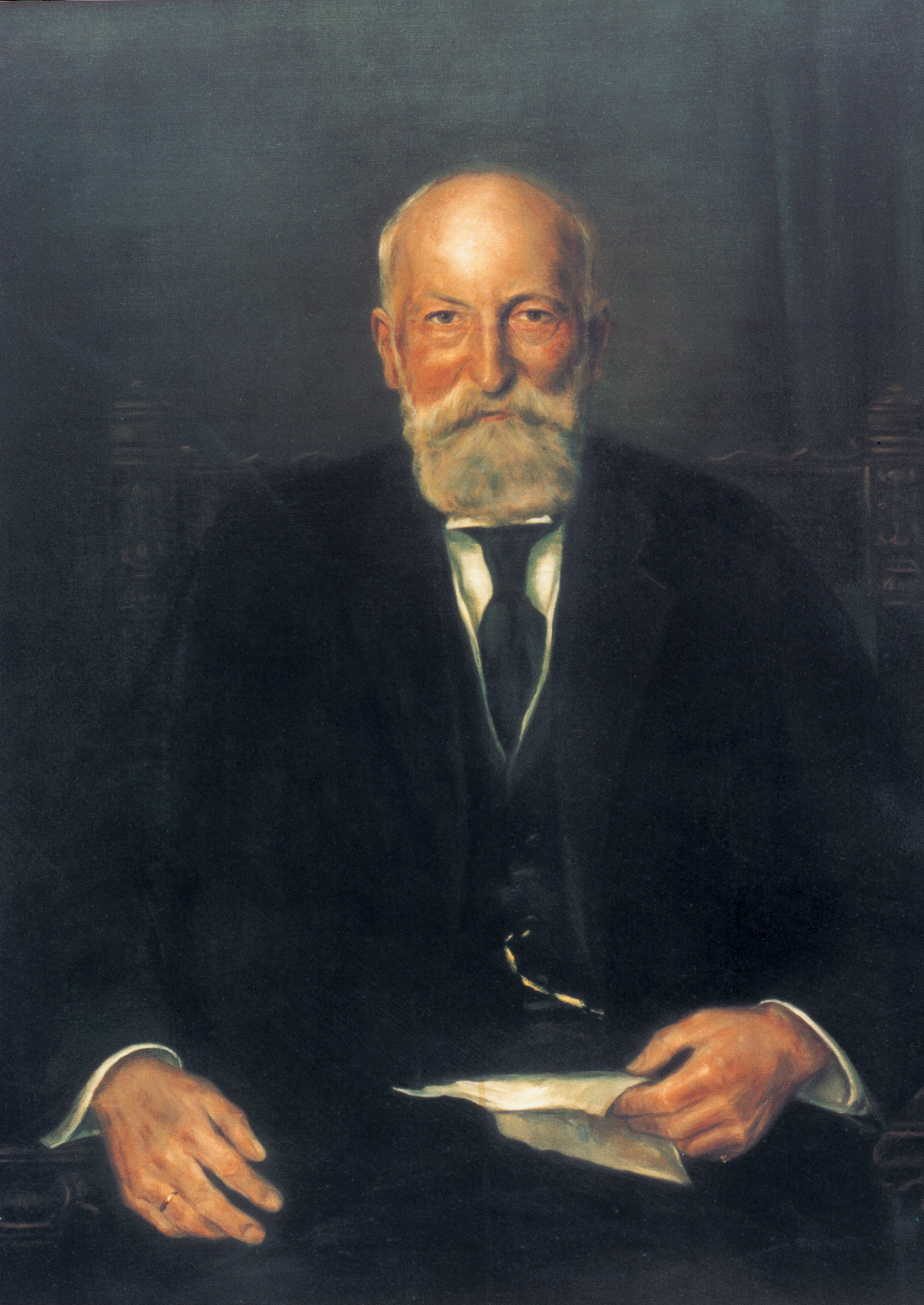
- Born: 11 April 1846
- Died: 18 February 1932 (aged 85)
- Occupations: Industrialist, founder of Rodenstock GmbH

Josef Rodenstock (11 April 1846 – 18 February 1932) was a German industrialist and the founder of Rodenstock, a manufacturer of optical systems.

== Early life ==
Josef Rodenstock was born in Ershausen, in the Prussian Province of Saxony. The eldest son of the "wool comber, master mechanic and merchant" Georg Rodenstock (1819-1894), he was 14 years old when he started selling haberdashery, without trader's or travel's licence, to support his family. He learned soon how to refill damaged tubes of mercury barometers, which he bought from another haberdasher and sold "with some advantage" on his sale trips. He even learned how to make new barometers by himself. So, the family began mass production in the early 1861. They had made the glass tubes in the Thuringian Forest and the dials - printed with the family name Rodenstock - in Würzburg.

== Rodenstock ==
In 1877, he founded the precision workshop "G. Rodenstock" together with his brother Michael in Würzburg. They sold mathematical, physical, and optical instruments, particularly glasses. Josef Rodenstock had already developed the so-called "diaphragm lenses" in the years before settling and started now to sell them and to extend on his ideas.

In 1883, the company was transferred to Munich. According to adverts in the "Fliegende Blätter", Rodenstock already had more than 17 sales outlets in German Empire, Switzerland, Luxembourg, and Bohemia. The business was going so well that two years later Rodenstock purchased property at a side-arm of the River Isar, where the head office of Rodenstock GmbH was located till 2012. His new factory founded in Regen in the Bavarian Forest in 1898 still producing even today. Rodenstock himself died, aged 85, in Erl, Tyrol in the First Republic of Austria.

Alexander Rodenstock (1883-1953), the eldest son of Josef Rodenstock, was not able to complete his study of physics at the Munich Technical University when he received the call of his father to join the company in 1905. The company was as optometrist the imperial warrant of appointment of the German Emperor and King of Prussia Wilhelm II.

== See also ==
- List of German inventors and discoverers
