= Rodenstock GmbH =

German eyewear company

- Type: GmbH
- Industry: Ophthalmic optics
- Founded: 1877
- Founder: Josef Rodenstock
- Headquarters: Munich, Germany
- Key people: Roland Dimbath (COO); Martina Bentele (CFO)
- Revenue: 512.4 million € (2024)
- Number of employees: approx. 4,100 (2025)
- Website: rodenstock.com
- Footnotes; 02 September 2026

Rodenstock GmbH (German pronunciation: [ˈʁoːdn̩ʃtɔk]) is a German manufacturer of optical lenses headquartered in Munich.

== History ==
=== Founding years (1877–1920) ===
The company was founded in Würzburg, Germany by Josef Rodenstock. The precision engineering workshop produced barometers, ophthalmic lenses and frames, scales, and measuring instruments. In 1880, Rodenstock developed his first patented product—the "Diaphragma lenses"—and began exporting it two years later.

In 1883, the company headquarters was moved to Munich, and in 1898, a lens-grinding facility was established in Regen in the Bavarian Forest. In 1886, Rodenstock acquired the grounds at Isartalstraße (today's Dreimühlenviertel). In 1899, Rodenstock produced the first lenses with UV protection.

In 1905, with the entry of Josef’s son Alexander Rodenstock into the business, the entire production operation was moved to Munich. The company also maintained branches in other German cities, including as many as four in Berlin.

In the media, the "Fachanstalt für Augen-Gläser" ("Specialist institute for eye glasses") advertised with the slogan, “If your eyes are nearsighted, go to Rodenstock.” During the Wilhelmine Empire, Josef Rodenstock served as court optician to the German emperor.

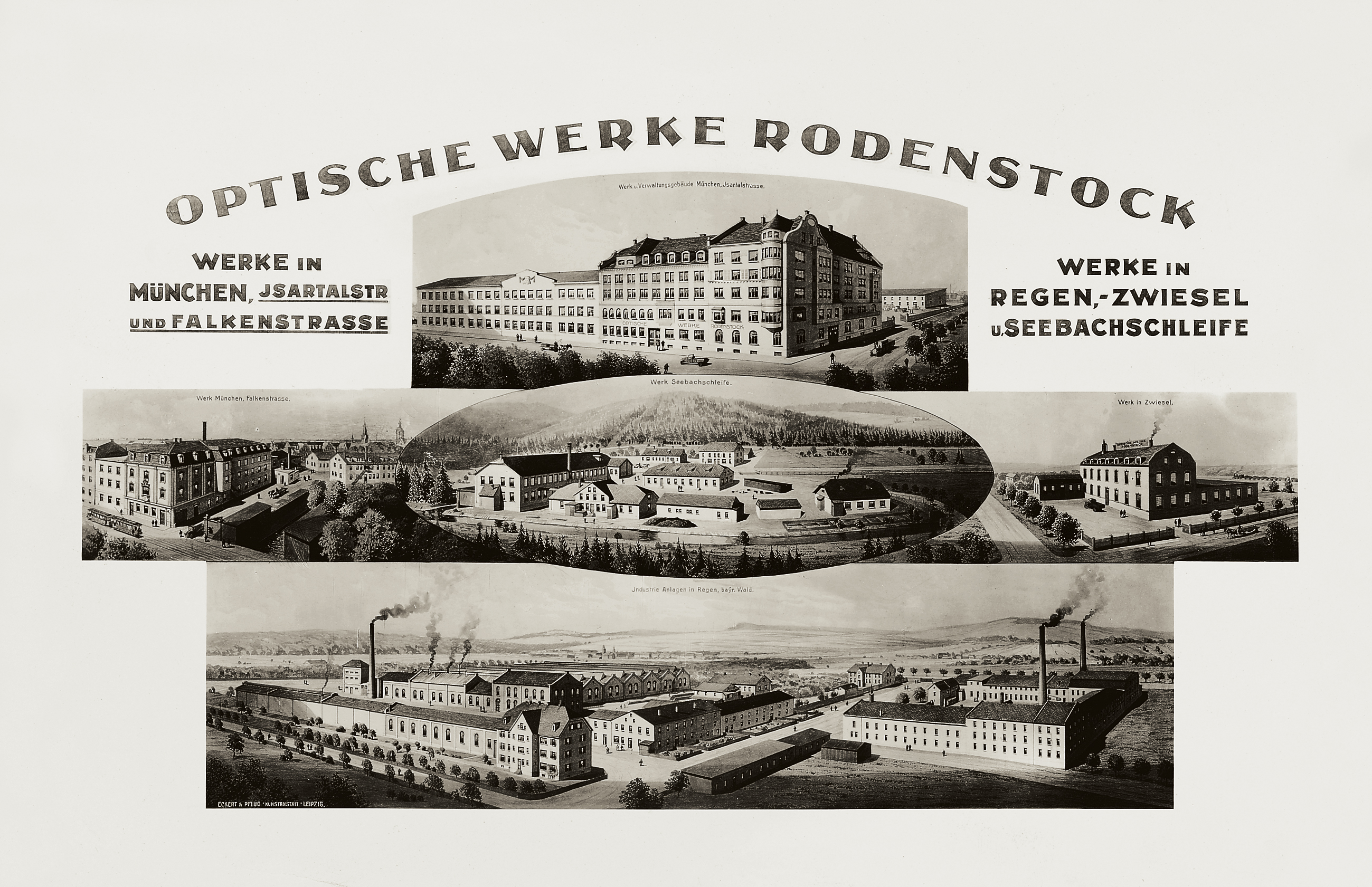
Rodenstock Optics Factory; around 1928

=== Entering camera lens and defence production (1920–1953) ===
In the 1920s, Rodenstock began mass production of camera lenses for a large number of major camera manufacturers. Due to high demand for these lenses, the company stopped production of its own cameras. Between 1930 and 1939, Rodenstock established representatives and offices in all major markets worldwide.

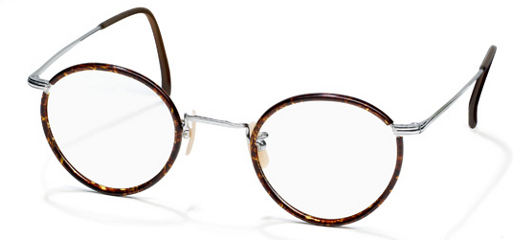
Rodenstock eyewear model from the 1940s

During WWII, Rodenstock manufactured armaments such as binoculars and optical prisms for tanks. The company also continued to manufacture eyeglasses, as those were deemed militarily important and indispensable. After the war, Rodenstock once again focused on its core competencies, particularly the fields of ophthalmic lenses and frames.

=== Large-scale family-run German company (1953–2000) ===
Alexander Rodenstock's son Rolf Rodenstock took over the company in 1953, starting the rise of Rodenstock to a world-renowned major player in the optics industry. Since 1954, the company has increased its investment in public advertising in addition to ads in trade magazines for opticians and ophthalmologists.

In 1955, the company produced 5 million ophthalmic frames. Rodenstock continued to manufacture other optical devices, such as projection lenses for slide projectors (Splendar). In 1968, the company introduced the first photochromatic lenses in Europe, and from 1975 onwards, it produced the first plastic ophthalmic lenses in the world.

Between 1972 and 1983, the network of foreign sales corporations was further expanded. As early as 1950/51, Rolf Rodenstock co-founded the optical precision mechanics factory Industria Optica Rodenstock – Chile S.A; not as a subsidiary of Rodenstock in Germany, but rather as part of a private investment. Only later did Optische Werke G. Rodenstock KG gradually take over the Chilean manufacturer. It has been the market leader in the field of ophthalmic lenses and frames in Chile ever since. In 1983, Randolf Rodenstock joined the group of shareholders at Optische Werke G. Rodenstock as a personally liable partner (general partner), leading the company together with his father Rolf Rodenstock.

In 1989, Rodenstock shifted the majority of its Munich production capabilities to its newly established serial production facilities in Thailand, and its production facilities in Ebersberg were moved to Malta. Between 1988 and 1989, revenues decreased by 10% from its previous €700 million. 1991 saw the introduction of the R logo and trademark.

In Klatovy (Czech Republic), the company built a new plant for prescription lenses in 1995–1996. In 2000, the Precision Optics division (manufacturing lenses for analog view cameras, known under brand names such as Sironar, Apo-Ronar, Grandagon), enlargers (e.g., the Rodagon), and digital view cameras with high-resolution digital backs (e.g., the Apo-Sironar digital, introduced in 1997) to Linos AG in Göttingen.

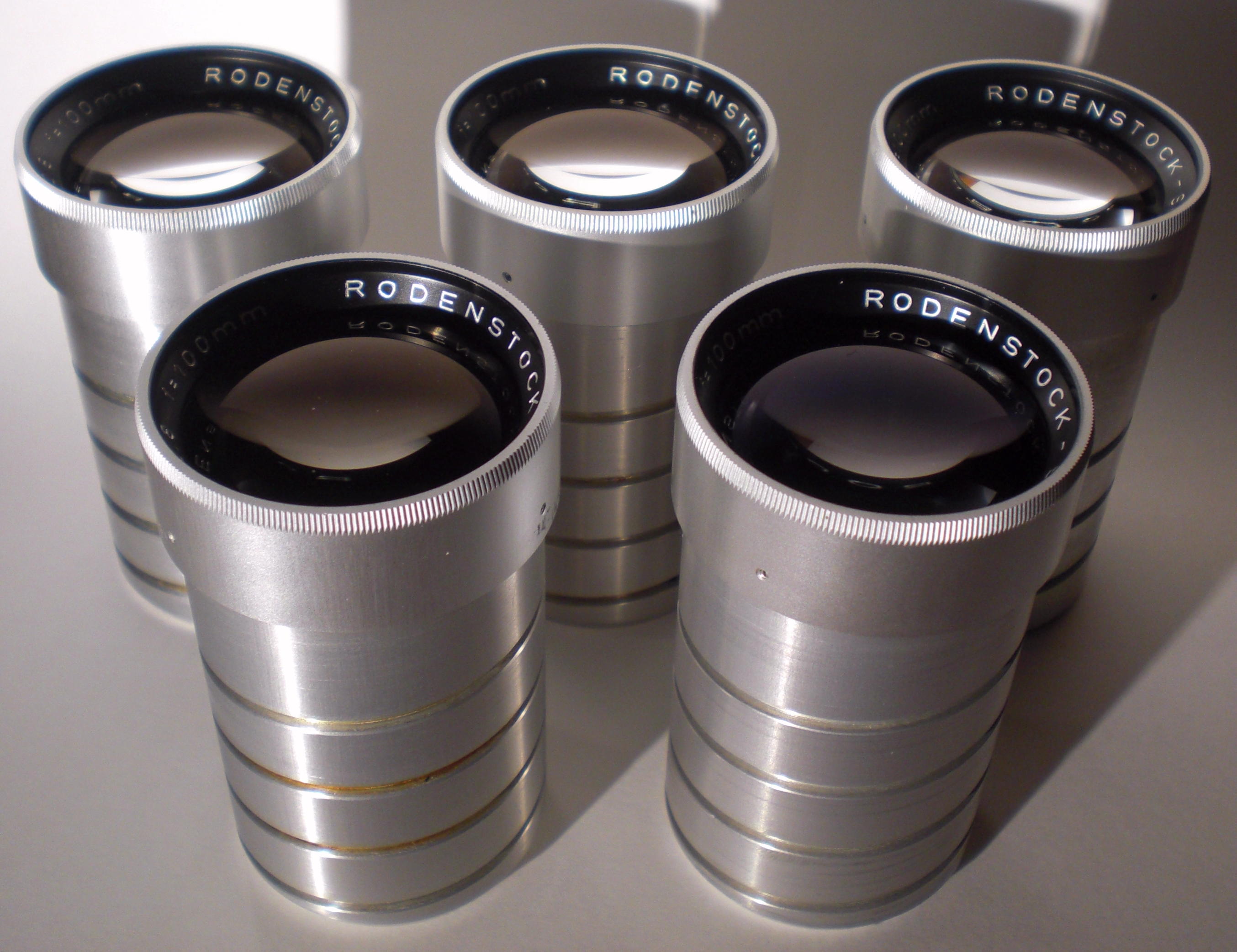
Rodenstock Splendar lenses from the 1960s

=== 2000–2010 ===
In 2002, the Eyewear Division was spun off to form the new company Rodenstock GmbH. Business difficulties in the U.S. led to a severe corporate crisis in 2003. That same year, the private equity firm Permira acquired a 49% stake in Rodenstock. In 2004, Permira increased its stake in Rodenstock to 85%, while the Rodenstock family retained a 10% stake. A comprehensive restructuring was initiated in partnership with Permira.

In 2006, Permira sold its 85% stake in Rodenstock to the private equity firm Bridgepoint Capital; the Rodenstock family also sold the remaining 10% of its shares to Bridgepoint in 2007. Bridgepoint thus held a 95% stake in Rodenstock.

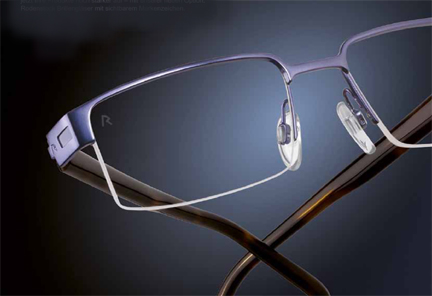
Spectacles featuring the Rodenstock logo on the lens

=== Since 2010 ===
In 2012, Eye Lens Technology introduced a lens to the market that takes into account accommodative astigmatism and Listing’s law for near vision and calculates physiologically correct near refraction values, thereby allowing the wearer to achieve optimal visual acuity.

In May 2012, after 126 years on the banks of the Isar, Rodenstock relocated to Munich-Laim.

In 2015, Bridgepoint Capital sold its shares to the private equity firm Compass Partners.

In 2020, a new technology was introduced that measures the eye at thousands of data points to produce biometric lenses.

In 2021, the private equity firm Apax Partners announced the acquisition of the Rodenstock Group.

In 2022, Rodenstock introduced lenses powered by artificial intelligence.

In 2023, Rodenstock sold its eyeglass frame business to De Rigo, thereby focusing its future efforts on the manufacture of lenses. The sale also included the marketing of the Porsche Design licensed brand.

== Current product portfolio ==
Currently (as of 2026), the company is engaged in the development, manufacture, and sale of progressive, sunglass, sports, reading, computer, driving, and children’s lenses.

The product line includes single-vision lenses, progressive lenses, near-vision comfort lenses, as well as tinted lenses and photochromic lenses.

== Corporate Structure ==
The Rodenstock Group includes several brands both in Germany and abroad. In addition to the main brand, Rodenstock, the group also includes the brands optovision and Indo Optical. The Rodenstock Group is represented in more than 85 countries worldwide through sales subsidiaries and distribution partners. Rodenstock operates five central production facilities to ensure global availability.
