= List of Japanese photographers =

This is a list of notable Japanese photographers in alphabetical order by last name. Names on this list are presented in Western name order, with given name first and family name second.

== A-C ==
- Tadasuke Akiyama
- Takashi Amano
- Nobuyoshi Araki
- Taku Aramasa
- Taiji Arita
- Masanori Ashida
- Ōno Benkichi
- Teisuke Chiba
- Yasuyoshi Chiba

== D-F ==
- Ken Domon
- Ei-Q
- T. Enami
- Hakuyō Fuchikami
- Atsushi Fujiwara
- Mitsutarō Fuku
- Katsuji Fukuda
- Rosō Fukuhara
- Shinzō Fukuhara
- Narutoshi Furukawa

== G-J ==
- Masao Gozu
- Kanbei Hanaya
- Hisaji Hara
- Mikiko Hara
- Fuyuki Hattori
- Osamu Hayasaki
- Tadahiko Hayashi
- Takanobu Hayashi
- Terushichi Hirai
- Horie Kuwajirō
- Masao Horino
- Tetsuya Ichimura
- Seiryū Inoue
- Taikichi Irie
- Ryuichi Ishikawa
- Kei Ito
- Yoshihiko Itō
- Mitsuaki Iwagō
- Takeji Iwamiya
- Bishin Jumonji

== K ==
- Tokujirō Kameya
- Mari Katayama
- Rinko Kawauchi
- Seiki Kayamori
- Kensuke Kazama
- Takashi Kijima
- Hiroh Kikai
- Shunkichi Kikuchi
- Ihei Kimura
- Katué Kitasono
- Genzō Kitazumi
- Meison Kobayashi
- Shinichiro Kobayashi
- Fusako Kodama
- Naonori Kohira
- Kiyoshi Koishi
- Ryūa Kojima
- Akira Komoto
- Tomio Kondō
- Asahachi Kōno
- Motoichi Kumagai
- Seiji Kurata
- Kusakabe Kimbei
- Kineo Kuwabara
- Shisei Kuwabara

== M-O ==
- Genzō Maeda
- Shinzo Maeda
- Susumu Matsushima
- Minoru Minami
- Tōyō Miyatake
- Yūhi Miyazaki
- Aizō Morikawa
- Daidō Moriyama
- Shigeichi Nagano
- Yasushi Nagao
- Katsu Naito
- Masatoshi Naitō
- Osamu James Nakagawa
- Ikkō Narahara
- Yōnosuke Natori
- Kiyoshi Nishiyama
- Tohru Nogami
- Kazumasa Ogawa
- Seiyo Ogawa
- Yoshino Ōishi
- Kosuke Okahara
- Takashi Okamura
- Kōshirō Onchi
- Mitsugu Ōnishi
- Chizu Ono
- Kei Orihara

== S ==
- Akira Satō
- Kōji Satō
- Tokihiro Satō
- Masato Seto
- Noriyoshi Shibata
- Bukō Shimizu
- Tōkoku Shimizu
- Kishin Shinoyama
- Mieko Shiomi
- Issei Suda
- Hiroshi Sugimoto
- Yoshiyasu Suzuka

== T ==
- Minayoshi Takada
- Kaietsu Takagi
- Tadashi Takamura
- Yutaka Takanashi
- Masataka Takayama
- Kenzō Tamoto
- Kozaburō Tamamura
- Akihide Tamura
- Sakae Tamura
- Sakae Tamura
- Shigeru Tamura
- Kōtarō Tanaka
- Manji Terashima
- Toyoko Tokiwa
- Shōmei Tōmatsu
- Rihei Tomishige
- Akira Toriyama
- Akito Tsuda

== U-Y ==
- Kuichi Uchida
- Shōji Ueda
- Noboru Ueki
- Hikoma Ueno
- Gyokusen Ukai
- Kaoru Usui
- Ōri Umesaka
- Hiroshi Watanabe
- Hitomi Watanabe
- Kansuke Yamamoto
- Sakiko Yamaoka
- Hiroshi Yamazaki
- Nakaji Yasui
- Matsusaburō Yokoyama
- Tomizo Yoshikawa
- Kohei Yoshiyuki

== See also ==
- List of Japanese artists
- List of Japanese women photographers
- History of photography in Japan
