= Sutezo Otono =

Japanese photographer (1905–1988)

Sutezo Otono (音納 捨三)
- Born: August 3, 1905; Osaka City, Osaka Prefecture, Japan
- Died: 1988 (aged 82–83)
- Occupation: Photographer
- Organization: Tampei Photography Club

Sutezo Otono (音納 捨三, Otono Sutezō) (3 August 1905 – 1988) was a Japanese photographer noted for his photograms and work in other techniques that were avant-garde at the time.

Otono was born in 1905 in Osaka. After graduating from Osaka City Public East Commercial High School, he started working at the Yamaguchi Bank. In 1930, he began to participate in activities of the Tampei Photography Club and Zen Kansai Shashin Remei (All Kansai Photography Association"). He received numerous awards from the Nippon Dai Shashin Salon ("Japan Grand Photography Salon Competition").

A curator of the Tokyo Metropolitan Museum of Photography, Akiko Okatsuka, notes that “Otono Sutezo and Ei-Q stand out among the many Japanese photographers who explored the possibilities of the photogram technique.” Otono worked with these avant-garde photography techniques before World War II. His photographic subjects included plants and other living creatures. He also contributed articles on the subject of the photogram techniques to magazines such as Camera Club and Shashin Bunka ("Photography Culture"). Okatsuka expands on Otono's impact on the legacy of amateur photography clubs that would develop later in the Kansai area:

As the Showa era began, photographers became interested in techniques that made use of the distinctive characteristics of the photograph – photomontage, photograms, and infrared photography, for instance. A steady stream of experimental photographs with new content appeared... Three [photographers] who deserve special note were NAKAYAMA Iwata, OTONO Sutezo and KOISHI Kiyoshi. The foundation on which they build their vast bodies of work were the amateur photographers’ clubs found throughout the country, such as the Naniwa Shashin Club, the Tampei Shashin Club and the Ashiya Camera Club in the Kansai...

His works have been shown internationally at Paris Photo and are included in the permanent collection of the New Orleans Museum of Art.

== Exhibitions ==
- 1995: The Founding and Development of Modern Photography in Japan, Tokyo Metropolitan Museum of Photography
- 2018: Past Present Future: Building Photography at the New Orleans Museum of Art, New Orleans Museum of Art
- 2022: Avant-Garde Rising - The Photographic Vanguard in Modern Japan, Tokyo Photographic Art Museum
