= Tōru Kōno =

Japanese photographer

Toro Kono
- Born: 1907 August 29; Osaka City, Japan
- Died: 1984 April 19
- Occupation: Photographer
- Organization: Tampei Photography Club Democratic Artists Association Spiegel Photography Association

Tōru Kōno (河野 徹, Kōno Tōru; 1907–1984) was a Japanese photographer. He was born on August 29 in Tenoji district in Osaka City, Japan.

He graduated the Yao City Public Secondary School in 1927. It was around that time that he started to take landscape and still-life photographs.

In 1929, he joined the Nadaya Camera Club and developed further as a photographer under the tutelage of Morimoto Kiyokata who was a member of the Naniwa Photography Club.

== Tampei Photography Club ==
Kōno becomes a member of the Tampei Photography Club in 1931 through the introduction of Seiichiro Tokuda. There he is influenced by Nakaji Yasui and Bizan Ueda. Takeji Iwamiya wrote about an episode when he and Kōno were on an outdoor photo session hosted by the Tampei Photography Club in an essay that was included in Kōno's self-published photobook, titled Wadachi - The Works of Kōno Tōru. Iwamiya was one of the younger members of the club and he describes his timidity as he watched as the seniors members went about the park taking photographs enthusiastically. But Iwamiya says that Kōno made a deep impression on him. While the other members were taking pictures in earnest, Kōno casually strolled about and stood next to Iwamiya and haphazardly took a few pictures of some dead grass and was the first to leave the photo session. Iwamiya said he was shocked when he saw the final photo and how Kōno was able to bring such life to such dead grass.

There was an underlying sense of solidarity, evident through joint photographic production projects, amongst photographers in the various photo clubs sprouting up around the country at this time. One such example of such collaboration was when six photographers of the Tampei Photography Club came together in 1941 to photograph Jewish refugees who had escaped to Kobe from Nazi persecution in Eastern Europe. Many of these refugees who were photographed were given visas out of Lithuania by Chiuna Sugihara. The project was titled The Wandering Jews and was published at the 23rd exhibition of the Tampei Photography Club. Kōno's interwar work was later revisited in the Osaka section of the Tokyo Photographic Art Museum exhibition Avant-Garde Rising: The Photographic Vanguard in Modern Japan, which included him among the photographers representing the Kansai avant-garde. It was headed by Yasui Nakaji; other members included Kono, Kametaro Kawasaki, Tabuchi Kaneyoshi, Yutaka Tezuka, and Osamu Shiihara.

== Democratic Artists Association ==
In 1951, Kōno participates in the formation of the Democratic Artists Association with Ei-Q. Other members at the time included Kei Mori, Shigeru Izumi, Yoshio Hayakawa, Shisui Tanahashi, Toshiji Yoshida, Morio Gunji, Kohei Uchida, and Hisashi Toyama. Kōno and Tanahashi exhibited their works at the First Democratic Art Exhibition in Osaka in June 1951. A few months later the Second Democratic Art Exhibition in Osaka was held in August of the same year. In March 1952 the organization held their first exhibition in Tokyo, titled First Democratic Art Exhibition in Tokyo.

In 1952, Kōno participated in an exhibition with other Tampei Photography Club members in Matsushima Gallery on the second floor of the Ginza Matsushima Eyeglass Store. The Eight Person Tampei Exhibition included Shisui Tanahashi, Takeji Iwamiya, Katsumasa Kimura, Gyokai Sahoyama, Hatsutaro Horiuchi, Ikko Wada, and Mizuo Tamai.

== Spiegel Photographers Association ==
But in the same year, after 21 years, he quits the Tampei Photography Club and leaves the Democratic Art's Association a year later in 1953. In the same year, he creates a new organization called the Spiegel Photography Association with Shisui Tanahashi and Katsumasa Kimura. He also establishes Kono Studio in Osaka City. He died on April 19, 1984.

His works have been exhibited at the Nakanoshima Museum of Art, Osaka and the Tokyo Photographic Art Museum
