= Irie Taikichi Memorial Museum of Photography Nara City =

- 入江泰吉記念奈良市写真美術館
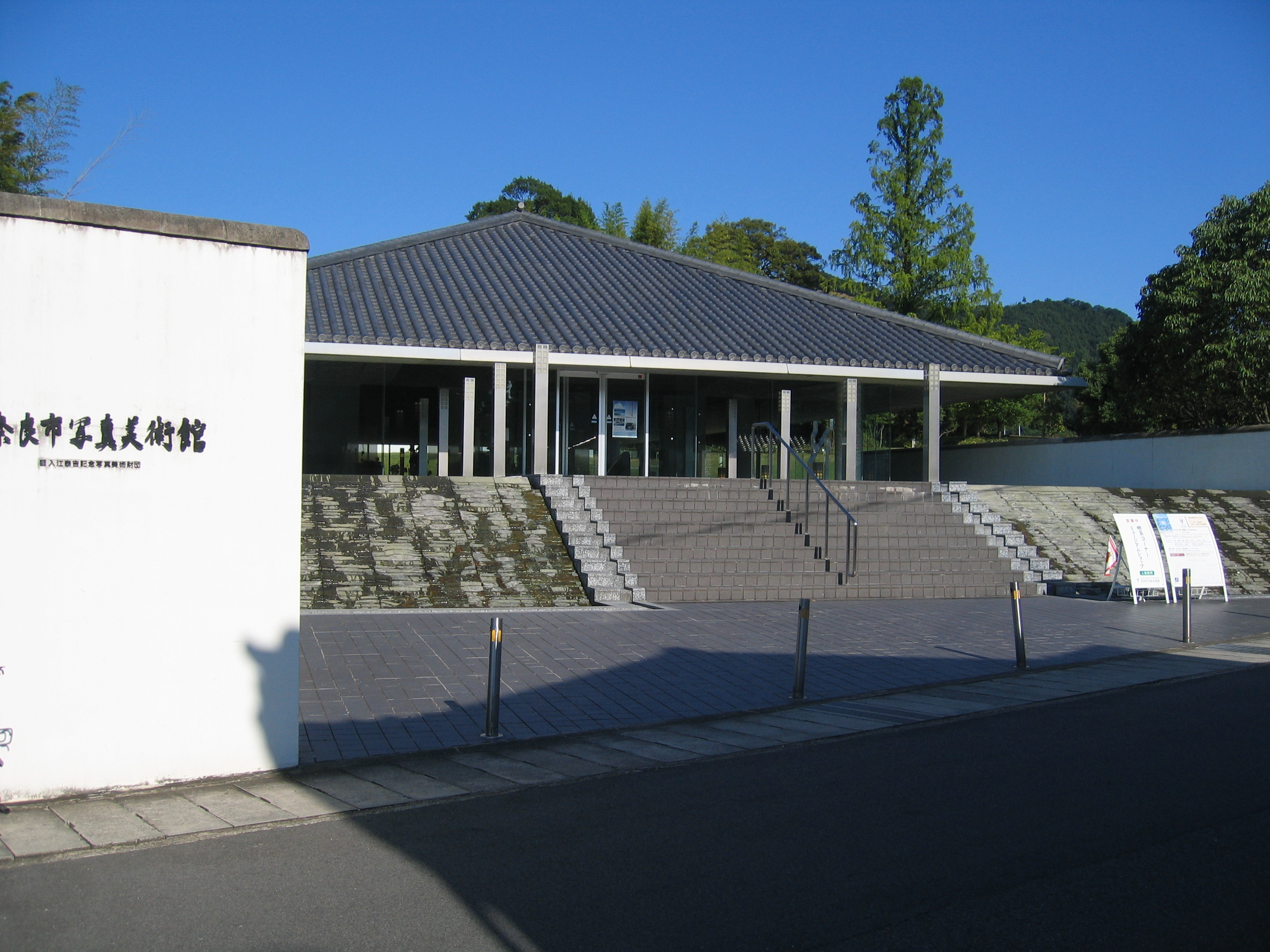
- Interactive map of the Irie Taikichi Memorial Museum of Photography Nara City area

General information
- Location: 600-1 Takabatake-chō, Nara, Nara Prefecture, Japan
- Coordinates: 34°40′32″N 135°50′44″E
- Opened: April 1992

Technical details
- Floor count: 2 (ground floor and basement)
- Floor area: 2,300 m^{2}

Design and construction
- Architect: Kishō Kurokawa

Website
- Official website

Irie Taikichi Memorial Museum of Photography Nara City (入江泰吉記念奈良市写真美術館, Irie Taikichi Kinen Nara-shi Shashin Bijutsukan) opened in Nara, Japan, in 1992. Located near Shin-Yakushi-ji and designed by Kishō Kurokawa, the Museum was formerly known as the Nara City Museum of Photography (奈良市写真美術館). The collection includes the complete oeuvre of Irie Taikichi (1905 – 1992), some 80,000 works; a set of 1,025 Meiji and Taishō glass plates by Kudō Risaburō (工藤利三郎) (1848 – 1929) that are a Registered Tangible Cultural Property; and photographs by Tsuda Yoho (津田洋甫) (1923 – 2014).

== See also ==
- List of museums devoted to one photographer
- Nara National Museum
- Ken Domon Museum of Photography
- Seiyō Ogawa
