= Tsuda (surname) =

Tsuda (written: 津田) is a Japanese surname. Notable people with the surname include:

- Akito Tsuda (津田 明人, born 1966), Japanese photographer
- Bungo Tsuda (津田 文吾, 1918–2007), Japanese politician
- Daisuke Tsuda (disambiguation), multiple people
- Hiromichi Tsuda (津田 洋道), Japanese basketball coach
- Itsuo Tsuda (津田 逸夫, 1914–1984), Japanese philosopher and aikidoka
- Kanji Tsuda (津田 寛治, born 1965), Japanese actor
- Kazuki Tsuda (津田 和樹, born 1982), Japanese footballer
- Kenjiro Tsuda (津田 健次郎, born 1971), Japanese voice actor and actor
- Kentaro Tsuda (津田 健太朗, born 1983), Japanese freestyle skier
- Tsuda Mamichi (津田 真道, 1829–1903), Japanese statesman and legal scholar
- Masami Tsuda (津田 雅美, born 1970), Japanese manga artist
- Mikiyo Tsuda (つだ みきよ), Japanese manga artist
- Minami Tsuda (津田 美波, born 1989), Japanese voice actress
- Tsuda Nobuzumi (津田 信澄, 1555–1582), Japanese samurai
- Tsuda Sanzō (津田 三蔵, 1855–1891), Japanese police officer and failed assassin
- Seiichiro Tsuda (津田 晴一郎, 1906–1991), Japanese long-distance runner
- Tsuda Sen (津田 仙, 1837–1908), Japanese politician, educator and writer
- Shōko Tsuda (津田 匠子, born 1963), Japanese actress and voice actress
- Tsuda Sōgyū (津田 宗及, died 1591), Japanese tea master
- Takuma Tsuda (津田 琢磨, born 1980), Japanese footballer
- Takuya Tsuda (津田 拓也, born 1984), Japanese motorcycle racer
- Tomohiro Tsuda (津田 知宏, born 1986), Japanese footballer
- Tsunemi Tsuda (津田 恒実, 1960–1993), Japanese baseball player
- Tsuda Umeko (津田 梅子, 1864–1929), Japanese educator, founder of Tsuda University
- Yataro Tsuda (津田 弥太郎, born 1952), Japanese politician
- Yoho Tsuda (津田 洋甫, 1923–2014), Japanese photographer
- Yukio Tsuda (disambiguation), multiple people
