= Shigi =

Shigi or 信貴 could refer to:

== People ==
- Hisaji Shigi, Japanese businessperson
- Yoshinori Shigi (born 1961), Japanese politician
- Shigi Qutuqu (Mongolian: ᠰᠢᠭᠢᠬᠤᠲᠤᠭ; c. 1178 – 1260), Mongol Empire official

== Other uses ==
- Mount Shigi, a mountain in Ikoma District, Japan
- Shigi Line, a railway line in Yao, Japan
