= Takagi =

Takagi (高木) is a Japanese surname meaning "tall tree". Notable people with the surname include:

- Akimitsu Takagi (1920–1995), Japanese crime fiction writer
- Jon Mamoru Takagi (1942–1984), American martial arts instructor
- Hikari Takagi (高木 ひかり; born 1993), Japanese footballer
- Hinako Takagi (born 1989), Japanese composer and pianist
- Hitoshi Takagi (1925–2004), Japanese voice actor
- Isao Takagi (高木 功; born 1961), Japanese professional wrestler
- Kaietsu Takagi (1883–1957), Japanese photographer
- Kazumichi Takagi (born 1980), Japanese football player
- Keizō Takagi (born 1941), Japanese writer, journalist and educator
- Kunito Takagi (高木 邦人; born 1934), Japanese ice hockey player
- Maria Takagi (born 1978), Japanese former AV star and TV actress
- Takagi Masao (高木 正雄), the Japanese name of South Korean president Park Chung-hee (1917–1979)
- Miho Takagi (born 1994), Japanese speed skater
- Mototeru Takagi (1941–2002), Japanese free jazz musician
- Nana Takagi (born 1992), Japanese speed skater
- Paul Takagi (1923–2015), American sociologist
- Sadao Takagi (born 1932), Japanese entomologist
- Saya Takagi (born 1963), Japanese actress
- Shingo Takagi (鷹木 信悟; born 1982), Japanese professional wrestler
- Tadashi Takagi (高木 規; born 1970), Japanese professional wrestler and promoter known as Sanshiro Takagi
- Takeo Takagi (1882–1944), Japanese vice admiral in World War II
- Takuya Takagi, Japanese football player and football manager
- Teiji Takagi (1875–1960), Japanese mathematician
- Toranosuke Takagi (born 1974), Japanese race car driver
- Wataru Takagi (born 1966), Japanese voice actor

== Fictional characters ==
- Takagi (高木), titular character of the manga series Teasing Master Takagi-san
- Satoru Takagi (高木 悟), a character in the manga series Tomie
- Akito Takagi (高木 秋人), a character in the manga series Bakuman
- Saya Takagi (高城 沙耶), a character in the manga series Highschool of the Dead
- Joseph Takagi, head executive of the Nakatomi Corporation in Die Hard (1988)
