= Hisaji =

Hisaji (Japanese: 久治) is a Japanese given name. Notable people with the name include:

- Hisaji Hara (born 1964), Japanese photographer
- Hisaji Shigi (fl. mid to late 20th century), Japanese businessperson
