= Shōsuke Sekioka =

Japanese photographer (1928–2016)

Shōsuke Sekioka (関岡昭介, 1928–2016) was a Japanese photographer and member of the Naniwa Photography Club. Sekioka joined the club in 1958, after it resumed activities after WWII. Founded in Osaka in 1904, the Naniwa Photography Club had been an important center of Shinkō Shashin in the Kansai region before the war, with members including Nakaji Yasui and Kiyoshi Koishi.

Photography Critic Kōtarō Iizawa discussed Sekioka’s work in the context of the diversity of Japanese photography during the 1950s. Sekioka’s works range from photographs addressing social subjects to more abstract images characterized by formal and technical experimentation. Iizawa identifies works such as Black Mountain (黒い山)as reflecting the unsettled atmosphere of postwar Japan.

Sekioka continued to exhibit photography in later decades. In 1982, he presented the black-and-white series Doro no kawa (泥の河, Muddy River). This was a further development of a theme he had previously explored. 50 photographs from the series were exhibited at the Ginza Nikon Salon and Osaka Nikon Salon in 2011.

Sekioka’s photographs are held in the collections of the Tokyo Photographic Art Museum Collection and the J. Paul Getty Museum
