= Nogami =

Nogami (野上) is a Japanese surname. Notable people with the surname include:

- Akira Nogami (born 1966), Japanese professional wrestler and actor
- Hisashi Nogami (born 1971) Japanese video game designer, director and producer
- Keiko Nogami (runner) (野上 恵子; born 1985), Japanese long-distance runner
- Keiko Nogami (sailor) (野上 敬子; born 1947), Japanese sailor
- Nogami Tohru (born 1935), Japanese photographer
- Ryoma Nogami (born 1987), Nippon Professional Baseball pitcher
- Takao Nogami (born 1971), Japanese professional golfer
- Teruyo Nogami (born 1927), Japanese screenwriter
- Yaeko Nogami (1885–1985), Japanese novelist
- Yoshiji Nogami (born 1942), Japanese diplomat
- Yukana Nogami (born 1975), Japanese voice actress and singer
- Yuki Nogami (born 1991), Japanese football player

Fictional characters:

- Ryotaro Nogami, Kotaro Nogami and Airi Nogami, characters in Kamen Rider Den-O
- Saeko Nogami, character in the anime and manga series City Hunter

Nogami (野上; [nò̞.ɡä́.mʲí, -ŋä́-]) is also a slang name for Ueno (上野; [ɯ̈̀.é̞.nó̞]), based on its anagram.

== See also ==
- Nogami Station
