= Noriyoshi =

- Gender: Male

Origin
- Origin: Japanese
- Meaning: Different meanings depending on the kanji used

Noriyoshi (written: 宣福, 典良, 規勝 or のりよし in hiragana) is a masculine Japanese given name. Notable people with the name include:

- Noriyoshi Ohba (大場 規勝) (born 1963), Japanese video game designer and producer
- Noriyoshi Omichi (大道 典良) (born 1969), Japanese baseball player
- Noriyoshi Sakai (酒井 宣福) (born 1992), Japanese footballer
- Noriyoshi Shibata (柴田 のりよし) (born 1966), Japanese photographer
