= Tomio =

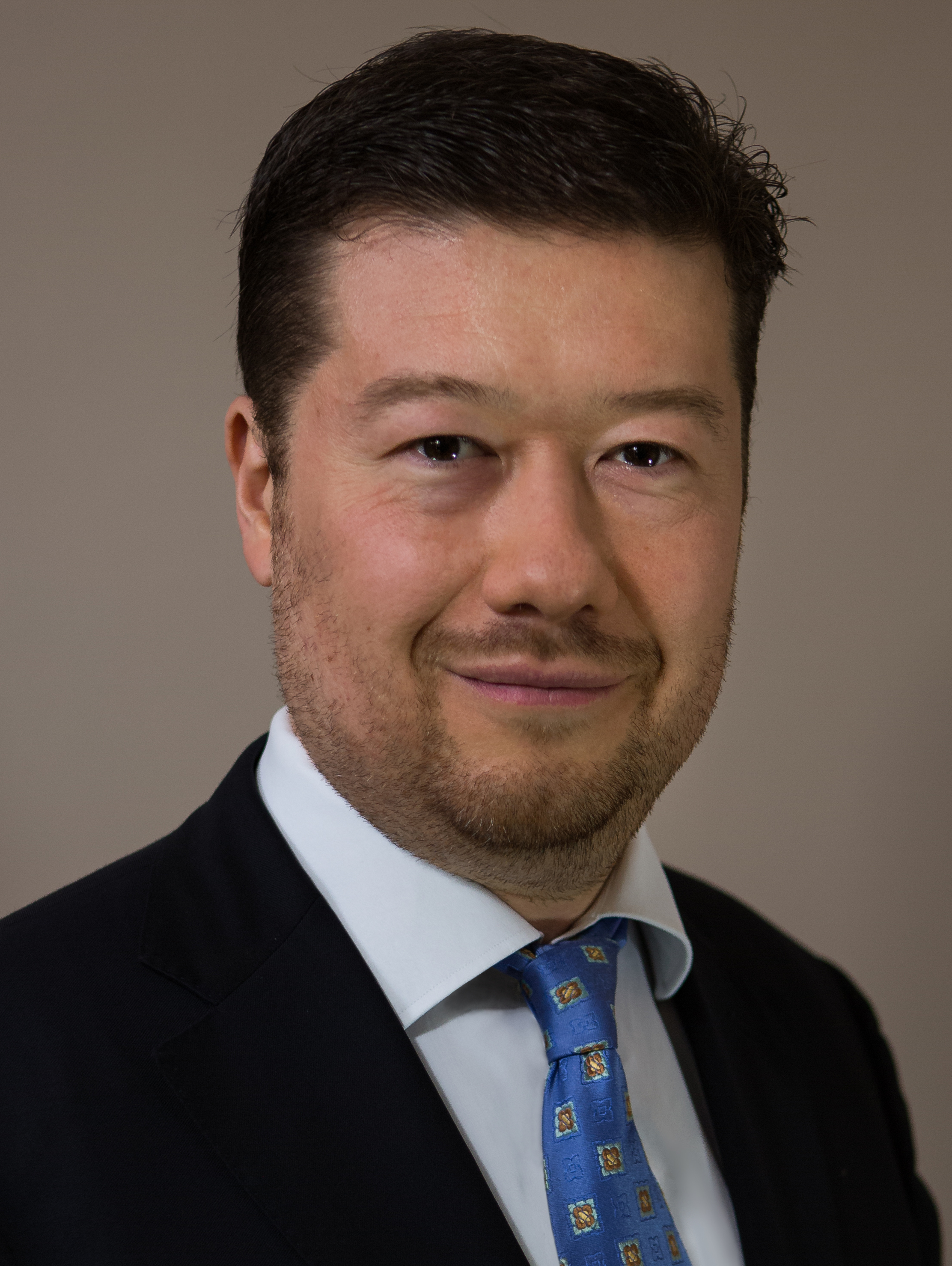
- Tomio Okamura, Czech-Japanese politician and entrepreneur
- Pronunciation: tomio (IPA)
- Gender: Male

Origin
- Origin: Japanese
- Meaning: Different meanings depending on the kanji used

Other names
- Alternative spelling: Tomio (Kunrei-shiki) Tomio (Nihon-shiki) Tomio (Hepburn)

Tomio is a masculine Japanese given name.

== Written forms ==
Tomio can be written using different combinations of Kanji characters. Some examples:

- 富雄, "enrich, masculine"
- 富男, "enrich, man"
- 富夫, "enrich, husband"
- 冨雄, "enrich, masculine"
- 冨男, "enrich, man"
- 冨夫, "enrich, husband"
- 斗巳雄, "Big Dipper, a sign of the snake (Chinese zodiac), masculine"

The name can also be written in hiragana とみお or katakana トミオ.

== Notable people with the name ==
- Tomio Aoki (青木 富夫; 1923–2004), Japanese film actor
- Tomio Fujii (藤井 富雄; 1924–2021), Japanese politician
- Tomio Hora (洞 富雄; 1906–2000), Japanese historian
- Tomio Hosoda (細田 富男; 1926–2008), Japanese sprinter
- Tomio Imamura (今村 富雄; born 1958), Japanese karateka
- Tomio Kondō (近藤 福雄; 1900–1957), Japanese photographer
- Tomio Koyanagi (小柳 富男; born 1916), Japanese diver
- Tomio Kubota (久保田 富雄; 1930–2020), Japanese mathematician
- Tomio Mizokami (溝上 富夫; born 1948), Japanese professor at Osaka University
- Tomio Fukuoka (福岡 富雄; born 1936), Japanese educator
- Tomio Moriguchi (森口 富雄; born 1936), American businessman
- Tomio Murai (村井 富雄; born 1948), Japanese rower
- Tomio Okamura (岡村 富夫; born 1972), Czech-Japanese politician and entrepreneur
- Tomio Okamura (cross-country skier) (岡村 富雄; born 1948), Japanese cross-country skier
- Tomio Ota (太田 富夫; born 1936), Japanese triple jumper
- Tomio Otani (太田 富夫; born 1939), British kendo master
- Tomio Sasaki (佐々木 富雄; born 1945), Japanese alpine skier
- Tomio Sumimoto (隅本 富夫; born 1945), Japanese sprint canoer
- Tomio Tashiro (田代 富雄; born 1954), Japanese baseball player
- Tomio Yamazaki (山崎 富美雄; born 1947), Japanese ice hockey player

== Places ==
- Tomio Building and Tomio Department Store, Little Tokyo, Los Angeles

== See also ==
- Tomio Station, a railway station in Nara Prefecture, Japan
