= Tsuda =

Tsuda may refer to:

- Tsuda (surname), a Japanese surname
- Tsuda, Kagawa, a former town in Ōkawa District, Kagawa Prefecture, Japan
- Tsuda Station, a railway station in Hirakata, Osaka Prefecture, Japan
- Tsuda University, a university in Kodaira, Tokyo, Japan
- 79254 Tsuda, a main-belt asteroid
