= Kawaguchi Museum of Art =

Art museum in Kawaguchi, Saitama, Japan

- 川口市立美術館
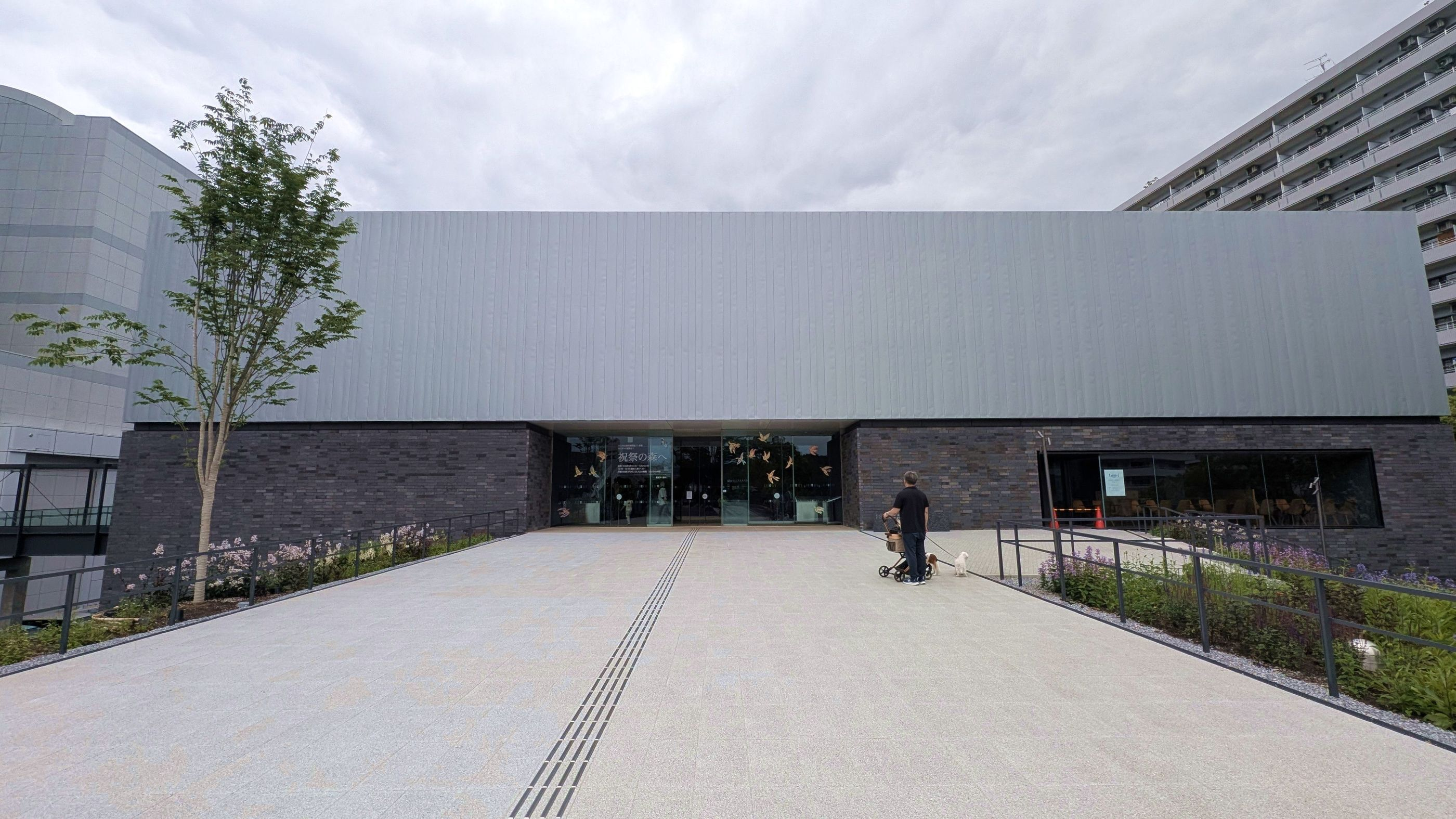
- Interactive map of the Kawaguchi Museum of Art area

General information
- Location: 3-1-2 Kawaguchi, Kawaguchi, Saitama Prefecture, Japan
- Coordinates: 35°48′04″N 139°43′00″E
- Opening: September 2026

Website
- Official website

Kawaguchi Museum of Art (川口市立美術館, Kawaguchi Shiritsu Bijutsukan) is scheduled to open in Kawaguchi, Saitama Prefecture, Japan, in September 2026. The collection, numbering some 220 items as of January 2026, includes works by Yokoyama Taikan, Kaburaki Kiyokata, and Nushi Shōichirō.

== See also ==
- Museum of Modern Art, Saitama
