= Akito =

Akito is a masculine Japanese given name. Notable people with the name include:

- Akito Arima (有馬 朗人) (1930–2020), Japanese nuclear physicist
- Akito Fukumori (福森 晃斗) (born 1992), Japanese footballer
- Akito Fukuta (福田 晃斗; born 1992), Japanese footballer
- Akito Hirose (born 1999), Canadian ice hockey player
- Akito Y. Kawahara, American-Japanese entomologist, scientist, and nature education advocate
- Akito Kawamoto (河本 明人; born 1990), Japanese footballer
- Akito Miura (三浦 旭人) (born 1987), Japanese footballer
- Akito Nakatsuka (中塚 章人), Japanese video game composer and sound director
- Akito Nishigaki (西垣 彰人) (born 1987), Japanese professional wrestler
- Akito Ōkura (大藏彰人; born 1994), Japanese baseball pitcher
- Akito Suzuki (鈴木 章斗; born 2003), Japanese footballer
- Akito Tachibana (橘 章斗) (born 1988), Japanese footballer
- Akito Takabe (髙部瑛斗; born 1997), Japanese baseball player
- Akito Takagi (髙木 彰人; born 1997), Japanese footballer
- Akito Tsuda (津田 明人; born 1966), Japanese photographer
- Akito Watabe (渡部 暁斗) (born 1988), Japanese Nordic combined skier
- Akito Willett (born 1988), Nevisian cricketer

Fictional characters:

- Akito Hayama, a main character in Kodomo no Omocha
- Akito Himenokōji, main character in the light novel and anime series OniAi
- Akito Hiyama, a character in the Vocaloid band, ICE MOUNTAIN
- Akito Hyuga, the main character of Code Geass: Akito the Exiled
- Akito Saeki, a character in the video game Generation Xth
- Akito Shinonome (東雲 彰人), a character in the video game Hatsune Miku: Colorful Stage!
- Akito Sohma, leader of the Sohma clan in the manga and anime Fruits Basket
- Akito Takagi, a main character in Bakuman
- Akito Tenkawa, the main character Martian Successor Nadesico
- Akito Wanijima, character in the manga and anime Air Gear
- Akito Yamada, the titular character of My Love Story with Yamada-kun at Lv999

== See also ==
- Akito, a tonearm manufactured by the music system producer Linn Products
