= Ashiya Camera Club =

Photography club

The Ashiya Camera Club (ACC) was established in 1930 by Iwata Nakayama, Kanbei Hanaya, and Kichinosuke Beniya, Juzo Matsubara, Seiji Korai, and other amateur photographers in Kobe, Hyogo Prefecture, Japan.

== Background ==
In 1930 the Ashiya Camera Club was founded by Hanaya Kambei, Nakayama Iwata, Benitani Kichinosuke, and Korai Seiji. It was an amateur photography club, yet influential force in the progressive photography scene in Kansai. They supported avant-garde creative tendencies including the Japanese "New Photography" movement, Shinko Shashin.

As the leading member of the ACC, Nakayama Iwata released works in the Asahi Camera magazine that are through to be the first examples of the trend towards the Japanese Avant-garde Photography from the Japanese New Photography Movement. While Tokyo photographers shifted towards a photojournalistic approach under the influence of the Japanese government's efforts at controlling public opinion through photographs of Manchuria, Formosa, Korea and other Japanese colonial territories, amateur photography clubs in the Kansai region such as the ACC, Tampei Photography Club, Naniwa Photography Club, and others, tried to rebrand their experimental approaches to photography through the coinage of Avant-Garde Photography. Nakayama himself wrote in an article titled "The Appearance of Avant-Garde Photography in Advertising Photography" in Asahi Camera that Avant-Garde Photography was "A photography that's searching for a new feeling, force or freshness... it resembles Shinko Shashin (The Japanese New Photography Movement) that is in common use."

The Nakayama-led ACC and other Kansai-based photography clubs sustained their promotion of experimental photographic techniques marked by techniques such as photogram and photomontage influenced by European new photography movements such as Surrealism. The German Film und Foto exhibition was presented by The Asahi Shimbun in Tokyo in 1931 and was hailed as one of the shows that introduced European New Photography movements to Japan. The ACC held their first Tokyo exhibition in the same exhibition hall as the Film und Foto exhibition just a few days later. The coincidence demonstrated the Japanese interpretation of New Photography and brought acclaim to the photographic activities of amateur photography clubs in the Kansai region.

In 1935, the Ashiya Shashin Salon replaced the yearly Tokyo exhibition of the group.

Kanbei Hanaya was one of the leading members of the club. He traveled extensively around China and studied photography in Shanghai. He settled in Ashiya and bought a photo supply shop. This shop became the gathering place for photographers of the ACC.

The ACC published the Ashiya Camera Club nankin(yearbook) in 1931. They also held the Ashiya Photography Salon which was an annual exhibition one to nationwide submissions in 1935 but was discontinued after the fifth exhibition in 1940 due to the changing societal atmosphere as the government clamped down on expressions that were deemed subversive in the years leading up WWII.

== Exhibitions ==
In 2022, the Tokyo Photographic Art Museum presented the exhibition Avant-Garde Rising: The Photographic Vanguard in Modern Japan, which included the work of the Ashiya Camera Club.
