= Osamu Shiihara =

- Born: 3 October 1905
- Died: 1974 (aged 68–69)
- Occupation: Photographer
- Organization: Tampei Photography Club Spiegel Photographers Association

Osamu Shiihara (椎原治) was a Japanese photographer born on 3 October 1905 in Osaka City.

In 1932, Shiihara entered the Tokyo School of Fine Arts. He studied in the Western Painting department under the tutelage of Takeji Fujishima.

After finishing his studies in 1932, he came back to the Kansai area of Japan and started photography. He established a small photography studio in Nishinomiya city in Hyogo prefecture. It was around this time that he joined the Tampei Photography Club.

Shiihara utilized many avant-garde photographic techniques such as photogram solarization, photomontage and photo peinture. He utilized his formal artistic education and drew directly on the glass plates negatives that were then printed onto photographic printing paper.

His work not only utilized experimental techniques but was modern due to his chosen subject matter. Female nudes featured prominently in his works.

According to Shiihara's son, Tamotsu Shiihara, his father, in parallel with his photographic works, would paint large scenery paintings. In an essay Tamotsu quotes his father's statement in the monograph Light (Hikari): "photography has developed under the influence of painting, however, now is the time that it must be real to itself and take its own path as photography, different from the path of painting." His commitment to the creation of photography as an art form unique from painting is clear.

He believed that photography and painting should develop independently from each other. In the years that he was active as a photographer, Shiihara painted over 100 of large scenery paintings. In a statement about his father's art, Tamotsu states:

Having learnt western painting at the Tokyo Fine arts School, he relied on his artistic sensibility and the techniques that he had obtained there and took pride in them. I think it is due to this that he resolutely challenged both the medium of photography and painting during the years.

Shiihara is also known for his contribution to the Wandering Jew series that documented the plight of Jewish refugees temporarily staying in Kobe during the Pacific War as they awaited visas to enter the United States and South America. He worked other members of the Tampei Photography Club like Nakaji Yasui, Toru Kono, Kaneyoshi Tabuchi, Kametaro Kawasaki, and Yutaka Tezuka. This body of interwar work was later revisited in the Osaka section of the Tokyo Photographic Art Museum exhibition Avant-Garde Rising: The Photographic Vanguard in Modern Japan, which included Shiihara among the photographers representing the Kansai avant-garde.

He eventually moved to Osaka after the war. He continued photography and in 1953 helped to establish the Spiegel Photographers Association with Tanahashi Shisui.

Shiihara's work is in permanent collections inside and outside of Japan. His work is in The National Museum of Modern Art, Tokyo; the Tokyo Photographic Art Museum; the J. Paul Getty Museum; The Museum of Modern Art, New York; The Museum of Fine Arts, Houston; and The Art Institute of Chicago.
