= Ei-Q =

Japanese artist (1911–1960)

Ei-Q (瑛九, Eikyū; April 28, 1911 – March 10, 1960, in English occasionally "Q. Ei" or "Ei Kyu") was a Japanese artist who worked in a variety of media, including photography and engraving. He came to the forefront of the Japanese avant-garde with his 1936 collection of photo-dessins, a fusion of photograms and paintings. He also founded several art organizations, including the Democratic Artists Association.

== Life and career ==
Ei-Q, whose early work was done under his real name of Hideo Sugita (杉田 秀夫, Sugita Hideo), was born in Miyazaki-machi (now Miyazaki City), Miyazaki Prefecture on April 28, 1911. In 1925 Sugita entered an art school in Tokyo to study western-style painting, and his criticism of western art started appearing in the art magazines Atelier and Mizue in 1927, in which year he also left the school. In 1930 he entered a photography school and from then on pursued both painting and photography and more particularly photograms, first experimenting briefly with these in 1930, then dropping them in pursuit of painting, and then returning to them in 1936.

Ei-Q was influenced by the Surrealist aesthetic and also published essays promoting photography as an art form independent of painting. This did not imply a rejection of painting, and he worked toward what in 1935 he termed photo-dessins, a fusion of photograms and paintings. A first collection of these, published in an edition of 40 in 1936 as Nemuri no riyū (眠りの理由, "the reason for sleep"), took him to the forefront of the Japanese avant garde. Akiko Okatsuka rates Ei-Q (as he had named himself in 1935), together with Sutezō Otono, as standing out among the many Japanese exponents of photograms, unlike the majority in their ability to use them for expressive rather than merely playful ends. Ei-Q also contributed photograms and photography criticism to Photo Times. Later museum narratives, including the Tokyo Photographic Art Museum exhibition Avant-Garde Rising: The Photographic Vanguard in Modern Japan, have situated this aspect of his interwar work within the wider milieu of avant-garde photography in Tokyo. (He also became an enthusiastic proponent of Esperanto at about the same time.)

Ei-Q set up the art organization Jiyū Bijutsu Kyōkai (自由美術協会) in 1937; this lasted until 1951.

Ei-Q was able to resume his work after the war and in 1951 set up the group Democratic Artists Association (デモクラート美術家協会, Demokurāto Bijutsuka Kyōkai) in Osaka. Membership was by invitation only, but the idea was to promote the free expression of members, who included woodblock artists, designers, photographers and others. On Ei-Q's move from Osaka to Urawa later in the same year, the group set up a branch in nearby Tokyo as well; Eikoh Hosoe and Takeji Iwamiya then joined. The Association lasted until 1957, holding exhibitions of its works.

Also in 1951 Ei-Q started etching and lithography; he would continue exploring new art media until his death. He was also active in art education, in 1952 setting up Sōzō Biiku Kyōkai (創造美育協会).

Ei-Q died on March 10, 1960.

== Exhibitions ==
- "Ei-Q photo-dessins" (瑛九フォト・デッサン). 1936.
- "Ei-Q photo-dessins" (瑛九フォト・デッサン). 1951.
- "Dai ikkai Tōkyō kokusai hanga biennāre-ten" (第1回東京国際版画ビエンナーレ展, i.e. the first Tokyo international biennale of wood engravings). 1957.
- "Ei-Q kaiko-ten" (瑛九回顧展). 1970.
- "Modanizumu no kōseki: Onchi Kōshirō, Ei-Q" (モダニズムの光跡: 恩地孝四郎・椎原治・瑛九) / "Traces of Light in Modernism: Koshiro Onchi, Osamu Shiihara and Ei-Kyu". National Museum of Modern Art, Tokyo, February–March 1997. The work of Kōshirō Onchi, Osamu Shiihara, and Ei-Q.
- "Demokurāto 1951–1957: Kaihō sareta sengo bijutsu" (デモクラート1951–1957 開放された戦後美術). Museum of Modern Art, Saitama, August–October 1999.
- "Ei-Q no himitsu-ten: Āto ni deau natsu" (瑛九のヒミツ展 アートにであう夏) vol. 2. Fukuoka Art Museum (Fukuoka), July–August 2000.
- "Ei-Q, Ay-O, Ikeda Masuo" (瑛久 靉嘔 池田満寿夫) Sayama Shiritsu Hakubutsukan (Sayama), October–December 2000. An exhibition of Ei-Q, Ay-O and Masuo Ikeda.
- "Urawa gaka to sono jidai: Terauchi Manjirō, Ei-Q, Takada Makoto o chūshin ni" (浦和画家とその時代 寺内万治郎・瑛九・高田誠). Urawa Art Museum (Urawa), 2000. (in Japanese) Catalogue of the opening exhibition of the museum, on the painters of Urawa, and particularly Manjirō Terauchi, Ei-Q, and Makoto Takada.
- "Ei-Q foto-dessan-ten" (瑛九フォト・デッサン展) / "Ei-Q Photo Dessin". National Museum of Art, Osaka (Suita), October–December 2005.
- "Ei-Q-ten" (瑛九展). Kawagoe Gallery, February 2006.
- "Ei-Q to sono shūhen" (瑛九とその周辺). Machida City Museum of Graphic Arts (Machida), June–September 2008.
- "Ei-Q-ten" (瑛九展). Kawagoe Gallery, September 2008.

== Works in permanent collections ==
Works by Ei-Q are in the permanent collections of the following institutions:

- Ashiya City Museum of Art and History (Ashiya)
- Fukuoka Art Museum (Fukuoka City); 45 photo-dessins.
- Homma Museum of Art (Sakata).
- Mie Prefectural Art Museum (Tsu).
- Miyagi Museum of Art (Sendai)
- Miyakonojo City Museum of Art (Miyakonojo).
- Miyazaki Prefectural Art Museum (Miyazaki City)
- Nagashima Museum (Kagoshima City).
- Niigata City Art Museum (Niigata City).
- Okawa Museum of Art (Kiryū).
- Museum of Modern Art, Saitama (Saitama City); 98 photo-dessins and five photo collages.
- Takamatsu City Museum of Art (Takamatsu).
- Tokushima Modern Art Museum (Tokushima City)
- Tokyo Metropolitan Museum of Photography
- Museum of Contemporary Art, Tokyo.
- Toneyama Kōjin Kinen Bijutsukan (利根山光人記念美術館, Kitakami).
- Urawa Art Museum (Urawa)
- Museum of Modern Art, Wakayama (Wakayama City)
- Yokohama Museum of Art (Yokohama).
- Yokosuka Museum of Art (Yokosuka).

== Books by and of Ei-Q ==
- Ei-Q. Nemuri no riyū: Ei-Q-shi fotodessan sakuhinshū (眠りの理由 瑛九氏フォト・デッサン作品集. Geijutsugaku Kenkyūkai, 1936.
- Ei-Q and Kiyomi Shimazaki (島崎清海). Dōbanga no tsukurikata (銅版画の作り方. Tokyo: Mon Shoten, 1956. (in Japanese) An introductory practical book about etching.
- Mitsuharu Yamada (山田光春). Ei-Q: Hyōden to sakuhin (瑛九 評伝と作品). Tokyo: Seiryūdō, 1976. (in Japanese)
- Ei-Q-shi fotodessan-ten (瑛九フォト・デッサン展. Fukuoka: Fukuoka Art Museum, 1978.
- Ei-Q-ten: Gendai bijutsu no chichi (瑛九展: 現代美術の父). N.p.: Ei-Q-ten Kaisai Iinkai, 1979. (in Japanese)
- Sadajirō Kubo (久保貞次郎). Ei-Q to nakama-tachi (瑛九と仲間たち). Kubo Sadajirō Bijutsu no Sekai (久保貞次郎美術の世界) 2. Tokyo: Sōbunsha, 1985. ISBN 4-88582-821-X.
- Ei-Q to sono shūhen (瑛九とその周辺). Tokyo: Yomiuri Shinbunsha, 1986. (in Japanese) Catalogue of an exhibition, held at the Museum of Modern Art, Saitama and elsewhere, of the work of Ei-Q and his circle.
- Ei-Q foto-dessan-ten (瑛九フォト・デッサン展). Tokyo: Asahi Shinbunsha, 1987. (in Japanese) Catalogue of an exhibition of Ei-Q's photo-dessins.
- Ei-Q to sono nakama-tachi-ten (瑛九とその仲間たち展). Machida, Tokyo: Machida City Museum of Graphic Art, 1988. (in Japanese) Catalogue of an exhibition held at Machida City Museum of Graphic Art in 1988.
- Ei-Q-ten: Yusai, foto-dessan, hanga (瑛九展: 油彩・フォトデッサン・版画). Itami: Itami City Museum of Art, 1990. (in Japanese) Catalogue of an exhibition of Ei-Q's oil paintings, photo-dessins and wood block prints held at the Itami City Museum of Art.
- Ei-Q sakuhinshū (瑛九作品集). Tokyo: Nihon Keizai Shinbun-sha, 1997. ISBN 4-532-12309-7. (in Japanese) A collection of the work of Ei-Q.
- Hikari no kaseki: Ei-Q to fotoguramu no sekai (光の化石: 瑛九とフォトグラムの世界). Urawa: Museum of Modern Art, Saitama, 1997. (in Japanese) Catalogue of an exhibition of Ei-Q's photograms.
- Modanizumu no kōseki: Onchi Kōshirō, Ei-Q モダニズムの光跡: 恩地孝四郎・椎原治・瑛九) / Traces of Light in Modernism: Koshiro Onchi, Osamu Shiihara and Ei-Kyu. Tokyo: National Museum of Modern Art, Tokyo, 1997. (in Japanese) (in English) Catalogue of an exhibition at the National Museum of Modern Art, Tokyo of the work of Kōshirō Onchi, Osamu Shiihara, and Ei-Q.
- Ei-Q no himitsu-ten: Āto ni deau natsu (瑛九のヒミツ展 アートにであう夏) vol. 2. Fukuoka: Fukuoka Art Museum, 2000.(in Japanese)
- Urawa gaka to sono jidai: Terauchi Manjirō, Ei-Q, Takada Makoto o chūshin ni (浦和画家とその時代 寺内万治郎・瑛九・高田誠). Urawa, Saitama: Urawa Art Museum, 2000. (in Japanese) Catalogue of the opening exhibition of Urawa Art Museum, on the painters of Urawa, and particularly Manjirō Terauchi, Ei-Q, and Makoto Takada.
- Ei-Q kara no tegami (瑛九からの手紙). Ei-Q Bijutsukan, 2000. (in Japanese)
- Masaomi Sugita (杉田正臣). Chichi (父). Miyazaki 21-seki Bunko (みやざき21世紀文庫) 27. Miyazaki: Kōmyakusha, 2000. ISBN 4-906008-51-8. (in Japanese) A book about Ei-Q by his son.
- Hirofumi Wada. Ei-Q, Shimozato Yoshio: renzu no avangyarudo (瑛九、下郷羊雄・レンズのアヴァンギャルド). Vol. 14 of Korekushon Nihon shūrurearisumu (コレクション・日本シュールレアリスム). Tokyo: Hon no Tomo-sha, 2001. ISBN 4-89439-294-1. (in Japanese) On Ei-Q, Yoshio Shimozato, and surrealism in Japanese photography.
- Ei-Q foto-dessan-ten (瑛九フォト・デッサン展). Suita, Osaka: National Museum of Art, Osaka, 2005. (in Japanese) Catalogue of an exhibition held at the National Museum of Art, Osaka of Ei-Q's photo-dessins.
