= Tampei Photography Club =

Japanese photography organization

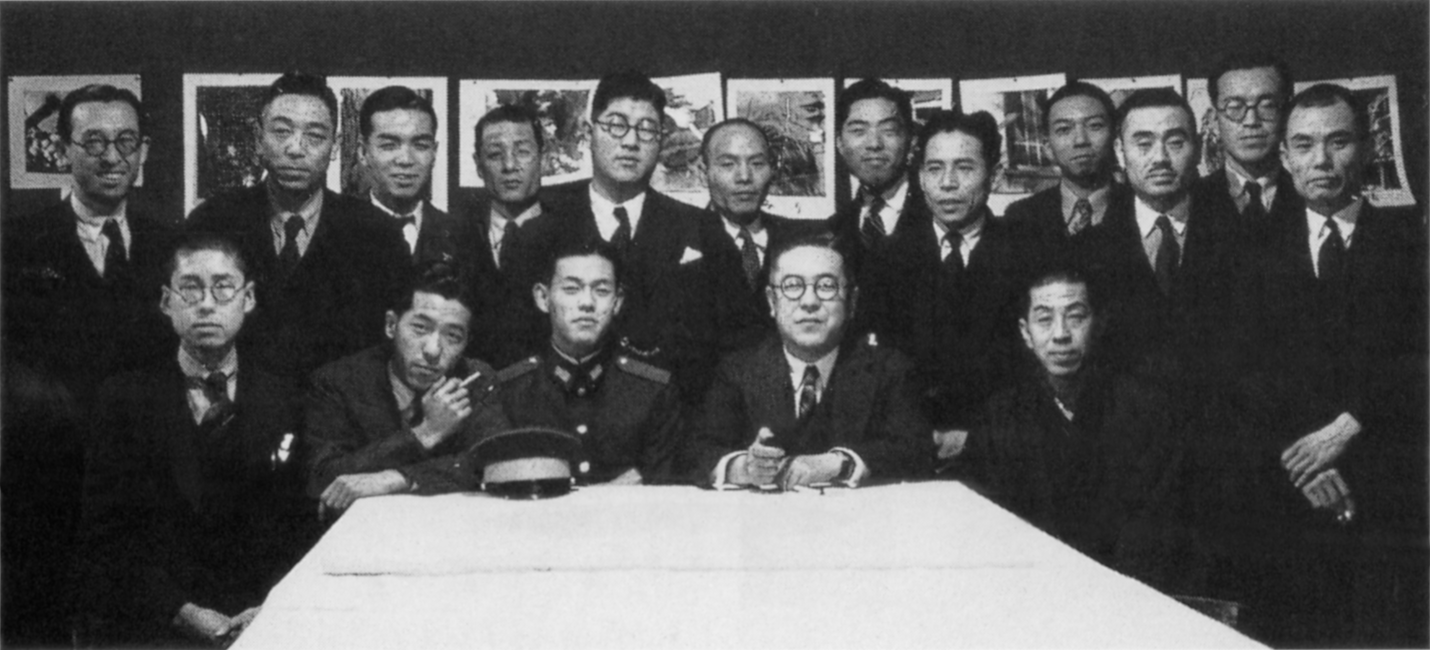
Nakaharu Yasui (center) and members of Tanpei Photography Club

The Tampei Photography Club (丹平写真倶楽部) was a group based in Osaka from 1930 until 1941 that promoted avant-garde photography—often discussed in relation to the interwar modernist "New Photography" movement known as Shinkō shashin—and, toward the end, socially concerned photography.

The group was founded around the photographer Bizan Ueda, among photographers who bought their supplies from the Tampei Pharmacy (丹平薬局, Tanpei yakkyoku) in Shinsaibashi, Osaka. The founding members included Terushichi Hirai, Kōrō Honjō and Tōru Kōno; these were soon augmented by Kaneyoshi Tabuchi, Nakaji Yasui, and others.

In 1930, Iwata Nakayama wrote an article in the December issue of Asahi Camera titled “the Appearance of Avant-garde photography in Advertising Photography” in which he coined the usage of Zen'ei-shashin (“avant-garde photography”). While Zen'ei shashin is usually understood as a photography influenced by Surrealism in the 1930s, Nakayama framed it as an extension of Shinkō Shashin, which was characterized as “use of a small-format camera, extreme angles, photograms, and other techniques that exploited the mechanical nature of making images.” That same issue of Asahi Camera introduced the works of Bizan Ueda of the Tampei Photography Club featuring his use of various experimental techniques such as multiple exposure and collage. While the 1930s saw the rise of photojournalism based in Tokyo, photography clubs of the Kansai region continued their avant-garde experiments. Asahi Camera presented the works of Bizen Ueda and Yasui Nakaji in 1936 as well.

The group's first exhibition was held in 1931 but it was the second exhibition, in 1932, that caused a stir, with avant-garde works. The club exhibited frequently; its first exhibition in Tokyo held in 1935.

The club was featured in the Osaka section of the 2022 Tokyo Photographic Art Museum exhibition Avant-Garde Rising: The Photographic Vanguard in Modern Japan, , which positioned Tampei as part of the Kansai-centered development of Japanese avant-garde photography. Photography historian, Jelena Stojković characterizes photography organizations such as the Naniwa Photography Club and Tampei as highly collaborative organizations that flourished particularly in the Kansai region. Although their members were often described as amateurs, they met regularly to critique one another’s work, organized exhibitions, and published essays and commentaries in the photographic monthlies with which they maintained close ties. Stojković further notes that members undertook photographic excursions together, with the same locations, objects, even sitters appearing in the works of different photographers. As an example, she identifies to a cow bone that appears in the still-life compositions of both Nakaji Yasui and Terushichi Hirai, likely borrowed from a science classroom at an elementary school visited by club members visited in 1937.

Collaboration extended beyond individual clubs. Tampei, The Naniwa Photography Club, the Nagoya Photo Avant-Garde Club formed part of a broader interregional network that fostered dialogue across organizations. This exchange is exemplified by the Avant-Garde Photography Symposium held in June 1938 under the auspices of the magazine Photo Times, at which representatives from various clubs gathered to debate the meaning of the term “Avant-Garde.”

Six photographers from the Tampei Photography Club collaborated in 1941 to photograph Jewish refugees. The project was instigated by Yasui Nakaji. The five other members were Kametaro Kawasaki, Toru Kono, Kaneyoshi Tabuchi, Yutaka Tezuka, and Osamu Shiihara. The resulting works were exhibited in “Wandering Jews," the 23^{rd} exhibition of the club held in March of 1941 with 22 photographs depicted exiles from eastern Europe who were living in Kobe. Six of these were by Yasui. The club was forced to close later that year.

The club reemerged after the war, but did not regain its prominence.
