= Heihachirō Sakai =

Japanese photographer (born 1930)

Heihachirō Sakai (酒井平八郎, born 1930) is a Japanese photographer and a member of the Naniwa Photography Club. He joined the club in 1958.

Photography critic Kōtaro Iizawa has noted the combination of social subject matter and technical experimentations produced by Sakai and other postwar members of the Naniwa Photography Club.

In 2019, the New Orleans Museum of Art included an untitled photograph by Sakai from around 1959 in the exhibition You Are Here: A Brief History of Photography and Place. Curator Brian Piper described the photograph as disrupting the viewer's sense of location by manipulating scale and pushing representation toward abstraction.

Sakai's works are held in the collections of the Tokyo Photographic Art Museum and the New Orleans Museum of Art.
