= Haruo Tomiyama =

Japanese photographer

Haruo Tomiyama (富山 治夫, Tomiyama Haruo), 1935-15 October 2016 was a versatile Japanese photographer, active since the 1960s.

== Life and work ==
Born in Kanda (Tokyo) on 25 February 1935, Tomiyama dropped out of evening high school in 1956 to study photography for himself.

From 1960 he was employed as a photographer for the new magazine Josei Jishin; from 1963 he was employed by Asahi Shinbunsha (publisher of Asahi Shinbun), and in the following year he started "Gendai gokan" for the company's news weekly Asahi Journal. The series — the literal meaning of whose title is something like "a sense for the contemporary language" — won Tomiyama the 1966 newcomer's prize of Nihon Shashin Hihyōka Kyōkai (日本写真批評家協会). In 1966 Tomiyama became a freelance, making extensive travels abroad.

Tomiyama's book Sadogashima (佐渡島), a collection of photographs of Sado island published in 1978/79, won the Kodansha Publishing Culture Award (講談社出版文化賞) for a work of photography and the PSJ annual award.

In 1994 Tomiyama was shown the archive of glass plates by the then-forgotten Sado-based amateur photographer Tomio Kondō. He printed many of these and acted as editor in chief for the first major collection of Kondō's works. This won him the PSJ annual award for a second time.

Tomiyama's works are in the permanent collection of the Tokyo Metropolitan Museum of Photography and the National Museum of Modern Art, Tokyo.

== Exhibitions ==
- "Japan Today". ICP (Manhattan), 1978.
- Digital photography exhibition for the 50th anniversary of the People's Republic of China. Beijing Art Museum, 1999.
- "Zen shūgyō" (禅修業). Wako (Ginza, Tokyo), 2002.
- "Tomiyama Haruo no Sadogashima" (富山治夫の佐渡島). Canon Salon (Tokyo), 2003.
- "Gendai gokan: our day" (現代語感 our day). JCII Photo Salon (Ichibanchō, Chiyoda-ku, Tokyo), 2008.
- "Maboroshi no chōtokkyū Ajia-go" (幻の超特急「あじあ号」). Gallery Walk, Shiodome Media Tower (Shinbashi, Tokyo), 2009.

== Books ==
=== Books of Tomiyama's work ===
- Tōkyō no 12-shō (東京の12章). Kyoto: Tankōshinsha, 1963. (in Japanese) With Yasaburō Ikeda and Kiyoshi Fujikawa. The title means "Twelve chapters of Tokyo".
- Gendai gokan (現代語感). Eizō no Gendai 6. Tokyo: Chūōkōronsha, 1971. (in Japanese)
- Sadogashima (佐渡島). Tokyo: Asahi Shinbunsha, 1979. (in Japanese) A large book of black and white photographs of Sado island. Captions and text in Japanese.
- Chūgoku (中国). 3 vols. Tokyo: Nihon Kōtsū Kōsha, 1982. (in Japanese)
- Jūnidaime Ichikawa Danjūrō: Shūmei zenkiroku (十二代目市川団十郎 襲名全記録). Tokyo: Heibonsha, 1985. ISBN 4-582-65403-7. (in Japanese) Photographs of Ichikawa Danjūrō XII.
- Hokuō ni mau hannya (北欧に舞う般若). Tokyo: the photographer, 1986. (in Japanese) The title means "Paññā dancing in northern Europe".
- Gendai gokan: 1961–1999 (現代語感 1961–1999). Beijing, 1999.
- Zen shūgyō (禪修行). Tokyo: Sōtōshū Shūmuchō, 2002. (in Japanese) On zen training, published by the Sōtō school.
- Gekkō no kizuna: Wakaki Ikeda Daisaku, 1972-nen no kioku (月光の絆 若き池田大作1972年の記憶). Tokyo: Usio, 2002. ISBN 4-267-01656-9. (in Japanese) Photos taken in 1972 of the Buddhist magnate Daisaku Ikeda, from the Sōka Gakkai publisher. The title means "The bonds of moonlight: Young Daisaku Ikeda, memories of 1972."
- Gendai gokan: 1960–2004 our day (現代語感 1960–2004 our day). Tokyo: Kōdansha, 2004. ISBN 4-06-212396-7. (in Japanese)
- Gendai gokan: 1960–2008 our day (現代語感 1960–2008 our day). JCII Photo Salon Library 207. Tokyo: JCII, 2008. (in Japanese)

=== Other books with contributions by Tomiyama ===
- Ningen kakumei no kiroku (人間革命の記録) / The Document of Human Revolution. Tokyo: Shashin-hyōronsha, 1973. (in Japanese) With Yasuhiro Ishimoto. About Sōka Gakkai.
- Nihon no banka: Ushinaware yuku kurashi no katachi (日本の挽歌 失われゆく暮らしのかたち). Tokyo: Kadokawa-shoten, 1979. (in Japanese) With Tetsurō Morimoto.
- Kyōgeki (京劇). 2 vols. Tokyo: Heibonsha, 1980. (in Japanese) With others.
- Shigosen no matsuri: Yamamoto Yasue no kai kōen (子午線の祀り 山本安英の会公演). Tokyo: Iwanami Hall, 1980. (in Japanese) With Junji Kinoshita. Title means "Festival of the meridian: Lectures of the Yasue Yamamoto society".
- Tōkyō: Toshi no shisen (東京 都市の視線) / Tokyo: A City Perspective. Tokyo: Tokyo Metropolitan Museum of Photography, 1990. Exhibition catalogue. (in Japanese and English)
- Nihon shashin no tenkan: 1960 nendai no hyōgen (日本写真の転換：1960時代の表現) / Innovation in Japanese Photography in the 1960s. Tokyo: Tokyo Metropolitan Museum of Photography, 1991. Exhibition catalogue. (in Japanese and English)
- Sado mangekyō (佐渡万華鏡). Matsumoto: Kyōdo Shuppansha (郷土出版社), 1994. ISBN 4-87663-264-2. (in Japanese) Tomiyama is the editor. A generous anthology of photography of Sado island by Tomio Kondō, showing family life, farming, tourism, new technology, popular spectacles, and much else. The title means "Sado kaleidoscope".
