= Shimizu Tōkoku =

Japanese photographer

Shimizu Tōkoku (清水 東谷; 1841–1907) was a Japanese photographer.
