= Meison Kobayashi =

Japanese photographer

Meison Kobayashi (小林 鳴村, Kobayashi Meison; born 1889, date of death unknown) was a Japanese photographer. He was a member of the Naniwa Photography Club. His interwar work was later included in the Osaka section of the Tokyo Photographic Art Museum exhibition Avant-Garde Rising: The Photographic Vanguard in Modern Japan.
