= Osamu Hayasaki =

Japanese photographer

Osamu Hayasaki (早崎治, Hayasaki Osamu; 1933–1993) was a Japanese photographer.
