= Naniwa Photography Club =

Amateur photography club

The Naniwa Photography Club (浪華写真倶楽部) is an avant-garde amateur photography club that was established with the support of the Kuwata Photographic Materials company in 1904 in Osaka. It is the oldest amateur photography club in Japan. Key members were Kuwata Shozaburo, Ishii Yoshinosuke, Kometani Koro, Fukumori Hayuko, Yasui Nakaji, Yoho Tsuda, Hirai Terushichi, Kobayashi Meison, Shōsuke Sekioka, Heihachirō Sakai, and Umesaka Ori.

After establishment, the club began to exhibit their Nami-ten exhibition. This photography exhibition has been held almost every year since the club was established with several exceptions of the years during World War II. The clubs second exhibition was held in 1908 and kicked off major organized activities by the club. The central photographers in this exhibition were Kometani Koro, Yokoyama Kinkei and Kajiwara Keibun. These photographers used pigment printing process in their gum-bichromate prints.

During the Taisho Era, the group's works were centered around Pictorialism. Yasui Nakaji became a member of the Naniwa Photography Club in the second half of the Taisho Era. He used the Bromoil Process to create his Pictorialist photographs. Nakaji would later establish the Tampei Photography Club in 1930.

In the mid-1920s, the club also participated in intercity exchanges with other leading amateur photography clubs in Japan. A later history of the Chukyo photography world records that on 22 and 23 November 1925, the Naniwa Photography Club joined the Tokyo Photography Research Society and the Aiyu Photography Club in a joint shooting excursion in the Shizuoka area; the account describes the three organizations as Japan's "three major clubs" and notes that Naniwa sent twenty-two participants.

The character of the works exhibited by the Naniwa Photography Club changed drastically in the 21st Nami-ten exhibition in 1932 when the works of Koishi Kiyoshi were exhibited. Koishi's series Early Summer Nerves utilized special techniques such as photogram and photomontage. This was the moment that the Naniwa Photography Club became one of the central clubs of the Japanese Shinko-Shashin (New Photography) Movement. They embarked on a more Surrealist approach to avant-garde photography in Japan.

Together with the Tampei Photography Club and the Ashiya Camera Club, the Naniwa Photography Club became the cultural powerhouses of the Kansai photography scene. While their counterparts in Tokyo focused more on a journalistic approach to photography that highlighted social issues the Kansai photography clubs pursued a more modernist style approach. This Kansai-centered development was later highlighted in the Osaka section of the 2022 Tokyo Photographic Art Museum exhibition Avant-Garde Rising: The Photographic Vanguard in Modern Japan.

Sakata Minoru was a member of the Naniwa Photography Club but in 1934 became the leader of the Nagoya Photography Group; an exhibition summary by the Tokyo Photographic Art Museum notes that the Nagoya Photo Avant-Garde included the poet-photographer Kansuke Yamamoto.

The club's influence extended beyond Osaka through younger photographers such as Seikō Samizo, who belonged to the generation that shifted the club toward New Photography and later helped carry those connections into Nagoya, where he became one of the promoters of the Akebono Photography Club, published work in the magazine Cameraman, and was later listed among the founding members of Nagoya Photo Avant-Garde.
