= Ōri Umesaka =

Japanese photographer

Ōri Umesaka (梅阪 鶯里, Umesaka Ōri; 1900–1965) was a Japanese photographer. He was considered a major figure of mid-century Japanese photography.

== Career ==
Umesaka joined the Naniwa Photography Club in 1920. He first publicly exhibited his work in November 1922. In November 1926, he won first prize in the first Japan Photography Grand Salon. He was a founding member of Ginreisha, a photography group that focused on innovative techniques. Formed in 1927, the group first exhibited in 1928, but became defunct around 1930.

== Style ==
Umesaka's 1924 photograph Smoking City was considered unusual for Japanese photography at the time, as it depicted an urban-industrial landscape. Urban themes became common in Japanese photography in later years. He often worked in gum bichromate, such as in Smoking City and Bamboo Forest.
