= Ōno Benkichi =

Japanese photographer

Ōno Benkichi (大野 弁吉; 1801–1870) was a Japanese photographer and inventor. He is known for making Karakuri puppets.

== Life and career ==
Ōno Benkichi was born in Kyoto in 1801. His real name was Nakamuraya Benkichi (中村屋弁吉). At the age of 20, he moved to Nagasaki to study Western medicine and science. After studying weaponry and mathematics on Tsushima Island, he returned to Kyoto and married. In 1831, he moved to Ohno (now Ishikawa Prefecture), where his wife was born, and lived there for the rest of his life. He died in 1870.

Ōno was one of the first Japanese to experiment with photography. His first photograph dates back to 1850s. Ōno designed various devices, including cameras, lighters, clocks, and telescopes. His invention, Electel (エレキテル, Erekiteru), was designed to generate static electricity and was used in medicine. One of his famous mechanisms is called the "Tea-serving boy".

== Legacy ==
Karakuri Memorial Museum is dedicated to Ōno's inventions and life, and features a display of the Karakuri puppets he made.
