= Yoshinori Shigi =

Japanese politician

Yoshinori Shigi (信貴 芳則, Shigi Yoshinori; born February 26, 1961) is a Japanese politician.

== History ==
He was born in Mitacho, Kishiwada, Osaka, Japan. He graduated from Yamadai Kita Elementary School, Yamadai Junior High School, Melsei Senior High School, and Doshisha University. From April 1983 to March 1993, he acted as secretary to Shinzo Inoue of the Osaka Prefectural Assembly.
