= Kanbei Hanaya =

Japanese photographer

Kanbei Hanaya (ハナヤ 勘兵衛, Hanaya Kanbei; 1903–1991) was a Japanese photographer. He was born in Osaka in 1903. In his twenties, he travelled in China and studied photography in Shanghai. In 1929, he purchased a photography supply shop in Ashiya, a city in Japan's Hyōgo Prefecture. The Ashiya Camera Club, a prominent feature of the New Photography movement, formed at the shop in 1930. Later museum accounts, including the Osaka section of the Tokyo Photographic Art Museum exhibition Avant-Garde Rising: The Photographic Vanguard in Modern Japan, situated the club within the wider Kansai avant-garde and included Hanaya among the photographers represented. Its membership included Iwata Nakayama, Kichinosuke Benitani, Juzo Matsubara, and Korai Seiji. The group began exhibiting in 1930 and published its first yearbook in 1931.

== Background ==
From May 1932 to December 1933, Hanaya published in the modernist journal Koga. He helped found the Kansai Student Photography League in 1934. After World War II, he actively promoted photography in Kansai via networking and gallery promotion. He was awarded a distinguished contribution award from the Photographic Society of Japan in 1986.
