= Nakaji Yasui =

Japanese photographer

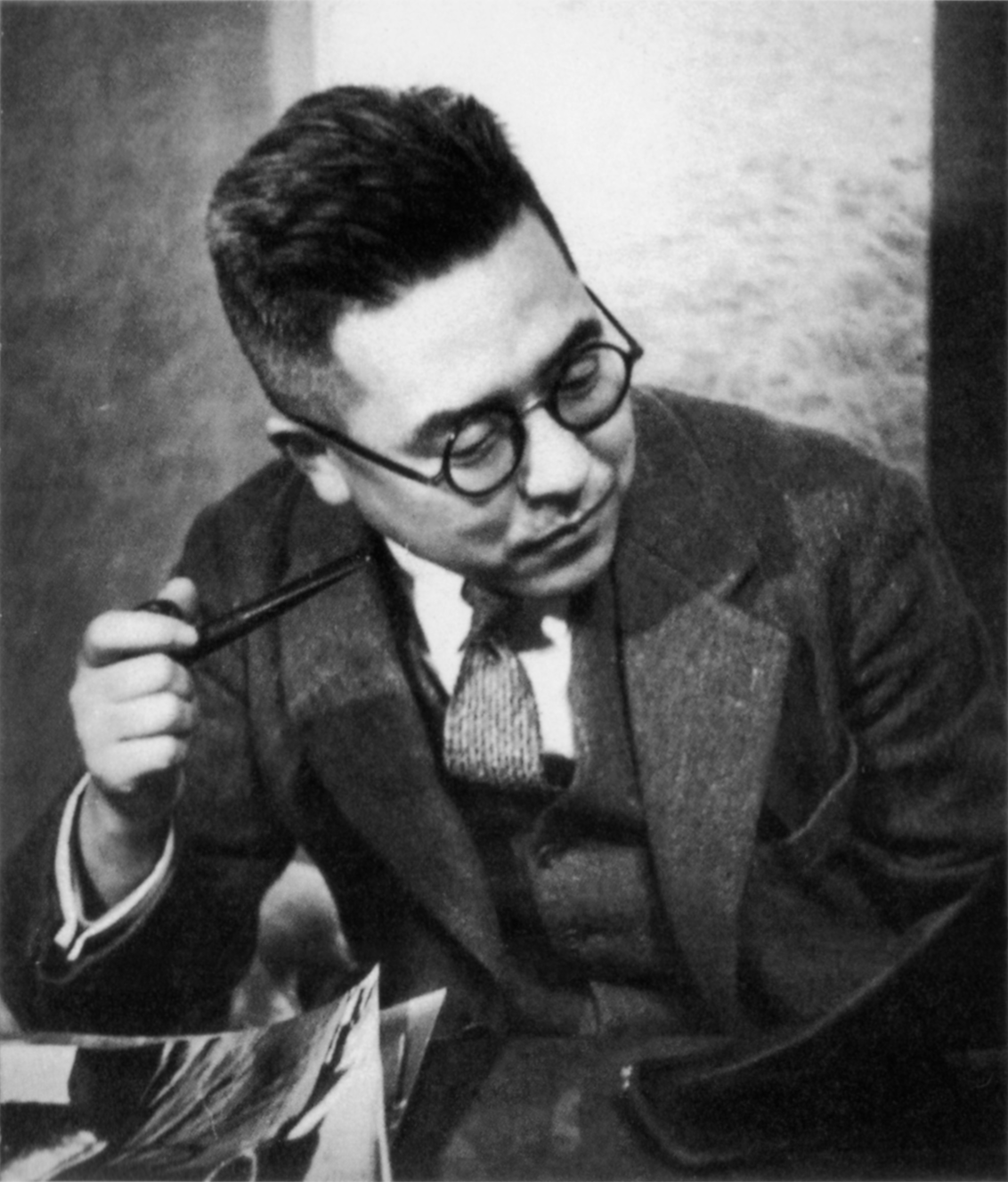
Nakaji Yasui

Nakaji Yasui (安井 仲治, Yasui Nakaji) (15 December 1903 – 15 March 1942) was one of the most prominent photographers in the first half of the 20th century in Japan.

== Life ==
Yasui was born in Osaka and became a member of the Naniwa Photography Club (浪華写真倶楽部, Naniwa Shashin Kurabu) in 1920s and also became a member of the Tampei Photography Club (丹平写真倶楽部, Tanpei Shashin Kurabu) in 1930.

His photographs cover a wide range from pictorialism to straight photography, including photomontages. He appreciated every type and kind of photographs without any prejudice and tried not to reject any of them even during wartime.

== Works ==
- Displaced Jews (流氓ユダヤ, Robou Judaya) photographs of Jewish people who fled from the Nazis to Kobe (Japan) in the 1930s — in collaboration with several other photographers in the Tampei Shashin Club, such as Osamu Shiihara, Kaneyoshi Tabuchi and Tōru Kōno
- Yamane Circus Group (山根曲馬団, Yamane Kyokubadan) series

== Exhibitions in Japan ==
- Nakaji Yasui (安井仲治展) at Hyōgo Prefectural Museum of Modern Art (兵庫県立近代美術館) and Seibu Contemporary Art Gallery (西武百貨店コンテンポラリーアートギャラリー), 1987
- Nakaji Yasui (安井仲治展) at Watarium, Tokyo, 1993
- Nakaji Yasui 1903–1942, The Photography (安井仲治展) at Shoto Museum of Art, Tokyo (渋谷区立松濤美術館) and Nagoya City Art Museum (名古屋市美術館), 2004 and 2005

== References and further reading ==
- (in Japanese) déjà-vu, vol. 12 (featuring Nakaji Yasui and the 1930s (特集「安井仲治と1930年代」), published by Photo Planet 1993, The exhibition catalogue for Nakaji Yasui at Watarium. (No ISBN.)
- Kaneko Ryūichi. Modern Photography in Japan 1915–1940. San Francisco: Friends of Photography, 2001. ISBN 0-933286-74-0.
- "Nakaji Yasui". Exhibition catalogue. Hyōgo Prefectural Museum of Modern Art and Seibu Contemporary Art Gallery, 1987. (No ISBN.)
- (in Japanese) Nakaji Yasui (安井仲治) Nihon no shashinka (日本の写真家, "Japanese photographers"), vol. 9. Tokyo: Iwanami Shoten, 1999. ISBN 4-00-008349-X
- Tucker, Anne Wilkes, et al. The History of Japanese Photography. New Haven: Yale University Press, 2003. ISBN 0-300-09925-8.
- (in Japanese) Yasui Nakaji: Modanizumu o kakenuketa tensai shashinka (安井仲治 モダニズムを駆けぬけた天才写真家, Nakaji Yasui, genius of modern Japanese photography). Foto Musée. Tokyo: Shinchōsha, 1994. ISBN 4-10-602404-7.
- Yasui Nakaji shashin sakuhinshū (安井仲治写真作品集, "Nakaji Yasui, photographs"). Kyoto, 1942. An unbound portfolio that was privately produced by a group of photographers headed by Bizan Ueda (ostensibly in an edition of 50, although hors série examples also exist) and never offered for sale. Facsimile edition: Tokyo: Kokushokankōkai, 2005. ISBN 4-336-04490-2. The facsimile edition comes with short commentaries in both Japanese and English. (The entire portfolio is reproduced in miniature on pp. 278–84 of Nakaji Yasui: Photographer 1903–1942.)
- Tanjō hyakunen: Yasui Nakaji: Shashin no subete (誕生百年：安井仲治写真：写真のすべて) / Nakaji Yasui 1903–1942: The Photography. 2004. No publisher specified, but presumably one or more of the Shoto Museum of Art (Tokyo), the Nagoya City Art Museum (Nagoya), and Kyodo News (Tokyo). Paperback. Also: Yasui Nakaji shashinshū (安井仲治写真集) / Nakaji Yasui: Photographer 1903–1942. Tokyo: Kyodo News, 2004. ISBN 4-7641-0542-X. Hardback. The catalogue for the Shoto/Nagoya exhibition of 2004/2005; text in both Japanese and English. Despite their different titles, the two books seem to be virtually identical.
