= Minoru Minami =

Japanese photographer

Minoru Minami (南 実, Minami Minoru; 1887–1948) was a Japanese photographer. He served as the founding editor-in-chief of the photography magazine Geijutsu shashin kenkyu ("Art Photography Studies").
