= Manji Terashima =

Japanese photographer

Manji Terashima (寺嶋 萬治, Terashima Manji; 1898–1983) was a Japanese photographer. He was a member of the Manshū Shashin Sakka Kyōkai.
