= Yoshiyasu Suzuka =

Japanese photographer

Yoshiyasu Suzuka (鈴鹿 芳康, Suzuka Yoshiyasu; すずか よしやす, born 1947) is a Japanese photographer. His work is held at the Asia Art Archive, the Center for Creative Photography, and the Tokyo Metropolitan Museum of Photography.
