= Chizu Ono =

Japanese photographer

Chizu Ono (小野 千寿, Ono Chizu; b. January 1, 1970) is a Japanese photographer.

Ono was born in Akita Prefecture. She studied interior design at Tama Geijutsu Gakuen (多摩芸術学園) (an affiliate of Tama Art University that closed in 1992), graduating in 1991 to work as a designer. She stayed in France from 1995 to '96, returning to work again as a designer but pursuing photography in her spare time.

In 1997 her portfolio of black-and-white photographs of manhole covers and the like in Paris, Un curriculum vitæ, was exhibited at the Tokyo Metropolitan Museum of Photography and won a special prize in the second Tokyo International Photo-Biennale (第２回東京国際写真ビエンナーレ, Dainikai Tōkyō Kokusai Shashin Biennāre).

With her husband, Grégoire Dentan, Ono runs a design company, Atelier Grizou.

== Published work ==
- Tōkyō Kokusai Shashin Biennāre: Dainikai: Sono tayōsei o megutte (東京国際写真ビエンナーレ 第2回 その多様性をめぐって). Tokyo: Tokyo Metropolitan Museum of Photography, 1997.
