= Naonori Kohira =

Japanese photojournalist and media producer

Naonori Kohira (小平 尚典, Kohira Naonori) is a Japanese photojournalist and media producer who was one of the first exclusive photographers for the Japanese magazine Focus when it was launched. In 1985, he was the first photojournalist to reach the crash site of the Japan Airlines' jumbo jet crash, which resulted in the deaths of 520 people.

== Career ==
Kohira graduated from College of Art, Nihon University completing his bachelor's degree in photography in 1976. After his graduation, he flew to the United Kingdom and stayed there for about a year. During his stay there, he roamed about Europe, visiting many European countries.

Kohira came back to Japan in 1977, where he worked for various magazines as an editorial photographer. Meanwhile, he pursued his aspiration for being a photojournalist and got involved in the launch of a Japanese magazine called Focus. He became one of the magazine’s exclusive photographers.

In 1987, Kohira moved to Los Angeles with his family, where he worked as a global photojournalist until he came back to Japan in 2009. He later became a media producer. Kohira now lives in Tokyo. He is CEO of Kohira Persons Project Co. Inc., Director of Octavia Records Inc., and Executive Director of the Gohan Society Tokyo Bureau.

== Episodes ==
During his stay in UK, Kohira met Malcolm McLaren in London and was asked to do a photo shoot for Sex Pistols before their debut.

At Focus, Kohira was initially a member of the Column section. After the fire at Hotel New Japan, he moved to the News and Affairs section.

When the Japan Airlines jumbo jet crashed into Osutaka Ridge in Gunma Prefecture on August 12, 1985, Kohira was the first photographer who reached the crash site. There he discovered the crash survivors. Six years later, he published a photo book ‘4/524’ in Japan and the United States of America simultaneously.

Kohira accompanied Masayoshi Son as a photographer when Son interviewed Bill Gates on July 23, 1987.

Kohira and Paul Saffo, who was then a Roy Amara fellow at Institute for the Future, traveled together in Japan and the US, thinking about how they should tell about the tragedies caused by the atomic bombings in Hiroshima and Nagasaki to the world in the next 100 years. After this trip, Kohira published a book ‘Gembaku no Kiseki’ from the Japanese province of Shogakukan.

Kohira met Tomoyoshi Ezaki, a recording producer, in Vienna. This encounter has led Kohira to do over 200 photo shoots of classic CD jackets.

Kohira also organizes IT forums in Kokura, Kitakyushu, where he was born.

Kohira did the photo shoot for the book cover of Haruki Murakami's book What I Talk About When I Talk About Running.

== Bibliography ==
- 4/524 (a photo collection of the Japan Airlines jumbo jet crash)
- Silicon Road (a collection of PC portraits)
- This Is Nomo (a photo book of Hideo Nomo)
- Gembaku no Kiseki (journey book of tracing tragedies of a-bombings in Hiroshima and Nagasaki: co-authored by Kohira and Paul Saffo)
- Scarecrows in Atlanta, Crocodiles in Alabama (a photo collection of folk arts: co-authored by Kohira and Mizumaru Anzai)
- He Was Born in Memphis (a Trip in the US: co-authored by Kohira and Mizumaru Anzai)
