= Taikichi Irie =

Japanese photographer

Taikichi Irie (入江 泰吉, Irie Taikichi) (November 5, 1905 – January 16, 1992) was a Japanese photographer. He concentrated on Yamatoji (historical sites of Nara Prefecture) and Buddhist statues.

== Biography ==
Irie was born in Nara. He started photography in his teens, influenced by a brother. He began work in a camera store in Osaka in 1925 and in 1931 set up his own company in Osaka, Kōgeisha (光芸社). They did product and advertising photography and sold photographic goods. He started taking photographs of bunraku in 1939 and in 1942 had his first solo exhibition (in Osaka), of bunraku puppets. His house in Osaka was destroyed in a bombing of 1945, and he escaped to his family home in Nara.

Irie's photographs of Buddhist imagery were published as early as the early 1940s, and in 1958 he embarked on what would be a stream of books of such photographs, which had commercial success.

In April 1992, three months after Irie died, a museum largely devoted to his works was set up in Nara, the Irie Taikichi Memorial Museum of Photography Nara City.

== Selected works ==
- Bunraku (文楽). Tokyo: Sōgensha, 1954.
- Tōdaiji (東大寺). Nihon no Tera 1. Tokyo: Bijutsu Shuppansha, 1958.
- Yamatoji (大和路). 2 vols. Tokyo: Sōgensha, 1958, 1960.
- Butsuzō no hyōjō (仏像の表情). Tokyo: Jinbun'ōraisha, 1964.
- Koshiki Yamatoji (古色大和路). Tokyo: Hoikusha, 1971.
- Tōshō Daiji (唐招提寺). Tokyo: Mainichi Shinbunsha, 1973.
- Yamato no matsuri (大和の祭り). Tokyo: Asahi Shinbunsha, 1974.
- (in Japanese) Irie Taikichi (入江泰吉, Taikichi Irie). Nihon no Shashinka 10. Tokyo: Iwanami Shoten, 1997. ISBN 4-00-008350-3. A concise survey.
- Irie Taikichi no Yamatoji (入江泰吉の大和路). Tokyo: Shōgakkan.
  - 1. Koji to mihotoke (古寺とみほとけ). 1996. ISBN 4-09-559301-6.
  - Kodō to nobotoke (古道と野ぼとけ). 1996. ISBN 4-09-559304-0.
