= Daisuke Tsuda =

Daisuke Tsuda may refer to:

- Daisuke Tsuda (musician) (born 1977), vocalist of Maximum the Hormone
- Daisuke Tsuda (journalist) (born 1973), Japanese journalist
