= Miyazaki Yūhi =

Japanese photographer

Miyazaki Yūhi (宮崎 有斐; birth and death years unknown) was a photographer who ran a photographic studio in Tokyo in the 1870s. Two of his photographs were within the collection of the mining engineer Benjamin Smith Lyman and are now within the Tokyo Metropolitan Museum of Photography.
