= Keizō Takagi =

Japanese academic (born 1941)

- 高木 桂蔵
- Born: August 1941 (age 84–85)
- Occupations: Writer, journalist, educator, cultural anthropologist, folklorist, and sociologist
- Writing career
- Subject: Expatriate Chinese communities

Keizō Takagi (高木 桂蔵, Takagi Keizō; born August 1941) is a Japanese writer, journalist, educator, cultural anthropologist, folklorist, and sociologist whose research focuses on expatriate Chinese communities.

As Professor of International Relations at Shizuoka Prefectural University, Takagi regularly appeared on TV programs such as Shizuoka Daiichi Television, and served as Assistant Scoutmaster of Shizuoka Scout Group 42.
