= Kojima Ryūa =

Japanese photographer

Kojima Ryūa (小島 柳蛙; 1820–1882) was a Japanese photographer. He had a studio at Inabaguchi in Gifu. He experimented with forms, including collages where he used his family as models. He also experimented with chemistry.
