= Nogami Tohru =

Japanese photographer

Nogami Tōru (野上 透; born 1935) is a Japanese photographer. His photographs are held in the collections of Nihon University, the Yokohama Civic Art Gallery, and the Tokyo Metropolitan Museum of Photography.
