= Hisaji Shigi =

Hisaji Shigi (信貴 久治, Shigi Hisaji, date of birth and death unknown) is a Japanese businessperson. He was a former yakuza and kumicho (supreme kingpin, or chairman) of the yakuza gang, Hisaji-gumi.

== Career ==
Hisaji Shigi amassed a fortune by managing cabarets and custom shops at Sakai, Osaka. The Hisaji-gumi was disbanded in 1960.

He ran for the 1976 Japanese general election from the 5th Osaka electoral district, aiming for "Tanaka for Izumi" as an independent politician, but lost the election. Electoral fraud would be discovered, and Shigi was arrested for offenses against the Public Office Election Law.

He contested an unsuspended prison sentence to the Supreme Court of Japan just before his confinement, which was after the finalization of his crime, and he would live a fugitive life for about three years until he was taken to custody in Ōita, Japan, in 1996.

Shigi's company had approximately 35 billion yen in debt, and in 1991, it went bankrupt, and Shigi's home was put up for auction.
