= Shisui Tanahashi =

Japanese photographer

Shisui Tanahashi (棚橋 紫水, Tanahashi Shisui; 1906–1991) was a renowned Japanese photographer.
