= Seiyō Ogawa =

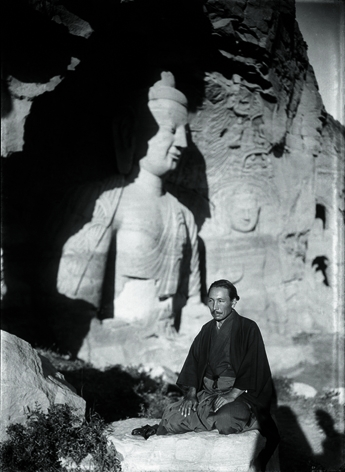
Seiyō Ogawa in front of the Yungang Grottoes

Seiyō Ogawa (小川 晴暘, Ogawa Seiyō; 1894–1960) is a Japanese photographer, printer, and publisher who was a pioneer in photography of Buddhist sculptures and cultural properties in the Taishō and Shōwa eras. The name Seiyō is a pseudonym which was given to him from his master Maruki Riyō; his real name was Seiji (晴二).

== Career ==
Seiyō Ogawa was born in Himeji city in Hyōgo Prefecture in 1894. Though his father's family was of the samurai class, he lost the father in childhood and was brought up by his mother. After graduating from primary school in Himeji, he moved to the house of his mother's cousin, Hino Yūzō, who operated a photo studio in the town Arima. He started helping Hino's work, and learning photography under him. But he had his heart set on becoming a painter. In 1910 he moved to Tokyo to learn the skills of oil painting. In 1911, he was hired at the photo studio of Maruki Riyō. At that time, Maruki was celebrated as the most famous photographer patronized by the Imperial Household, and he was the official photographer of the Emperor Meiji. Ogawa studied photography under Maruki for three years, and was given the name "Seiyō" after "Riyō" when he resigned from Maruki's studio after being drafted.

After serving in the army, he started entering the Bun-ten (文展) Exhibition which was held by the Ministry of Education and Culture. In 1918, his picture Yukidoke no koro (雪解の頃) was accepted for the seventh Bun-ten exhibition. He was also hired by Asahi Newspaper Company as a photographer. He worked at the head office in Osaka and moved to Nara Prefecture, where he took courses in the photography of Buddhist sculptures and other cultural properties.

In 1922, Ogawa quit Asahi and opened a photo studio named Asuka-en (飛鳥園) in Nara, under the suggestion of the renowned art historian Aizu Yaichi who taught at Waseda University in Tokyo. He took photographs of Buddhist sculptures at the old temples in Nara and Kyoto, as well as of ruins in foreign countries, such as the Yungang Grottoes in China; Angkor Wat in Cambodia; and Borobudur and Candi Prambananin in Central Java. Additionally, he established and managed a publishing company called Bukkyō Bijutsu sha (仏教美術社). The company published his book Murō-ji Taikan along with a number of magazines. These publications were primarily on history and art history, and resulted from his many acquaintance with other historians.

His photographs of Buddhist sculpture are famous for their significant power of expression compared to prior photographers. One of his signature techniques was to photograph the sculptures against black backgrounds, making the sculptures stand out against the darkness.

== Books ==
- (in Japanese) Ueno Naoaki, Ogawa Seiyō, "Jō-dai no Chōkoku (上代の彫刻)", Asahi Shimbun sha, Tokyo, 1942
- (in Japanese) Ogawa Seiyō, "Daido Unko no Seki-Butsu", Ars sha, Tokyo, 1942
- (in Japanese) Ogawa Seiyō, "Unkō no Sekkutsu", Shinchōsha, Tokyo, 1978
