= Museum of Modern Art, Saitama =

Museum

Coordinates: 35.8696°N 139.6431°E

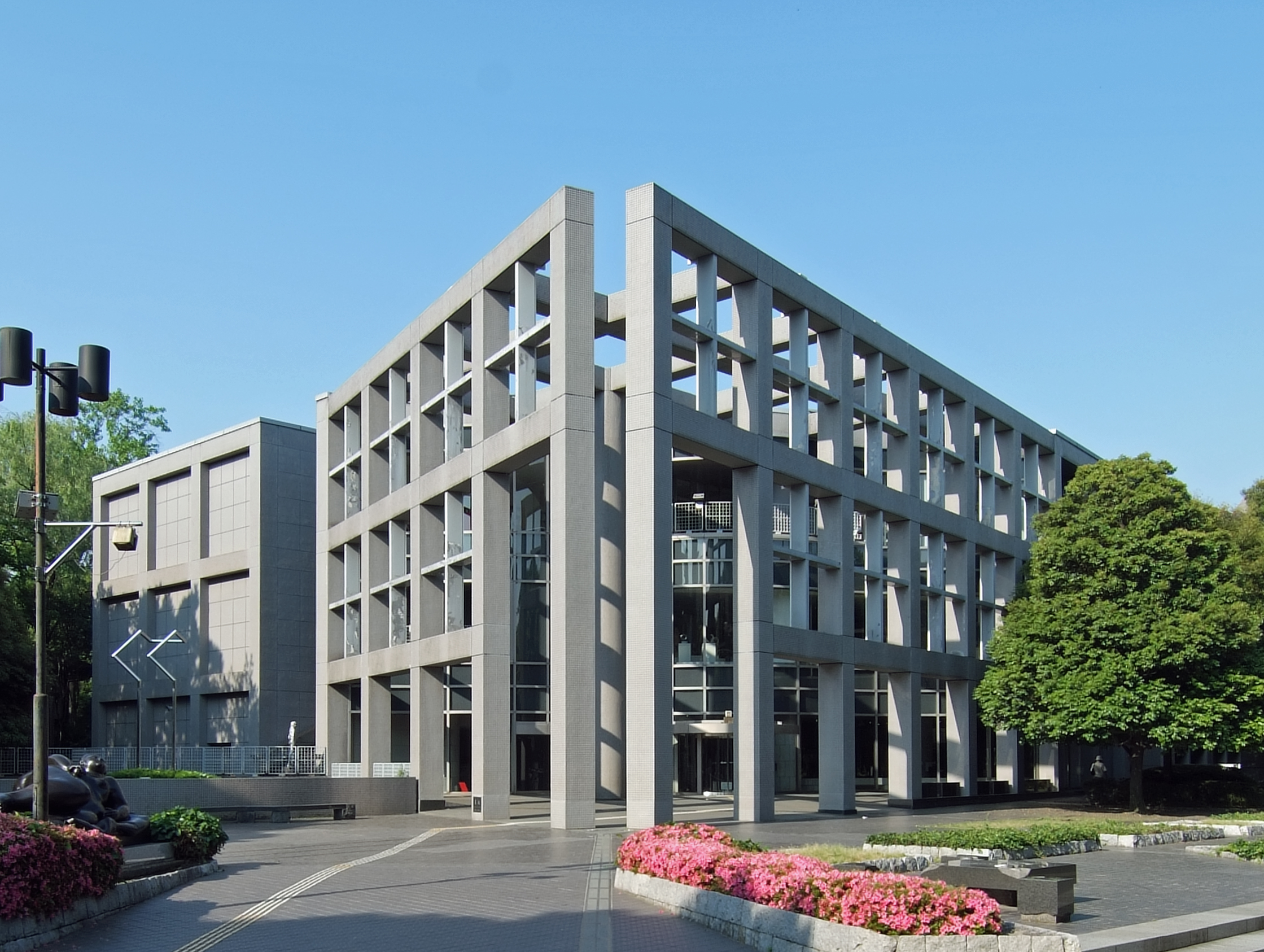
Museum of Modern Art, Saitama

The Museum of Modern Art, Saitama (埼玉県立近代美術館, Saitama Kenritsu Kindai Bijutsukan) is a museum in Saitama, Saitama Prefecture, Japan. It is one of Japan's many museums that are supported by a prefecture.
