= Kaietsu Takagi =

Japanese photographer

Kaietsu Takagi (高木 契〓, Takagi Kaietsu; 1883–1957) was a Japanese photographer.

After studying at Waseda University, Takagi joined Ōkura-gumi (大倉組) and in 1907 went to New York to head the company's office there. While in New York, he met Shinzō Fukuhara, and became interested in photography.

Among Takagi's work are some autochromes.
