= Noriyoshi Shibata =

Japanese photographer

Noriyoshi Shibata or Nori Shibata (柴田 のりよし, Shibata Noriyoshi) is a Japanese photographer who specializes in documenting Tibet and China.

Shibata was born in Nagasaki in 1966. After graduating from Keio University (Tokyo) in 1990 he joined Kyodo News, but he left and turned freelance in 1995.

Shibata's photographs of Tibet have appeared in his book Tibetans; those of China and Northern Ireland have appeared in photographic magazines.

== Exhibitions ==
- "Lhasa", Wakita Gallery (Nagoya), 1993.
- "Shangri-La at the End of a Century" (秘境の世紀末). Kodak Photo Salon (Ginza, Tokyo), 1997.
- "The Land of Kesar" (ケサルの楽土). Minolta Photo Space (Shinjuku, Tokyo), 1998.
- "Tibetans". Nikon Salon (Shinjuku, Tokyo), 2005.
- "Alley Theater in Canton" (広東路地裏劇場). Olympus Gallery (Kanda, Tokyo), 2005.
- "Children from a Village of Acrobats" (雑技の郷の子供たち). Konica Minolta Plaza (Shinjuku, Tokyo), 2007.
- "Back-Street Mandala" (路地裏マンダラ). Nikon Salon (Shinjuku, Tokyo), 2007.
- "Pre-Olympic Beijing" (五輪前 北京). Konica Minolta Plaza (Shinjuku, Tokyo), 2008.

== Book ==
- Tibetans. Hakodate: Mole, 2002. ISBN 4-938628-48-1.
