= Tomio Kondō =

Japanese photographer

Tomio Kondō (近藤 福雄, Kondō Tomio; January 24, 1900 – November 15, 1957) was an amateur photographer who lived on and energetically photographed Sado island in the Sea of Japan.

Kondō was born to a landowning family in Kanazawa village (subsequently part of Kanai, which in turn was amalgamated within "Sado City"). He started with a camera at 18, and also had a keen interest in archaeology. Kondō photographed landscapes and a great variety of life on the island, as well as the figures from literary and artistic circles on the mainland who came to visit during the infancy of Sado's tourism industry. He financed this by gradually selling off land owned by the family.

Kondō was keen to keep up with the latest news on the island. He helped set up the Sado museum (佐渡博物館, Sado Hakubutsukan), of which he became a trustee, and organizations devoted to mountain walking and botany.

Kondō left a collection of about 8,840 plates on his death. These were bought by the bus company Niigata Kōtsū (新潟交通), which presented them to the Sado museum, but they were little known until 1979, when they were seen by Haruo Tomiyama (himself a notable photographer of Sado) and others. Four years later they became an Asahi Camera cover story, and thanks to the effort of Tomiyama and others they have been exhibited in Sado and anthologized in two books. The photographs then had some exposure in the general-interest media; for example, the 17 August 1995 issue of the magazine Serai (サライ, Sarai) had a six-page feature on them.

Sado City has recently started a photography contest in Kondō's honour.

== Books of Kondō's works ==
- Sado (佐渡). Iwanami Shashin Bunko 73. Tokyo: Iwanami Shoten, 1952. Kondō is listed as one of two individual photographers who photographed the content with three organizations.(in Japanese)
- Sado mangekyō (佐渡万華鏡), ed. Haruo Tomiyama. Matsumoto: Kyōdo Shuppansha (郷土出版社), 1994. ISBN 4-87663-264-2. A generous anthology of Kondō's work, showing family life, farming, tourism, new technology, popular spectacles, and much else. (in Japanese)
- Sado shashinchō (佐渡写真帖), ed. Hisao Kondō (近藤 寿雄) and Kinzō Isobe (磯部 欣三). Matsumoto: Kyōdo Shuppansha (郷土出版社), 2000. ISBN 4-87663-489-0. (in Japanese)
