= Yoho Tsuda =

Japanese photographer

- Born: April 4, 1923
- Died: 2014 (age 91)
- Occupation: Photographer
- Organization: Naniwa Photography Club

Yoho Tsuda (津田 洋甫, Tsuda Yōho; 4 April 1923 – 2014) was a post–World War II Japanese photographer. He was born in Nara Prefecture to an affluent family. He followed his father's advice to become an engineer and enrolled at the Yoshino Technical High School. He continued his education in engineering at Tokyo Industrial Arts High School but later transferred to Nihon University's College of Art to major in film. After he was conscripted in World War 2, he decided to do photography.

After studying briefly at the Osaka College of Photographic Arts, Tsuda began to work at a photography studio, which like many at the time specialized in portraits. In 1948, he joined the Naniwa Photography Club. His early photography was concerned with construction and abstraction and was associated with the emergence of subjective photography in postwar Japan.

Around 1966, Tsuda began concentrating on the Japanese natural landscape, with trees and water becoming recurring subjects in his photography. This work resulted in photobooks including Jumoku sansui (樹木讃水, 1980) and Poems of Trees (1980). His later exhibitions included Mizu o utau (水を謳う, 1982), Nagi (なぎ, 1985), and Mizu no uta (水の詩, 1988). He later served as chairman of the Naniwa Photography Club.

Tsuda's early works can be characterized with his concern for construction and abstraction in the vein of subjective photography. But his later works focus more on expressing a humanistic narrative focused on nature.

Tsuda's works are included in the permanent collections of the Metropolitan Museum of Art (five prints), the J. Paul Getty Museum (one print), Nara City Museum of Photography, and the Tokyo Photographic Art Museum (five prints).
