= Iwata Nakayama =

Japanese photographer (1895–1949)

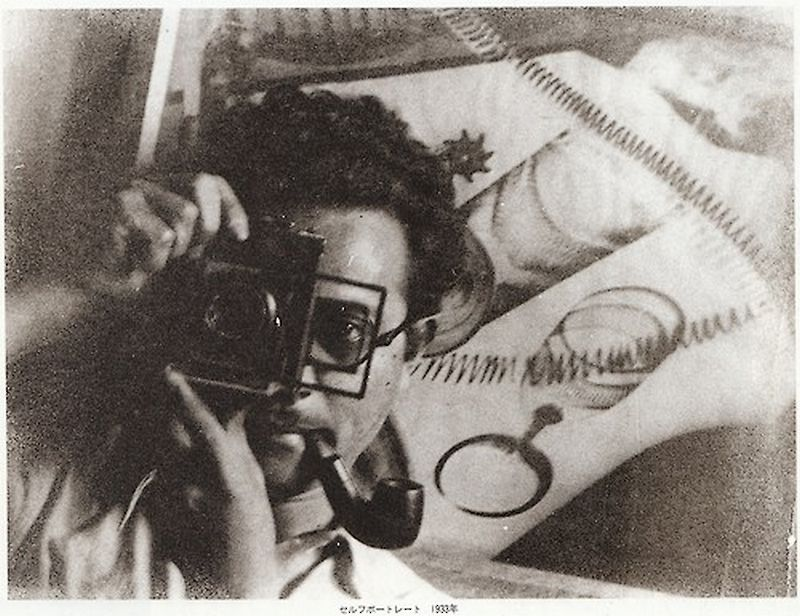
- Born: August 3, 1895; Fukuoka, Japan
- Died: January 20, 1949 (aged 53)
- Education: Tokyo University of Arts
- Movement: Japanese New Photography Movement
- Spouse: Nakayama Masako

Iwata Nakayama (中山 岩太, Nakayama Iwata; August 3, 1895 – January 20, 1949) was a Japanese avant-garde photographer.

Nakayama was born in Yanagawa, Fukuoka (Japan). His wife, Nakayama Masako (中山正子) became an English language educator after their years aboard. His father was an inventor who held a patent for a fire extinguisher. Iwata moved to Tokyo and was educated at the private school Kyohoku-Chūgakkō. After graduating, he entered Tokyo University of the Arts as the first student of its photography course. After learning artistic and commercial techniques there, he moved to the United States in 1918 as an overseas student of California State University, sent by the Japanese government. However he quit studying and began to work at a photo studio run by Tōyō Kikuchi (菊池東陽) in New York City.

== Years Abroad in New York and Paris ==
With his practical skills, he established his own studio, Laquan Studio, on the fashionable 5th Avenue and found success as a professional portrait photographer. In New York City, he had contact with several other Japanese painters such as Toshi Shimizu. He also had a relationship with Japanese German American poet Sadakichi Hartmann who was also very active as a photo critic, publishing in Camera Note and Camera Work edited by Alfred Stieglitz. Nakayama took several portraits of Hartmann. The grittiness of Nayakama's urbanscape photographs of New York City, quite a contrast with his earlier dreamlike landscapes, might be attributed to his contact with Hartmann who had a reputation as the "King of Bohemia" in the Greenwich Village. Curator of Shoto Museum of Art, Yuri Mitsuda says that, "Perhaps the most significant influence that Nakayama acquired from the talented and rebellious Sadakichi was a sincere commitment to art and a critical spirit, which he would display in his later years."

French Indian dancer Nyota Inoyka, whom Nakayama met in New York, convinced him to move to Paris. He sold his photography studio, Laquan Studio, and he arrived in Paris in 1926 where he worked as a commercial photographer for 15 years. He lived in the Montparnasse area of the city and had interactions with fellow Japanese expatriate painters Tsuguhara Foujita, Kinosuke Ebihara, Futurist painter Enrico Prampolini, and Surrealist Photographer Man Ray. Nakayama published photographs of Prampolini's performance, Futurist Pantomime, in Kōga (光画) in 1933. He also brought some of Man Ray's work back to Japan to exhibit with the Ashiya Camera Club. These two artists in particular were a strong influence on him during his years in Paris.

In 1927, the family traveled to Berlin and Spain before returning to Japan later that year on the Trans-Siberian Express.

== Return to Japan ==
After returning to Japan, he became professional photographer in Kobe and helped propel Japanese avant-garde photography. He established the Ashiya Camera Club (芦屋 カメラクラブ) with Kanbei Hanaya and Beniya Kichinosuke. He became one of the central figures in the Japanese New Photography (新興写真) Movement in the Kansai area. He released some works in such magazines as Asahi Camera and Nihon Shashin Nenkan (日本写真年鑑).

Nakayama published a manifesto upon returning to Japan in which he stated his commitment to “Pure Art Photography” in Asahi Camera (January 1928). He wanted to create something “that only photography can produce.” This marked a shift in his photographic approach as he began to incorporate more negatives into his compositions, similar to Man Ray and Laszlo Moholy-Nagy’s photogram technique. Curator of Shoto Museum of art, Yuri Mitsuda writes that Nakayama's technique was different in that it “consisted of repeatedly superimposing the same image, but he did not use the techniques of multiple exposures or chrono-photography."

In 1932, Nakayama established the monthly magazine Kōga (光画) with Yasuzō Nojima and Nobuo Ina. The magazine was a critical turning point in Japanese artistic photography. Nakayama was a pioneer of Japanese avant-garde photography and inspired many Japanese photographers through his works.

It was around this time that the European New Photography movement, which Moholy-Nagy, El Lissitzky, and Albert Renger Patzsch were considered the forerunners, started to appear in the Photo Times journal. When the German Film und Foto exhibition was held in Tokyo and Osaka, the Avant-garde photography started to become recognized and the Ashiya Camera Club was praised. But Nakayama himself was critical of this superficial interest in the New Photography Movement, he wrote, “New Photography is just a name for the careless and jumbled combination of motifs such as slanted chimneys, cut-off buildings and unplessant close-ups.” He felt much of the photography in Japan lacked individuality and were merely imitations of European New Photography. Yuri Mitsuda writes that Nakayama grappled with

the complex attitude he held towards Western art. Precisely because Nakayama had first-hand knowledge of both American and European art, he showed great restraint in refraining from imitating them. Further, he resented Japan’s apparent inability to create something modern that was not an imitation of foreign models. Many of his contemporaries sought modern interpretations of traditional Japanese arts, but he wasn’t interested in this approach. Nakayama was determined to stand on equal footing with European and America artists and to invent something novel.

During the years that he worked on Kōga, Nakayama developed unique composite photography techniques. He described his goal in an essay he published in Asahi Camera, that he wanted to "create a scene through the hallucinogen of photography that could never be witnessed in real life." Seashells and seahorses seem to float in midair in his most experimental work. Nakayama experimented by using several different plates to print these experimental photographs. In the studio, he would also use a glass table, putting objects above and below the glass to play with depth, and he would also use mirrors to create shadows and reflections.

Nakayama became more experimental in his expression, in contrast to the macro-level changes happening to photography in Japan. As Japan became more militaristic and involved itself in conflicts with the Soviet Union and China in the 1930s, the opinion that photography should capture reality and be used for journalistic reporting became dominant. Other experimental photographers who were involved in the New Photography movement shifted their efforts back to this photojournalistic approach. As this photojournalism in Japan became steeped in wartime ideology, Nakayama continued to pursue his avant-garde expression during the lean years of the war.

After the war, Nakayama took some photos of the Kobe area that had been destroyed in the air raids but his post war activities were cut short. He suffered a stroke and died on January 20, 1949, at the age of 53. His wife Masako mentions in her biography that he had started drinking alcohol. It was just a few days after he was selected as a trustee of the Japanese Photography Association.

Throughout the 1960s and 1970s, as the academic discipline of Japanese Photography expanded, Nakayama's works were rediscovered and researched. Nakayama's works are included in the permanent collections of Modern Museum of Art in New York, United States; The British Museum in London, England; and the Tokyo Photographic Art Museum, Tokyo, Japan.

== Selected photos ==
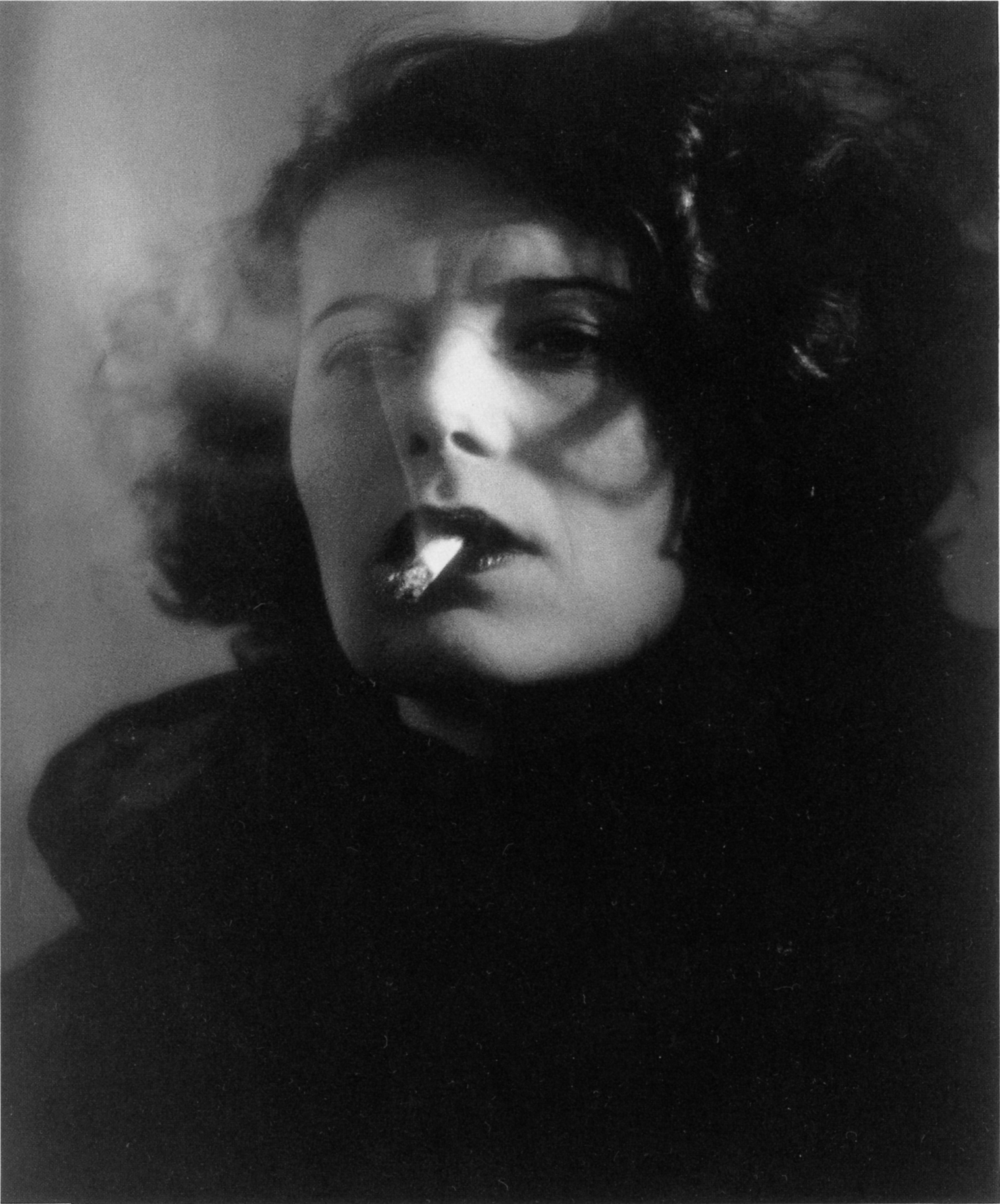
A woman from Shanghai

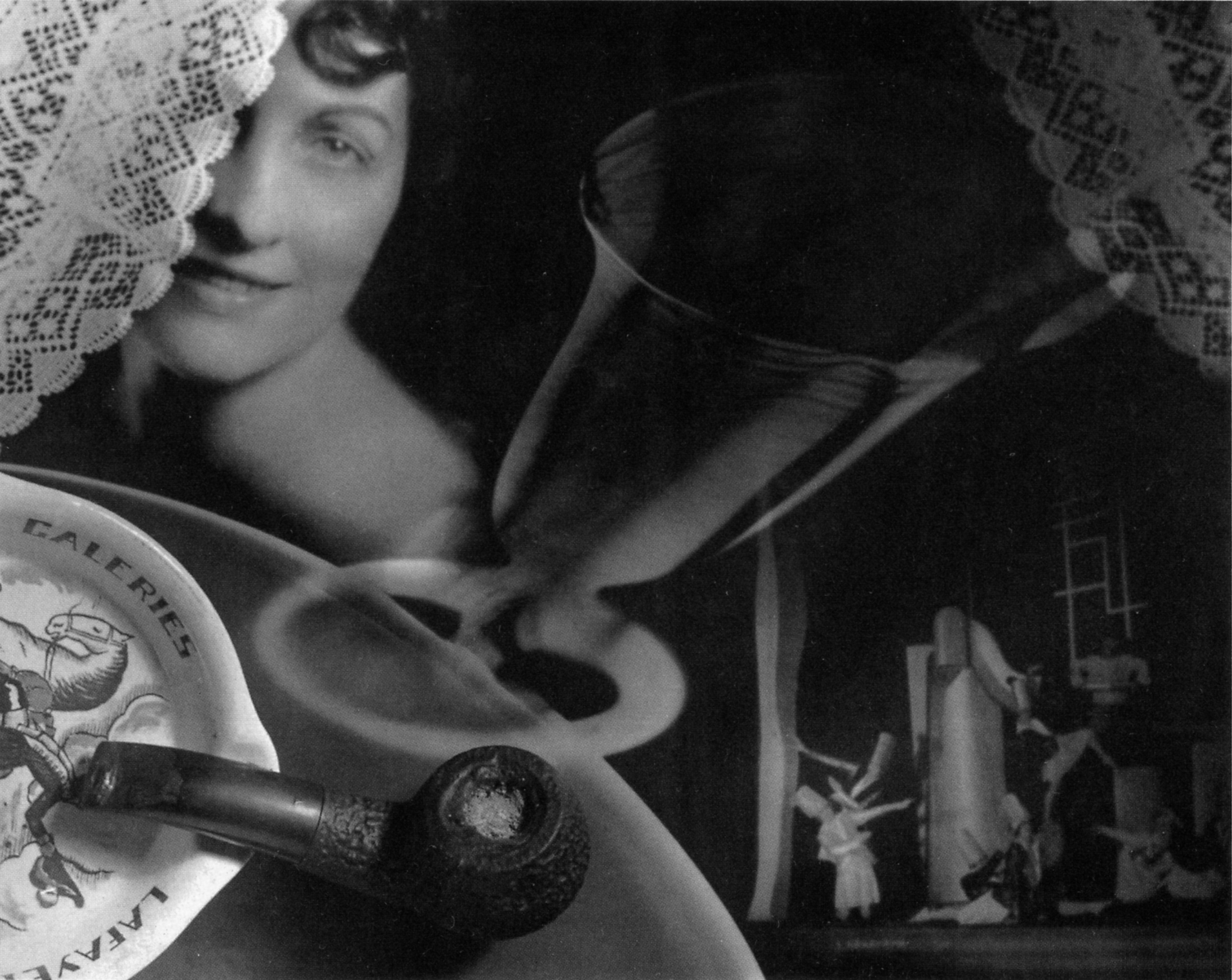
Untitled

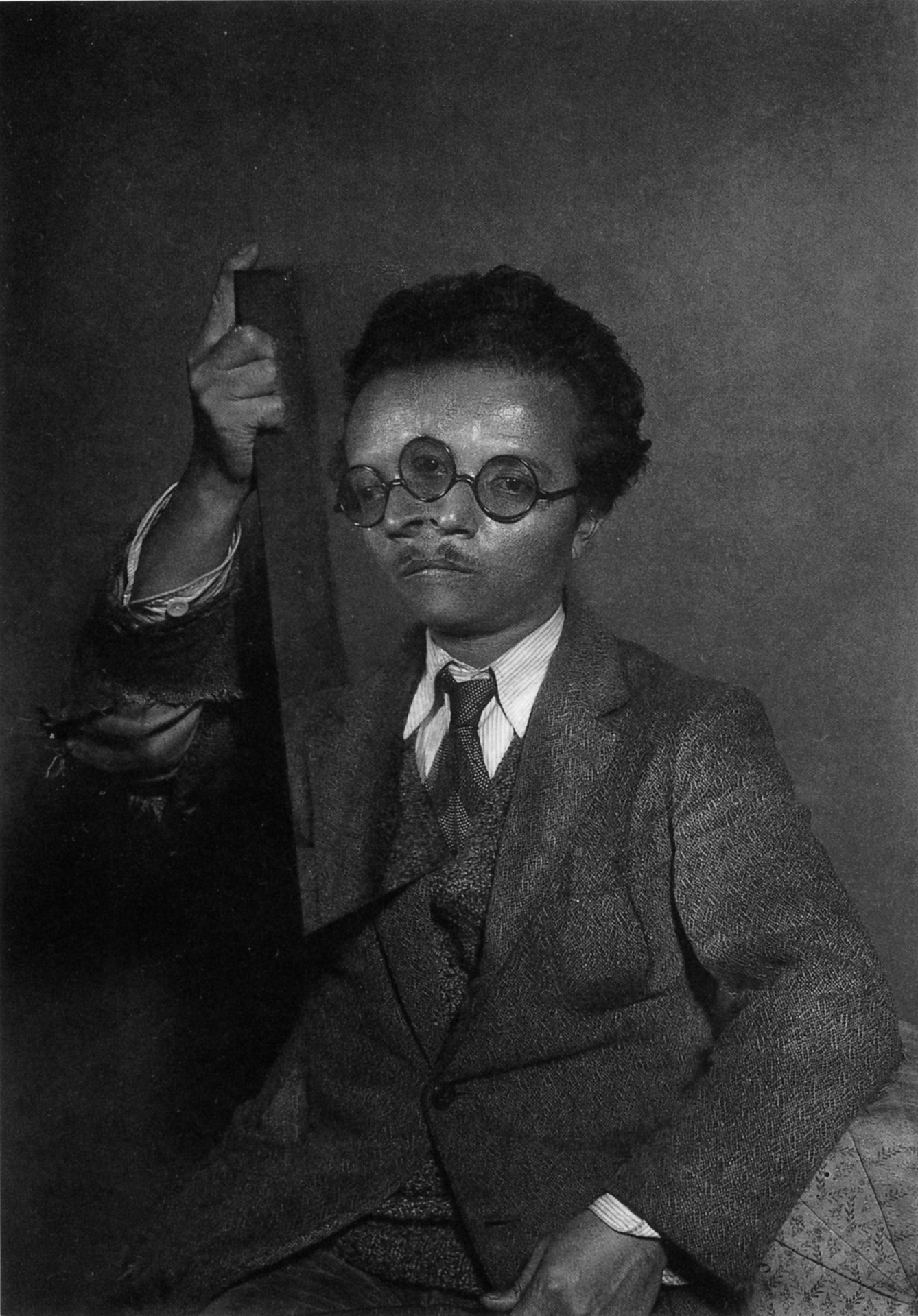
Self-portrait

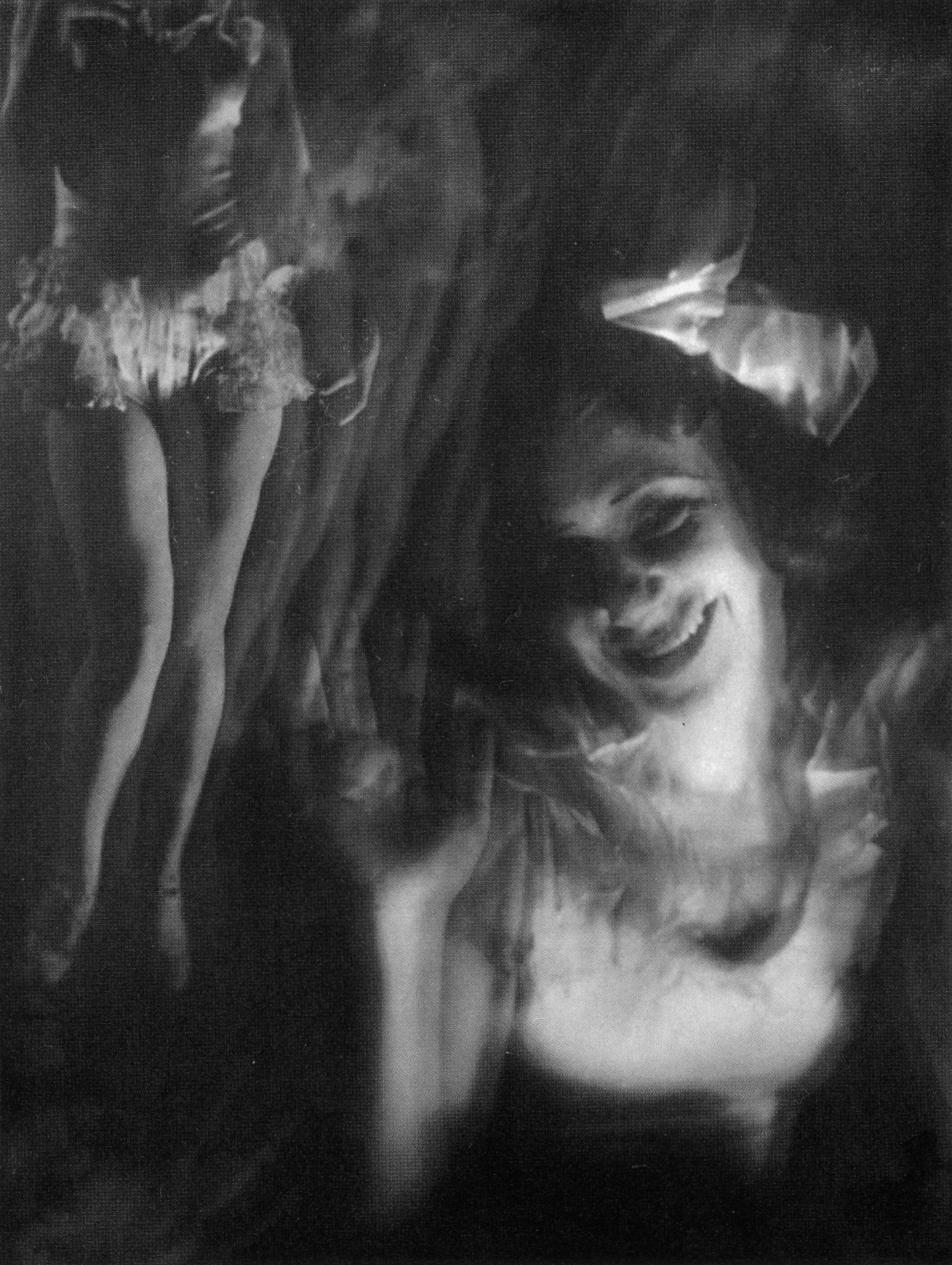
・・・・

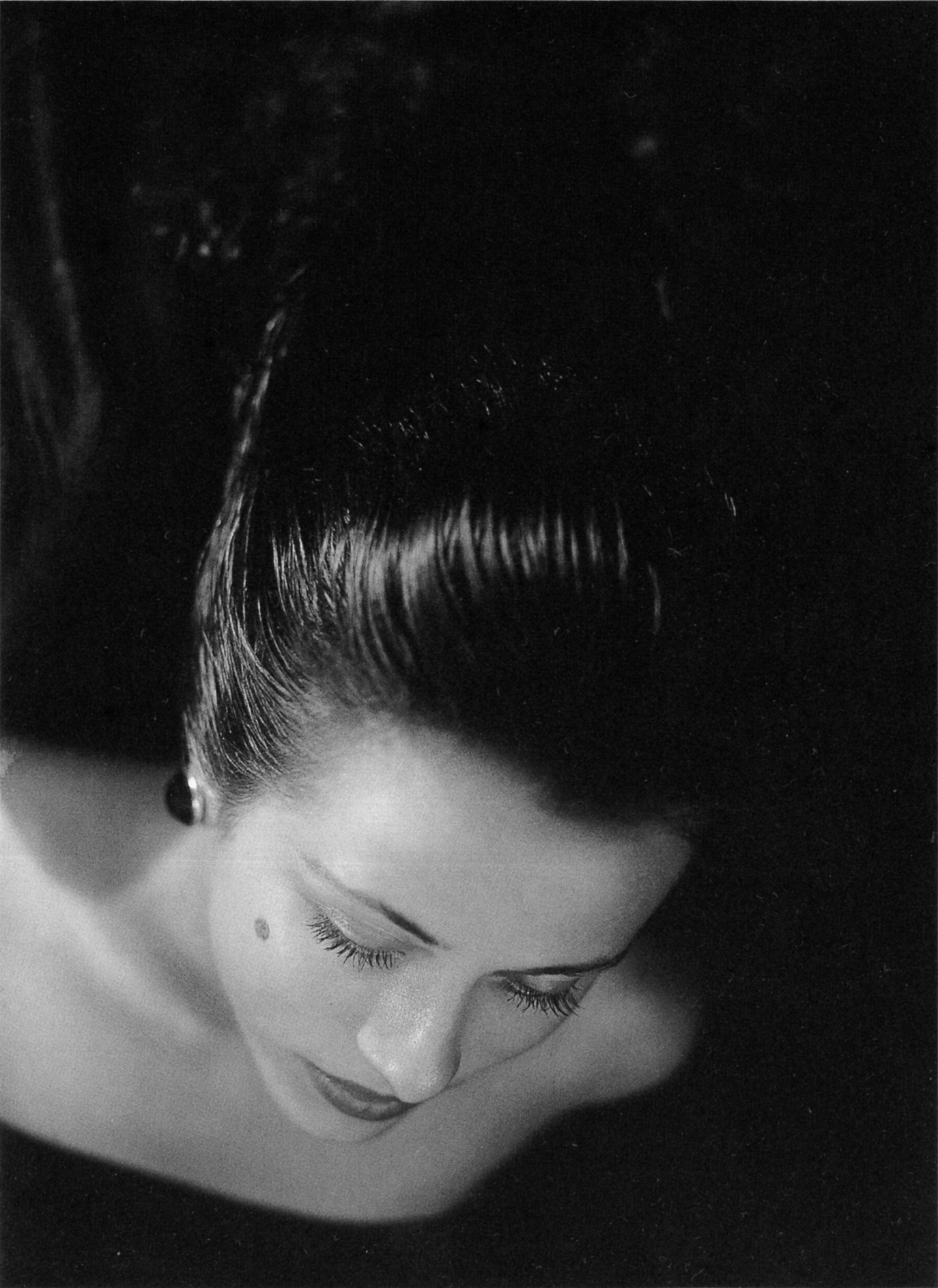
A woman with long hair

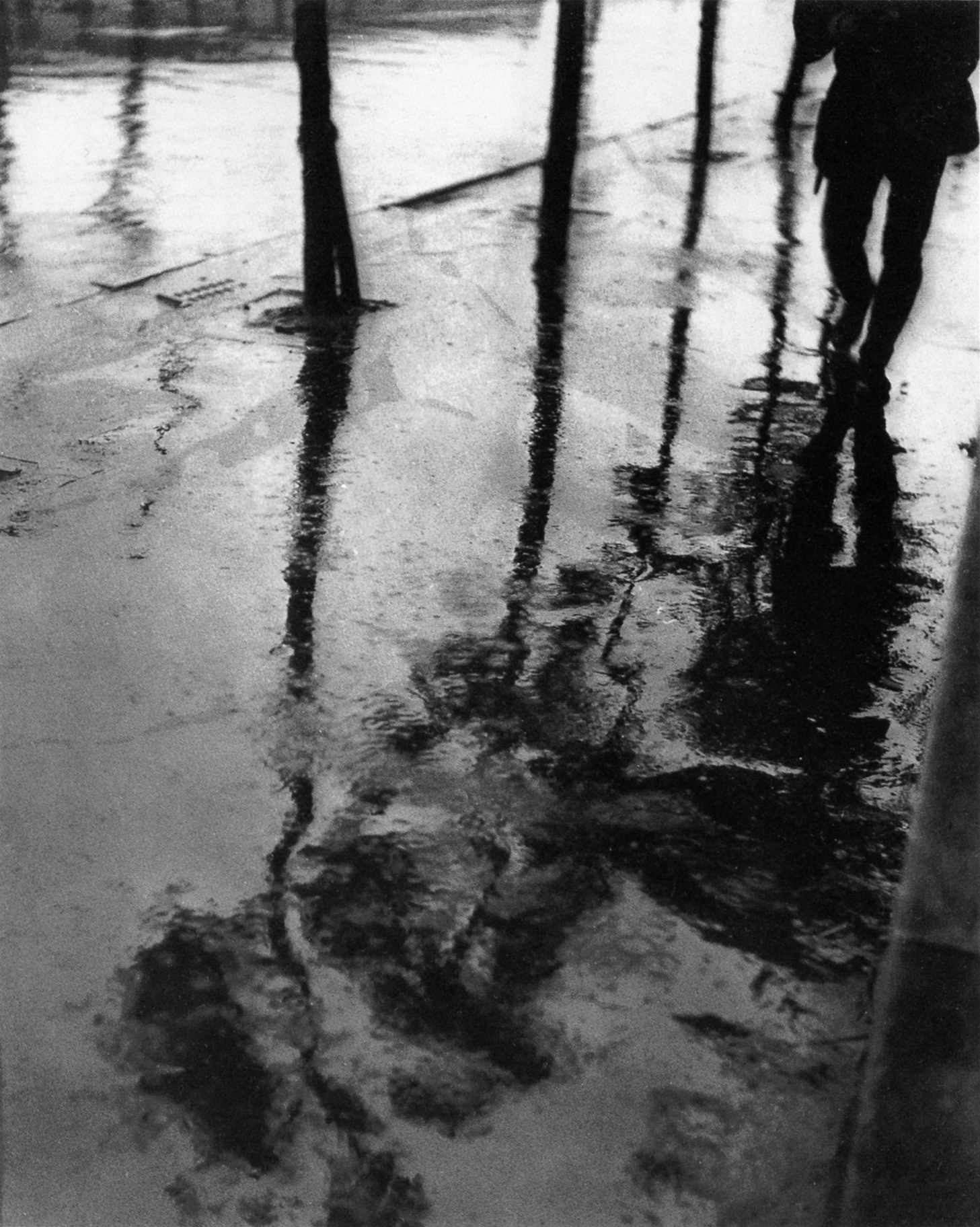
Rain ⑵

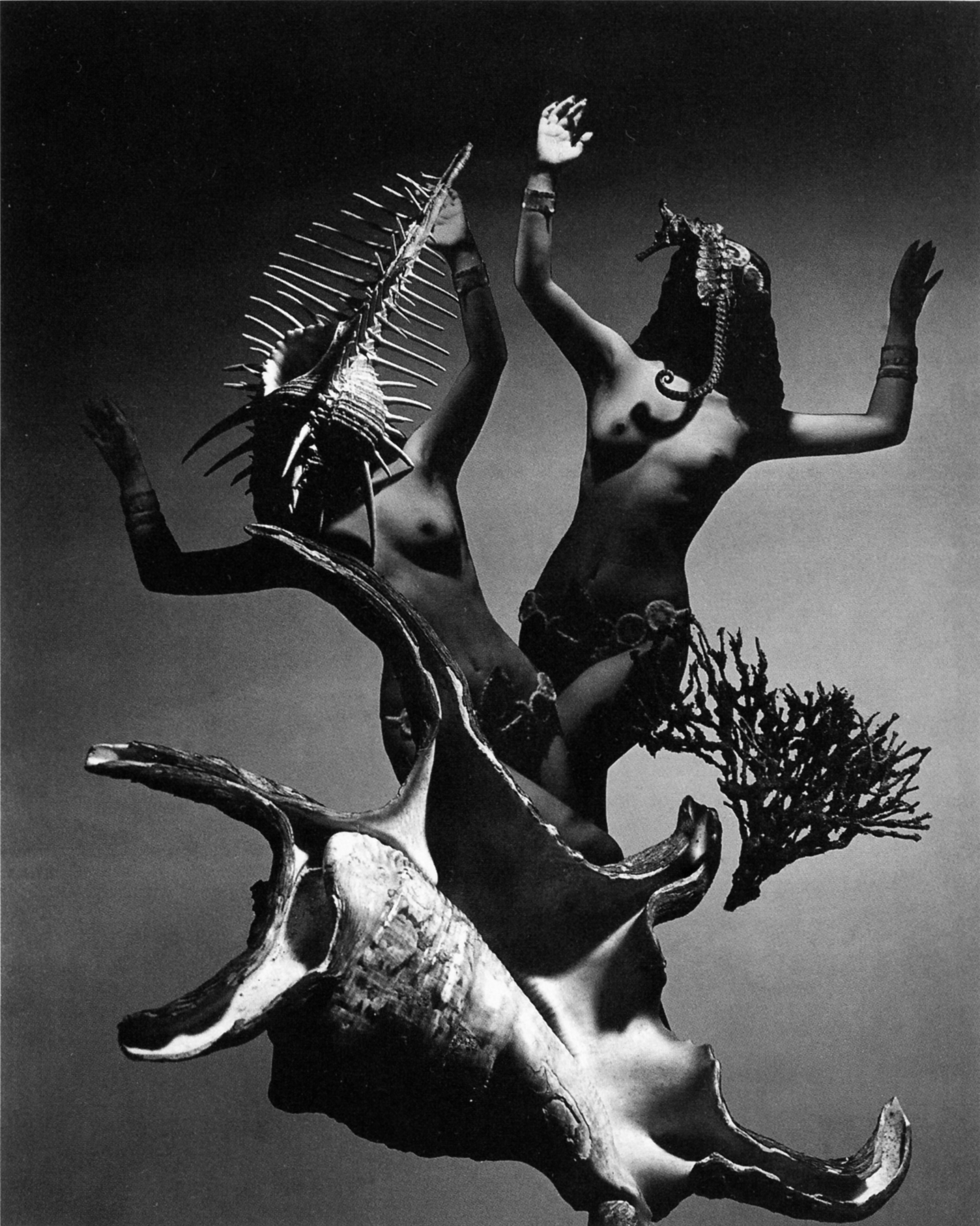
Festival of the Demon
