= Hisaji Hara =

Japanese photographer

- Born: 1964 (age 61–62); Tokyo
- Education: Musashino Art University
- Known for: Photography
- Movement: Contemporary art

Hisaji Hara is a Japanese photographer.

== Biography ==
Hisaji Hara was born in Tokyo in 1964 and graduated from Musashino Art University in 1986. He emigrated to the United States in 1993, working as a film director. He returned to Japan in 2001.

=== Influences ===
Hara has explicitly named Russian director Andrei Tarkovsky as a prominent influence in his work.

== Technique ==
Hara primarily works with purposefully aged black-and-white photographs; in order to create photos that "enjoy the diversity of time." Hara is primarily known for his series of photographic Balthus studies.

== Exhibitions ==
- Picture, Photography and Beyond (September 3 – October 2, 2011)
