= Akito Tsuda =

Japanese photographer

- 津田 明人
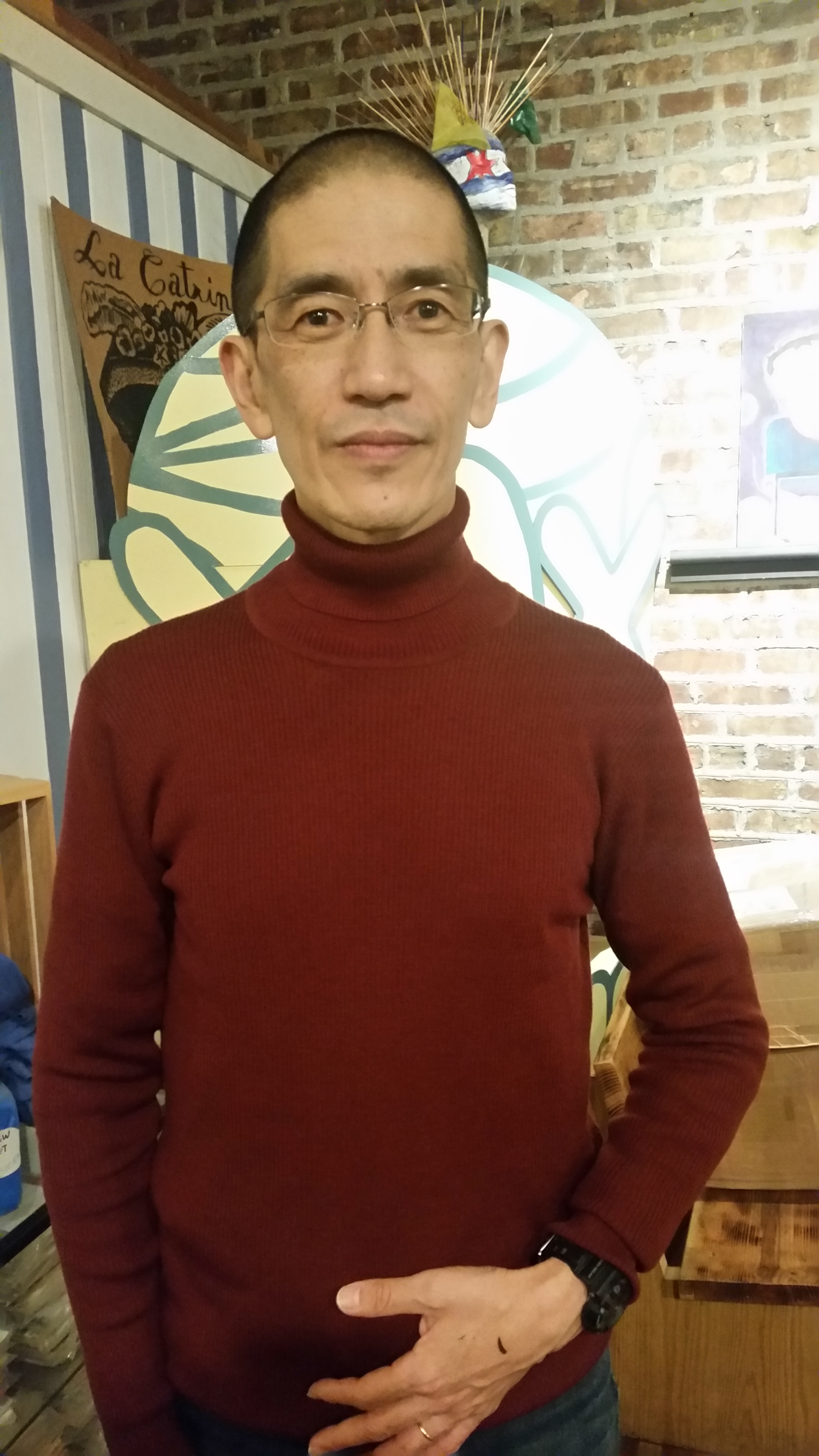
- Tsuda at 2017 exhibition of Pilsen Days at La Catrina Cafe in Chicago
- Born: 1966 (age 59–60); Hamamatsu, Japan
- Education: Columbia College Chicago
- Occupation: Photographer
- Notable work: Pilsen Days
- Website: akitotsuda.wixsite.com/akitotsuda

Akito Tsuda (津田 明人, Tsuda Akito; born 1966) is a Japanese photographer. Tsuda has published works focused on subjects in Chicago, Osaka, and Tokyo. His work has been exhibited in Japan, Italy, and the United States. He has been recognized for his work documenting the Latino residents of the Pilsen neighborhood of Chicago in the early 1990s.

== Life and work ==
Tsuda was born in 1966 in Hamamatsu in Shizuoka Prefecture in Japan.

In 1989, Tsuda left Japan for the United States on a work visa, and lived in Winnetka, Illinois for a short time. He then moved to the Pilsen neighborhood of Chicago and studied photography at Columbia College Chicago. One of Tsuda's school projects at Columbia was to document his neighborhood, and his work depicted some of the streets between Halsted Street to Western Avenue and 16th Street to Cermak Road. These works were first made available in a self-published book called made me better than before, which had limited circulation and promptly sold out. Tsuda created a second edition of the book called Pilsen Days in 2016 after getting feedback from Pilsen residents.

Tsuda’s long-term engagement with the Pilsen community was discussed in a 2024 Forbes article by Esther Choy concerning trust-building and documentary practice.

== Exhibitions and collections ==
Tsuda's work has been exhibited in Milan, Tokyo, and Chicago. In May 2001, Tsuda won the Hitotsuboten, a Tokyo-based annual contest for graphic design and photography for his solo exhibition titled Robō no Neko (路傍の猫; trans. "Street Cat").

Other notable exhibitions of his work have included:

- Still Motion: Truth, Memory, and Image in East Asia — University of Chicago, 2018.
- Exhibit: Akito Tsuda: Pilsen Days. Chicago Public Library. 7 May 2024.
- Akito Tsuda: Pilsen Days — Harold Washington Library Center, Chicago Public Library, June 2024–April 2025.

Collections of his work are held by the Chicago Public Library in Harold Washington Library Center's Special Collections and by the Kiyosato Museum of Photographic Art (K*MoPA), Japan.

== Selected publications ==
- Tsuda, Akito. Pilsen Days (2017)
- Tsuda, Akito. Chicago 1994 (2018)
- Tsuda, Akito. Pilsen Days: A Neighborhood Story (2022)
