= Kiyoshi Koishi =

Japanese photographer

- 小石 清
- Born: 26 April 1908; Osaka, Japan
- Died: 7 July 1957 (aged 49); Mojishi, Fukuoka, Japan
- Occupation: Photographer

Kiyoshi Koishi (小石 清, Koishi Kiyoshi) (March 26, 1908 - July 7, 1957) was a renowned Japanese photographer. He was best known for his surrealist and avant-garde works as a member of the Naniwa Photography Club.

== Biography ==
=== Early life (1908 - 1931) ===
Kiyoshi Koishi was born in Osaka in 1908. He began studying photography when he became employed at a photography supply house, Asanuma Shokai, after graduating secondary school. He joined the Naniwa Photography Club in 1928 as an amateur photographer during the rise of the Shinko Shashin (新興写真, New Photography) movement in Japan.

Koishi began experimenting with more modernist photographic techniques and at the 19th Namiten (Naniwa Photography Club exhibition) held in August 1930, Koishi exhibited Susume (進め, March On!). This photograph employed intentional camera movement and pushed the boundaries of conventional photography. Alongside other surrealist inspired works presented at the exhibition, this marked the beginning of the club’s stylistic shift away from the more standard pictorial photography that was popular in Japan at the time.

Alongside his experiments in the avant-garde, Koishi also worked in advertising photography. In 1931 he established the Koishi Ad Photo Studio. In the same year, his work for Club Soap won him first place at the second International Advertising Photography Exhibition.

=== Avant-garde work (1932 - 1944) ===
At the 21st Namiten, held in Tokyo in 1932, Koishi debuted an exhibition of 10 photographs, each paired with a short poem, titled Shoka Shinkei (初夏神経, Early Summer Nerves), presented as an experiment in new photography. This work showcased Koishi’s skill with a variety of alternative photographic techniques with a focus on photomontage and photograms. The photos featured modernist compositions, abstract subjects, and multi-layered exposures, a stark contrast from the realism focused journalistic photography that was popular in Tokyo. The collection was published as a photobook by the Naniwa Shashin Club the following year, allowing Koishi’s unconventional work to reach a larger audience.

Shoka Shinkei garnered a variety of reactions throughout Japan. Though it was met with praise by the Naniwa Shashin Club and other photographers in the Kansai region for his impressive use of technique, Koishi received much more critical reviews from Tokyo-based artists, considering the photos to be too abstract and lacking in reality. Iwao Yamawaki, a Bauhaus trained photographer, criticized the “pointless, Dada-like style” and argued that Koishi “ran the risk of indulging in eroticism and the grotesque.” Ina Nobuo, writing for Kōga, described the pairing of photography and poetry as ‘confusing.’

In response to these criticisms, Koishi argued that Tokyo photography critics were too removed from the practice of photography and derided their "fragmented, mechanical analysis". Koishi believed that the world of surrealism was the answer to photography being grounded in realism, an idea that he felt was outdated, and urged photographers to "pursue the expression of a new sensibility that lies on the far shores of realism.”

Koishi, in 1936, wrote and published a book titled Satsuei: Sakuga no Shingihō (撮影・作畫の新技法, Shooting: A New Method for Composition). This book was a compilation of different photographic techniques Koishi had experimented with, intended as a technical guide for aspiring amateur photographers. He covers a variety of different methods, including various ways to produce a photomontage, photograms, solarized photos, multiple exposure and infrared photography.

After the outbreak of the Second Sino-Japanese War, Koishi was commissioned by the Cabinet Information Bureau in 1938 to photograph the warfront in China. Despite working as a war photographer producing press photos for the Japanese military, Koishi continued to practice his avant-garde photography while stationed in China. Once returning to Japan in 1940, Koishi presented a new series of photos at the 29th Namiten. A collection of recompositions of photographs he took while abroad, Han Sekai (半世界, Half World), offered a sympathetic view of the occupied Chinese territory. Though more grounded in reality than his prior exhibitions, the photographs showcased surreal, melancholy subjects and seemed to evoke an anti-war sentiment. One photo of an elephant and a dove, a symbol of peace, is heavily distorted, while another photo features an abandoned baby carriage amidst the flooded ruins of a city.

Koishi's interwar work was later revisited in the Osaka section of the Tokyo Photographic Art Museum exhibition Avant-Garde Rising: The Photographic Vanguard in Modern Japan, which included him among the photographers representing the Kansai avant-garde and illustrated his Fatigue from the series Drunken Dream (1936).

=== Post-war career (1945 - 1957) ===
In 1945, his house in Osaka burned down, destroying his negatives. Koishi then relocated to Mojishi, Fukuoka Prefecture (now Moji-ku, Kitakyūshū) and opened his own camera store, Koishi Camera. He continued work as a photographer, though his output slowed down. Nakato Atsuo, a fellow photographer from the Naniwa Photography Club, wrote that Koishi's work didn't seem to be doing well after the war and felt that Koishi had "lost the desire and dream to create as he had in the past." In 1946 he won first prize in the first New Japan Tourism Photography Contest, sponsored by the Japan Travel Bureau. In 1948 he produced the gravure pages for a popular magazine, Shosetsu Shincho. He went on to serve as a director for several regional and national photography associations in Japan. In 1954 Koishi had a solo exhibition at the Matsushi ma Gallery in Tokyo.

Koishi died on July 7th, 1957, after hitting his head during an accidental fall inside of Moji Station.

== Exhibition in Japan ==
- Kiyoshi Koishi and Naniwa Shashin Club (小石清と浪華写真倶楽部展) at Hyogo Prefectural Museum of Modern Art (兵庫県立近代美術館) and Seibu Contemporary Art Gallery (西武百貨店コンテンポラリーアートギャラリー), 1988

== References and further reading ==
- Kaneko Ryūichi. Modern Photography in Japan 1915-1940. San Francisco: Friends of Photography, 2001. ISBN 0-933286-74-0
- (in Japanese) Koishi Kiyoshi. Shoka Shinkei (初夏神経, Early Summer Nerves, 1933. Republished by Kokushokankōkai in 2005 with short English commentary. ISBN 4-336-04485-6
- (in Japanese) Exhibition Catalogue for "Kiyoshi Koishi and Naniwa Shashin Club" (Hyogo Prefectural Museum of Modern Art and Seibu Contemporary Art Gallery, 1988) (no ISBN)
- (in Japanese) Koishi Kiyoshi to zen'ei shashin (小石清と前衛写真, "Kiyoshi Koishi and avant-garde photography"). Nihon no Shashinka (日本の写真家), vol. 15. Tokyo: Iwanami, 1999. ISBN 4-00-008355-4
- Tucker, Anne Wilkes, et al. The History of Japanese Photography. New Haven: Yale University Press, 2003. ISBN 0-300-09925-8

== See also ==
- Photography
- List of photographers
