= Kaneyoshi Tabuchi =

Japanese photographer

Kaneyoshi Tabuchi (田渕 銀芳, Tabuchi Kaneyoshi; 1917–1997) was a renowned Japanese photographer.

He was among the photographers included in the Osaka section of the 2022 Tokyo Photographic Art Museum exhibition Avant-Garde Rising: The Photographic Vanguard in Modern Japan.
