= Photography in Japan =

The history of photography in Japan begins in the 19th century and has continued to be a prominent art form into the present era.

== 19th-century ==
=== Importation of photography ===
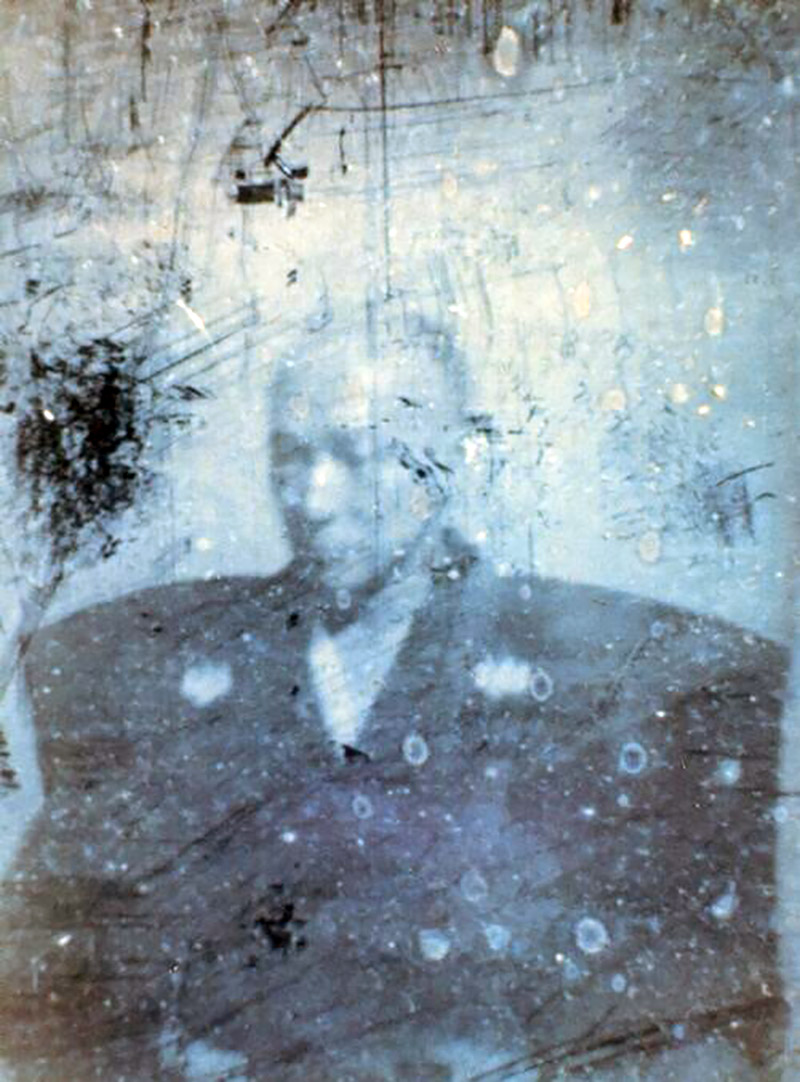
Ichiki's daguerreotype of Shimazu Nariakira, the earliest surviving Japanese photograph

In 1848 (Edo era), a camera for daguerreotype was imported by a Dutch ship to Japan (Nagasaki, 長崎). It is said that this was the first camera in Japan. During the Edo era, import and export had been prohibited (sakoku, 鎖国) by the Edo Government (Edobakufu, 江戸幕府), except that only Dutch ships were permitted to export and import various goods at Nagasaki Port. Hence, the first camera was introduced at Nagasaki. This camera was imported by Ueno Toshinojō (1790–1851, 上野俊之丞) and in 1849 passed to Shimazu Nariakira (1809–1858, 島津斉彬), who later would become a feudal lord (daimyō, 大名) of the Satsuma Domain (薩摩藩, now Kagoshima-ken).

In Satsuma Domain, detailed study with respect to photography had been done, but it took almost ten years from the acquisition of the first camera to taking the first photograph. In 1857, Shimazu Nariakira's photograph was taken by Ichiki Shirō (1828–1903, 市来四郎) and Ujuku Hikoemon (宇宿彦右衛門) (daguerréotype). This is said to be the first photograph taken by a Japanese person that still exists and can be seen at the Shōko Shūseikan (尚古集成館, Kagoshima-city, Japan).

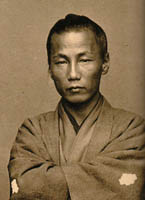
Self-portrait of Ueno Hikoma, c. 1870s

In 1854, the Convention of Kanagawa (日米和親条約, Nichi-Bei Washin Jōyaku, "America-Japan Treaty of Amity and Friendship") was concluded between the U.S. and Japan. The Anglo-Japanese Friendship Treaty (日英和親条約, Nichi-Ei Washin Jōyaku) was concluded between Britain and Japan, and the Treaty of Shimoda (日露和親条約, Nichi-Ro Washin Jōyaku) was concluded between Russia and Japan. The treaties opened the Japanese ports of Shimoda (in Shizuoka Prefecture), Hakodate (in Hokkaido Prefecture) and Nagasaki to trade. In 1858, the Treaty of Amity and Commerce (United States – Japan) (日米修好通商条約) was concluded between the U.S. and Japan and opened the port of Kanagawa. But soon the port of Yokohama (横浜), which is close to Kanagawa, opened for trade with foreign countries in exchange for the port of Kanagawa. The trade based on these treaties began in 1858 at Yokohama, Nagasaki and Hakodate. This is opening is called Kaikoku (開国, to open the nation for foreign countries and trades) in the Japanese language. Thanks to Kaikoku, more and more cameras and other photography-related equipment and materials were imported to Japan. Furthermore, some foreign photographers, such as Felix Beato came to Japan and took many photographs of Japan.

In 1862, Ueno Hikoma (1838–1904, 上野彦馬) opened his photo studio in Nagasaki and in the same year Shimooka Renjo (1823–1914, 下岡蓮杖) opened his own photo studio in Noge (野毛, soon later included within Yokohama). The opening of these two portrait studios indicated a new era in Japanese photography.

=== Professional photographers in the Meiji era ===
After the opening of the Ueno Studio and the Shimooka Studio, around the turning point between the Edo era and Meiji era (1868), several new photo studios were opened, such as that of Kuichi Uchida (1844–1875, 内田九一) in 1865 in Osaka and moved in 1866 to Yokohama; that of Yohei Hori (or HORI Masumi, 1826–1880, 堀与兵衛 (堀真澄)) in 1865 in Kyoto, that of Kōkichi Kizu (1830–1895, 木津幸吉) in 1866 in Hakodate, that of Rihei Tomishige (1837–1922, 冨重利平) in Yanagawa, and that of Yokoyama Matsusaburō (1838–1884, 横山松三郎) in Chikugo in 1866.

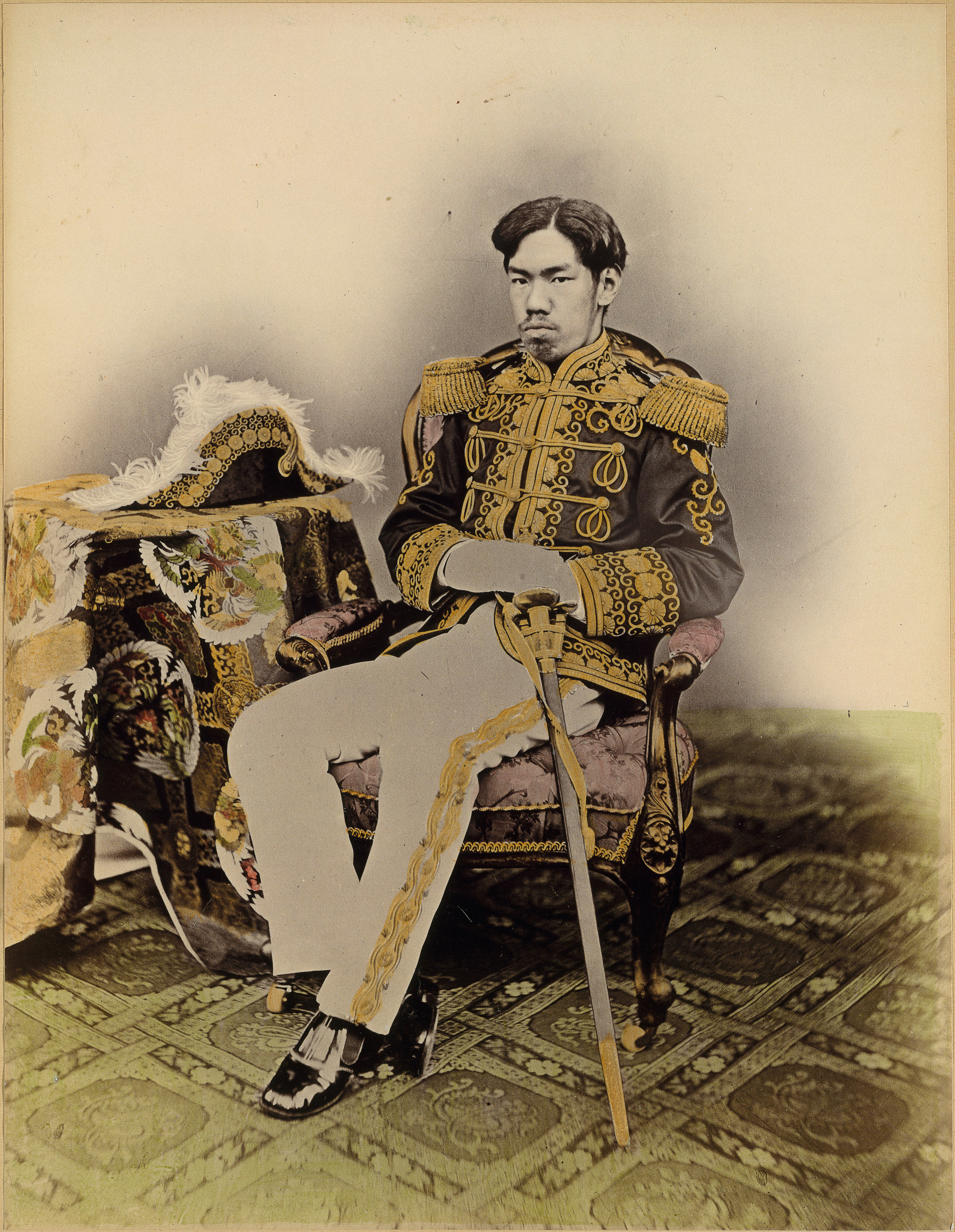
Portrait of the Meiji Emperor (御真影) by Uchida Kuichi, 1873. Albumen silver print

Among these photographers (Shashin-shi, 写真師), Uchida Kuichi is most famous for his photographs of the Meiji Emperor (明治天皇) in 1872 and 1873, which photographs have been called Goshin'ei (御真影) and were used as public portraits of the Meiji Emperor. "真(shin)" means "true" and "影(ei)" means "(photographic) image" or "portrait" and "御(go)" means the honorific prefix for "真影". In the Meiji era, only very few persons, such as prime ministers, could meet the Meiji Emperor in person and most Japanese people at that time had no chance to see him. But the Meiji Emperor's image was necessary for him to govern Japan and Japanese nations. Therefore, the Meiji Government prepared "御真影" and used "御真影" for the Emperor's governance and for the Meiji Government's governance.

Among other photographers, Kakoku Shima (1827–1870島霞谷) and Ryū Shima (1823–1899, 島隆) should be mentioned. They were a husband and a wife and began taking pictures together around 1863 or 1864. Ryū Shima was called the first woman professional photographer.

Further, between the 1860s and 1900, the genre of "Yokohama-shashin" (Yokohama Photo, Photographs selling or distributing in Yokohama, 横浜写真) was very popular. Yokohama-shashin showed Japanese scenery, Japanese people (especially Japanese women) and Japanese culture. These images were very widely used as souvenirs, especially among foreigners. Among photographers for Yokohama-shashin, Felix Beato and Kusakabe Kimbei (1841–1934, 日下部金兵衛) were very famous.

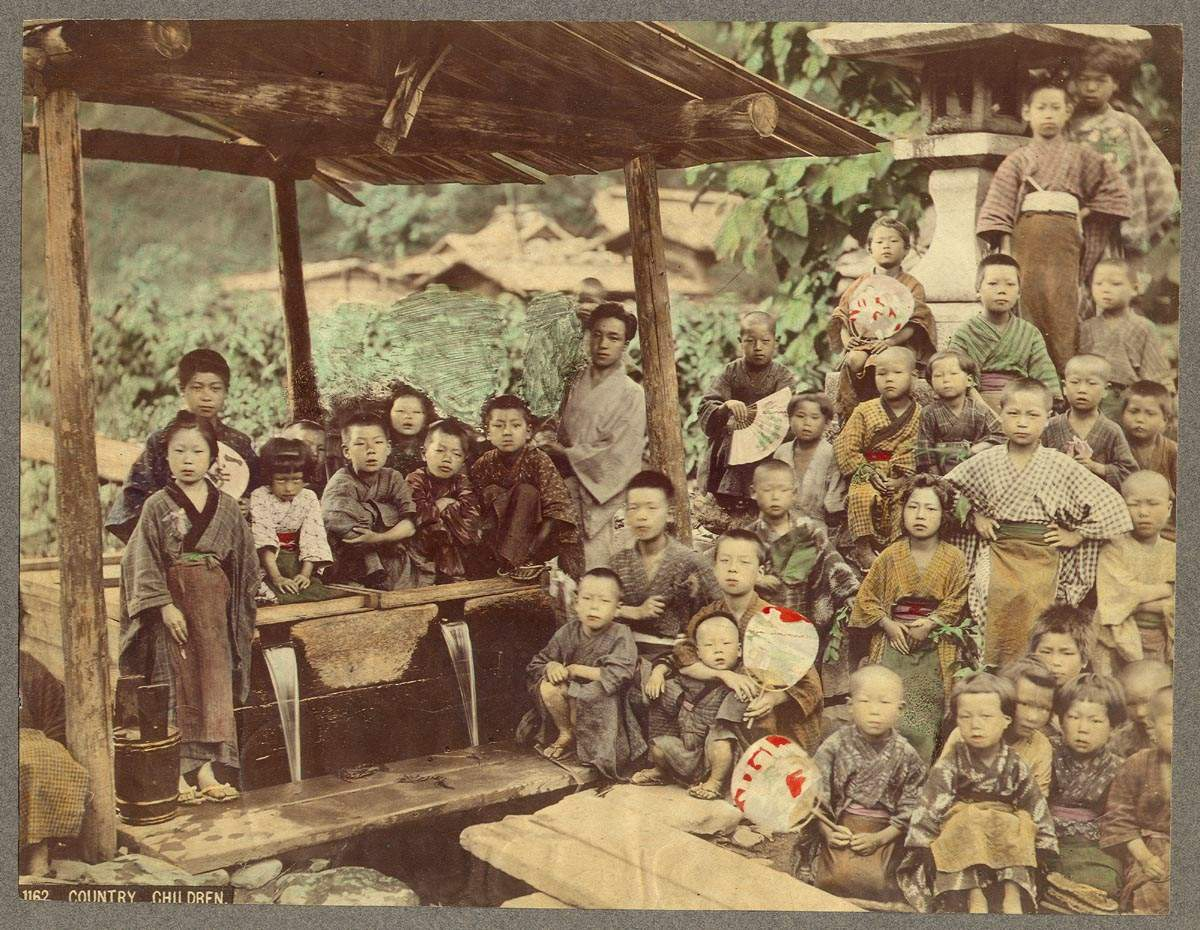
Country Children. Hand-coloured albumen silver print, by Kusakabe Kimbei

Because of Kaikoku, many foreign people came to Japan. Further, after the Meiji Ishin (Meiji Government establishment in 1868), many Japanese were able to travel within Japan without breaking laws and thus began domestic leisure and business travel. Yokohama was an attractive meeting place for foreigners and for Japanese, and Yokohama-shashin attracted such travellers very much.

Two main characteristics of Yokohama-shashin were:

1. well-decorated album-style photographs, and
2. hand-colored photographs

But towards the end of the 19th century, picture postcards, which were much cheaper than Yokohama-shashin, became very popular and were widely used in Japan. And many amateur photographers were emerging who liked to take their own pictures rather than to buy expensive Yokohama-shashin. These were the major reasons for Yokohama-shashin to decline.

In the 1880s, photographers in a new generation began their creating new kinds of pictures. Reiji Esaki (1845–1910, 江崎礼二), who took photographs of an experimental torpedo explosion in the Sumida River in 1883, and Kazuma Ogawa (1860–1929, 小川一眞), who not only took photographs but also was the manager of a printing factory, were particularly famous in this generation.

In the 1860s and 1870s, many photographs of Hokkaidō were taken. These were called Hokkaidō Kaitaku Shashin (Photographs of Land Development in Hokkaidō, 北海道開拓写真). Hokkaidō in those years was being developed by the Japanese Government. The Government in Tokyo needed detailed reports of the development in writing, and they thought reports with photographs should be better and the Government requested some photographers to take photographs of the progress in Hokkaidō. Such photographers included Tamoto Kenzō (1832–1912, 田本研造), Kōkichi Ida (1846–1911, 井田侾吉), Raimund von Stillfried-Ratenicz (1839–1911), Seiichi Takebayashi (1842–1908, 武林盛一) and Sakuma Hanzō (1844–1897, 佐久間範造).

=== Emerging amateur photographers ===
Around the middle of the 1880s, photographers (写真師) began to use gelatin dry plates very widely. Before this, the wet collodion process (湿式コロジオン法) was the standard process in Japan. But it was technically difficult and also was expensive. That is why few amateur photographers can be seen before the invention of gelatin dry plates.

Two famous examples early amateur photographers in Japan are:

- Kamei Koreaki (1861–1896, 亀井茲明), who was a count and studied aesthetics in England and Germany, took photographs of the Sino-Japanese War (日清戦争) in 1895.
- Kajima Seibei (1866–1924, 鹿島清兵衛) took many photographs in the 1890s, such as a life-size portrait of Manzaburō Umewaka (NO (能) actor) and a big-size photograph of Mt. Fuji.

The widespread availability of gelatin dry plates and small-sized cameras led to the era of prominent amateur photographers in the 20th century in Japan.

=== Other major photographers ===
- HASEGAWA Kichijirō (fl. 1870s, 長谷川吉次郎) who is included in "The History of Japanese Photography" (see "Further reading" below)

== 20th century ==
=== Era of Geijutsushashin (Era of Pictorialism) ===
- In 1904, Yūtsuzu-sha (ゆふつヾ社) was founded by Tetsusuke Akiyama, Seiichi Katō and other photographers.
- In 1904, Naniwa Photography Club (Naniwa Shashin Club, 浪華写真倶楽部) was founded in Osaka.
- In 1907, Tokyo Photographic Research Society (Tokyo Shashin Kenkyūkai, 東京写真研究会) was founded in Tokyo.
- In 1912, Aiyū Photography Club (Aiyū Shashin Club, 愛友写真倶楽部) was founded in Nagoya; members included Chotaro Hidaka (1883–1926, 日高長太郎), Aitarō Masuko (1882–1968, 益子愛太郎), Matsutaro Ohashi (1891–1941, 大橋松太郎), and the photographic materials merchant Gorō Yamamoto—whose shop (Yamamoto Gorō Shoten) also served as the club’s secretariat. See Photography in Nagoya for an overview of Nagoya's photographic culture and movements.
- In 1912, Yonin Kai was founded by Yasuzō Nojima (1889–1964, 野島康三) and other three photographers.
- In 1921, Shashin Geijutsu Sha (写真芸術社) was founded and the first issue of Shashin Geijutsu (Photographic Art, 写真芸術) was published by Shinzō Fukuhara (1883–1948, 福原信三), Rosō Fukuhara (1892–1946, 福原路草) and other photographers.
- In 1922, Japan Photographic Art Association (Nihon Kōga Geijutsu Kyōkai, 日本光画芸術協会) was founded by Hakuyō Fuchikami (1889–1960, 淵上白陽) and the first issue of Hakuyō (白陽) was published.
- In 1922, the first issue of Geijutsu Shashin Kenkyū (Art Photography Studies, 芸術写真研究) was published.
- In 1922, a photographic monograph Paris et la Seine, Paris and the Seine (Pari to Seinu, 巴里とセイヌ) and in 1923, another monograph, Light and its Euphony (Hikari to sone Kaichō, 光と其諧調) were published by Shinzō Fukuhara.
- In the early 1920s, ves-tan school (ベス単派) was formed by Masataka Takayama (1895–1981, 高山正隆), Makihiko Yamamoto (1893–1985, 山本牧彦) and Jun Watanabe.
- In 1925, the Tokyo Photographic Research Society, the Naniwa Photography Club, and the Aiyū Photography Club held a joint shooting excursion in the Shizuoka area; a later history of the Chūkyō photography world described them as Japan's "three major clubs".

=== Era of Shinkōshashin (Era of New Photography) ===
The term shinkō shashin ("New Photography") is often used in later histories as an umbrella label for interwar photographic modernism in Japan, including both "straight" approaches and more experimental procedures. Within and alongside this milieu, late-1930s debates sometimes used the label zen'ei shashin ("avant-garde photography"), a term whose public meanings were shaped by political sensitivity and wartime constraints; see Avant-garde photography in Japan for an overview and context beyond a single organization or city.

- In the early and mid-1920s, there appeared some photographic tendencies called constructivism school (構成派) within Nihon Kōga Geijutsu Kyōkai members, for example, in Hakuyō Fuchikami's works.
- In 1923, the first issue of Asahi Graph (The Asahigraph Weekly, アサヒグラフ) was published.
- In 1923, there occurred Kantō Great Earthquake (Kantō Daishinsai, 関東大震災).
- In 1924, the first issue of Photo Times (フォトタイムス) was published.
- In 1926, the first issue of Asahi Camera (アサヒカメラ) was published.
- In 1927, Iwata Nakayama returned to Japan after several years in the U.S. and Europe,
- In 1930, Tampei Photography Club (Tampei Shashin Club) (February 1930-c. 1941, Osaka) (丹平写真倶楽部) was founded by Bizan Ueda and other photographers and later Nakaji Yasui (1903–1942, 安井仲治) entered this Club.
- In 1930, Ashiya Camera Club (芦屋カメラクラブ) was founded by Iwata Nakayama (1895–1949, 中山岩太), Kambei Hanaya (1903–1991, ハナヤ勘兵衛) and other photographers.
- In 1930, New Photography Research Society (Shinko Shashin Kenkyūkai, 新興写真研究会) was founded and the first issue of Shinko Shashin Kenkyū (New Photography Studies, 新興写真研究) was published by Sen'ichi Kimura.
- 1931: German International Traveling Photography Exhibition (独逸国際移動写真展, Doitsu Kokusai Idō Shashin Ten; This was a traveling exhibition of "Film und Foto" in Stuttgart, Germany in 1929) was held in Tokyo [April] and Osaka [July].
- In 1931, photographers in Nagoya formed the Dokuritsu Shashin Kenkyūkai and began issuing the pamphlet-format bulletin Dokuritsu (『独立』; A.1–B.2, Nov 1931–Apr 1932).
- In 1932, the first issue of Kōga (Photography, 光画) was published by Yasuzō Nojima, Iwata Nakayama and Ihee Kimura (or Ihei Kimura).
- In 1932, Manchuria Photographic Artists Association (Manshū Shashin Sakka Kyōkai) (満洲写真作家協会) was founded and in 1933, Manshū Graph (Pictorial Manchuria, 満洲グラフ) was published by Hakuyō Fuchikami.
- In 1932, a photographic monograph, Camera, Eye x Iron, Construction (Camera, Me x Tetsu Kōsei, カメラ・眼×鉄・構成) was published by Masao Horino (1907–1999, 堀野正雄).
- In 1933, a photographic monograph, Early Summer Nerves (Shoka Shinkei, 初夏神経) was published by Kiyoshi Koishi (1908–1957, 小石清).
- In 1936, a photographic monograph, the Reason for Sleep (Nemuri no Riyū, 眠りの理由) was published by Ei-Q.
- In 1937, the touring exhibition Kaigai Chōgenjitsushugi Sakuhin Ten (Exhibition of Surrealist Works from Overseas) opened in Tokyo and then toured to Kyoto, Osaka, Nagoya, and Kanazawa; scholarship notes that the exhibition relied heavily on photographic reproductions and other printed materials. (see Surrealism in Japan)
- In 1937, Avant-Garde Image Group (Avant-Garde Zōei Shūdan, アヴァンギャルド造影集団) was founded by Gingo Hanawa (1894–1957, 花和銀吾), Terushichi Hirai (1900–1970, 平井輝七) and other photographers.
- In 1938, Avant-Garde Photography Association (Zen'ei Shashin Kyōkai, 前衛写真協会) was founded by Shūzo Takiguchi and some photographers.
- In 1938, the poet-photographer Kansuke Yamamoto (1914–1987, 山本悍右) produced the Surrealist photography-and-poetry journal Yoru no Funsui (The Night's Fountain), which featured poems, texts, drawings, and photographs by Yamamoto himself; it ceased with its fourth issue in 1939 following police censorship.
- In 1939, Nagoya Photo Avant-Garde (名古屋フォトアバンガルド) was formed when the photography section of the Nagoya Avant-Garde Club became independent, with the poet and photographer Kansuke Yamamoto (1914–1987, 山本悍右) participating; the group was led by Minoru Sakata (1902–1974, 坂田稔), alongside other photographers.
- In 1939, Société IRF (ソシエテ・イルフ) was founded in Fukuoka by Wataru Takahashi (1900–1944, 高橋渡) and other photographers.
- In 1940, a photographic monograph, Mesemu zoku (メセム属; Mesemb, 20 photographies surréalistes) was published by Yoshio Shimozato.
- In 1940, a photographic monograph, Light ("Hikari", 光) was published by Tampei Shashin Club.
- In 1942, Nakaji Yasui died.

=== Era of Hōdōshashin (Era of Photojournalism) ===
- In 1932, Yōnosuke Natori returned to Japan from Germany as a correspondent photographer of Ullstein-Verlag.
- In 1933, Nippon Kōbō (Japan Studio, 日本工房) was founded by Yōnosuke Natori, but in 1934 most of main members other than Natori has left Nippon Kobo and founded Chūō Kōbō (Metropolitan Studio, 中央工房). Then Natori reorganized Nippon Kōbō.
- In 1934, the first issue of Nippon was published by Nippon Kōbō.
- In 1938, the first issue of Shashin Shūhō (Photo Weekly, 写真週報) was published.
- In 1941, Tōhōsha (Far East Company, 東方社) was founded.
- In 1942, the first issue of Front was published by Tōhōsha.

After WWII, there appeared the era of Hōdōshashin (era of photojournalism) again, mainly led by Ken Domon (1909–1990, 土門拳), Ihee Kimura (Ihei Kimura, 1901–1974, 木村伊兵衛) and Yōnosuke Natori (1910–1962, 名取洋之助), all of three were very active even during WWII. During the war, photographers including Kansuke Yamamoto, Keiichirō Gotō, Kōrō Honjō, Terushichi Hirai and Hitori Yoshizaki curtailed the public presentation of their avant-garde photography. They continued avant-garde photographic work after the war.

=== Postwar avant-garde and experimental photography ===
The Nagoya-based collective VIVI was formed in 1947 by Minayoshi Takada, Kansuke Yamamoto, Yoshifumi Hattori and Keiichirō Gotō. Jō Takeba describes their regrouping after the war as a revival of the avant-garde photographic activity in which they had been involved, to differing degrees, during the late 1930s. In January 1949, the cross-disciplinary art association Bijutsu Bunka Kyōkai established a photography section that included photographers connected with prewar avant-garde circles.

The Japan Subjective Photography League was formed in 1956 as subjective photography gained attention in Japan. The First International Subjective Photography Exhibition that year included photographers from different generations, among them Yamamoto, Gotō, Kiyoji Ōtsuji, Ikkō Narahara, Shōji Ueda, Hisae Imai and Yasuhiro Ishimoto. The May 1957 special issue Bessatsu Atorie Atarashii Shashin presented 130 works by twenty-nine photographers, including Yamamoto, Nobuya Abe, Kōrō Honjō and Hitori Yoshizaki from the prewar avant-garde, together with Ōtsuji, Narahara, Imai and Ishimoto from the postwar generation. The Tokyo Photographic Art Museum has noted that photographers involved in the prewar avant-garde continued to pursue free photographic expression after the war and influenced younger photographers including Narahara and Eikoh Hosoe.

In Nihon Shashin-shi: Shashin zasshi 1874–1985 (2024), Ryūichi Kaneko, Masako Toda and Ivan Vartanian write that subjective photography prompted a reappraisal of techniques used in New Photography and prewar avant-garde photography, and that its spread was followed by the technically elaborate and symbolic work of VIVO photographers Narahara, Shōmei Tōmatsu and Kikuji Kawada.

== 21st century ==
In the 21st century, Japanese photography has shifted towards digital innovation and social documentary. The era is marked by the emergence of influential female photographers and the global recognition of contemporary artists such as Rinko Kawauchi and Mika Ninagawa, who explore themes of everyday life and vibrant aesthetics.

== Survey exhibitions and catalogues ==
English-language overviews of Japanese photography have been shaped by a small number of museum-scale survey projects and their catalogues. A landmark example is the traveling exhibition and catalogue The History of Japanese Photography (organized by the Museum of Fine Arts, Houston in collaboration with the Japan Foundation in 2003), described by CAA Reviews as "the first nuanced, thorough history of Japanese photography in a Western language". The publication provides historical and cultural context across the medium's development, including interwar modernism and avant-garde experimentation.
