= Dokuritsu Shashin Kenkyūkai =

Japanese photography group formed in Nagoya in 1931

- 独立寫眞研究會
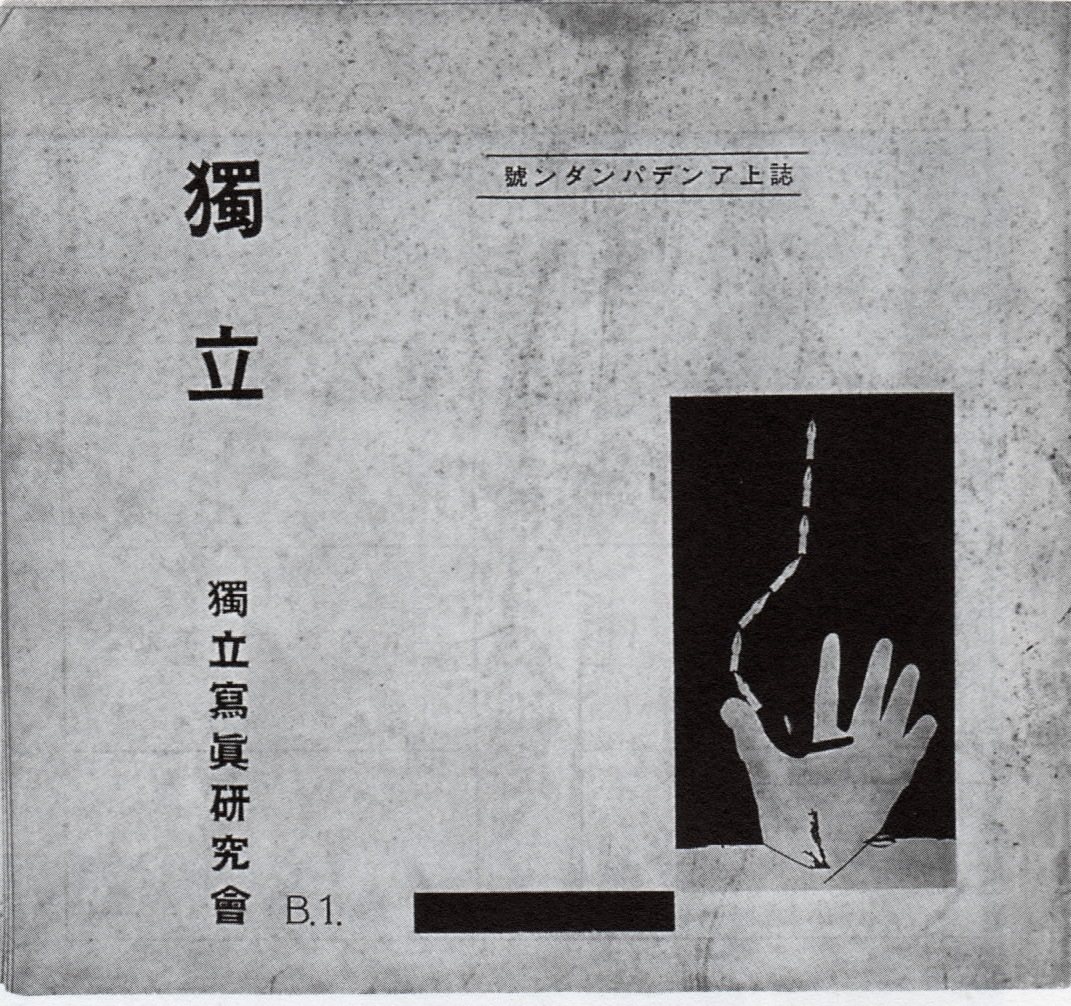
- Dokuritsu B.1 (January 1932)
- Formation: 1931
- Founded at: Nagoya, Japan
- Type: Photography group
- Main organ: Dokuritsu

Dokuritsu Shashin Kenkyūkai (独立寫眞研究會; modern orthography: 独立写真研究会) was a photography group formed in Nagoya, Japan, in 1931. The name has also been rendered in English as "Independent Photography Research Association". The group published four issues of a bulletin titled Dokuritsu (独立) between November 1931 and April 1932. Photography historian Ryūichi Kaneko describes the bulletin as a forum where members presented work, exchanged views, and explored new forms of photographic expression. Kaneko argues that Dokuritsu should be reconsidered as a journal at the center of the Shinkō shashin movement in Nagoya.

== Name ==
The group's name appears in contemporary material in the prewar form 独立寫眞研究會. It is generally written today as 独立写真研究会. Eiko Aoki uses the romanized form Dokuritsu Shashin Kenkyūkai and the English translation "Independent Photography Research Association".

== Background and formation ==
The Nagoya City Art Museum identifies self-published journals, newsletters, and photobooks as a distinctive feature of Nagoya's photographic culture, with photographers using publications as well as exhibitions to circulate their work and ideas. The Dokuritsu Shashin Kenkyūkai was formed at a photographic-supplies shop run by Gorō Yamamoto in Sakae, Nagoya. The museum describes the shop as a center of photographic activity in the city. Gorō Yamamoto was also a founding member of the Aiyū Shashin Kurabu.

Jō Takeba dates the formation of the Dokuritsu Shashin Kenkyūkai to October 1931 and writes that it was established by Kentarō Shimizu, Hachirō Tomita, and Mitsuya Okonogi. Takeba records sixteen members at the time of its formation. They included Masaya Kaifu, Shōjirō Mikuni, and the seventeen-year-old Kansuke Yamamoto, who was then using the name 山本勘助.

Published accounts differ somewhat in their description of the founding membership. Yamamoto's chronology in the 2001 Tokyo Station Gallery catalogue identifies him as a founding member and also names Okonogi, Kaifu, and Mikuni as members of the group. Kaneko describes Okonogi as a central figure in the group and names Shimizu and Tomita among its members.

Kaifu and Mikuni were also associated with the Aiyū Shashin Kurabu. Kaneko describes the Dokuritsu Shashin Kenkyūkai as bringing together a younger generation of photographers who were dissatisfied with established pictorial photography and sought new forms of photographic expression.

== Dokuritsu ==
The first issue of Dokuritsu, A.1, was published on 5 November 1931. The Nagoya City Art Museum records four issues in all, from A.1 in November 1931 to B.2 in April 1932. Each issue was an eight-page printed booklet made from two folded sheets. The publication was not sold commercially. The copies listed by the museum are recorded as privately held.

The inaugural issue included Kentarō Shimizu's essay "独立写真研究会・断想". Shimizu called for a break with the imitation of painting and argued that photography should develop from an understanding of the medium's own properties. He also stressed the freedom of individual photographers in making their work.

Another statement in A.1 described the formation of the group as an affirmation of freedom in creative work and a rejection of restraint by collective organizations. The statement also emphasized the individual character of each photographer's work.

The bulletin combined critical writing with reproductions of members' photographs. Kaneko describes it as a place for members to present work, exchange opinions, and pursue new photographic expression. Takeba notes that the second issue contained a list of new members, providing evidence of the group's membership at the time.

== Works and criticism ==
Yamamoto contributed "題と主題（一）" (Dai to shudai, part one) to B.1 in January 1932. The issue also reproduced two works from his early "或る人間の思想の発展" series. One of these, "或る人間の思想の発展―2. 日暮れ前1時間やがて出発である", appeared on the cover of B.1.

B.2, published on 5 April 1932, included Yamamoto's "題と主題（二）" (Dai to shudai, part two). The same issue reproduced his collage Development of a Man's Thought…Mist and Bed Room (或る人間の思想の発展…靄と寝室と). The Nagoya City Art Museum dates the work to 1932 and records it as a gelatin silver print with collage on paper. In its account of this period, the museum describes Yamamoto's photocollages as highly accomplished and sharply critical.

Takeba describes Yamamoto's collages from the series as combining images of performers and buildings with other photographic and printed elements, including newspaper reports on disarmament negotiations. He argues that these combinations go beyond the presentation of fragments of reality by prompting the viewer to imagine time and narrative.

Takeba discusses Yamamoto's "題と主題" in connection with debates surrounding Shinkō shashin in the early 1930s. He reads the essay as a critique of tendencies emerging within Shinkō shashin itself, arguing that Yamamoto objected to a photograph's title becoming primary or absolute in relation to the work. Takeba further interprets the essay as a warning about a problem that would soon become visible in works published in Kōga.

Takeba notes that Dokuritsu appeared after Shinkō Shashin Kenkyū ceased publication in July 1931 and before the launch of Kōga in May 1932.

== Connections with Shinkō shashin ==
Members of the Dokuritsu Shashin Kenkyūkai also participated in the Tokyo-based Shinkō Shashin Kenkyūkai. Kaneko lists Kaifu and Mikuni among the Shinkō Shashin Kenkyūkai's dōjin and records both as members of the Aiyū Shashin Kurabu and the Dokuritsu Shashin Kenkyūkai. The Tokyo Photographic Art Museum likewise notes that the Shinkō Shashin Kenkyūkai included photographers from the Dokuritsu Shashin Kenkyūkai in Nagoya as well as members of the Naniwa Photography Club in the Kansai region.

Kaneko compares Shimizu's statement in the first issue of Dokuritsu with the 1931 declaration of the Ashiya Camera Club and Ihei Ina's 1932 essay "写真に帰れ" ("Return to Photography"). He considers Shimizu's statement comparable in substance to these better-known texts associated with the emergence of modern photography in Japan. Kaneko argues that Dokuritsu occupied a central place in the development of Shinkō shashin in Nagoya. He further argues that Nagoya constituted another center of Japanese New Photography alongside Tokyo and the Kansai region.

== Later study and exhibition ==
Kaneko noted in 2001 that many details about the Dokuritsu Shashin Kenkyūkai remained unclear. The Nagoya City Art Museum later included all four issues of Dokuritsu in its survey of the Nagoya photography movement from 1911 to 1972. The museum placed the bulletin in the section devoted to the rise and experimentation of Shinkō shashin in Nagoya. Takeba likewise discusses the group and its bulletin in his account of the emergence of New Photography in the city.

Material from Dokuritsu was reproduced in the 2001 volume Surrealist Photography and Criticism in the series Collection of Japanese Surrealism. The volume also included material from later avant-garde publications associated with Yamamoto, including Yoru no Funsui, VOU, and CARNET BLEU.

== Members ==
Published sources name the following photographers among the group's founders or members.

- Mitsuya Okonogi (小此木光也) — described by Kaneko as a central figure in the group.
- Kentarō Shimizu (志水賢太郎) — named by Takeba among those who established the group.
- Hachirō Tomita (富多八郎) — named by Takeba among those who established the group.
- Kansuke Yamamoto (山本勘助, later 山本悍右) — recorded in his chronology as a founding member.
- Masaya Kaifu (海部誠也) — recorded by Takeba as a member at the time of the group's formation.
- Shōjirō Mikuni (三國庄次郎) — recorded by Takeba as a member at the time of the group's formation.

== See also ==
- Shinkō shashin
- Photography in Japan
- Kansuke Yamamoto (artist)
- Aiyu Photography Club
- Ashiya Camera Club
- Kōga (magazine)
- Surrealism in Nagoya
