= Exhibition catalogue =

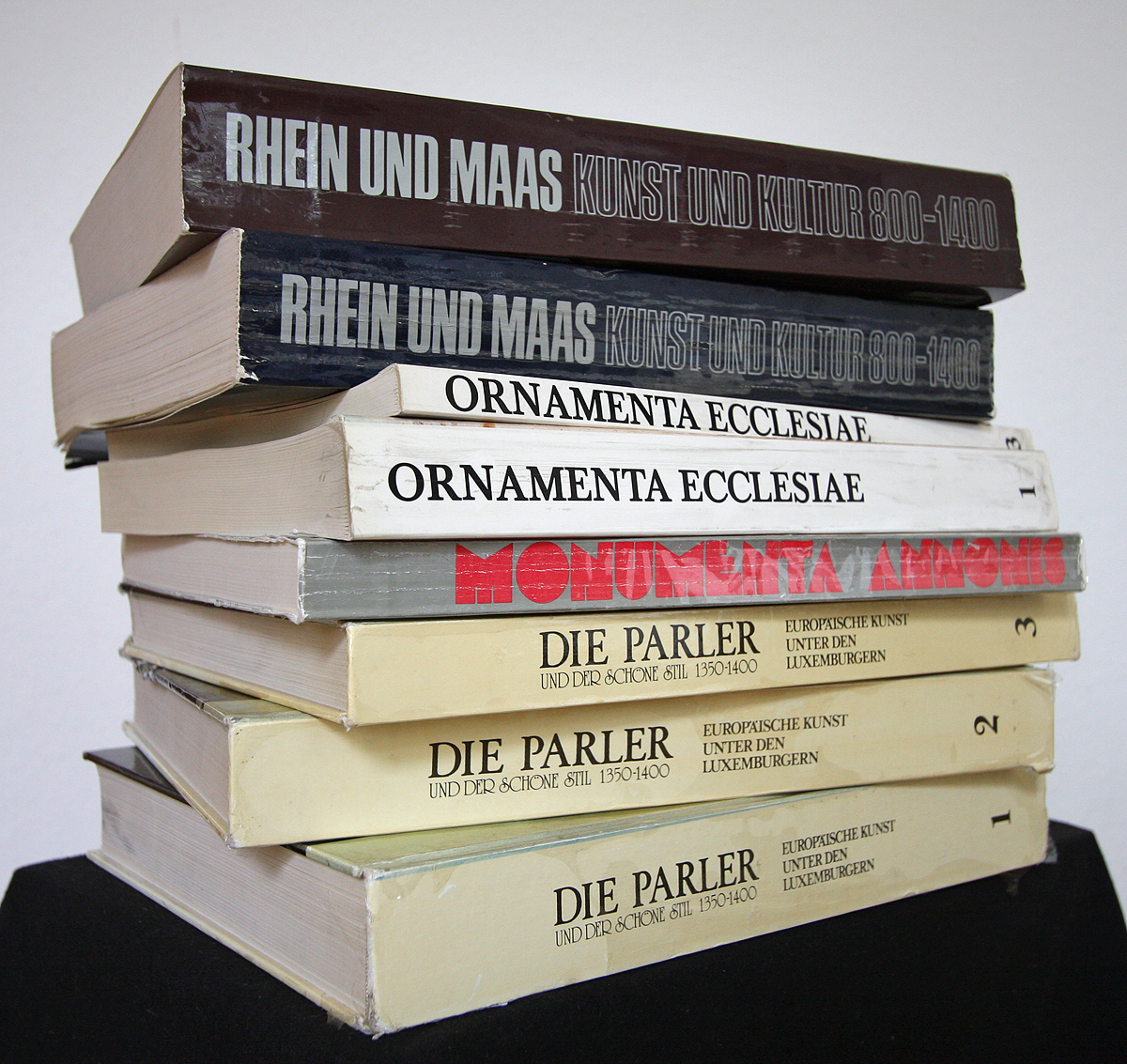
Exhibition catalogues of Museum Schnütgen, Cologne

Exhibition catalogues (or exhibition catalogs), which come in a variety of mediums, including print and digital publication, are documents made for displaying, promoting, detailing, and archiving the content of exhibitions. Publication style may depend on factors such as the amount of information needing detail, budget, intentions of the exhibition project teams and stakeholders, and the audiences they are hoping to reach. Regardless of publication style, these catalogues contain information such as the tombstones , images, and descriptions of the objects exhibited, and thematic essays often written by curators, other subject matter specialists, or leadership responsible for organizing the exhibition display.

Exhibition catalogues can be published for exhibitions that may occur in a single gallery, span a wing of an institution, or tour globally. They can act as a resource for further in-depth reading on curatorial research efforts and discoveries that could not be accommodated within the physical exhibition display; as fundraising and development for an institution or project; as historic record, memorial, or cultural time capsule.

Alternatively, an exhibition catalogue can be a directory of exhibitors at a trade fair or business-to-business event.

== Art or museum exhibition catalogues ==
Catalogues for art or museum exhibitions may range in scale from a single printed sheet to a hardcover "coffee table book". The advent of cheap colour-printing in the 1960s transformed what had usually been simple "handlists" with several works to each page into large scale "descriptive catalogues" that are intended as both contributions to scholarship and books likely to appeal to many general readers. Providing a catalogue for an exhibition allows for more detail to be shared beyond the in-gallery wall text of a permanent collection display. Some critics argue that exhibition catalogues display a notably increased level of information from their historically taxonomic origins, especially when the subject matter is facilitated through an institution or organizing body with a substantial budget.

=== Format of art catalogues ===
Book-sized exhibition catalogues too in the West typically have a colour photograph of every item on display, and also of other relevant works not in the exhibition (these usually smaller and often in black and white). There will be a short formal catalogue description of each item, and usually interpretative text often amounting to one or more pages. The resulting book will have at least one introductory essay, often several, footnotes, bibliography and other critical apparatus. It is usually only in the language of the location, although if the exhibition is travelling internationally, local translated editions will be produced for each location. The book may be published by the institution that hosts the exhibition (or one of these institutions), but is distributed by and often co-published with a larger publisher. It will not dwell on the fact that it is the catalogue of a particular exhibition, and often will not contain a plan of the exhibition. Visitors to the exhibition will anyway know this, and the intention - often successful - is to create a book which has a permanent usefulness. Nearly all are produced in paperback; a hardback edition is a sign of serious intentions. Most major catalogues are sold in at least some bookshops, and are available for order more widely through the booktrade. Many receive specific sponsorship to finance them, and usually a number of authors contribute.

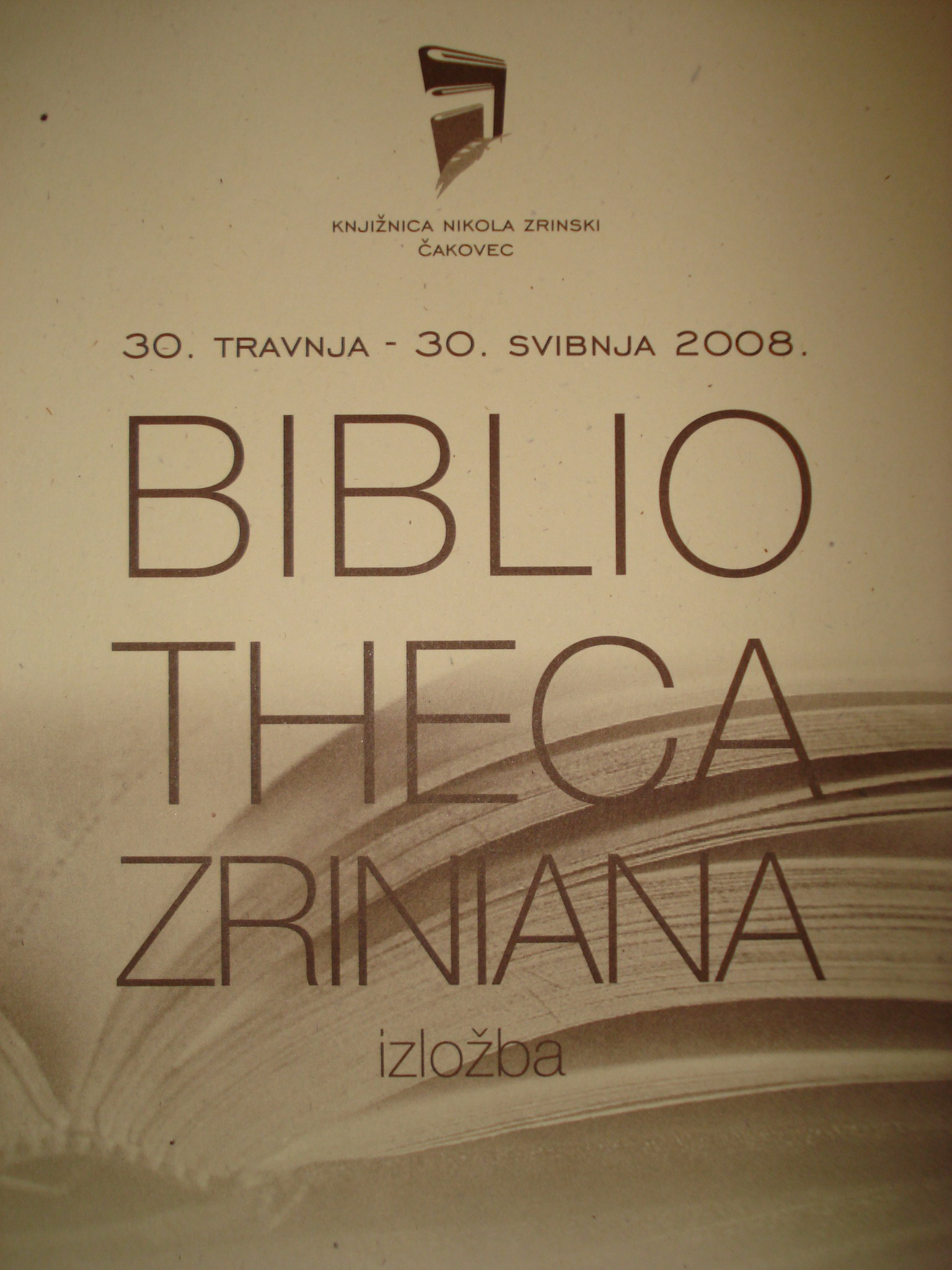
Front cover of the 2008 Čakovec exhibition catalogue of Bibliotheca Zriniana library from 1662, owned by Nikola Zrinski, Ban (Viceroy) of Croatia

In recent decades, exhibition catalogues have grown to prodigious sizes and may be the most comprehensive sources for even rather large subject areas. Probably the largest to be produced were in the 1970s in a competitive spree by Italian provinces and German lander to promote the significance of their region by mounting huge exhibitions on the period when its cultural production was at its peak. A typical example is the three-volume Die Parler und der schöne Stil 1350-1400. Europäische Kunst unter den Luxemburgern from Cologne of 1978, with a further two volumes published in 1980 on a colloquium held in conjunction with the exhibition. The three volumes covering the exhibition proper amount to over a thousand pages and it would have been unfeasible to have taken them into the exhibition itself. Another example is The History of Japanese Photography, 432 pages long and with over four hundred plates.

This trend was led in Britain by the Royal Academy of Arts and in the USA by the Metropolitan Museum of Art in New York and the National Gallery of Art in Washington.

=== Japanese catalogues ===
Japanese exhibition catalogues often provide captions, a certain amount of text, or both in a second language (usually English), and occasionally also a smaller amount in a third language. This is not always so: the large catalogue (over 360 pages) for a major exhibition of the wood-block artist Yasunori Taninaka is in Japanese alone. Meanwhile, Works by 25 Photographers in their 20s is completely bilingual, Japanese and English.

The great majority of Japanese exhibition catalogues are only available directly from the galleries or museums that host or hosted the exhibitions. These catalogues are acquired and shelved by libraries together with other books and are available on the used book market, but lack ISBNs. However, exceptions do exist: the catalogue of an exhibition of the photographs of Nakaji Yasui was produced via an independent publisher and distributed as a regular book.

== Catalogues for trade fairs ==
Exhibition catalogues are used at commercial exhibitions and trade fairs to profile all the exhibitors at the event. They serve not only as a guide for visitors on the day, but also as an industry directory used afterwards by visitors (and others) to find suppliers and business partners.

Many exhibition catalogues are used by market researchers because they contain good quality information about companies that are active in a particular market place.

A typical exhibition catalogue contains the following:

- Introduction and welcome message from the event organiser
- Floor plan showing the location of each exhibition stand
- Summary alphabetical list of exhibitors
- Exhibitor profiles (normally a textual description of each exhibitor plus their contact details)
- A ‘buyer’s guide’ where exhibitors are listed under relevant product or service categories
- Details of seminars or conference sessions running alongside the exhibition
- Advertisements promoting the exhibitors

The format of exhibition catalogues for trade fairs can range from A5-sized ‘saddle-stitched’ publications with descriptions of as few as 30-40 exhibitors, to much larger perfect-bound ‘stretched A5’ or A4-sized directories containing profiles on thousands of companies exhibiting at major international trade events such as The London Book Fair, SIAL (the Paris-based food exhibition), and Nuremberg International Toy Fair (Spielwarenmesse).

The exhibition organiser is ultimately responsible for publishing the catalogue for their own event. However, many organisers outsource the design, production and advertising sales for these publications to specialist exhibition catalogue contract publishers operating within the exhibitions industry.

Other common terms to describe the exhibition catalogue at a trade fair include 'event guide', 'show guide', 'show catalogue', 'exhibition directory', 'fair guide' or 'exhibition guide'. Often exhibition organisers will add the word 'official' to the front of the name of the publication (e.g. 'Official exhibition catalogue') to distinguish their publication from unofficial exhibition catalogues for their event produced by trade magazine publishers.

== Bibliography ==
- The History of Japanese Photography, ed. Anne Wilkes Tucker, et al. New Haven: Yale University Press, 2003. ISBN 0-300-09925-8. Exhibition held at the Museum of Fine Arts (Houston) and the Cleveland Museum of Art, 2003.
- Nakaji Yasui: Photographer 1903–1942 / Yasui Nakaji shashinshū (安井仲治写真集). Tokyo: Kyodo News, 2004. ISBN 4-7641-0542-X. Exhibition held at the Nagoya City Art Museum and Shoto Museum of Art (Shibuya), 2004–5. Text in both Japanese and English.
- Die Parler und der schöne Stil 1350-1400. Europäische Kunst unter den Luxemburgern, ed. Anton Legner. 3 + 2 vols. Cologne: Schnütgen-Museum, 1978 & 1980.
- Taninaka Yasunori no yume: Shinema to kafe to kaiki no maboroshi (谷中安規の夢:シネマとカフェと怪奇のまぼろし, The dreams of Yasunori Taninaka: Apparitions of the cinema, cafes and mysteries). Published by the exhibitors, 2003. Exhibition held at the Shoto Museum of Art, Suzaka Hanga Museum (Suzaka) and Utsunomiya Museum of Art (Utsunomiya), 2003–2004. Text in Japanese only.
- Works by 25 Photographers in their 20s / 25nin no 20dai no shashin (25人の20代の写真). Published by the exhibitor, 1995. Exhibition held at Kiyosato Museum of Photographic Arts (Kiyosato), 1995. Text in Japanese and English.
