= Masuko =

Masuko (written: 益子) is both a Japanese surname and a feminine Japanese given name. Notable people with the name include:

- Aitarō Masuko (益子 愛太郎, 1882–1968), Japanese photographer
- Osamu Masuko (益子 修, 1949–2020), Japanese business executive
- Yoshihiro Masuko (益子 義浩, born 1987), Japanese footballer
- Masuko Ushioda (潮田 益子, 1942–2013), Japanese violinist
