= George Krause =

American photographer

George Krause (born 1937) is an American artist photographer, now retired from the University of Houston where he established the photography department. Krause has published a few books of photographs and his work has been collected by many institutions. He lives and works in Wimberley, Texas.

== Early life and education ==
Krause was born in 1937 in Philadelphia, Pennsylvania. During the 1950s, he studied painting, drawing, sculpture, and photography at the Philadelphia College of Art (PCA; now a part of the University of the Arts).

== Life and work ==
While serving in the US Army between 1957 and 1959, he turned his full attention to photography, spending all his free time documenting the culture of the black neighborhoods in the racially segregated communities of South Carolina. Krause later moved in a less documentary direction, seeking images that were more ambiguous and open to viewer interpretation with projects dealing with cemetery monuments, religious statuary, and an atypical series of nudes.

In the volume George Krause: a Retrospective published in 1991 in conjunction with a major mid-career exhibition, Anne Wilkes Tucker, the curator of photography at the Museum of Fine Arts, Houston, observed:

"Krause explores intensely personal themes rooted in basic human concerns: sensuality, mortality, and mystery....His work is perpetually relevant because his issues are basic and vital to the human condition. Few viewers leave his exhibitions unmoved—be it by indignation, horror, pathos, or wonder."

Krause lives and works in Wimberley, Texas.

== Publications ==
- George Krause 1. Haverford, Pennsylvania: Toll Armstrong Publishers, 1972. Book, introduction by Mark Power.
- I Nudi. Philadelphia: Mancini Gallery, 1980.
- Qui Riposa: Alternative Lives. New Haven, Connecticut, 1987. Booklet of photographs by Krause and texts by Rosellen Brown.
- Krause Roman. Houston, Texas: Harris Gallery, 1991. Leaflet, afterword by Mark Power.
- George Krause: Universal Issues. Houston, TX: Rice University Press, 1991. Book, introduction by Anne Wilkes Tucker.
- George Krause: a Retrospective. Houston, TX: Rice University Press, 1991. ISBN 978-0892633098. Edited by Anne Wilkes Tucker.

== Grants ==
- Fulbright-Hays Fellowship to Spain in 1963
- Commission from Citizens’ Council on City Planning and the Philadelphia Foundation in 1966
- Guggenheim Fellowship in 1967
- Philadelphia College of Art Alumni Award in 1970
- National Endowment for the Arts in 1973
- Bicentennial Commission, Philadelphia in 1975
- First Prix de Rome in Photography Guggenheim Fellowship in 1976-77
- Photographer in Residence, American Academy in Rome National Endowment for the Arts in 1979-80
- Unicolor Grant in 1983
- National Endowment for the Arts, Filmmaking in 1985
- Cultural Arts Council of Houston in 1986
- Texas Artist of the Year in 1993
- Tylee Cottage Residency, Whanganui, New Zealand in 1997
- Artist in Residence at Milwaukee Institute of Art and Design, Milwaukee, Wisconsin in 2007

== Collections ==
Krause's work is held in the following permanent collections:

- Museum of Modern Art, New York City: 2 prints (as of 7 June 2024)
- Philadelphia Museum of Art: 26 prints (as of 7 June 2024)
- Museum of Fine Arts, Houston: 74 prints (as of 7 June 2024)
- Carpenter Center for the Visual Arts, Harvard University: 30 prints (as of 7 June 2024)
- Art Institute of Chicago: 2 prints (as of 7 June 2024)
- Sarjeant Gallery, Whanganui, New Zealand: 40 prints (as of 8 June 2026)
