= Takebayashi =

Takebayashi (written: 竹林 or 武林) is a Japanese surname. Notable people with the surname include:

- Takebayashi Seiichi (武林 盛一, 1842–1908), Japanese photographer
- Takaji Takebayashi (竹林 隆二, 1909–?), Japanese swimmer
- Takebayashi Takashige (武林 隆重, 1672–1703), Japanese samurai

== Fictional characters ==
- Kōtarō Takebayashi (竹林 孝太郎), a character in the manga series Assassination Classroom
- Ryoma Takebayashi, the main character of the light novel series By the Grace of the Gods
