= Jō Takeba =

Japanese curator and historian of photography

- 竹葉 丈
- Born: 1961 (age 64–65)
- Occupations: Curator; historian of photography
- Employer: Nagoya City Art Museum
- Awards: Scholarly Award of the Photographic Society of Japan (2018)

Jō Takeba (竹葉 丈; born 1961) is a Japanese curator and historian of photography at the Nagoya City Art Museum. His exhibitions and publications have dealt with modern photography in Nagoya and with the history of photography in Manchuria. He was one of the editors of The History of Japanese Photography (2003). He received the Scholarly Award of the Photographic Society of Japan in 2018. His publications and exhibitions have been reviewed in CAA Reviews, Eizōgaku, Ronza, artscape and Bijutsu Techo.

== Career and work ==
At the Nagoya City Art Museum, Takeba's earlier projects included exhibitions on Nagoya's photo avant-garde in 1989, Hakuyō Fuchikami and the Manchurian Photographic Artists Association in 1994, and Shōmei Tōmatsu in 2011.

In 2003, Takeba joined Anne Wilkes Tucker, Dana Friis-Hansen and Ryūichi Kaneko as an editor of The History of Japanese Photography, the catalogue for an exhibition shown at the Museum of Fine Arts, Houston and the Cleveland Museum of Art. He wrote the chapter "The Age of Modernism: From Visualization to Socialization", covering New Photography and avant-garde photography from 1924 to 1945 and their social context. Mikiko Hirayama's review in CAA Reviews called the catalogue the most comprehensive reference book on Japanese photography then available in English. Morihiro Satow, writing in Eizōgaku, described the volume as a definitive survey of Japanese photographic history at the time and discussed Takeba's chapter in detail.

In 2017, Takeba returned to the subject of photography in Manchuria with the exhibition The Development of Japanese Modern Photography in MANCHOUKUO at the Nagoya City Art Museum. He edited and wrote the accompanying book, Ikyo no modanizumu: Manshū shashin zenshi (異郷のモダニズム 満洲写真全史), which covered documentary photography, pictorialism, official publicity, illustrated magazines and wartime propaganda in Manchuria. The book was reviewed in Ronza, where Akira Nogami examined its account of the changing relationship between photography, publicity and propaganda in Manchuria.

The Photographic Society of Japan awarded Takeba its 2018 Scholarly Award for his continuing research on art photography and New Photography in Nagoya and for the 2017 Manchuria exhibition. The award citation said that the exhibition had opened up a little-known area of Manchurian photographic history and credited Takeba's work with contributing to the development of Japanese photographic history. CAPA Camera Web also reported his receipt of the award. The exhibition and book received a special award at the 30th Shashin no Kai Awards in the same year.

In 2021, Takeba organized Shashin no miyako monogatari: Nagoya shashin undōshi 1911–1972 (「写真の都」物語 名古屋写真運動史1911–1972), tracing six decades of photographic groups and movements in Nagoya. The exhibition followed Takeba's stated approach of looking at photographs through groups of people and shared movements rather than treating the history as a succession of individual photographers. Reviewing the exhibition in artscape, Kōtarō Iizawa placed it in a series of Takeba's earlier projects on the Aiyū Photography Club and Minoru Sakata, on avant-garde photographers including Kansuke Yamamoto, and on Shōmei Tōmatsu, and called the 2021 exhibition the culmination of that work.

The Fukuoka Art Museum invited Takeba to lecture on avant-garde photography and Minoru Sakata in 2021. In its account of the lecture, the museum described him as a specialist in modern and contemporary photographic history who had organized numerous exhibitions and as a leading scholar of Sakata.

== Selected publications ==
- Tucker, Anne Wilkes; Friis-Hansen, Dana; Kaneko, Ryūichi; Takeba, Jō, eds. (2003). The History of Japanese Photography. New Haven: Yale University Press in association with the Museum of Fine Arts, Houston. ISBN 978-0-300-09925-6.
- Takeba, Jō (2017). Ikyo no modanizumu: Manshū shashin zenshi 異郷のモダニズム 満洲写真全史. Tokyo: Kokusho Kankōkai. ISBN 978-4-336-06157-7.
- Takeba, Jō (2021). Shashin no miyako monogatari: Nagoya shashin undōshi 1911–1972 「写真の都」物語 名古屋写真運動史1911–1972. Tokyo: Kokusho Kankōkai. ISBN 978-4-336-07198-9.
