= Chotaro Hidaka =

Japanese photographer (1883-1926)

- 日高 長太郎
- Born: 1883; Higashiura, Aichi Prefecture, Japan
- Died: April 3, 1926 (aged 42–43)
- Known for: Photography
- Movement: Pictorialism

Chotaro Hidaka (Japanese: 日高 長太郎, Hepburn: Hidaka Chotaro; 1883 – 3 April 1926) was a Japanese photographer associated with Pictorialism. Based in Nagoya, he was a co-founder of the Aiyu Photography Club and one of the central figures in art photography in the Taisho era. He is best known for gum-bichromate landscape photographs, especially mountain scenes. Later exhibitions and scholarship have placed Hidaka and the Aiyu club at the beginning of modern photographic culture in Nagoya.

== Life and career ==
Hidaka was born in Higashiura, Aichi Prefecture. In 1912, he co-founded the Aiyu Photography Club in Nagoya with Sano Shiei and Goro Yamamoto. The club later published the portfolio series Gashu between 1916 and 1921, and its third volume was issued by Goro Yamamoto. Later writing on Nagoya photography treats the club as one of the foundations of the city's photographic culture.

In 1914, his photograph Shako received a commendation at the Tokyo Taisho Exposition. Hidaka was also active in the exhibitions of the Tokyo Photography Research Society (Tokyo Shashin Kenkyukai); from 1922 until his death he served as a juror for its annual Ken-ten exhibition. He died on 3 April 1926. In July of that year, the Aiyu Photography Club published the memorial volume Hidaka Chotaro Isakushu.

== Work ==
According to Morihiro Sato, all of Hidaka's photographs formally exhibited or published as works were landscapes. He concentrated especially on mountain and rural scenery, and later commentary has described him as a major figure in the mountain landscape branch of Japanese pictorial photography. His photographs are closely associated with the gum bichromate process, and museum commentary has emphasized both his control of that medium and his movement from descriptive landscape toward compositions organized around light and shadow.

Works reproduced in later museum surveys include Asa no ogawa (1912), Takahara no fuyu (1917), Ame no yu (1918), Kisoji no haru (1920), Kage (1921), Matsu no kodachi (1925), and Takao fukei (1926).

== Reception and legacy ==
Nagoya City Art Museum devoted a 1990 exhibition to Hidaka and the Aiyu Photography Club. In 2021, the same museum's exhibition The Movement of Modern Photography in Nagoya 1911-1972 opened with a section titled "The beginnings of photographic art: Hidaka Chotaro and the Aiyu Photography Club", underlining his place at the start of the city's photographic history. Reviews and exhibition texts for that show described the achievements of Hidaka and the Aiyu club as foundational to Nagoya's later reputation as a "city of photography".

Hidaka also figures in the longer genealogy of Nagoya photography. One of the Aiyu club's founders, Goro Yamamoto, later became the father of the Surrealist photographer Kansuke Yamamoto. In the 2021 Nagoya City Art Museum survey, works by Goro Yamamoto were placed immediately after the Hidaka and Aiyu section, presenting Hidaka's milieu as part of the prehistory of the city's later avant-garde photography.
