= Yoarashi Okinu =

Japanese geisha

- 夜嵐 おきぬ
- Born: Harada Kinu (原田 きぬ) c. 1845; Awa Province, Edo, or Jōgashima, Miura Peninsula, Japan
- Died: March 28, 1872 (aged 27); Japan
- Other names: Kamakura Koharu, Hanayo, Shingetsu-in
- Occupations: Geisha, poisoner
- Years active: Late Edo period - early Meiji period
- Known for: Poisoning Kobayashi Kinpei, and her sensationalized story.
- Children: 1 (with Arashi Rikaku)
- Status: Executed by decapitation
- Motive: Passion, jealousy, and possibly financial gain.
- Conviction: Murder
- Criminal charges: Murder
- Penalty: Death
- Capture status: Arrested

Details
- Victims: Kobayashi Kinpei
- Date: March 2, 1871
- Country: Japan
- Killed: 1
- Weapon: Poison

Yoarashi Okinu (夜嵐 おきぬ, c. 1845 – March 28, 1872) is the moniker of Harada Kinu (原田 きぬ), who was a Japanese female poisoner and geisha and lived from the end of the Edo era to the beginning of the Meiji era. Her nickname Yoarashi means night-storm in Japanese.

== Biography ==
Her early life is generally undocumented and has produced many ideas and opinion. Some sources assert that she was a daughter of a samurai of Awa Province, or she was born in Edo. There is another opinion that she was a daughter of Sajiro, a fisherman who lived on the island of Jōgashima at the tip of the Miura Peninsula. According to a non-fiction writer Atsushi Hachisu, she sold herself into geisha because her family was poor, and she worked as a geisha. There is another opinion that she was an employee at the decorative collar shop in the Nakamise neighborhood in front of Sensō-ji.

As she was beautiful, people in the Edo longed for her. She became a mistress of Ōkubo Tadayori (大久保忠順) in the capital Edo. He was the daimyō of the Karasuyama Domain in Shimotsuke Province, which was rated at thirty thousand koku. Ōkubo had a son, the successor to the Ōkubo family, by her. However, he hated her, and abandoned her in the Meiji Restoration.

She became a mistress of Kobayashi Kinpei, but she paid for sex with kabuki actor Arashi Rikaku, and then fell in love with him, so she killed Kobayashi with poison on March 2, 1871. Rikaku harbored her but they were arrested. She was sentenced to death, and she was executed by decapitation after she had a child by Rikaku.

Rikaku was sentenced to 3 years in prison, and he was released in September 1874. He became kabuki actor Ichikawa Gonjūrō after his release.

== Fictional story ==
Her case was reported sensationally several years after that, but many researchers such as a Japanese art historian Naoyuki Kinoshita agree that mass media adapted her and there were untruths in her tradition. In 1878, she was called a serial killer. A book Night-storm Okinu: Flower-Frail Dreams of Revenge (夜嵐阿衣花廼仇夢, Yoarashi Okinu Hana-no-adayume) characterized her as a she-devil, and her tradition is based on this virtual fiction.

=== Real life differences ===
- She lost her parents when she was 16 years old, and then she was accepted into her uncle's family as a foster child, living in Edo. There she became a geisha in the restaurant Owari-ya. She gave out as Kamakura Koharu.
- She met not Okubo Tadayori, but Okubo "Sado-no-Kami (defender in Sado)" (his name was unwritten).
- She had a son Haruwaka-gimi, in "1857" (At that time, she was about "12 years old". It was Okubo Tadayori's birth year).
- In those days the woman of low social class couldn't marry a nobleman. Fictional story claimed that Kurosawa Gentatsu, a physician who lived in Nihonbashi, became her foster parent, the middle-class family. She changed her name to Hanayo and became a concubine (In fact she was a mistress).
- When her son was three years old, her husband died (Okubo Tadayori died in 1914. His father died in 1864).
- After his death she changed her name to Shingetsu-in. She became a Buddhist nun, and lived a calm life to pray for her dead husband followed the Japanese custom which is that a widow of high status entered nunhood after her husband died. She felt run-down in this life and went to Hakone. She fell in love with another man Kakutarō. She was exiled from the Okubo family (In fact, the Okubo family abandoned her, because Okubo Tadayori had a son by her).
- A part of her dying word was "Yoarashi" so she was called Yoarashi Okinu (unproved claim).
