= Gorō Yamamoto =

Japanese photographic materials merchant and photographer (1880–1941)

- 山本 五郎
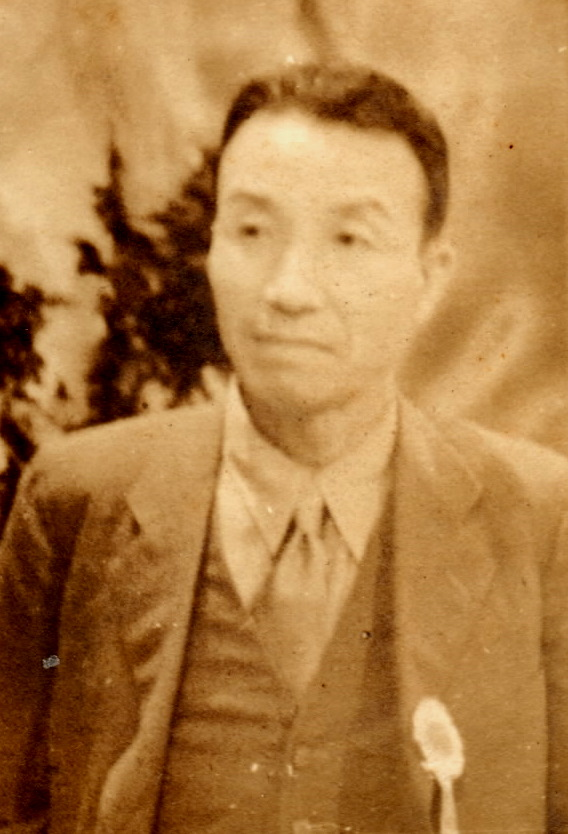
- Portrait of Yamamoto
- Born: 12 February 1880
- Died: 12 April 1941 (aged 61)
- Occupations: Photographic materials merchant; photographer
- Known for: Proprietor of Yamamoto Gorō Shoten; founding member and later representative of Aiyū Shashin Kurabu (Aiyū Photo Club)
- Children: Kansuke Yamamoto

Gorō Yamamoto (山本 五郎 (Yamamoto Gorō), 1880–1941) was a Japanese photographic-materials merchant and amateur photographer active in Nagoya. He ran Yamamoto Gorō Shoten (a photographic materials store) and was a founding member—and later representative—of Aiyū Shashin Kurabu (Aiyū Photo Club), an early pictorialist-oriented amateur photography circle whose regular meetings were tied to his shop and whose exhibition albums (Aiyū gashū) were issued under his name. He was the father of the avant-garde photographer-poet Kansuke Yamamoto.

== Early life and background ==
Published details on Yamamoto's early life are scarce. By the early 1910s he was active in Nagoya as the owner of a photographic equipment shop (shashinki-ten), at a time when pictorialism (kaiga shugi)—known in Japan as "art photography" (geijutsu shashin)—was widely practiced among amateur photographers.

In January 1912, Yamamoto joined a photo excursion to Tajimi (Kokeizan) followed by an organizing meeting that formally established Aiyū Shashin Kurabu (愛友写真倶楽部; Aiyū Photo Club). The founding meeting was attended by figures including Chōtarō Hidaka, Shiei Sano, Yamamoto, and others, and the club subsequently held monthly meetings at venues such as Sano's home, Nakano Hanjirō's photo studio, and Yamamoto's shop. In 1920, Yamamoto was credited as the publisher of the third volume of the club's exhibition album series, Aiyū gashū (愛友画集).

Later biographical chronologies describe Yamamoto as an early photographic equipment merchant in Nagoya and note that he served as a founding member of Aiyū Shashin Kurabu and acted as the club's representative during the Taishō period. He was the father of the avant-garde photographer and poet Kansuke Yamamoto (1914–1987).

== Yamamoto Gorō Shoten (camera shop and studio) ==
In March 1905, Yamamoto is reported to have opened Yamamoto Gorō Shoten (山本五郎商店) on Hirokōji in central Nagoya, operating both a photographic-equipment shop and a photo studio.

Museum publications on early photographic circles in Nagoya describe the shop as more than a retail business: it functioned as a practical "base" for local amateur-photography networks and club activity. A Nagoya City Art Museum newsletter notes that the secretariat of Aiyū Shashin Kurabu (愛友写真倶楽部; Aiyū Photo Club) was placed at Yamamoto's shop on Hirokōji. A club history likewise records that regular meetings were held at venues including Yamamoto's shop, underscoring its role as a recurring gathering place for photographers in the city.

In accounts of Nagoya's modern art and photography scene, Yamamoto's Sakae-machi photographic-equipment-and-materials shop is also characterized as a local hub for photography, associated with the formation of groups active in the early 1930s. The shop is discussed in this context not as an "artist's studio" in the narrow sense, but as an infrastructure node—linking equipment and materials, meeting space, and the social networks through which photographic practice circulated in early 20th-century Nagoya.

== Aiyū Shashin Kurabu (Aiyū Photo Club) ==
Aiyū Shashin Kurabu (愛友写真倶楽部; Aiyū Photo Club) was a Nagoya-based amateur photography circle associated with Japan's early 20th-century "art photography" (芸術写真) milieu, in which pictorialist techniques such as gum bichromate and bromoil printing were widely practiced. Museum literature notes that in Nagoya the club was formed in 1912 by figures including Chōtarō Hidaka and Shiei Sano, and that it presented high-quality prints and helped lead Japanese photographic art during the period.

A club chronology records that in autumn 1911 Hidaka and Sano began planning the establishment of a new photography club in the city, and that a preparatory photo outing was held on 3 November 1911. In January 1912, following a photo excursion to Tajimi (Kokeizan), the organizers held a meeting that set the club's name as Aiyū Shashin Kurabu and established it as a functioning association. The same chronology lists Yamamoto Gorō among those present at this founding meeting (alongside Hidaka, Sano, Hanjirō Nakano, and others).

After its establishment, the club held monthly meetings and organized seasonal photo outings, and its regular meeting venues included Sano's home, Nakano's photo studio, and Yamamoto's camera shop (Yamamoto Gorō Shoten). In 1920, Yamamoto was credited as the publisher of Aiyū gashū (愛友画集) volume 3, part of the club's exhibition-album series.

A later biographical chronology of his son, the avant-garde photographer and poet Kansuke Yamamoto (1914–1987), also describes Gorō Yamamoto as a founding member of Aiyū Shashin Kurabu and notes that he served as the club's representative during the Taishō period.

== Photography and works ==
Published documentation of Yamamoto's own photographic output is limited, but museum and catalogue materials show that his photographs survive and have been reproduced in modern scholarship on Nagoya's early photography culture. A table of contents for Takeba Jō's 「写真の都」物語 : 名古屋写真運動史 1911-1972 (2021) explicitly includes a subsection titled "山本五郎 初期写真" ("Gorō Yamamoto: early photographs"), indicating that his work is treated in an exhibition/catalogue context rather than being known only through biographical mention.

The 2020年度年報（令和2年度） of the Nagoya City Art Museum includes an exhibited-works list that credits Yamamoto with multiple photographs dated to 1919–1920, presented as inkjet prints produced in 2020 from original negatives (オリジナル・ネガからのインクジェット・プリント).

=== Selected works (as documented in museum materials) ===
- In the vicinity of Hakone (箱根附近), 1919 (printed 2020 from the original negative).
- In the vicinity of Odawara (小田原附近), 1919 (printed 2020 from the original negative).
- In the vicinity of Shibu Onsen (渋温泉附近), 1920 (printed 2020 from the original negative).
- In the vicinity of Yudanaka (湯田中附近), 1920 (printed 2020 from the original negative).
- In the vicinity of Akakura (赤倉附近), 1920 (printed 2020 from the original negative).
- In the vicinity of Naoetsu (直江津附近), 1920 (printed 2020 from the original negative).
- In the vicinity of Izu (伊豆附近), 1920 (printed 2020 from the original negative).
- Untitled (Girl) (題不詳（少女之図）), 1920 (printed 2020 from the original negative).

=== Works in the collection of the Nagoya City Art Museum ===
An illustrated works list in Takeba Jō's exhibition catalogue identifies several early photographs by Yamamoto held by the Nagoya City Art Museum as new prints made in 2020 from original glass-plate negatives:

- Shibu Onsen (渋温泉), 1920 / 2020 (two works).
- Izu (伊豆), 1920 / 2020.
- Odawara (小田原), 1918 / 2020.
- Shuzenji (修善寺), 1920 / 2020.

== Relationship to Kansuke Yamamoto ==
Yamamoto was the father of the avant-garde photographer and poet Kansuke Yamamoto (1914–1987).

Writing on Kansuke's early milieu in Nagoya, Eiko Aoki notes that Gorō owned a photo-supply shop and studio and was among the founding members of Aiyū Shashin Kurabu (Aiyū Photography Club), an amateur group that advocated pictorialism. She adds that Kansuke "grew up surrounded by photography," while later expressing dissatisfaction with the club's pictorialist work.

Later biographical chronologies likewise describe Gorō as an early photographic-equipment merchant in Nagoya and state that he served as a founding member—and Taishō-period representative—of Aiyū Shashin Kurabu.

== Legacy ==
Yamamoto is remembered primarily as a facilitator of Nagoya's early pictorialist ("art photography") circles. A Nagoya City Art Museum publication notes that the secretariat of 愛友写真倶楽部 (Aiyū Shashin Kurabu; Aiyū Photo Club) was located at Yamamoto's shop on Hirokōji in Nagoya, providing an essential local base for the club's network and activities. His family and business background is also referenced in accounts of the early life of his son, the avant-garde photographer and poet Kansuke Yamamoto (1914–1987).

=== Chronology ===
- May 1945 — Yamamoto Gorō Shoten was destroyed by wartime damage.

== Exhibitions ==
Yamamoto's photographs have been exhibited in museum contexts as part of surveys of Nagoya's modern photography history. In 2021, works by Yamamoto (dated 1919–1920) were included in the Nagoya City Art Museum exhibition 「写真の都」物語―名古屋写真運動史：1911-1972― (The Movement of Modern Photography in NAGOYA 1911–1972).

== Publications ==
- 愛友画集 (Aiyū gashū; Aiyū Picture Book), vol. 3 (1920) — published under the name "Gorō Yamamoto" (発行：山本五郎).

== See also ==
- Kansuke Yamamoto
- Aiyū Shashin Kurabu
- Pictorialism
- Photography in Japan
- Photography in Nagoya
