= Naoyuki Kinoshita =

Japanese art historian (born 1954)

Naoyuki Kinoshita (木下 直之, Kinoshita Naoyuki; born 1954) is a Japanese art historian. He currently works in the University of Tokyo. He was born in Hamamatsu, Shizuoka Prefecture and graduated from the Tokyo National University of Fine Arts and Music. He took part in publishing the book The History of Japanese Photography as an essayist along with Kōtarō Iizawa. He is also known for his research of Nishiki-e such as Yoarashi Okinu.

In 2010, Kinoshita praised Kengo Kuma for his decision in which a part of old structures of kabuki-za would remain in the new institution.

== Books ==
- Watashi no Jōkamachi: Tenshukaku kara Mieru Sengo no Nihon (わたしの城下町―天守閣からみえる戦後の日本) (2007, Chikuma Shobō) ISBN 978-4-480-81653-5
