= The Movement of Modern Photography in Nagoya 1911–1972 =

2021 exhibition at Nagoya City Art Museum

The Movement of Modern Photography in Nagoya 1911–1972 was a 2021 exhibition at Nagoya City Art Museum in Nagoya, Japan. The Japanese main title was "Shashin no Miyako" Monogatari (「写真の都」物語, Story of the "City of Photography"), and the subtitle was 名古屋写真運動史:1911-1972. The exhibition surveyed modern photographic culture in Nagoya from the early twentieth century to the early 1970s, tracing it not as a sequence of individual styles but as a history of collective movements shaped by clubs, magazines, exhibitions, and student activity.

== Background and concept ==
The exhibition title was derived from a 1911 statement by the pictorialist photographer Chōtarō Hidaka, who wrote of his wish to make Nagoya a "city of photography". In the catalogue preface, curator Joe Takeba wrote that the aim was not to recount the history of photography in Nagoya as the stylistic evolution of individual makers, but to trace it as a series of expressions produced by people who met, shared goals, and formed common directions. He framed the exhibition and catalogue as an attempt to examine how photography responded to the social and historical demands of each period.

Nagoya City Art Museum described the exhibition as its first attempt to trace roughly a century of modern photographic expression in Nagoya as a continuous series of movements through works and documentary materials.

== Exhibition ==
The exhibition ran from 6 February to 28 March 2021 in the museum's special exhibition galleries. It was organized by Nagoya City Art Museum, Mainichi Shimbun, Nagoya Television, and Yomiuri Shimbun, with support from the Pola Art Foundation and the Mitsubishi UFJ Trust Regional Cultural Foundation. According to the museum's annual report, it brought together more than 500 works and related materials.

The exhibition had originally been scheduled for 12 September to 1 November 2020, but was postponed because of the COVID-19 pandemic and the advancement of renovation work at the museum.

It was arranged in six sections:

1. "The beginnings of art photography: Chōtarō Hidaka and the Aiyu Photography Club"
2. "Phases of the modern city: the rise and experiments of shinkō shashin"
3. "Surrealism or abstraction?: the rise and split of 'avant-garde photography'"
4. "'The crossing of objectivity and subjectivity': postwar realism and subjective photography in tension"
5. "The emergence of Shōmei Tōmatsu"
6. "The Chubu Student Photography Federation: collective and individual, and youth searching around photography"

The museum summarized the show as a continuous trajectory running from the pictorialist activities of Aiyu in the 1920s, through the late-1930s surge of avant-garde photography, to postwar conflicts between realist and subjective approaches, Tōmatsu's emergence, and later student photography movements in the Chubu region.

According to the catalogue preface, the fourth section included work by Kei'ichirō Gotō, Minayoshi Takada, Kansuke Yamamoto, Yoshifumi Hattori, and Kaoru Usui.

== Public programs ==
During the exhibition, Takeba gave three gallery lectures aligned with the show's structure: one on Aiyu Photography Club, one on the transition from avant-garde to subjective photography, and one on Tōmatsu and the Chubu Student Photography Federation.

== Catalogue ==
An accompanying catalogue of the same title was edited and authored by Joe Takeba and published by Kokusho Kankōkai in February 2021. The publisher lists it as a 291-page volume in B5 format. The museum annual report records the catalogue as 290 pages, measuring 26.2 × 19.4 cm.

== Reception ==
Reviewing the exhibition for artscape, Kōtarō Iizawa described it as, in effect, a full-scale survey of Nagoya's movement-history of photography. He called it the culmination of exhibitions previously organized by Joe Takeba on subjects including Aiyu Photography Club, Minoru Sakata, Kansuke Yamamoto and other Nagoya avant-garde photographers, and Shōmei Tōmatsu. Iizawa argued that the exhibition newly revealed the depth and quality of Nagoya's photographic culture, which was often overshadowed by activity in Tokyo, Osaka, and Kobe.

In Bijutsu Techo, Mitsuhiro Wakayama described the exhibition as a summative presentation of sixty years of photographic history in Nagoya and argued that its distinctiveness lay in narrating photographic history as a history of movements rather than as a succession of styles. He also called it an impressive synthesis of the Nagoya City Art Museum's accumulated research since the late 1980s.

Wakayama highlighted the exhibition's treatment of the Nagoya magazine Cameraman and its account of the local reception of shinkō shashin, arguing that the activities of Seiya Kaifu and others functioned as a localizing and dispersive relay for new ideas coming from Tokyo. He further read the fourth section as staging a postwar confrontation between realism and the VIVI circle around Kansuke Yamamoto, whose work he described as trying to construct "subjective reality" on photographic paper in resistance to a single, objectivized view of the real.

== Significance ==
The exhibition's framework positioned Nagoya not as a minor supplement to the better-known histories of Tokyo or Kansai, but as a city with its own clubs, journals, avant-garde circles, postwar disputes, and student movements. In that respect, the exhibition has been treated as a major attempt to consolidate the history of photography in Nagoya into a single, movement-based narrative.

== See also ==
- Photography in Nagoya
- Aiyu Photography Club
- Avant-garde photography in Japan
- Surrealism in Japan
- Nagoya Photo Avant-Garde
- VIVI (photography group)
