= The History of Japanese Photography =

2003 exhibition and catalogue on the history of photography in Japan

- exhibition at the Museum of Fine Arts, Houston (2003)
- 日本写真史展
- Country: United States
- Location: Houston, Texas; Cleveland, Ohio
- Opened: Museum of Fine Arts, Houston (Houston, Texas); March 2 – April 27, 2003
- Closed: Cleveland Museum of Art (Cleveland, Ohio); May 25 – July 27, 2003
- Curator: Anne Wilkes Tucker; Dana Friis-Hansen; Ryūichi Kaneko; Jō Takeba
- Organiser: Museum of Fine Arts, Houston; Japan Foundation

The History of Japanese Photography was a survey exhibition of Japanese photography organized by the Museum of Fine Arts, Houston (MFAH) and the Japan Foundation. It was shown at the MFAH from March 2 to April 27, 2003, and at the Cleveland Museum of Art from May 25 to July 27, 2003. The exhibition was curated by Anne Wilkes Tucker, Dana Friis-Hansen, Ryūichi Kaneko, and Jō Takeba.

An English-language catalogue of the same title was published by Yale University Press in association with the MFAH. In caa.reviews, Mikiko Hirayama described it as the most comprehensive English-language reference work on Japanese photography then available and praised the way it placed Japanese photography in an international context without losing sight of its cultural specificity. Joel Smith, reviewing the same project, acknowledged the catalogue's extensive factual material but criticized its chronological structure and its definition of "Japanese photography".

== Exhibition ==
The exhibition followed a broadly chronological course, from nineteenth-century photography through art photography and 1930s modernism to wartime, postwar, and contemporary work. Reviewing the Houston presentation in the Houston Press, John Devine wrote that formalism dominated the work of the 1930s, including Surrealist compositions, montage, and portraiture.

== Catalogue ==
The accompanying catalogue was edited by Tucker, Friis-Hansen, Kaneko, and Takeba, with editing and translation by John Junkerman. The volume contains Tucker's introduction and six further essays.

- "Introduction" — Anne Wilkes Tucker
- "The early years of Japanese photography" — Naoyuki Kinoshita
- "The origins and development of Japanese art photography" — Ryūichi Kaneko
- "The age of modernism: from visualization to socialization" — Jō Takeba
- "Realism and propaganda: the photographer's eye trained on society" — Ryūichi Kaneko
- "The evolution of postwar photography" — Kōtarō Iizawa
- "Internationalization, individualism, and the institutionalization of photography" — Dana Friis-Hansen

The catalogue also includes a selected bibliography, chronology, photographers' biographies, and a glossary of major photography groups and periodicals.

Hirayama regarded the three essays on early twentieth-century photography as a highlight of the catalogue. She notes that Kaneko's first essay examines the development of Pictorialism in Japan, known as geijutsu shashin (Art Photography), and compares it with European pictorialism. In her discussion of the essay on 1930s New Photography, Hirayama notes differences between photographers working in Kansai and those working in and around Tokyo. She writes that the greater emphasis on narrative among photographers in Kansai later developed into Japanese Surrealist photography. Hirayama also notes that these differences became more politically charged as conditions in Japan grew more tense.

In discussing Kōga, Takeba identifies Yasuzō Nojima, Ihei Kimura, and Iwata Nakayama as the magazine's three founders. Later in the chapter, he cites the Nagoya poet and photographer Kansuke Yamamoto as one critic of the emphasis on objective depiction and notes that Yamamoto remained active as a Surrealist photographer throughout the 1930s.

For the late 1930s, Takeba discusses the Avant-Garde Image Group in Kansai, established by Hanawa Gingo, with Terushichi Hirai and Kōrō Honjō among its founding photographers. He also describes the spread of avant-garde photography beyond Tokyo and Kansai. The Nagoya Photo Avant-Garde was established in February 1939 by Minoru Sakata, Yoshio Shimozato, and others. Wataru Takahashi, Hisashi Hisano, and others formed Société IRF in Fukuoka that October.

== Reception ==
Hirayama argued that the catalogue filled a gap between scholarship on nineteenth-century and contemporary Japanese photography. She also welcomed its combination of documentation-based and theoretical approaches within a comprehensive historical survey. She noted that the breadth of the essays could dilute their main arguments, that some material was repeated between chapters, and that Japanese characters were not provided for photographers' names.

Smith criticized the chronological, multi-author structure for producing a chronicle rather than a coherent history. He also questioned the project's definition of "Japanese photography", noting that it left out work made in Japan by foreign photographers and photography by Japanese Americans in the western United States.

The catalogue was also reviewed in Afterimage by Bruno Chalifour and in The Journal of Japanese Studies by William Johnston.

== See also ==
- Photography in Japan
- Shinkō shashin
- Zen'ei shashin
- Avant-garde photography in Japan
- Surrealist photography in Japan
- Avant-Garde Rising: The Photographic Vanguard in Modern Japan
