= Wataru Takahashi =

Wataru Takahashi (Japanese: 高橋 渡, Takahashi Wataru, 1900–1944) was a Japanese attorney and photographer.

== Early life and career ==
Takahashi was born in Fukuoka Prefecture. After graduating from the Department of Economics at Keio University and the Faculty of Law at Kyushu Imperial University, he practiced as an attorney. He began pursuing photography in his mid-thirties, joining the amateur photography club Fukuoka Shayūkai in 1935 before later becoming a member of the Fukuoka Rollei Club.

== Société IRF and surrealism ==
Takahashi was among the founding members of the surrealist photography group Société IRF, established in Fukuoka in 1939. The group has been described as combining "a distinct regional flavor with the international influence of Surrealism." Its activities were centered around a close exchange of ideas, with members critiquing one another's work, sharing photographic techniques, and discussing literature, craft, and Surrealist poetry. Many members worked across multiple artistic disciplines.

Their works frequently appeared in Photography Club, a sister publication of Camera that catered to amateur photographers with avant-garde inclinations. Members often photographed the same locations and shared prints from common negatives.

Takahashi developed an avant-garde photographic practice rooted in the local character of Hakata, another name for Fukuoka. Ayumi Chu, curator at the Fukuoka Art Museum, notes the influence of Iwata Nakayama in Takahashi's photographs of Fukuoka's urban culture, which employed multiple exposure and long exposure techniques. During the mid-1930s, Fukuoka was rapidly emerging as a commercial center, and the area surrounding Nishi-Ōhashi Bridge became both a hub of Société IRF's activities and a recurring subject in Takahashi's work.

His photographs also incorporated organic forms including seashells, driftwood, and coastal horizons; this reflected Société IRF's broader efforts to adapt European Surrealism to a Japanese context. As Chu observes: "In the process of seeking a profound understanding of Surrealism and further developing it into a form of their own, the members of IRF were also reexamining Japan's history and culture."

== Photography and amateurism ==
As one of Société IRF's oldest members, Takahashi served as an intellectual leader within the group. He contributed a manifesto and published essays in their coterie magazine irf 1.

In October 1938, Takahashi published the essay "Anti-Easy-Going Amateurism" in the nationally circulated photography magazine Asahi Camera. There, he criticized the growing number of casual photography enthusiasts, arguing that the camera had been reduced to "the status of an accessory" and that such attitudes were "hindering the progress of photographic art in its true sense."

For Takahashi, photography demanded seriousness, individuality, and artistic ambition. His own practice reflected these convictions. He employed multiple exposures, overlays of negative and positive images, and intentionally blurred compositions. His subjects frequently included clowns, actors, and other figures removed from everyday experience. In contrast to the rapidly expanding culture of amateur snapshot photography, Takahashi deliberately sought to establish photography as a legitimate artistic medium.

== Wartime transformation ==
The views stated in Takahashi's essay “Anti-Easy-Going Amateurism" make it clear that he regarded photography as a vehicle for individuality, Surrealism, and artistic experimentation. However, as Japan's war in Asia intensified leading up to the Pacific War, Société IRF gradually disintegrated as members relocated, enlisted, or died.

The wartime state increasingly imposed restrictions on artistic expression deemed politically suspect. Like many Japanese artists and intellectuals attempting to preserve a degree of autonomy under military censorship, Takahashi began to redirect his attention toward Japanese culture and ethnographic study. He subsequently produced a photographic report on the remote village of Gokashō in Kumamoto Prefecture and Miyako Island in Okinawa.

Reflecting on this shift later in life, Takahashi wrote: "As far as my photographic activities are concerned, the artistry of photographs has been abandoned. I would happily exchange my life's work for this research." This turn, from avant-garde photography toward the study of Japanese culture, has been interpreted as a form of Tenkō (転向), or ideological conversion, associated with wartime Japan. It also reflects the broader predicament faced by many Japanese modernists of his generation, who struggled to reconcile artistic individuality with the political realities of the late 1930s and early 1940s.

== Death ==
Takahashi died of myocardial infarction in 1944, one year before the end of the Pacific War and the lifting of wartime censorship and the subsequent revival of avant-garde artistic practices in Japan.

== Gallery ==
DUET - 1937

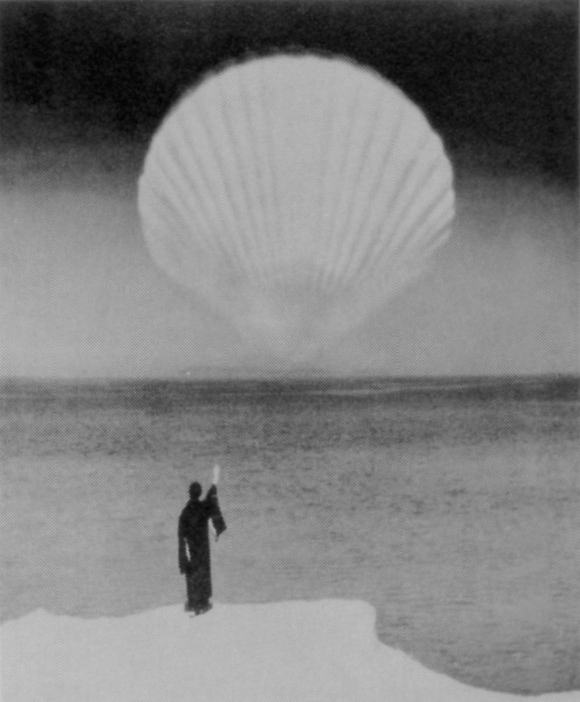
Spirit of the sea - 1938
