= Anne Wilkes Tucker =

American curator of photography

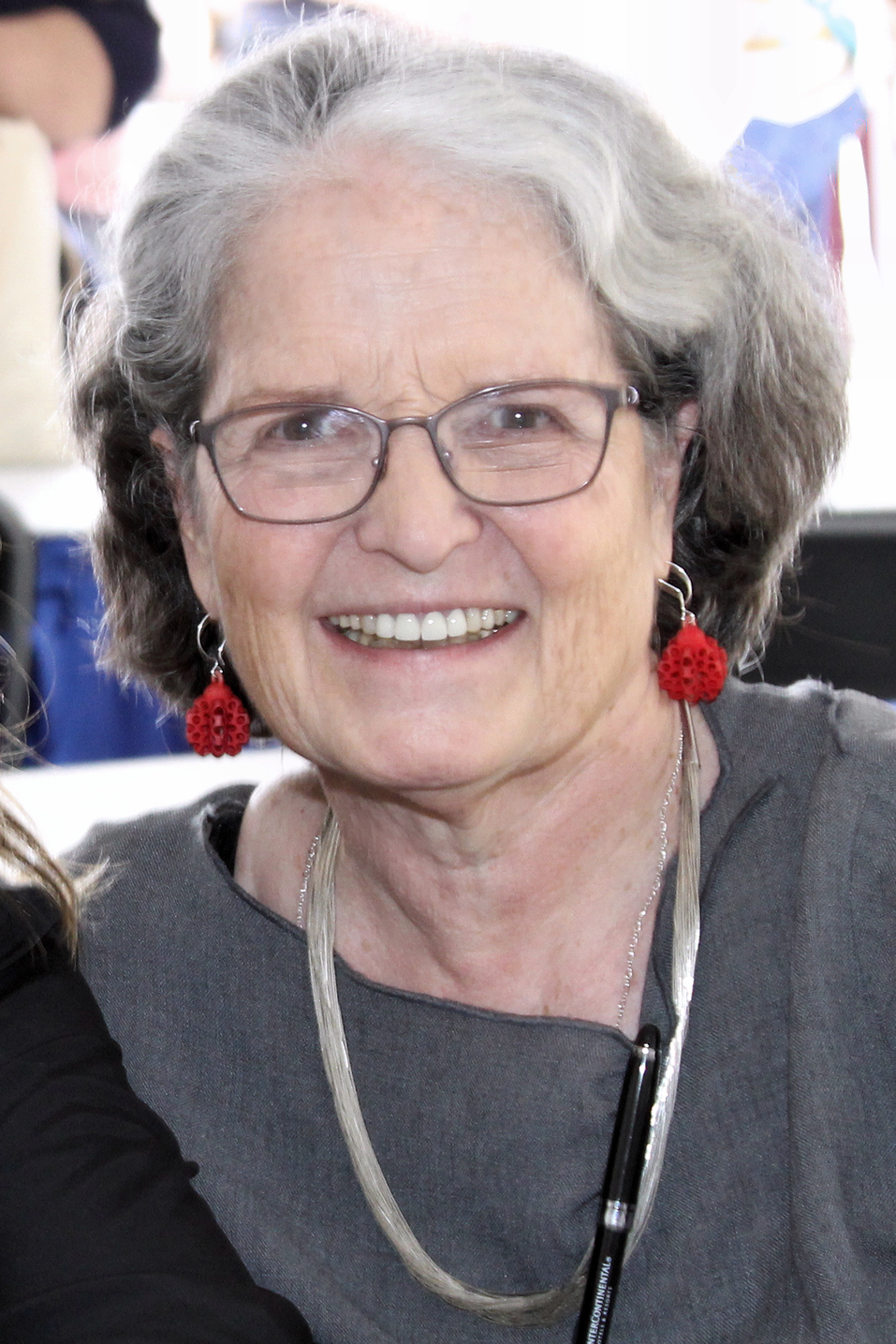
Tucker at the 2017 Texas Book Festival

Anne Wilkes Tucker (born 1945) is a former American curator of photographic works. She retired in June 2015.

== Life and work ==
Tucker was born in Baton Rouge, Louisiana. She received a B.A. in Art History from Randolph Macon Woman's College in Lynchburg, Virginia in 1967, and an A.A.S in photographic illustration from Rochester Institute of Technology in 1968. In 1972, she earned a Master of Fine Arts in Photographic History from the Visual Studies Workshop in Rochester, New York, studying under Nathan Lyons and Beaumont Newhall.

While in graduate school, she worked as a research assistant at the George Eastman House in Rochester; as a research associate at the Gernsheim Collection at the University of Texas, Austin; and as a curatorial intern in the photography department of the Museum of Modern Art, New York with a grant from the New York State Council for the Arts.

Tucker began working for the Museum of Fine Arts, Houston (MFAH) in 1976, when it possessed virtually no photographs. In February of that year, Target Stores made its first donation to MFAH to begin the Target Collection of American Photography. The MFAH Photography department was established in December, when Tucker was hired as a consultant to act as curator of photography. In 1978, she became the MFAH curator, and in 1984 she was named the Gus and Lyndall Wortham Curator of Photography. She has increased the museum's holdings of photographs to over 24,000 in 2008.

Tucker organized more than forty exhibitions for the Museum of Fine Arts Houston and elsewhere, including retrospectives for Brassaï, Robert Frank, Louis Faurer, George Krause, Ray Metzker, and Richard Misrach; as well as surveys on Czech avant-garde photography, a survey of the history of Japanese photography, and a selection from the Allan Chasanoff Collection.

Many of her exhibitions led to the publication of catalogues and books of photographs. Her book The Woman's Eye includes the work of ten women photographers: Gertrude Käsebier, Frances Benjamin Johnston, Margaret Bourke-White, Dorothea Lange, Berenice Abbott, Barbara Morgan, Diane Arbus, Alisa Wells, Judy Dater and Bea Nettles. Tucker states, "The Woman's Eye represents the first major attempt to bring together notable photographs by women and to consider, through them, the role played by sexual identity both in the creation and the evaluation of photographic art." In a 2003 interview with Texas Monthly Magazine she comments: "When I wrote The Woman's Eye in 1973, very few women photographers were accepted in the elite of the field. That is no longer true. Photography has also had many important women as photo historians and curators. Nancy Newhall, Alison Gernsheim, Gisèle Freund, and Grace Mayer were some of the important early women historians. I knew Nancy Newhall and Grace Mayer and admired both very much."

Tucker retired from the Museum of Fine Arts Houston in June 2015.

== Publications ==
- The Woman's Eye (1973).
- Unknown Territory: Photographs by Ray K. Metzker. Houston: Museum of Fine Arts, 1984. ISBN 978-0890900338. Photographs by Ray Metzker. Accompanies an exhibition.
- Robert Frank: New York to Nova Scotia (1986).
- Brassaï: the eye of Paris (1999).
- This was the Photo League: compassion and the camera from the Depression to the Cold War (2001).
- Louis Faurer (2002).
- Target III, in sequence: photographic sequences from the Target Collection of American Photography (1982).
- Chaotic Harmony Contemporary Korean Photography (2009).
- War/Photography: Images of Armed Conflict and Its Aftermath. New Haven, CT: Yale University Press, 2012. ISBN 978-0300177381. Edited by Tucker and Will Michels with Natalie Zelt.
- George Krause: a Retrospective. Houston, TX: Rice University Press, 1991. ISBN 978-0892633098. Photographs by George Krause. Edited by Tucker.

== Awards ==
- 1983: Guggenheim Fellowship from the John Simon Guggenheim Memorial Foundation.
- 2001: "America's Best Curator" by Time.
- 2005: International Award from the Photographic Society of Japan.
- 2006: Focus Award for Lifetime Achievement from the Griffin Museum of Photography.
- Alumnae Achievement award from Randolph Macon Women's College.
- Fellowship from the National Endowment for the Arts.
- Fellowship from the Getty Center.
- Fellowship from the Harry Ransom Center at the University of Texas at Austin.
- Fellowship from the Dora Maar House, Ménerbes, France.
- Voted one of the top fifty most influential people in America by American Photo magazine.
- 2013: Special jury recognition, PhotoBook of the Year, Paris Photo–Aperture Foundation PhotoBook Awards for War/Photography: Images of Armed Conflict and Its Aftermath.
- 2013 Best Photography Book, Kraszna-Krausz Awards for War/Photography: Images of Armed Conflict and Its Aftermath.
- 2019: Award for Curatorship and Honorary Fellowship of the Royal Photographic Society, Bristol.
