= Aiyu Photography Club =

Japanese amateur art-photography club founded in 1912

- 愛友写真倶楽部
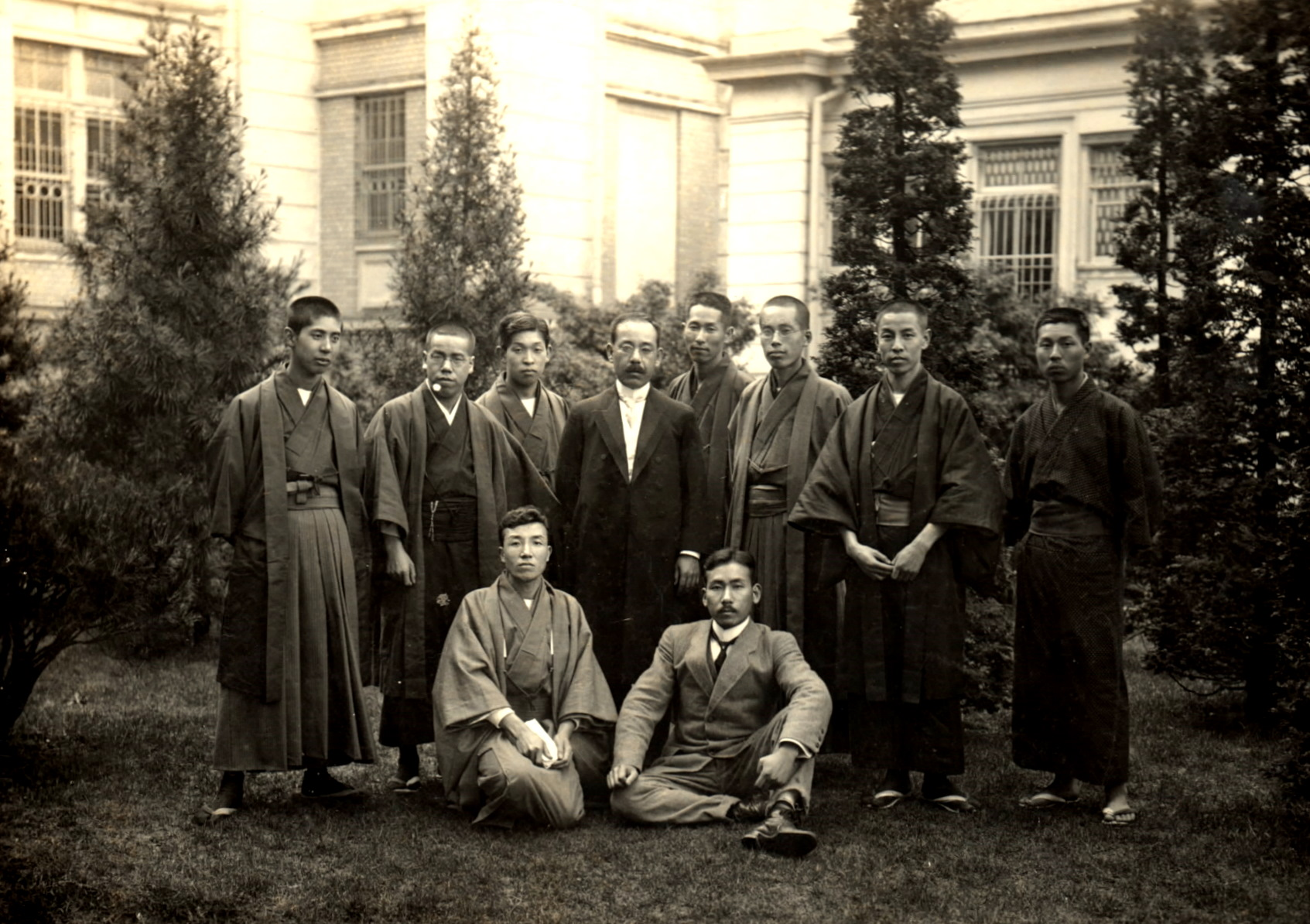
- Group photograph at the 1st Aiyū Exhibition (Nagoya), May 1915
- Formation: 1912
- Type: Amateur art-photography club
- Location: Nagoya, Japan

Aiyu Photography Club (Japanese: 愛友写真倶楽部, Hepburn: Aiyū Shashin Kurabu) was an amateur art-photography club founded in 1912 in Nagoya, Japan.

In museum scholarship on Nagoya’s photographic culture, the club is treated as a starting point for modern photographic expression in the city and as a leading force in Japan’s pictorialism (art-photography) movement during the 1920s.

Works by early members of the club have been surveyed and exhibited by the Nagoya City Art Museum, and surviving prints (including works by founder Chōtarō Hidaka and cofounder Gorō Yamamoto) are held there, including works in private collections on deposit at the museum.

A Nagoya City Art Museum publication notes that the club’s secretariat was located at Yamamoto Gorō Shoten (山本五郎商店) on Hirokōji in central Nagoya, linking the club’s activities to the photographic-supply shop associated with photographer Gorō Yamamoto. Biographical accounts also identify Gorō Yamamoto as the father of the avant-garde photographer and poet Kansuke Yamamoto.

== Name ==
The club’s Japanese name is 愛友写真倶楽部 (Aiyū Shashin Kurabu). In English, the long vowel in Aiyū is often written without a macron (Aiyu) in headings and page titles, while macrons may be used in running text for Hepburn romanization consistency.

== Background ==
=== Pictorialism and “art photography” in Japan ===
In Japan, geijutsu shashin (“art photography”) developed in dialogue with the international Pictorialist movement. Museum scholarship on Aiyū Photo Club describes Pictorialism as a late-19th-century movement that began in France and spread internationally, seeking to express the artist’s emotion and aesthetic sensibility through photography. It also notes that as photography became widely accessible in the late Meiji era—with the spread of the dry plate and other technologies—amateur photographers organized clubs across Japan, creating a social and exhibition culture that supported “art photography.”

=== Nagoya’s photographic culture in the early 20th century ===
In the early 1910s, photographers in Nagoya sought to build a durable local base for “art photography” outside Tokyo. According to a later study of Nagoya’s photographic movement history, photographer Chōtarō Hidaka argued in 1911 that Nagoya needed a “prominent” photo organization and even called for making the city a kind of “photography capital,” rather than accepting what he criticized as complacency in local photographic practice.

Aiyu Photography Club was founded in Nagoya in 1912 as one such effort. The Nagoya City Art Museum’s catalogue on the club describes it as an “art photography” association centered on Hidaka, and characterizes the group’s activities as presenting high-level work while leading Japanese photographic art in that period. A chronology in the same catalogue records that a founding meeting was held in January 1912, where organizers agreed on the club name and policies, including regular meetings, seasonal excursions, and an annual exhibition; attendees included photographer and photographic-materials merchant Gorō Yamamoto. The chronology further notes that early monthly meetings were held at venues including Yamamoto’s camera shop (Yamamoto Gorō Shoten).

== History ==
=== Founding (1912) ===
Museum scholarship on early twentieth-century photography in Nagoya traces the beginnings of the club to a small circle of local enthusiasts who began meeting informally in 1912 and soon organized themselves as an “art photography” (geijutsu shashin) association.

A chronology of the club records that after a photo excursion to Tajimi (Kokeizan) in January 1912, the organizers held a meeting that adopted the name Aiyū Shashin Kurabu (愛友写真倶楽部); those present included photographer and photographic-materials merchant Gorō Yamamoto alongside Chōtarō Hidaka, Shiei Sano, and others. The same chronology notes that early monthly meetings were held at venues including Yamamoto’s camera shop (Yamamoto Gorō Shoten).

A biographical essay on Yamamoto’s son, the avant-garde photographer and poet Kansuke Yamamoto, likewise describes Gorō Yamamoto as the owner of a photo-supply shop in Nagoya and a cofounder of the Aiyu Photography Club.

=== Meetings, outings, and annual exhibitions ===
From its early years, the club combined regular critique-oriented gatherings with fieldwork. Accounts in later exhibition catalogues describe a pattern of meetings (held at members’ homes) alongside outdoor shooting excursions, including organized outings to locations in and around Aichi and neighboring regions. In January 1916 the club formalized aspects of its routine, setting a fixed monthly meeting date, committing to hold an annual exhibition, and deciding to publish a collaborative album (Aiyū gashū / 愛友画集) drawn from prizewinning prints shown at meetings and exhibitions.

The club’s annual exhibitions became its most public-facing activity. The first Aiyū Exhibition (愛友展) was held in Nagoya in May 1915; subsequent numbered exhibitions followed in later years, including the second exhibition in May 1917 and the third in May 1920 (with the latter introducing a two-part display format separating juried selections from an all-members section). The fourth exhibition (July 1921) attracted submissions from outside the immediate region, and by the early 1920s the club was also mounting exhibitions in Tokyo, including shows at Shiseido Gallery in Ginza (e.g., the fifth exhibition in 1922 and the sixth in 1923).

By the mid-1920s, Aiyū was participating in intercity exchanges as one of the three major photography clubs in Japan. A later history of the Chūkyō photography world records that on 22 and 23 November 1925, Aiyū joined the Tokyo Photography Research Society and the Naniwa Photography Club in a joint shooting excursion in the Shizuoka area; the account describes the three organizations as Japan’s “three major clubs” and notes that Aiyū sent ten participants.

=== Organization and administration ===
The club’s programming mixed exhibition-making with instruction and technical exchange. Sources note, for example, that the club organized a public workshop on the gum printing process (gamu inga-hō) in 1920, reflecting the group’s interest in Pictorialist printing techniques (including gum and bromoil processes) that were also increasingly represented among works submitted at meetings. The club also maintained publication activity through multiple issues of Aiyū gashū (愛友画集), issued in connection with its exhibition culture and internal awards system.

By 1921, the club had established a recurring jury structure for its exhibitions: a set of five members served as judges and continued to take on that role in subsequent editions, indicating a more formalized administrative framework as the exhibitions expanded in scale and geographic reach.

== Style and techniques ==
=== Pictorialist aesthetics ===
The club’s work developed within Japan’s geijutsu shashin (“art photography”) culture, which emerged in dialogue with the international Pictorialist movement and sought painterly and emotional effects rather than purely descriptive records. A Nagoya City Art Museum publication frames Aiyū’s achievements not only as a major contribution to Japanese photographic history, but also as an important case for considering the globally developed Pictorialist movement and later photographic expression.

A recurring motif associated with the club’s “Aiyū style” was landscape—especially mountain-and-river scenery—rendered through pigment-based printing methods and, increasingly, soft-focus depiction and retouching. In an essay on the club, museum scholarship describes this period as the attainment of a Japanese form of Pictorialism grounded in advanced print work, noting that Aiyū’s gum-printed mountain landscapes became emblematic of the group’s aesthetic reputation (“Aiyū no gomu”).

=== Printing processes (gum, bromoil, etc.) ===
Aiyū Photo Club favored pigment printing processes (pigment processes) that were widely embraced by Pictorialist photographers for the degree of manual control they offered over tone, texture, and local adjustments. The catalogue’s technical glossary defines pigment printing as a family of methods (including gum, bromoil, and carbon printing) that use dichromate-sensitized colloids mixed with pigments; it notes that gum printing typically uses water-soluble pigments, while bromoil printing uses oil-based inks.

In the club’s internal practice, museum scholarship identifies the mid-1910s as a turning point: works made with gum and bromoil processes increasingly appeared in monthly meetings, and the club’s reputation became closely tied to gum prints in particular. A later article reprinted in the same catalogue is cited as contrasting regional “strengths” in pictorial printing (e.g., asserting that one major club excelled in oil processes while Aiyū excelled in gum), suggesting that Aiyū’s gum prints were widely recognized as characteristic of Japan’s Pictorialist moment.

The same technical glossary summarizes gum printing as a process in which the maker can intervene during development (for example, selectively removing areas or adding textures), a feature that made it especially attractive to photographers pursuing painterly effects; it also explains bromoil printing as an ink-based method using the swelling properties of gelatin on bromide paper to receive or repel oil ink according to tonal values.

== Key members ==
Aiyū Photo Club was formed in 1912 around photographer Chōtarō Hidaka (日高長太郎) and Shiei Sano (佐野紫影), as part of a broader amateur “art photography” club culture that developed in Japan during the late Meiji and Taishō periods.

Biographical accounts also identify photographer and photo-supply merchant Gorō Yamamoto (山本五郎 (Yamamoto Gorō)) as a cofounder; a Nagoya City Art Museum publication records that the club’s secretariat was located at his shop, Yamamoto Gorō Shoten (山本五郎商店), on Hirokōji in central Nagoya. Gorō Yamamoto was the father of the avant-garde photographer and poet Kansuke Yamamoto.

A Nagoya City Art Museum catalogue highlights the following early-generation members in connection with the club’s Pictorialist output and surviving prints:

- Chōtarō Hidaka (日高長太郎) – founder and leading figure in the club’s early activities.
- Gorō Yamamoto (山本五郎 (Yamamoto Gorō)) – cofounder; owner of Yamamoto Gorō Shoten, where the club’s secretariat was located; father of Kansuke Yamamoto.
- Shiei Sano (佐野紫影) – early organizer associated with the club’s formation.
- Matsutarō Ōhashi (大橋松太郎) – early member associated with the club’s “art photography” circle.
- Aitarō Mashiko (益子愛太郎) – member listed among the early-generation circle in museum publications.
- Kōyō Matsuura (松浦幸陽) – early member and later active in organizational roles noted in chronologies.
- Aoba Sakakibara (榊原青葉) – member noted in chronologies for technical instruction and club activities.

== Exhibitions and publications ==
Aiyū Photo Club’s public presence centered on numbered annual (and later periodic) exhibitions (愛友展), supplemented by albums and related publications produced in connection with meetings and exhibitions.

=== Aiyu exhibitions ===
Selected milestones from the club’s exhibition history include:

- 1915 – The 1st Aiyū Exhibition (第1回愛友展) held in Nagoya.
- 1920 – The 3rd Aiyū Exhibition (第3回愛友展, 7–9 May, Ito Gofukuten / 伊藤呉服店, Nagoya); from this exhibition the club adopted a two-part format (juried selections and an all-members section).
- 1922 – The 5th Aiyū Exhibition (第5回愛友展, 26–30 May, Ito Gofukuten, Nagoya); later the same year a selection was shown in Tokyo at Shiseido (Ginza).
- 1923 – The 6th Aiyū Exhibition (第6回愛友展, July, Ito Gofukuten, Nagoya); a selection was also exhibited in Tokyo at Shiseido (Ginza).
- 1927 – The 10th Aiyū Exhibition (第10回愛友展, 15–18 September, Matsuzakaya, Nagoya); records note that works included gum prints and bromoil prints alongside bromide prints, and a selection was exhibited at Osaka Asahi Shimbunsha (24–26 October).
- 1928 – The 11th Aiyū Exhibition (第11回愛友展, 23–25 November, Itō Bank “Central Branch” / 伊藤銀行中支店).
- 1929 – The 12th Aiyū Exhibition (第12回愛友展, 29–30 October, Matsuzakaya, Nagoya).

=== Albums / catalogues / magazines ===
The club’s publication activity included collaboratively produced albums compiled from prizewinning and exhibition prints:

- Aiyū gashū (愛友画集 (Aiyū gashū)) – a collaborative album series discussed in club chronologies and linked to the club’s internal awards and exhibition culture.
- 1918 – Publication of Aiyū gashū volume 2 (第2輯) is recorded in club chronologies.
- 1920 – Publication of Aiyū gashū volume 3 (第3輯), with publisher listed as Gorō Yamamoto (山本五郎).
- 1927 – Publication of Aiyū gashū (愛友画集), with editor/publisher recorded as Niryū Nagata (永田二龍).

== Reception ==
During the 1920s, Aiyū Photo Club’s exhibitions and printing practices became closely identified with Japanese Pictorialism. In an essay for the Nagoya City Art Museum’s 1990 catalogue, photography critic Ryūichi Kaneko describes how the club’s “look” (shafū)—centered on soft-focus imagery and pigment processes such as gum and bromoil—came to represent the broader style of Japanese Pictorialist photography, and notes that the phrase “Aiyū no gomu” (“Aiyū’s gum [prints]”) became current in this period.

A Nagoya City Art Museum greeting in the same catalogue frames the club as having “led” Japanese photographic art through the presentation of high-level prints, and positions its work as important not only for Japan’s photo history but also for thinking about the international Pictorialism movement and modern photographic expression.

== Legacy ==
Later museum and scholarly accounts treat Aiyū Photo Club as a foundational organization for understanding both Nagoya’s early modern photographic culture and the development of Japanese Pictorialism.

=== Role in Nagoya photography history ===
In Kaneko’s account, early-20th-century Nagoya had multiple photographic circles but lacked the sustained activity seen in Tokyo or Osaka; the founding of Aiyū Photo Club in 1912 is presented as a deliberate attempt to establish a durable base for “art photography” in the city. The same account highlights that the founding circle included the photographic-materials merchant Gorō Yamamoto (山本五郎 (Yamamoto Gorō)), described as a pioneer of photographic supply in Nagoya, underscoring the close ties between the city’s emerging photographic culture and the commercial infrastructure that supported it.

These ties are also reflected in the club’s practical organization: a Nagoya City Art Museum publication records that the club’s secretariat was located at Yamamoto’s shop, Yamamoto Gorō Shoten (山本五郎商店), on Hirokōji in central Nagoya.

Local histories also show how Aiyū's membership connected to later phases of Nagoya photography. Minayoshi Takada exhibited at the third Aiyū exhibition in 1920 as a non-member and joined the club afterward, later co-founding VIVI in postwar Nagoya, while Seikō Samizo showed Piano in the same exhibition and is later identified as a club member; he later became one of the founding members of Nagoya Photo Avant-Garde.

=== Place within Japanese pictorialism ===
Museum scholarship on the club places it squarely within the Japanese “art photography” (geijutsu shashin) boom that developed in dialogue with international Pictorialism. The Nagoya City Art Museum’s 1990 catalogue notes that Pictorialism—originating in France and becoming a world-scale movement—spread among amateur photographers in Japan, and presents Aiyū Photo Club as a major vehicle for the movement’s “golden age” aesthetics in Nagoya.

Kaneko further argues that the club’s technical emphasis on pigment processes (notably gum and bromoil) and soft-focus imagery provided a basis for what he calls a distinctly “Japanese” achievement of Pictorialism, with Hidaka Chōtarō’s gum-printed mountain landscapes described as one peak of this approach.

=== Connections to Kansuke Yamamoto ===
Aiyū Photo Club is also connected to the later Nagoya avant-garde scene (see Nagoya Photo Avant-Garde) through Gorō Yamamoto’s family. A chronology of the avant-garde photographer and poet Kansuke Yamamoto records that Kansuke was born in 1914 as Gorō Yamamoto’s eldest son, and states that Gorō Yamamoto was a founding member of “Aiyū Shashin Kurabu” (愛友寫眞俱樂部) and served as its representative during the Taishō period.

Biographical accounts likewise describe Gorō Yamamoto as a cofounder of Aiyū Photo Club and the owner of a photo-supply shop in Nagoya (Yamamoto Gorō Shoten), positioning the club and the shop as part of the local photographic environment from which Kansuke Yamamoto later emerged.

== Collections and archives ==
Materials relating to Aiyū Photo Club—including original Pictorialist prints and documentary records—have been surveyed and exhibited by the Nagoya City Art Museum. The museum’s 1990 exhibition and accompanying catalogue Hidaka Chōtarō to Aiyū Shashin Kurabu: Geijutsu shashin no ōgonki presented newly identified gum- and bromoil-process original prints by the club’s first generation, together with approximately 70 related works and documents loaned by collectors and other stakeholders. The catalogue also provides a detailed chronology of the club’s activities and publications and remains a core reference for research on early twentieth-century photographic culture in Nagoya.

The museum later revisited the city's photography history in the 2021 special exhibition "Shashin no miyako" monogatari: Nagoya shashin undōshi 1911-1972 (The Movement of Modern Photography in Nagoya 1911-1972, 6 February–28 March 2021), whose official exhibition outline frames modern photographic expression in Nagoya as beginning with the activities of Aiyū Photo Club. A contemporary review notes that the exhibition opened with a first section titled Shashin geijutsu no hajime—Hidaka Chōtarō to <Aiyū Shashin Kurabu> ("The beginnings of art photography: Hidaka Chōtarō and Aiyū Photography Club").

In the exhibition catalogue's published works list, multiple surviving prints by founder Chōtarō Hidaka are recorded as being held in private collections on deposit at the Nagoya City Art Museum (e.g., 朝の小川 (1912), 日没 (1915), 松の木立 (1925)). The same works list also records that the Nagoya City Art Museum holds (in its collection) 2020 new prints of early photographs by cofounder Gorō Yamamoto, printed from his original glass-plate negatives (e.g., 渋温泉 (1920/2020)).

== See also ==
- Pictorialism
- History of photography in Japan
- Photography in Nagoya
- Nagoya City Art Museum
- Shinkō shashin
- Gorō Yamamoto
- Kansuke Yamamoto
