= Aitarō Masuko =

Japanese photographer

Aitarō Masuko (益子 愛太郎, Masuko Aitarō; 1882–1968) was a Japanese photographer.

He was a member of the Nagoya-based pictorialist Aiyu Photography Club. A club history records that the photographers who helped establish the group in 1912 included the photographic-materials merchant Gorō Yamamoto.
