= Sakuma Hanzō =

Japanese photographer

Sakuma Hanzō (佐久間 範造; 1844–1897) was a Japanese photographer.
