= Hakuyō Fuchikami =

Japanese photographer

Hakuyō Fuchikami (淵上 白陽, Fuchikami Hakuyō) (November 14, 1889 – February 8, 1960) was one of the most prominent Japanese photographers in the first half of the 20th century.

== Biography ==
Fuchikami was born in Kumamoto Prefecture and studied in Saga and Nagasaki.

In 1922 Fuchikami organized Nihon Kōga Geijutsu Kyōkai (Japan Photographic Art Association, 日本光画芸術協会) and published the first issue of the photography magazine Hakuyō (白陽). He continued the publication of this magazine until 1926.

In 1928 Fuchikami moved to Manchuria and was temporarily employed by the South Manchuria Railway Company (南満洲鉄道, 満鉄), and in 1933 became a chief editor of the Company's photography magazine Manshū Gurafu (満洲グラフ, "Pictorial Manchuria").

In 1932, with other photographers in Manchuria, Fuchikami organized Manshū Shashin Sakka Kyōkai (満洲写真作家協会, Manchuria Photographic Artists Association) and published Hikaru oka (光る丘, "Shining Hills") as its journal.

Fuchikami's Manchuria-based works grew out of Japanese pictorialism and drew inspiration from French Barbizon School paintings and 20th Century pastoralist paintings and photographs. However, after the establishment of Manchukuo in 1932 they also reflected the influence of European 'New Photography' and Soviet Constructivist photography. The Soviet periodical USSR in Construction was an especially important source of inspiration for Fuchikami's depictions of mining and industrial installations in Manchukuo.

In an article published in 2014 Philip Charrier argues that Fuchikami's depiction of Manchukuo as a timeless agricultural paradise was misleading in relation to the aggressive and disruptive industrialization and urbanization projects being carried out by the Japanese in northeast China. In the context of the times it functioned as propaganda in support of the Japanese colonial project in the region.

In 1941 Fuchikami returned to Japan and continued photography until his death.

== Exhibitions ==
- Art Deco Photography in Japan (Kosei-ha no Jidai, Shōki Modanizumu no Shashin Hyōgen, 構成派の時代 初期モダニズムの写真表現) at Nagoya City Art Museum (名古屋市美術館), 1992
- The Depicted Utopia (Ikyō no Modanizumu, 異郷のモダニズム), at Nagoya City Art Museum (名古屋市美術館), 1994
