= Société IRF =

Japanese artists and photographer society

Société IRF was an avant-garde art society founded by a group of Japanese artists and photographers based in the city of Fukuoka in 1939. Many of the founding members were photographers such as Wataru Takahashi, Zentoku Tanaka, Giichiro Konomi, and Hisashi Hisano but also included other artists such as Kenshi Ito, who was a painter, and Iwataro Koike, a craftsman. The name of the organization is a pun on the phonetic spelling of the Japanese word for ‘old’ (furui) written backwards.

The group's activities were cut short in 1940 as the intensification of the Pacific War led the Japanese government to pressure photographers, artists, and artisans to contribute to the war effort. In the years after the war, many of the members moved to larger cities while others passed away making Société IRF one of the more short-lived avant-garde art groups.

== Historical Context ==
Prior to the establishment of the organization, many of the core photographers such as Wataru Takahashi and Hisashi Hisano were also involved in other photography clubs such as the Fukuoka Rollei Club which is considered to be the predecessor of Société IRF. These photographers were highly influenced by the avant-garde photography of Shinko Shashin (The New Photography movement).

Their activities can be contextualized in the larger wave of Japanese interest in the Surrealist and Abstract art that were making their way into Japan such as Internationale Ausstellung Film und Foto exhibition in 1931 and the International Surrealist exhibition in 1937, the works of Eugene Atget and Man Ray which introduced by photography magazines such as Photo Times and Asahi Camera. The introduction of Western avant-garde photography contributed to the development of amateur photography clubs and collectives across different areas of Japan, including in Osaka (such as the Tampei Photography Club and the Naniwa Photography Club) and in Nagoya (such as the Nagoya Photo Avant-Garde).

Their exhibitions at the Fukuoka Prefectural Industrial Promotion Hall became a meeting place for many other like-minded artists to connect. Through these informal exchanges of ideas about art many other artists came together such as Koike and Ito eventually to form the core group which would go on to found the organization.

== Differences from other Japanese Photography Clubs ==
Unlike other amateur photography clubs which flourished around Japan before WWII, Société IRF was notable because of its diverse membership which included artists from different fields. Many of the photographers also contributed poetry and sketches to the journals they published. Their culturally comprehensive multi-disciplinary approach can be discerned from exhibitions that they held on subjects such as Okinawan lacquerware and child art.

The group saw itself as a cultural society, not limited to only photography but also to art at large. Members of the group would often meet to discuss their works and exchange feedback on a variety of artistic activities as they state in their declaration that their goal is to “theorize and act for the sake of arts and culture.” The group also published a magazine irf1, of which very few survive, which include not only photographs but also essays on design and crafts as well as poems by members. Zentoku Tanaka, who was an elementary school teacher, awas also active as a poet and contributed songs to the children's song magazine Akai Tori ("Red Bird").

However, many of the key members died young, were conscripted, or ultimately left Fukuoka so group ceased organized activities in 1940.

== Reception and collections ==
The group was later featured in the Fukuoka section of the 2022 Tokyo Photographic Art Museum exhibition Avant-Garde Rising: The Photographic Vanguard in Modern Japan.

Works by the Societe IRF were presented in a special exhibition from the collection of the Fukuoka Art Museum. The British Museum holds a copy of the only photographic book published by Société IRF in their collection.
