= Rice University Press =

- Parent company: Rice University
- Status: defunct
- Founded: 1985 (Original press); 2006 (Digital-only press)
- Country of origin: United States
- Headquarters location: Houston, Texas

The Rice University Press was a publishing house, a division of Rice University. Founded in 1985, the original version of the press shut down in 1996. In 2006, the organization was re-launched as the first fully digital university press in the United States.

Under its digital publication model, manuscripts were solicited, reviewed, edited and resubmitted for final approval by an editorial board of prominent scholars, but the finished books were published free of charge via Connexions, an open-source e-publishing platform. The technology offered authors a way to use multimedia to craft dynamic scholarly arguments, and to publish on-demand original works in fields of study that were increasingly constrained by print publishing.

In August 2010, Rice University confirmed that the press, despite being digital-only, had become too expensive to maintain. Rice University Press shut down operations in September 2010.

== See also ==
- Connexions, the open-source e-publishing platform
- List of English-language book publishing companies
- List of university presses
