= Takebayashi Seiichi =

Japanese photographer

Takebayashi Seiichi (武林盛一; たけばやし せいいち, 1842 – 1908) was a Japanese photographer.
