= Nagoya City Art Museum =

Museum in Nagoya, Aichi, Japan

Coordinates: 35°09′50″N 136°54′04″E

- 名古屋市美術館
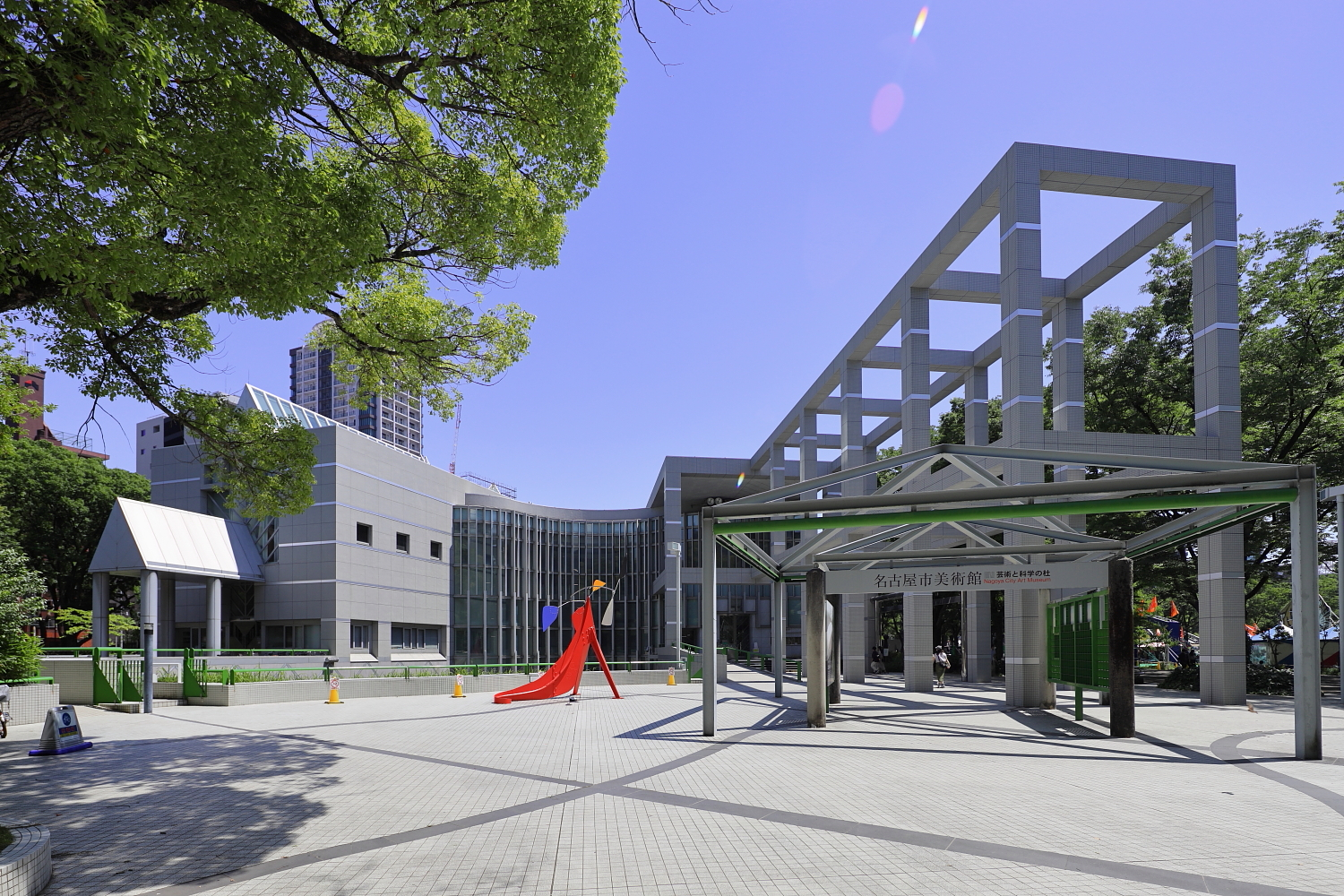
- Entrance to the Nagoya City Art Museum
- Established: 22 April 1988; 37 years ago
- Location: Shirakawa Park, 2-17-25 Sakae, Naka-ku, Nagoya, Aichi 460-0008, Japan
- Type: Art museum
- Collections: Local art from the Nagoya cultural region; École de Paris; Mexican Renaissance; postwar and contemporary art
- Collection size: 8,518 (FY2022)
- Visitors: 254,315 (FY2022)
- Architect: Kisho Kurokawa
- Website: art-museum.city.nagoya.jp

The Nagoya City Art Museum (名古屋市美術館, Nagoya-shi Bijutsukan) is an art museum in Naka-ku, Nagoya, Nagoya, Japan, located in Shirakawa Park. It opened on 22 April 1988. Designed by Kisho Kurokawa, the museum was planned in the early 1980s, while collection building began in 1983.

Its collection has developed around four principal areas: local art from the Nagoya cultural region, the École de Paris, the Mexican Renaissance, and postwar and contemporary art.

Works by the surrealist Kansuke Yamamoto, Sean Scully, and Alexander Calder belong to its permanent collection. Artists such as Hakuyō Fuchikami, Nakaji Yasui and Jean-Michel Othoniel have exhibited their works there.

== History ==
Planning for the museum dates to the 1977 Nagoya City Basic Plan, which called for the creation of an art museum. The city established a museum investigation committee in 1982, received its basic concept report in 1983, began collecting works in the same year, and commissioned the building's design to Kisho Kurokawa Architect & Associates. Construction began in 1985, the main building was completed in 1987, and the museum opened in April 1988.

== Building ==
The museum stands in Shirakawa Park on a long triangular site surrounded by trees. Kurokawa kept the building below the height of the surrounding trees, placing the permanent galleries and storage below ground and the special exhibition rooms on two floors above ground. To bring natural light into the approach to the underground galleries, the design incorporates a sunken garden. The plan is organized around a north–south main axis and a secondary axis opening to the northwest. The museum also states that the building incorporates references to Japanese traditional forms and local motifs.

== Collection ==
The museum's collection began in 1983. Its initial collecting policy focused on "local art" from the Nagoya cultural region, with the aim of tracing the history of artistic activity in and around the city. The museum later expanded this policy by adding three further collecting areas—École de Paris, the Mexican Renaissance, and contemporary art—in order to contextualize local artists, deepen the collection, and give it a more international character.

== Research and publications ==
According to the museum, its curators conduct research on artists, works, exhibitions, conservation, and viewing methods, and present the results through lectures and publications including the annual report, Art Paper, and the museum's research bulletin.

The museum has positioned photography as an important medium in its programme since opening in 1988 and has researched and exhibited the history of photography in Nagoya, including the 2021 special exhibition The Movement of Modern Photography in Nagoya 1911–1972, a project organized by curator Jō Takeba.
