= Japan Photographic Society (1924) =

Japanese photography organization

The Japan Photographic Society (日本写真会, Nihon Shashinkai) is a compact organization of photographers founded in 1924 that has continued to this day.

Unrelated to an earlier organization with the same name, the JPS grew out of the Shiseido Junior Photo Circle (シセイドウ・フォト・ジュニオル・サークル, Shiseidō Foto Junioru Sākuru) and the Kōga-kai (光画会). Founded in 1924, its first president was Shinzō Fukuhara, and its other founding members included the amateur photographers Rosō Fukuhara, Kiichirō Ishida, Isao Kakefuda, Maroni Kumazawa, Yasutarō Mori, Masajirō Sakai, Hekisui Yamanaka, and Jiichirō Yasukōchi. Among the members who joined soon after was Yasuzō Nojima, in 1926.

From 1925, the JPS has held a joint exhibition once a year.

The JPS was suspended in 1944, but restarted in 1946.

== Members ==
- Rosō Fukuhara
- Shinzō Fukuhara
- Kiyoshi Nishiyama
- Akira Toriyama

== Sources and further reading ==
- Iizawa Kōtarō. “In Search of the Poetry of Life: The Photographic World of Shinzo Fukuhara.” Pp. 117–25. In Hikari no shijō: Fukuhara Shinzō no sekai (光の詩情：福原信三の世界) / The World of Shinzo Fukuhara: Poetics of Light. Tokyo: Shiseido Corporate Culture Department, 1994. A translation of the Japanese-language text, which appears on pp. 15–24 of this bilingual exhibition catalogue.
- Matsuda Takako. “Major Photography Clubs and Associations.” In Anne Wilkes Tucker, et al. The History of Japanese Photography. New Haven: Yale University Press, 2003. ISBN 0-300-09925-8. Pp. 373.
- (in Japanese) Nihon shashinka jiten (日本写真家事典) / 328 Outstanding Japanese Photographers. Kyoto: Tankōsha, 2000. P. 347. ISBN 4-473-01750-8. Despite its alternative title in English, the text is all in Japanese.
