= Ōtaguro =

Ōtaguro, Ootaguro or Outaguro (written: 大田黒 or 太田黒) is a Japanese surname. Notable people with the surname include:

- Motoo Ōtaguro (大田黒 元雄; 1893–1979), Japanese music critic
- Ōtaguro Tomoo (太田黒 伴雄; 1836–1876), Japanese Nationalist and the leader of the Shinpūren Rebellion

== See also ==
- Ōtaguro Park, an urban park in Tokyo, Japan
