= Motoo =

- Gender: Male

Origin
- Origin: Japanese
- Meaning: Different meanings depending on the kanji used

Motoo (written: 資生, 元夫, 幹郎, 幹雄, 基男 or 統男) is a masculine Japanese given name. Notable people with the name include:

- Motoo Andoh (安藤 統男; born 1939), Japanese baseball player
- Motoo Fujii (藤井 基男), Japanese table tennis player
- Motoo Furushō (古荘 幹郎; 1882–1940), Japanese general
- Motoo Hayashi (林 幹雄; born 1947), Japanese politician
- Motoo Kimura (木村 資生; 1924–1994), Japanese biologist
- Motoo Ōtaguro (大田黒 元雄; 1893–1979), Japanese music critic
- Motoo Tatsuhara (立原 元夫; 1913–?), Japanese footballer
