= Kumazawa =

Kumazawa (written: 熊沢 or 熊澤 lit. "bear swamp") is a Japanese surname. Notable people with the surname include:

- Kumazawa Banzan (熊沢 蕃山, 1619–1691), Japanese philosopher
- Kumazawa Hiromichi (熊沢 寛道, 1889–1966), Japanese businessman
- Kazuei Kumazawa (熊沢 一衛), Japanese industrialist
- Maroni Kumazawa (熊沢 麿二, 1895–1958), Japanese photographer
