= Arinobu =

- Gender: Male

Origin
- Origin: Japanese
- Meaning: Different meanings depending on the kanji used

Arinobu (written: 有信) is a masculine Japanese given name. Notable people with the name include:

- Arinobu Fukuhara (福原 有信; 1848–1924), Japanese pharmacist and businessman
- Yamada Arinobu (山田 有信; 1544–1609), Japanese samurai
