= John Dominis =

American photographer (1921–2013)

- Born: June 27, 1921; Los Angeles, California, United States
- Died: December 30, 2013 (aged 92); Manhattan, New York, United States
- Occupations: Documentary photographer; War photographer; Photojournalist
- Relatives: Paul Dominis (Son), Dori Dominis (daughter), Greg Dominis (Son)

John Dominis (June 27, 1921 – December 30, 2013) was an American documentary photographer, war photographer and photojournalist.

== Life ==
Dominis was born 1921 in Los Angeles. He studied cinematography at the University of Southern California. In 1943 he enlisted in the United States Army Air Forces. After the war, he worked as a freelance photographer for several publications, such as Life magazine. In 1950 he went to Korea as a war photographer in the Korean War. Later he worked in Southeast Asia, in America, Africa and Europe, including President John F. Kennedy's 1963 West Berlin speech. Dominis went to six Olympic Games. One of his best-known pictures was shot during the 1968 Summer Olympics, when Dominis pictured Tommie Smith and John Carlos during their Black Power salute.

Dominis worked for Life magazine during the Vietnam War and later also went to Woodstock. In the 1970s he worked for People magazine. From 1978 to 1982 he was an editor for the Sports Illustrated. He often pictured stars like Steve McQueen or Frank Sinatra, and these photo series were later published as illustrated books. Together with Giuliano Bugialli he published several books about the Italian cuisine, with Dominis being responsible for the food photography.

In John Loengard's book Life Photographers: What They Saw, Dominis reported about the staging of his picture A leopard about to kill a baboon. The picture was shot in 1966 in Botswana when a hunter had brought a captured leopard to a bunch of baboons. Most fled immediately but one faced the leopard and was killed subsequently. Dominis was heavily criticized after the staging became public and apologized for it. He mentioned that during the 1960s the staging of pictures was very popular and he wouldn't use this method today.

Dominis died December 30, 2013, in New York City of complications from a heart attack. He was 92.

== Selected works ==
- Maitland Armstrong Edey, John Dominis: The cats of Africa. Time-life Books, 1968, 1. edition, ASIN: B00005VJIN
- Giuliano Bugialli, John Dominis: Giuliano Bugialli's Foods of Italy. Stewart Tabori & Chang, 1984, 1. edition, ISBN 978-094143-452-2
- Giuliano Bugialli, John Dominis: Foods of Sicily and Sardinia and the Smaller Islands. Rizzoli, 2002, ISBN 978-084782-502-8
- Richard B. Stolley, John Dominis: Sinatra: An Intimate Portrait of a Very Good Year. Stewart, Tabori and Chang, 2002, ISBN 978-158479-246-8
- John Dominis: Steve McQueen. Munich, Schirmer Mosel, 2009, 1. edition, ISBN 978-382960-412-3
