= Jiichirō =

- Gender: Male

Origin
- Origin: Japanese
- Meaning: Different meanings depending on the kanji used

Jiichirō, Jiichiro, Jiichiroh or Jiichirou (written: 治一郎) is a masculine Japanese given name. Notable people with the name include:

- Jiichiro Date (伊達 治一郎; born 1952), Japanese sport wrestler
- Jiichirō Matsumoto (松本 治一郎; 1887–1966), Japanese politician and businessman
- Jiichirō Yasukōchi (安河内 治一郎; 1883–1968), Japanese photographer
