= Kiyoshi Nishiyama =

Japanese photographer

Kiyoshi Nishiyama (西山 清, Nishiyama Kiyoshi; 1893–1983) was a versatile Japanese amateur photographer who specialized in landscapes.

Born in Tokyo in 1893 as Kiyonosuke Nishiyama (西山清之助), Nishiyama became interested in photography at 15. He intended to become a professional photographer and learned retouching in a photographic studio at Ryōgoku, but never turned professional, instead in 1921 setting up a photographic supplies shop, Heiwadō (平和堂), in Nihonbashi, and at about the same time starting up and leading a photographic club, the Pleasant Club (プレザントクラブ, Purezanto Kurabu), and submitting his photographs to photographic magazines.

In 1922 Nishiyama won the first prize for his submission, taken with a Vest Pocket Kodak, to a competition at the Heiwa Kinen Tōkyō Hakurankai (平和記念東京博覧会). A year later he lost all his photographs and cameras in the Great Kantō earthquake, but persevered and held the first exhibition of the Pleasant Club in 1924. Nishiyama was impressed by the "light and its harmony" aesthetic of Shinzō Fukuhara, who invited him to join the Japan Photographic Society; Nishiyama soon thereafter had a solo exhibition at the Shiseido Gallery.

From 1925 Nishiyama began the first of several series of photographs in Photo Times (フォトタイムス, Foto Taimusu) magazine; these were on a variety of subjects but most notable was Nishiyama's portrayal of the cityscape of Tokyo after the earthquake. From 1928 Shirai used a Rolleiflex camera, and turned this to photographing Nikkō and bunraku (the subjects of solo exhibitions); he later added a Leica, but from 1959 changed to a Nikon F that he always used with a 50 mm lens. Virtually all of Nishiyama's prewar work was destroyed in the bombing of Tokyo.

Nishiyama continued to exhibit and publish after the war. In 1954 he won the PSJ award, and in 1977 he was awarded the Order of the Rising Sun, 5th class, for his services to photography. He died on 5 March 1983. Nishiyama's work is held in the permanent collections of the Tokyo Metropolitan Museum of Photography and Nihon University (which preserves what little remains of Nishiyama's prewar work).

== Solo exhibitions by Nishiyama ==
- Shiseido Gallery (Ginza, Tokyo), 1920s
- "Nikkō" (日光), Matsuzakaya (Ueno, Tokyo), 1929. Photographs of Nikkō.
- "Bunraku" (文楽), Nihon Salon (Ginza, Tokyo), 1935. Photographs of bunraku.
- "Nihon no fūbutsu: Kita kara minami" (日本の風物 北から南), Matsuya (Ginza, Tokyo), 1958. Photographs of Japanese scenery.
- "Okinawa no fūbutsu" (沖縄の風物), Marunouchi Gekkō Gallery (Marunouchi, Tokyo), 1960. Photographs of Okinawan scenery.
- "Nihon no tō" (日本の塔), Marunouchi Gekkō Gallery (Marunouchi, Tokyo), 1964. Photographs of Japanese pagodas.
- "Koyomi" (こよみ), Marunouchi Gekkō Gallery (Marunouchi, Tokyo), 1973. Photographs of the calendar.

== Books by Nishiyama ==
- Arusu geijutsu shashin gashū dai-2-hen (アルス芸術写真画集 第2編 Ars art photograph collection, 2nd ed). Tokyo: Ars, 1926. (in Japanese)
- Hikinobashi no jissai (引伸の実際, The facts of enlarging). Asahi Camera Sōsho 11. Tokyo: Asahi Shinbunsha, 1936. (in Japanese)
- Kotō o tazunete (古塔を訪ねて, Visiting old pagodas). Tokyo: Jinbutsu-ōraisha, 1964. (in Japanese)
- Nihon no kotō (日本の古塔, The pagodas of Japan). Tokyo: Kenkōsha, 1972. (in Japanese)
- Shunkō shūshoku (春光秋色) / Seasonal Aspects of Japan. Sonorama Shashin Sensho 21. Tokyo: Asahi Sonorama, 1979. (in Japanese and English)
