= Arnold Newman =

American photographer (1918–2006)

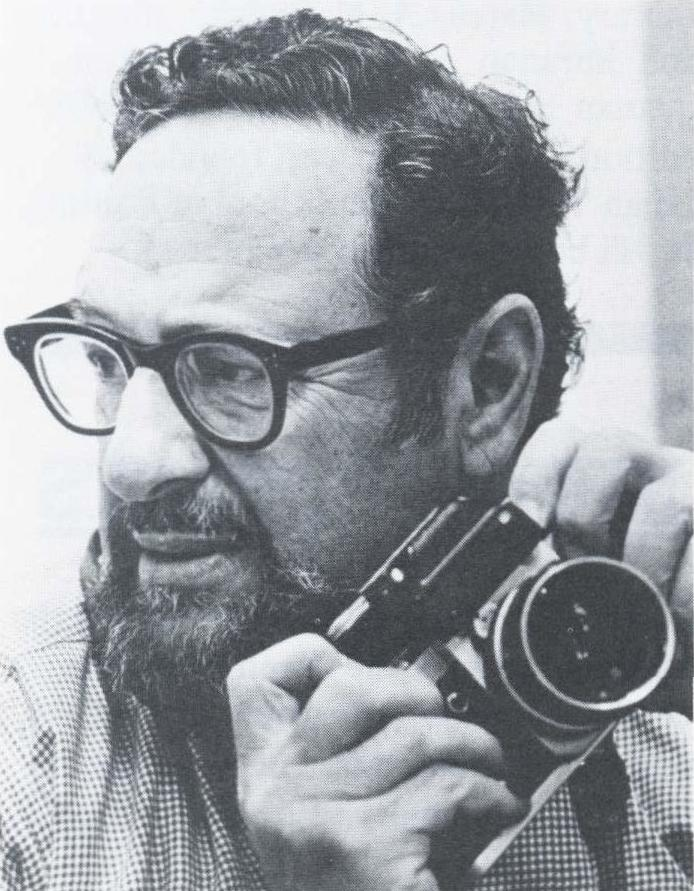
- Newman in 1981
- Born: Arnold Abner Newman; March 3, 1918; Manhattan, New York City, U.S.
- Died: June 6, 2006 (aged 88); New York City, U.S.
- Known for: Portrait Photography; News Photography; Photography Teacher
- Notable work: Fortune; Life; Newsweek
- Movement: Environmental Portraiture (founder/coined phrase)
- Awards: Infinity Award (1999); Lucie Award (2004)
- Website: arnoldnewman.com

Arnold Abner Newman (March 3, 1918 – June 6, 2006) was an American photographer, noted for his "environmental portraits" of artists and politicians. He was also known for his carefully composed abstract still life images. In 2006, he was inducted into the International Photography Hall of Fame and Museum.

== Early life and education ==
Newman was born March 3, 1918, in Manhattan to a Jewish family. He grew up in Atlantic City, New Jersey, and later moved to Miami Beach, Florida. His parents owned hotels in both Atlantic City and Miami Beach, and would spend winters in Florida and summers in New Jersey. He attended Atlantic City High School and graduated from Miami Beach Senior High School. In 1936, he studied painting and drawing at the University of Miami. Unable to afford to continue after two years, he moved to Philadelphia to work for a studio, making 49-cent portraits in 1938.

== Career ==
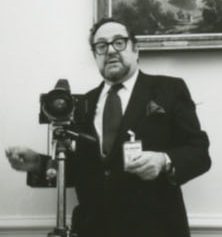
Newman photographing then President Ronald Reagan in the Oval Office in December 1981

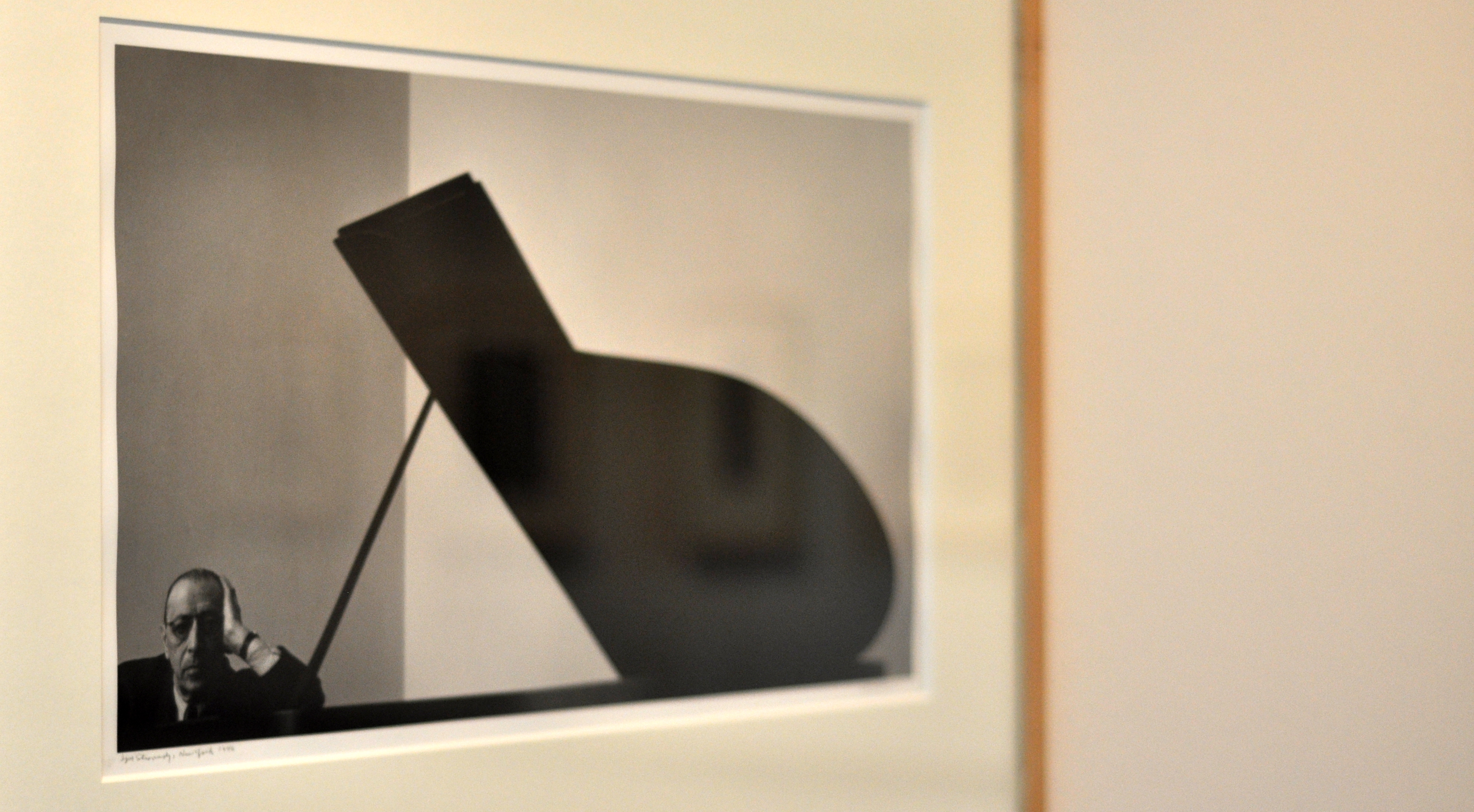
Newman's photograph of Igor Stravinsky, now housed at Louisiana Museum of Modern Art in Humlebaek, Denmark

In 1942, Newman returned to Florida to manage a portrait studio in West Palm Beach, Florida. Three years later, he opened his own business in Miami Beach.

In 1946, Newman relocated to New York City, where he opened Arnold Newman Studios and worked as a freelance photographer for Fortune, Life, and Newsweek. Though never a member, Newman frequented the Photo League during the 1940s.

Newman photographed well-known celebrities, including Marlene Dietrich, John F. Kennedy, Harry S. Truman, Piet Mondrian, Pablo Picasso, Arthur Miller, Marilyn Monroe, Ronald Reagan, Mickey Mantle, and Audrey Hepburn. However, he maintained that even if the subject is not known, or is already forgotten, the photograph itself must still excite and interest the viewer.

Newman is often credited with being the photographer who articulated and who consistently employed the genre of environmental portraiture, in which the photographer uses a carefully framed and lit setting, and its contents, to symbolize the individual's life and work; a well known example being his portrait of Igor Stravinsky in which the lid of his grand piano forms a gargantuan musical note representative of the melodic structure of the composer's work. Newman normally captured his subjects in their most familiar surroundings with representative visual elements showing their professions and personalities. A musician for instance might be photographed in their recording studio or on stage, a Senator or other politician in their office or a representative building. Using a large-format camera and tripod, he worked to record every detail of a scene.

"I didn't just want to make a photograph with some things in the background," Newman told American Photo magazine in an interview. "The surroundings had to add to the composition and the understanding of the person. No matter who the subject was, it had to be an interesting photograph. Just to simply do a portrait of a famous person doesn't mean a thing."

Newman's best-known images were in black and white, although he often photographed in color. His 1946 black and white portrait of Stravinsky seated at a grand piano became his signature image, even though it was rejected by Harper's Bazaar, the magazine that gave the assignment to Newman. He was one of the few photographers allowed to make a portrait of the famously camera-shy Henri Cartier-Bresson.

Among Newman's best-known color images is an eerie portrait from 1963 that shows former Nazi industrialist and minister of armament Alfried Krupp in one of Krupp's factories. Newman admits his personal feelings influenced his portrayal of Krupp.

Newman taught photography at Cooper Union for many years.

On December 19, 2005, Newman made his last formal portrait of director James Burrows at the NBC studio on the Saturday Night Live stage. This session was particularly special for Newman because he had photographed Burrows' father Abe Burrows several times.

== Death ==
Newman was recovering from a stroke at Mt. Sinai Medical Center in New York City, when he died on June 6, 2006.

== Bibliography ==
- Newman, Arnold (1974), One mind's eye : the portraits and other photographs of Arnold Newman, Little, Brown and Co, ISBN 978-0-8212-0732-1
- Danziger, James; Conrad, Barnaby, III, 1952- (1977), Interviews with master photographers: Minor White, Imogen Cunningham, Cornell Capa, Elliott Erwitt, Yousuf Karsh, Arnold Newman, Lord Snowdon, Brett Weston, Paddington Press : Distributed by Grosset & Dunlap
- Newman, Arnold (1980). Artists: Portraits from Four Decades (First ed.). Little Brown & Co. ISBN 978-0821210994.
- Newman, Arnold; Sobieszek, Robert A., 1943- (1984), Arnold Newman, Collins, ISBN 978-0-00-411955-7
- Newman, Arnold; Ollman, Arthur; Museum of Photographic Arts (San Diego, Calif.) (1986), Arnold Newman, five decades (1st ed.), Harcourt Brace Jovanovich, ISBN 978-0-15-107900-1
- Newman, Arnold; Weber, Bruce, 1951-; Norton Gallery and School of Art (1988), Arnold Newman in Florida (1st ed.), D.R. Godine in association with Norton Gallery of Art, ISBN 978-0-87923-740-0
- Newman, Arnold; Sidney Janis Gallery (1988), Arnold Newman : collages, vintage prints, recent photographs, Sidney Janis Gallery
- Newman, Arnold; Brookman, Philip (2006), Arnold Newman, Taschen, ISBN 978-3-8228-2592-1
- Flukinger, Roy; Fulton, Marianne (Introduction) (2013). Arnold Newman: At Work (Harry Ransom Center Photography Series) (First ed.). Austin: University of Texas Press. ISBN 978-0292744912.
- Newman, Arnold; Heisler, Gregory, (Afterword.) (2018), Arnold Newman : one hundred, Radius Books; New York, NY : Howard Greenberg Gallery, ISBN 978-1-942185-52-9
- Newman, Arnold; Komanecky, Michael; William A. Farnsworth Library and Art Museum (2010), Arnold Newman artists' photographs, David R. Godine, ISBN 978-1-56792-415-2

== Awards ==
- 1985 Missouri Honor Medal for Distinguished Service in Journalism, Missouri School of Journalism, University of Missouri, Columbia, Missouri
- 1999 Infinity Award for Master of Photography, International Center of Photography, Manhattan
- 2004 Lucie Award for Outstanding Achievement in Portrait Photography, International Photography Awards program, Los Angeles, California
- 2004 He was awarded The Royal Photographic Society's Centenary Medal and Honorary Fellowship (HonFRPS) in recognition of a sustained, significant contribution to the art of photography.
- 2006 Newman was inducted into the International Photography Hall of Fame and Museum
