= Pirie MacDonald =

American photographer

Pirie MacDonald HonFRPS
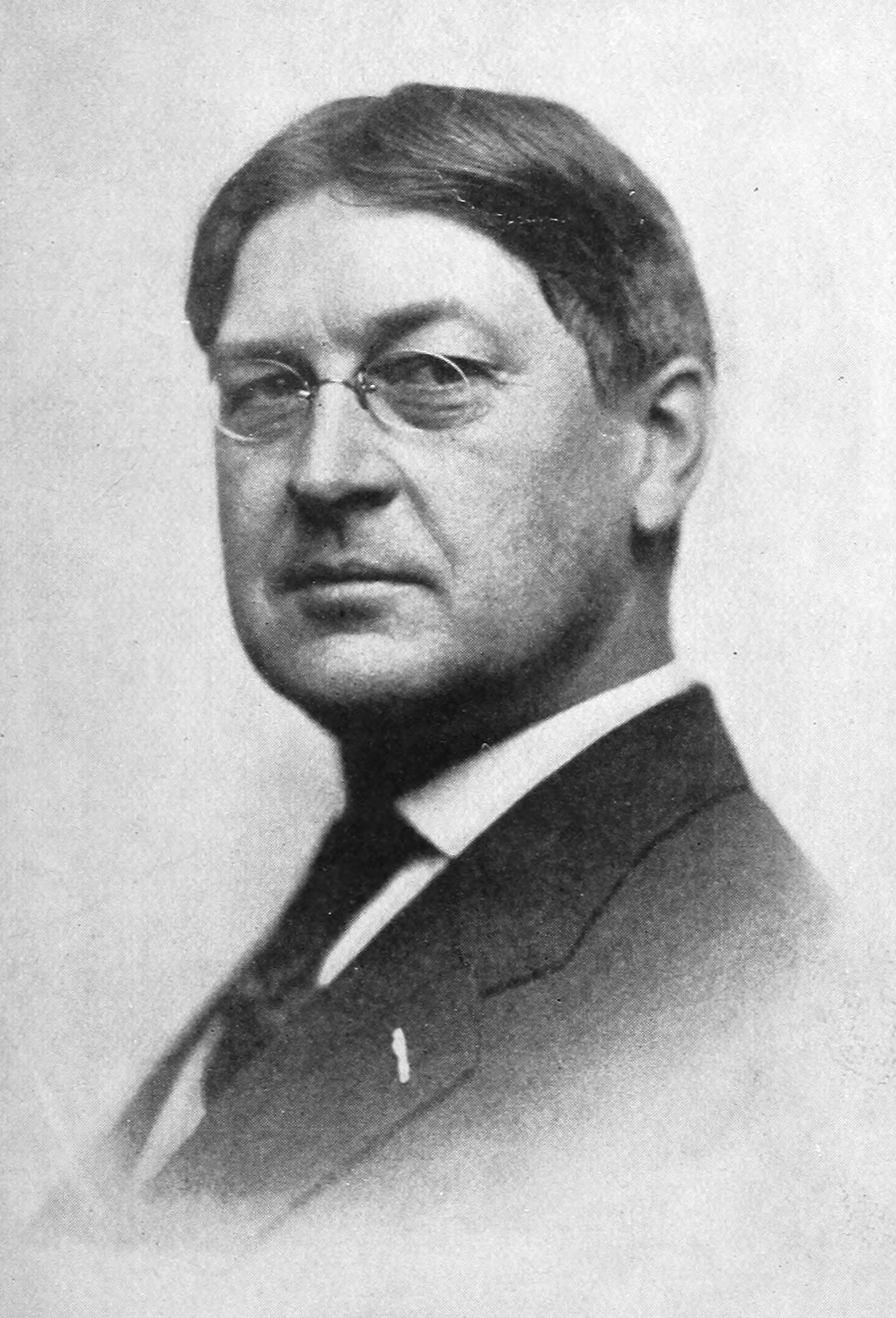
- MacDonald in 1909
- Born: Ian Pirie MacDonald; January 27, 1867; Chicago, Illinois, U.S.
- Died: April 22, 1942 (aged 75); New York City, U.S.
- Occupation: Photographer
- Known for: Early and mid-20th century portraiture

Signature
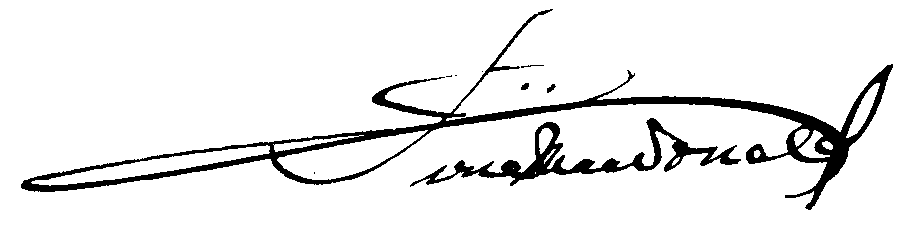

Ian Pirie MacDonald HonFRPS (January 27, 1867 – April 22, 1942) was an American portrait photographer, New York City civic leader, and peace advocate. He photographed over 70,000 men in the span of his career, including international heads of state, religious leaders, and artists.

== Photography career ==
Born in Chicago, MacDonald moved to Hudson, New York in 1883, where he worked as a photographer's apprentice prior to opening his own studio in Albany. Upon gaining a reputation in portraiture, MacDonald made the decision to only photograph men, a decision that even applied to family photos, and from that point on dubbed himself "Pirie MacDonald – Photographer of Men". His prolific body of work encompasses many well-known men of the early to mid-20th century including Spencer Trask, Woodrow Wilson, William Ralph Inge, Seán O'Casey and Antoine Lumiére, all of which were taken within New York City save for Tomáš Garrigue Masaryk and Christian X of Denmark. When asked about his most memorable portrait sittings, he listed Theodore Roosevelt as his most difficult subject.

== Personal life ==
MacDonald married Emilie Van Dusen in 1890. Heavily involved in the Boy Scouts of America organization, he founded the Norwalk Boy Scouts and maintained a camp for the scouts on his White Oak Shade estate in Norwalk, Connecticut.

MacDonald had a cerebral hemorrhage at White Oak Shade on April 18, 1942, and died at a New York hospital four days later. In accordance with his wishes, all photographic negatives of his works were destroyed.

== Gallery ==
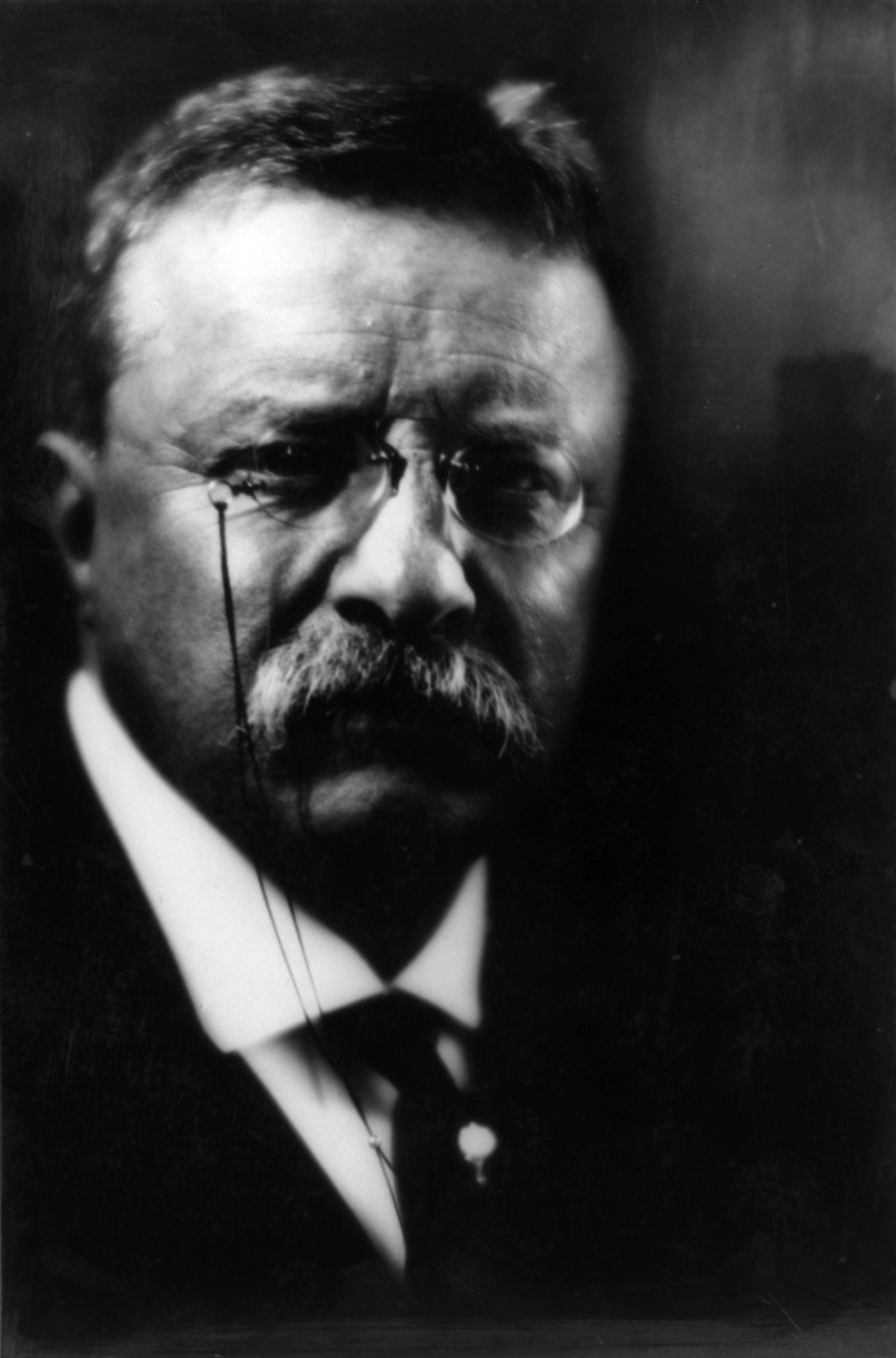
Theodore Roosevelt
US President

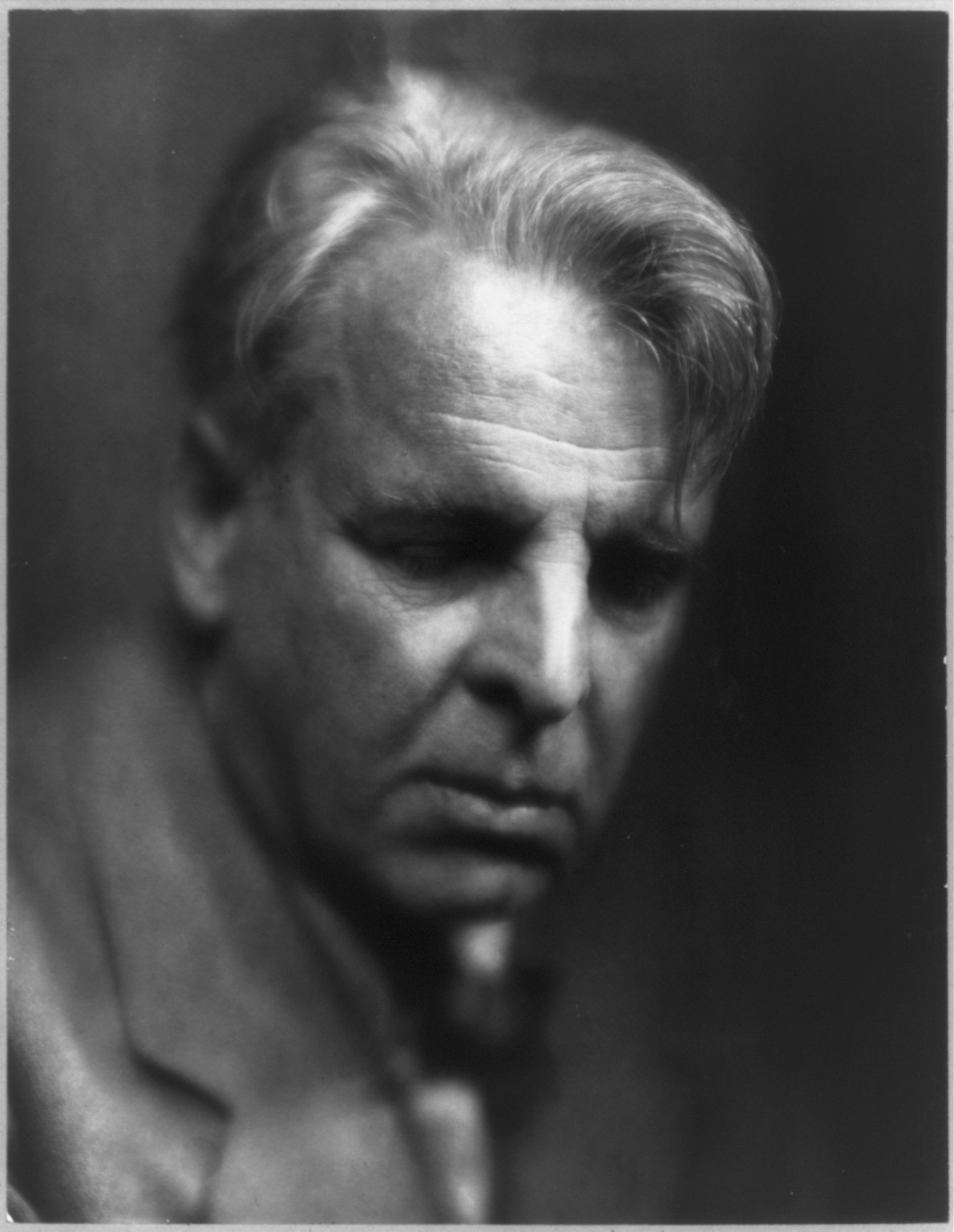
William Butler Yeats
Poet

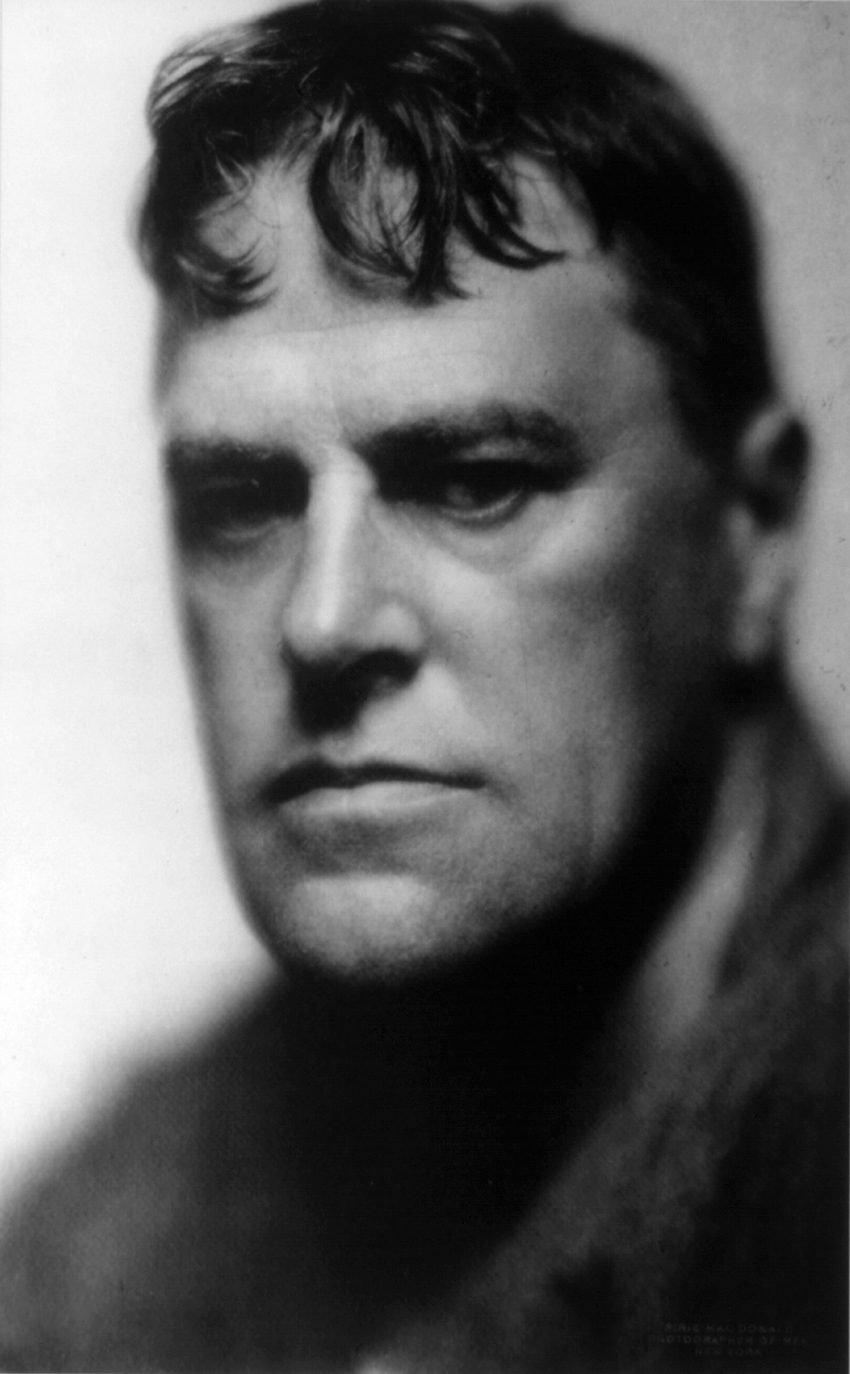
Albert Payson Terhune
Writer

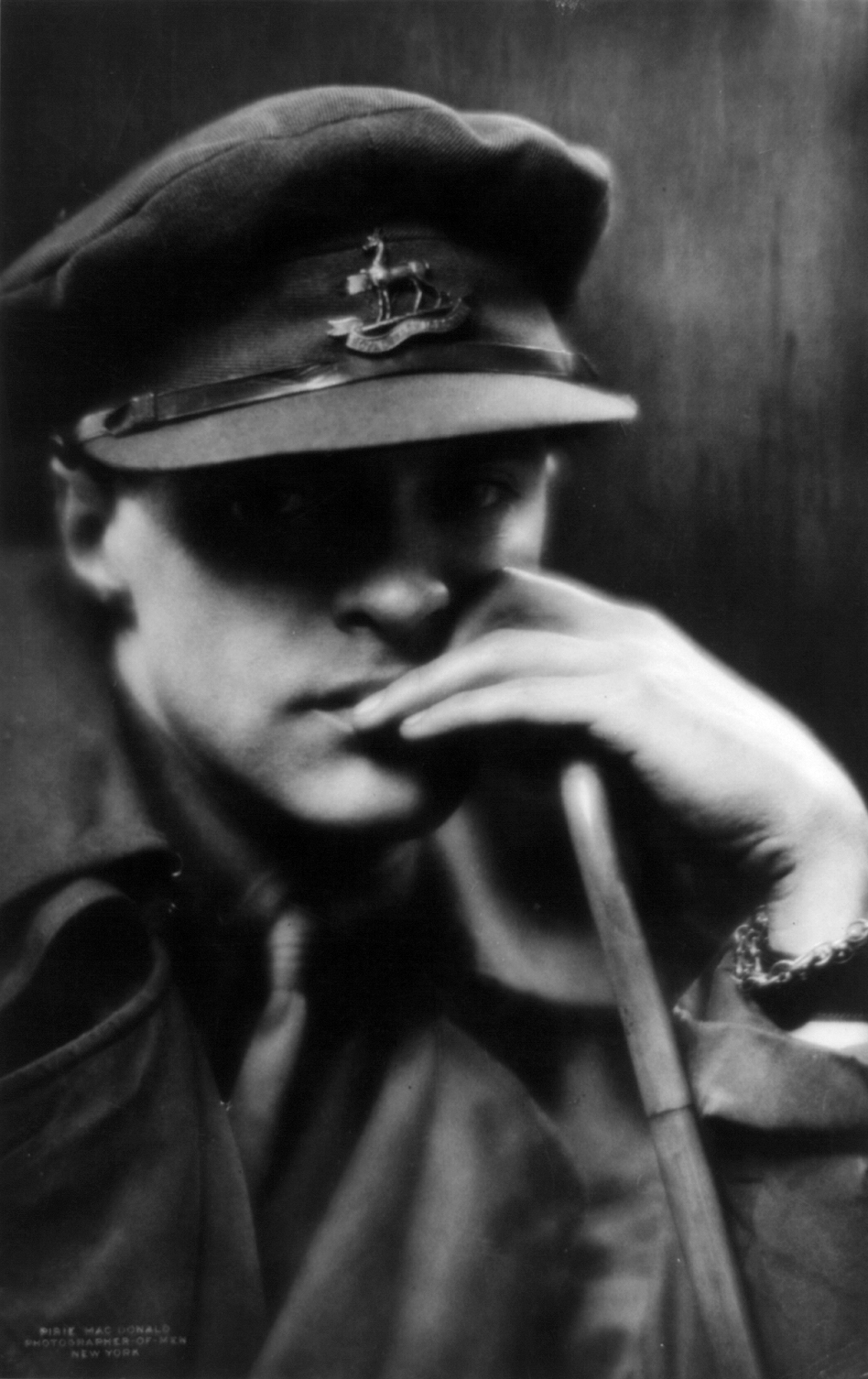
Bruce Bairnsfather
Cartoonist

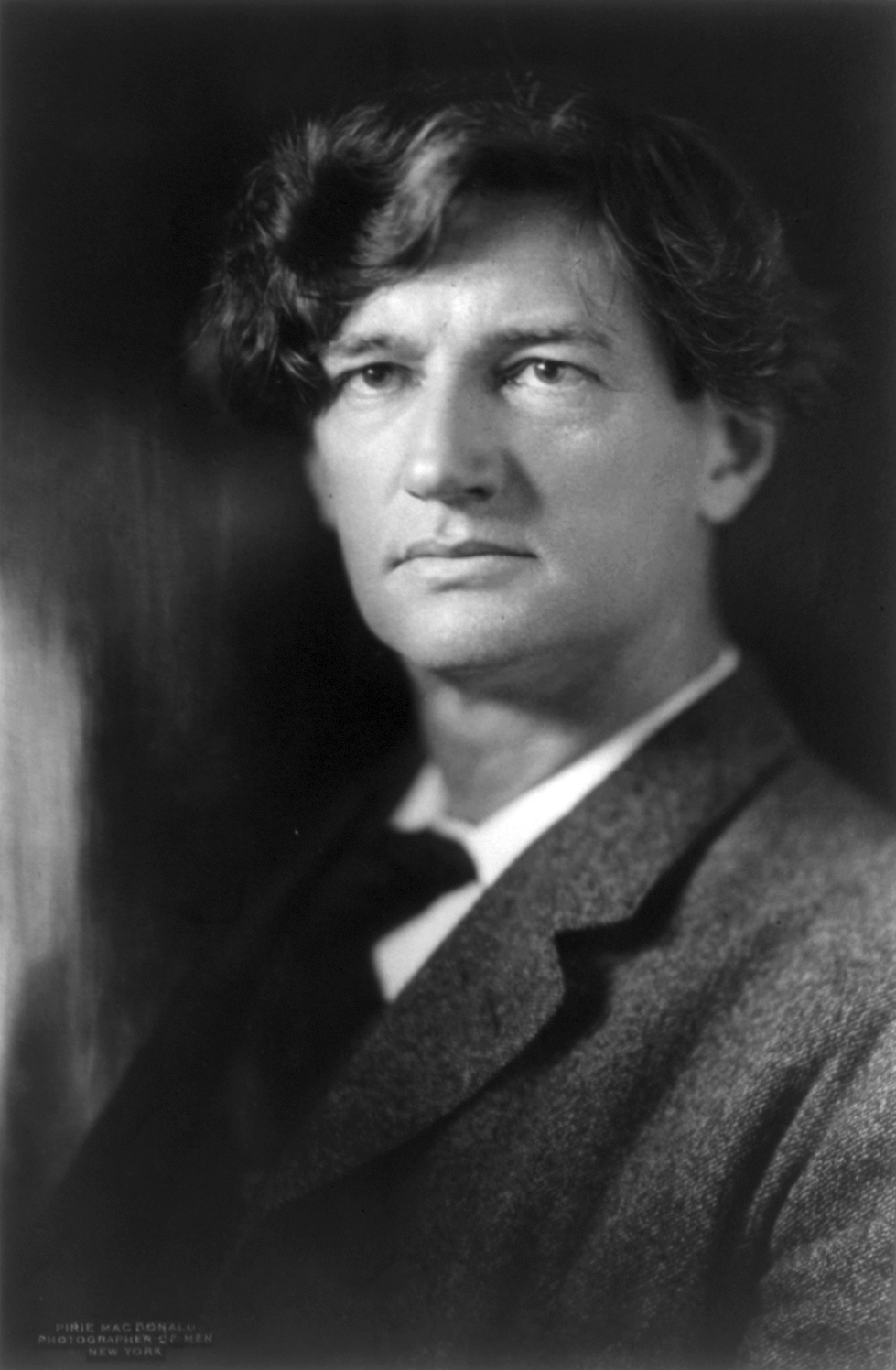
Bliss Carman
Poet

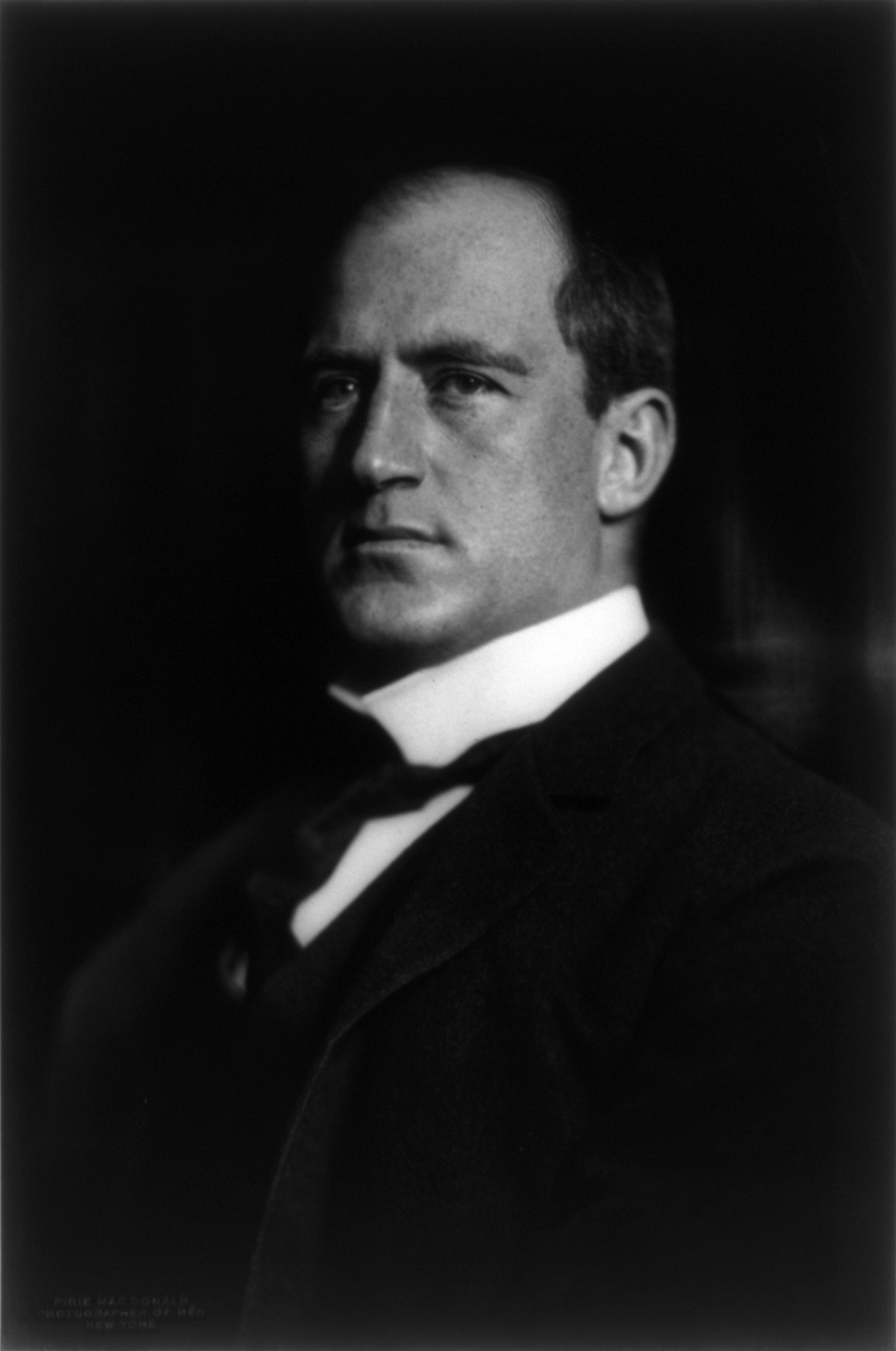
Charles Dana Gibson
Illustrator

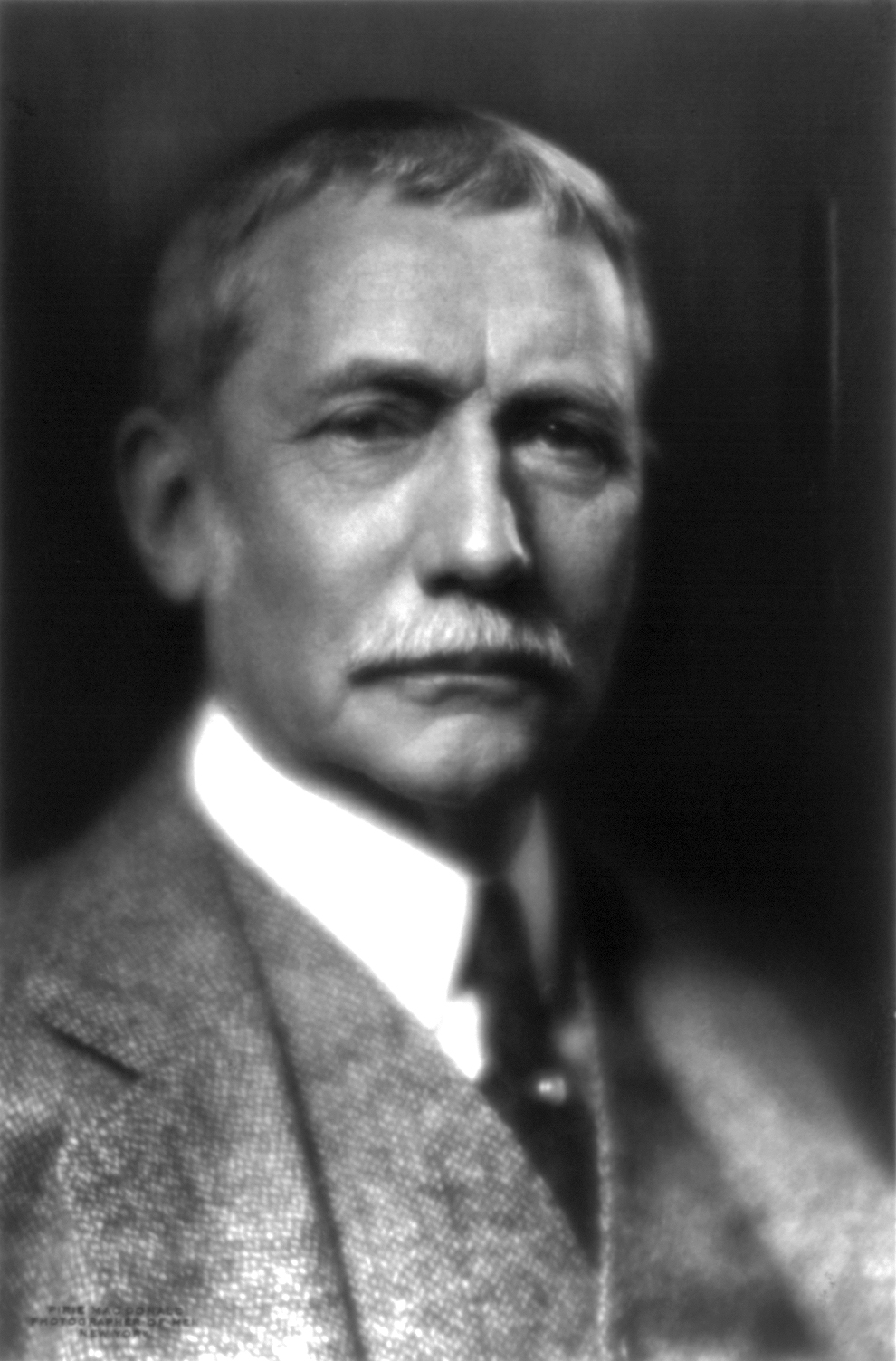
Elihu Root
Statesman

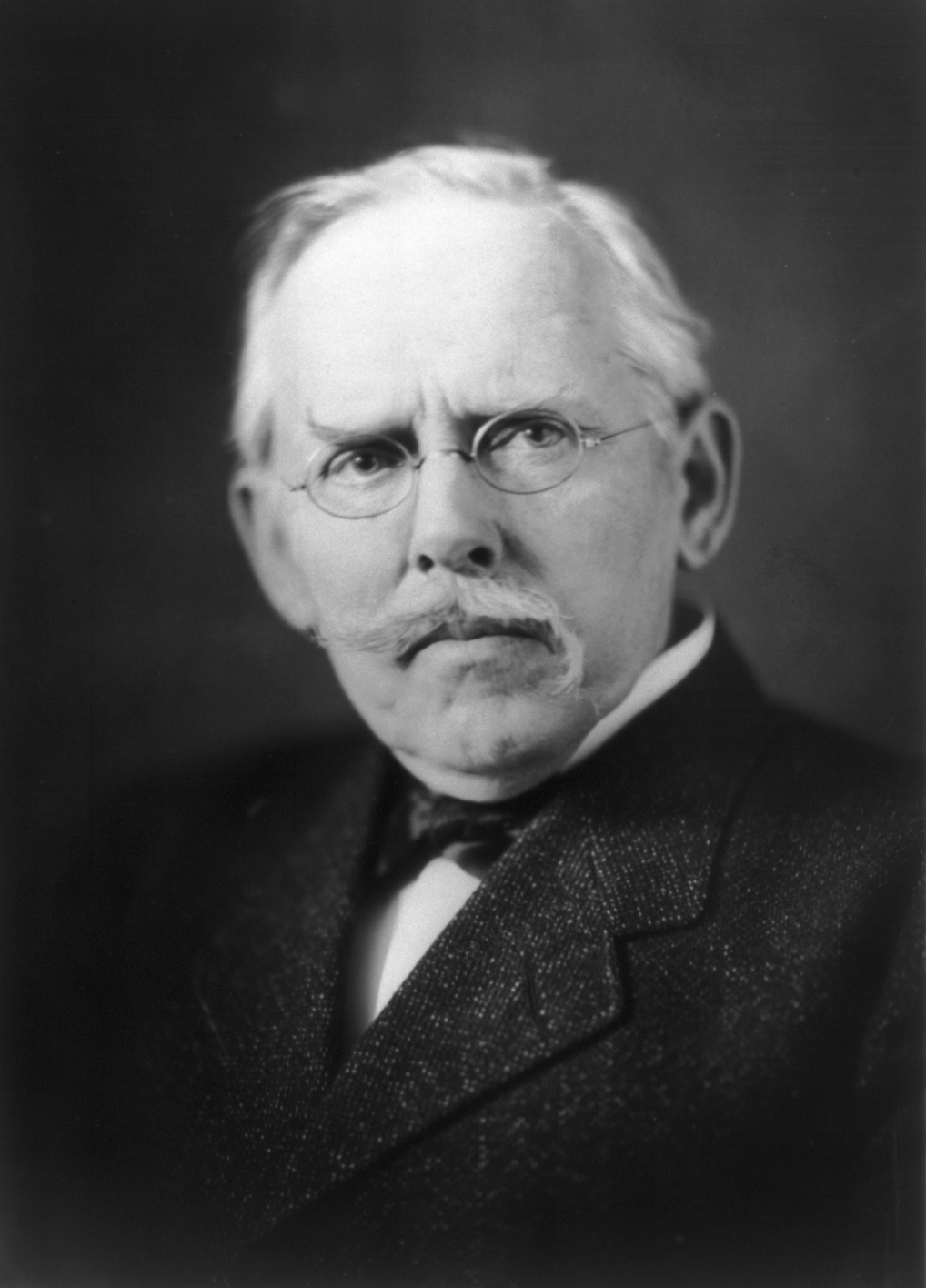
Jacob Riis
Journalist

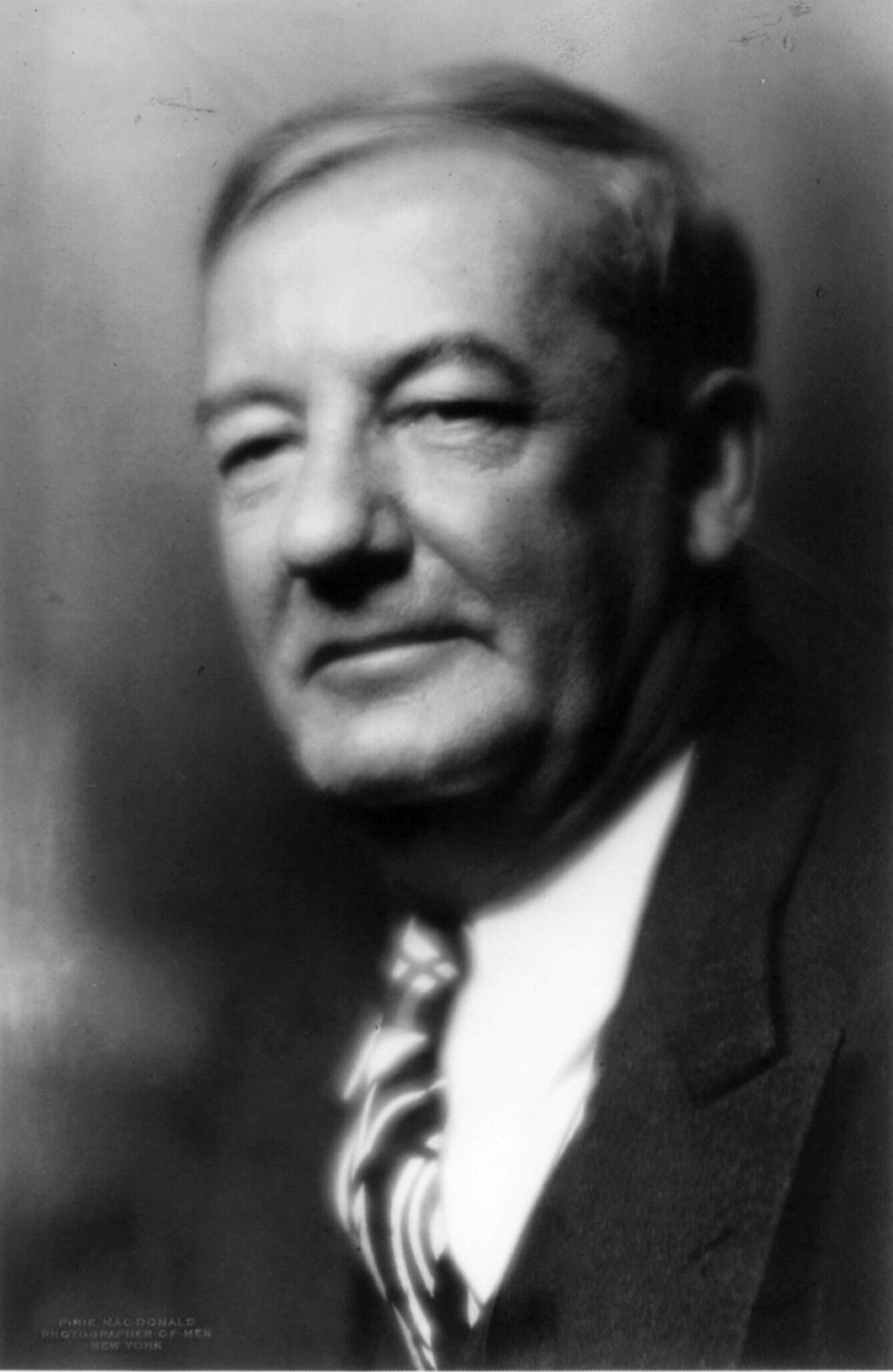
Sherwood Anderson
Playwright

== Honors ==
- New York Rotary Club - Past President
- Photographer's Association of America - Lifetime Member
- Honorary Master of Photography
- Officer of the French Academy - Order of the Palm
- Royal Photographic Society of Great Britain - Honorary Fellow
- Professional Photographers' Society of New York - President 1905 and 1907
- In 1980 Pirie MacDonald was posthumously inducted into the International Photography Hall of Fame and Museum.
