= International Photography Hall of Fame and Museum =

American photography museum

- Established: 1965; 61 years ago
- Location: St. Louis, MO
- Coordinates: 38°38′12.984″N 90°13′43.356″W
- Public transit access: MetroBus
- Website: www.iphf.org

The International Photography Hall of Fame and Museum in St. Louis, Missouri, honors those who have made great contributions to the field of photography.

== History ==
Established in 1965 as the Photographic Art and Science Foundation in Des Plaines Illinois as a 501(c)(3), in 1977 the first public museum and "Hall of Fame" opened in Santa Barbara, California, as a part of the Brooks Institute of Photography. A few years later, in 1983 the museum moved to Oklahoma City and in 2013, moved to its current location, St. Louis, Missouri. The IPHF is the first organization worldwide that recognizes significant contributors to the artistic craft and science of photography.

In addition to an extensive collection of photographs and cameras, IPHF offers lectures and other educational opportunities; surrounding all aspects of photography, past, and present, for people of all ages.

== Hall of Fame inductees ==
The IPHF inductees artists and individuals that have changed the art industry with their photography or inventions. IPHF has more than 70 inductees and archives more than 30,000 images. Each year a nominating committee selects inductees based on their contributions to the art or science of photography and their impact on the history of photography.

(Inductees that were alive at the time of their induction have no date of death following their name.)

=== 1966 Inductees ===
- William Henry Fox Talbot († 1877)

=== 1968 Inductees ===
- George Eastman († 1932)
- Mathew B. Brady († 1896)

=== 1971 Inductees ===
- Alfred Stieglitz († 1946)

=== 1973 Inductees ===
- George W. Harris († 1964)

=== 1974 Inductees ===
- Edward Steichen († 1973)

=== 1976 Inductees ===
- Robert Capa († 1954)

=== 1978 Inductees ===
- Erich Salomon († 1944)

=== 1979 Inductees ===
- Brassaï
- Gertrude Kasebier († 1934)
- Peter Henry Emerson († 1936)

=== 1980 Inductees ===
- Adolf Fassbender
- Pirie MacDonald († 1942)
- Victor Hasselblad († 1978)

=== 1982 Inductees ===
- William Henry Jackson († 1942)

=== 1984 Inductees ===
- Ansel Adams († Apr. 1984)
- Eugene Atget († 1927)
- Oskar Barnack († 1936)
- Bill Brandt († Dec. 1983)
- Imogen Cunningham († 1976)
- Walker Evans († 1975)
- Dorothea Lange († 1965)
- László Moholy-Nagy († 1946)
- Yasuzo Nojima († 1964)
- August Sander († 1964)
- W. Eugene Smith († 1978)
- Paul Strand († 1976)
- James Van Der Zee († 1983)
- Edward Weston († 1958)

=== 1986 Inductees ===
- André Kertész († Sept. 1985)
- Clarence White († 1925)
- Diane Arbus († 1971)
- Josef Sudek († 1976)
- Timothy H. O'Sullivan († 1882)

=== 1989 Inductees ===
- Paul Lindwood Gittings

=== 1991 Inductees ===
- Edwin H. Land († Mar. 1991)

=== 2000 Inductees ===
- Berenice Abbott († 1991)

=== 2001 Inductees ===
- Henri Cartier-Bresson
- Lewis Hine († 1940)

=== 2002 Inductees ===
- Carleton Watkins († 1916)
- Gordon Parks
- Helmut Gernsheim († 1995)

=== 2003 Inductees ===
- Andre Adolphe-Eugene Disderi († 1889)
- Peter Dombrovskis († 1996)

=== 2004 Inductees ===
- Frederick Scott Archer († 1857)
- Robert Frank
- Ruth Bernhard

=== 2005 Inductees ===
- Beaumont Newhall († 1993)
- Harold Edgerton († 1990)
- Manuel Alvarez Bravo († 2002)

=== 2006 Inductees ===
- Arnold Newman († Jun. 2006)
- Richard Avedon († 2004)

=== 2007 Inductees ===
- Roger Fenton († 1869)

=== 2013 Inductees ===
- Yousef Karsh († 2002)

=== 2016 Inductees ===
- Annie Leibovitz
- Ernst Haas († 1986)
- Graham Nash
- John Knoll
- Ken Burns
- Margaret Bourke-White († 1971)
- Sebastiao Salgado
- Steve Jobs († 2011)
- Thomas Knoll
- Willard S. Boyle († 2011)

=== 2017 Inductees ===
- Anne Geddes
- Cindy Sherman
- Edward Curtis († 1952)
- Ernest H. Brooks II
- Harry Benson
- James Nachtwey
- Jerry Uelsmann
- Kenny Rogers - Lifetime Achievement Award
- Ryszard Horowitz
- William Eggleston

=== 2018 Inductees ===
- Joe Rosenthal († 2006)
- Joel Bernstein - Lifetime Achievement Award
- John Sexton
- John Loengard
- Susan Meiselas
- Walter Iooss

=== 2019 Inductees ===
- Bruce Davidson
- Elliott Erwitt
- Julia Margaret Cameron († 1879)
- Mary Ellen Mark († 2015)
- Olivia Parker
- Paul Nicklen
- Ralph Gibson
- Steve McCurry
- Tony Vaccaro

=== 2020 Inductees ===
- Robert Adams
- Lynsey Addario
- Alfred Eisenstaedt († 1995)
- Hiro
- Jay Maisel
- Duane Michals
- Carrie Mae Weems
- Henry Diltz - Lifetime Achievement Award
- Magnum Photos - Leadership Award

=== 2021 Inductees ===
- Dawoud Bey
- Larry Burrows († 1971)
- Philip-Lorca diCorcia
- David Douglas Duncan († 2018)
- Sally Mann
- Pete Souza
- Joyce Tenneson
- Joel Sartore
- Professional Photographers of America - Leadership Award

=== 2022 Inductees ===
- Edward Burtynsky
- Chester Higgins
- Graciela Iturbide
- Helen Levitt († 2009)
- Danny Lyon
- Sarah Moon
- Kyle Huber - Visionary Award
- Association of International Photography Art Dealers (AIPAD) - Leadership Award

=== 2023 Inductees ===
- Nan Goldin
- Vivian Maier († 2009)
- Bea Nettles
- Matika Wilbur - Visionary Award

=== 2024 Inductees ===
- Sam Abell
- Eve Arnold († 2012)
- Paul Caponigro († Nov. 2024)
- Richard Misrach
- Martin Parr
- Anne Wilkes Tucker
- James Balog - Visionary Award

=== 2025 Inductees ===
- David Burnett
- Keith Carter
- Adger Cowans
- Sheila Metzner
- Lee Miller († 1977)
- Stephen Shore
- Zanele Muholi - Visionary Award

=== 2026 Inductees ===
- Lee Friedlander
- Don McCullin
- Sandra Phillips
- Garry Winogrand († 1984)
- Sarah Greenough - Leadership Award
- Fazal Sheikh - Visionary Award
- Joel-Peter Witkin - Visionary Award

== Collection ==
The IPHF collection focuses on photographic works beginning from the 18th century to the present. In addition to photographs, the museum has a large collection of cameras, darkroom, and studio tools dating back to the late 1800s. The entire collection consists of more than 6,000 historical cameras and photography tools and 30,000 photographs. Some of the 19th-century photographic tools include Magic Lanterns, a Praxinoscope Theatre, and an Edison Projecting Kinetoscope.

Within the collection can be found a wide variety of photographic memorabilia from historic manuals on processes and techniques to monographs of notable photographers.

== Exhibitions ==
- 2004: Phil Borges Retrospective
- 2004/05: Alaska Wild
- 2005: Beaumont Newhall – In Plain Sight
- 2005: Harold Edgerton – Stopping Time
- 2005: Manuel Álvarez Bravo – Mestizjae
- 2005: Photography of Hugh Scott, The Oklahoma City National Memorial, 10 Years Remembering
- 2005: James Walden – An Itinerant Eye
- 2005: Arnold Newman – A Life in Photography July–December 2005
- 2017: Nicholas Orzio's Occupied Japan
- 2018: Vivian Maier
- 2019: Oraien Catledge – Cabbagetown
- 2019: 40th Year Anniversary: Nanjing-St. Louis Sister City: Retrospective
- 2019: John Loengard – Moment by Moment
- 2019/20: 2019 Hall of Fame Induction and Awards Exhibition
