= Nicholas Orzio =

American photographer

Nicholas Orzio (White Plains, November 12, 1928 - Rockledge, February 5, 2016) was an American photographer. He is known for his World War II photographs. He was inducted into the International Photography Hall of Fame in 1998.
