= Showa University =

Japanese university

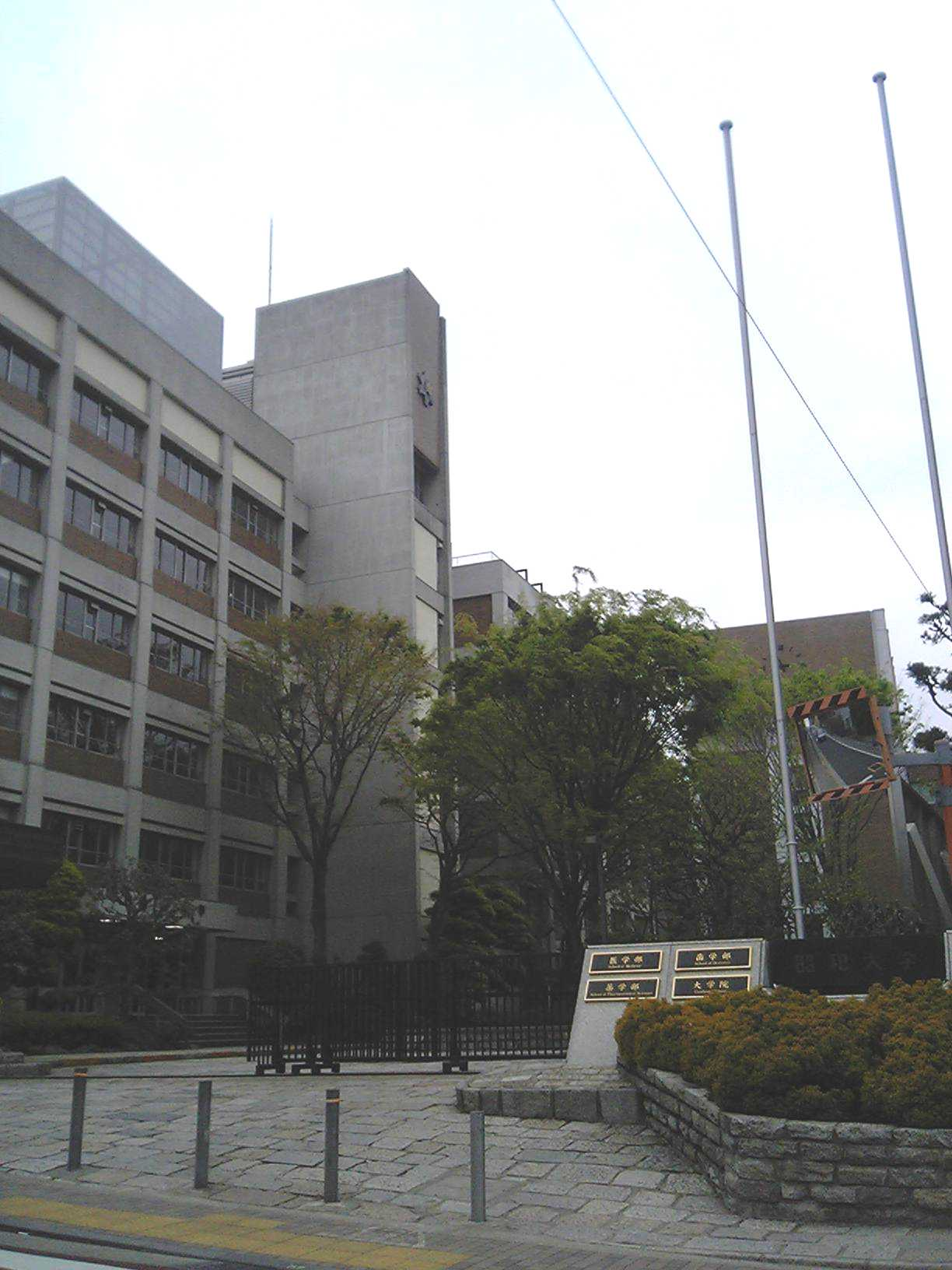
Showa Medical University

Showa University (昭和大学, Shōwa Daigaku) is a private comprehensive medical university in Japan with campuses in Tokyo, Yamanashi and Kanagawa Prefectures. It currently has four schools: medicine, dentistry, pharmacy, and nursing and rehabilitation sciences. What was to become today's Showa University was founded in 1928 as Showa Medical School (昭和医学専門学校, Shōwa Igaku Senmon Gakkō); it was renamed Showa Medical University (昭和医科大学, Shōwa Ika Daigaku) in 1946 before becoming Showa University in 1964 when the School of Pharmacy was established. The School of Dentistry was later established in 1977, followed by the School of Nursing and Rehabilitation Sciences in 2002. It owns 8 hospitals and 1 clinic located throughout Tokyo and Yokohama. Showa University has one of the highest student-to-staff ratio in the world (6th in the world according to Time Higher Education).

Despite similar names, the university has no affiliation with Showa Women's University or Showa Academia Musicae.

== Medical School ==
Showa University School of Medicine is one of the oldest private medical schools in Japan, founded in 1928 as Showa Medical College by Dr. Shunsuke Kamijo. Dr. Kamijo summarized the university's founding ethos in the words of Mencius: Shisei Ikkan (“Constant empathy and sincere devotion toward others”). The main goal of the school is to nurture students with an independent mindset, profound intelligence, and deep compassion for patient care. With eight affiliated hospitals (one of the largest in Japan), the school provides students with diverse clinical experiences throughout their medical education.

One of the unique features of the medical school is that the first-year students spend the entire year at the fully residential campus (Fujiyoshida campus) and study together with students from 3 other departments (Pharmacy, Dentistry, and Nursing and Rehabilitation Sciences).

The Showa University School of Medicine is considered one the top private medical schools among 31 private medical schools in Japan.

== Teaching staff ==
The teaching staff have included:

- Akira Toriyama, ophthalmologist

== Notable alumni ==
Students have included:

- Yukio Hattori, chef
- Katsuya Takasu, plastic surgeon
- Naomi Tokashiki, politician
