= Motoo Ōtaguro =

Japanese music critic (1893–1979)

- 大田黒 元雄
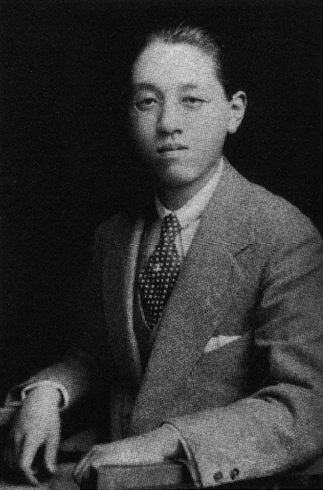
- Motoo Ōtaguro in 1917
- Born: January 11, 1893; Tokyo, Empire of Japan
- Died: January 23, 1979 (aged 86); Shinjuku, Tokyo, Japan
- Occupation: Music critic

Motoo Ōtaguro (大田黒 元雄, Ōtaguro Motoo) (January 11, 1893 – January 23, 1979) was a Japanese music critic. He is considered a pioneer of music criticism in Japan.

== Biography ==
=== Early life ===
Ōtaguro was born in Tokyo, on January 11, 1893. He was born into a wealthy family; his father was Jūgoro Ōtaguro, an entrepreneur influential in the adoption of hydroelectricity in Japan. Ōtaguro had private piano lessons with Hanka Petzold. He graduated from Odawara High School.

=== Career ===
After graduating from high school, Ōtaguro went abroad to study economics at the London School of Economics from 1913 to 1914. He attended many concerts of contemporary music during his time in London. He became acquainted with works by English contemporaries such as Frederick Delius and Ralph Vaughan Williams as well as other European composers such as Claude Debussy and Alexander Scriabin. He went back to Japan in July 1914 for a summer vacation but was unable to return to London due to the outbreak of World War I. Starting his career as a music writer, he published his first two books in 1915. One of these was From Bach to Schoenberg, (Note: Literal translation of Japanese title, Bahha yori Shēnberuhi (バッハよりシェーンベルヒ).) which covered sixty European composers and was the first Japanese book to cover modern composers such as Arnold Schoenberg and Claude Debussy. (Note: Although sometimes credited as introducing Debussy, Ōtaguro was not the first writer in Japan to mention him. Arō Naito wrote an article mentioning him in October 1908, and Kafū Nagai wrote one the following month.)

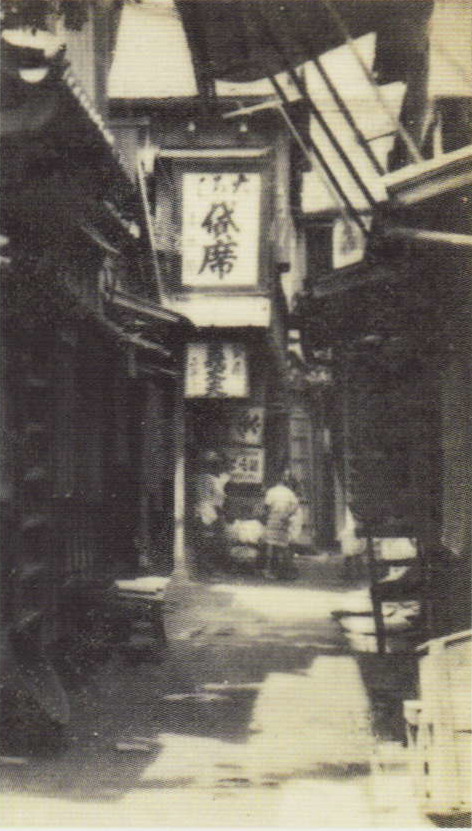
"Dairoji" (Note: Dairoji (大ろじ), literal translation "big alley".) (1921), from Tokyo Old and New

From 1915 to 1917, Ōtaguro held private concerts in his Ōmori-sannō mansion, where he played contemporary pieces on his own piano, despite not being a professional musician. These concerts were held for an audience of about 20 people, including composer Keizō Horiuchi and critic Kōichi Nomura. Despite their small and private audiences, the concerts had programs printed elaborately by Kiyoshi Hasegawa, who lived in Ōmori-sannō at the time. Ōtaguro held a piano concert at the Tokyo YMCA center titled "Scriabin–Debussy Evening" (Note: The advertisement for the concert in the December 1916 issue of Ongaku to Bungaku gives the aforementioned English title, as well as the Japanese title Sukuriabin to Debyusshii no yū (スクリアビンとデビュッシイの夕).) on December 9, 1916. This was the first concert in Japan dedicated to either of the composers' music. (Note: There were five other performances of Debussy's music in Tokyo before, the first one being a performance of Sarabande from Pour le piano by Rudolph Ernest Reuter on November 24, 1909. However, Ōtaguro's concert was the first one with a program heavily featuring Debussy's music.)

In 1916, Ōtaguro started the publishing company Ongaku to Bungakusha. It published books and a magazine titled Ongaku to Bungaku, (Note: The title of the magazine translates to Music and Literature.) which ran until 1919. He revised and compiled essays he wrote for the magazine into multiple books. By 1921, the company ceased its activities. Ōtaguro went on to publish books for Daiichi Shobō in 1925, who also reprinted works published by Ongaku to Bungakusha.

He was a founding member of the photography group Photographic Art Society (Note: Shashin geijutsusha (写真芸術社); in the orthography of the time, 寫眞藝術社), which was active from 1921 to 1924. Other members of the group included Shinzō and Rosō Fukuhara. The society was affiliated with a magazine, Shashin geijutsu, published from June 1921 until September 1923; Ōtaguro contributed an article, "Shashin shoron" (写真小論), to its first issue. His photography career was short lived, and he did not get much recognition as a photographer.

After World War II, he made appearances on the NHK radio quiz show Hanashi no Izumi.

Ōtaguro was recognized as a Person of Cultural Merit, one of Japan's highest honors, in 1977.

=== Death ===
Ōtaguro died at 86 from cholangiocarcinoma at the Tokyo Welfare Pension Hospital (now JCHO Tokyo Shinjuku Medical Center) on January 23, 1979. He was hospitalized since September the preceding year. He is buried at Somei Cemetery.

Parts of his residence in Suginami, where he lived since 1933, were transformed into an urban park called Ōtaguro Park, which opened on October 1, 1981.

Ōtaguro's personal collection of books, sheet music, and other material was donated to the NHK by his daughter. The collection was transferred to the Documentation Center of Modern Japanese Music on September 24, 1998. In July 2010, the entire collection of the Documentation Center was transferred to the Meiji Gakuin University's Archives of Modern Japanese Music.

== Writings ==
=== Translations ===
In addition to his own writing, Ōtaguro translated many books on music, starting in 1919 with Music on Water (Note: Literal translation of Japanese title, Mizu no ue no ongaku (水の上の音楽)), a collection of translated essays by various writers.

Ōtaguro's translated works by several English and French composers, as well as historical biographies about composers. Biographies translated by him included works such as André Pirro's biography about Johann Sebastian Bach, which was the first biographic book about Bach published in Japan, and Marie Bobillier's (Note: Published under her pseudonym Michel Brenet.) biography of Joseph Haydn.

=== Poetry ===
Ōtaguro published a few books of his own poetry, including Haru no enbu, (Note: Haru no enbu: Shishū (春の円舞 詩集), literal translation Waltz of Spring: Poetry Collection.) and Nichirin. (Note: Nichirin: Shishū (日輪 詩集), literal translation Sunflower: Poetry Collection.) He also published poetry in the magazine Kamen. (Note: Kamen (仮面); in the orthography of the time, 假面, literal translation Mask.)

Ōtaguro wrote the lyrics for Dan Ikuma's song cycle Tōkyō shōkei. (Note: Tōkyō shōkei (東京小景), literal translation Small Landscapes in Tokyo.)

== Personal life ==
Ōtaguro married his wife, Chizue Hirota, in 1919.

Ōtaguro's other keen interests included baseball, sumō, detective stories, and poetry.

== Bibliography ==
Titles have been modified to use shinjitai kanji. Katakana transliterations of names are unmodified and reflect the original publication. (Note: For example, Ōtaguro wrote Schoenberg as Shēnberuhi (シェーンベルヒ), but modern writing uses Shēnberuku (シェーンベルク).)

=== As author ===
- 1915, Bach to Schoenberg (バッハよりシェーンベルヒ, Bahha yori Shēnberuhi)
- 1915, Gendai eikoku gekisakka: hyōron ken shōkai (現代英国劇作家 評論兼紹介)
- 1916, Inshō to kansō (印象と感想)
- 1916, Kindai ongaku seizui (近代音楽精髄)
- 1917, Gion no kyaku: Daiichi kashū (祇園の客 第一歌集)
- 1917, Haru no enbu: Shishū (春の円舞 詩集)
- 1917, Kageki taikan (歌劇大観)
- 1917, Nichirin: Shishū (日輪 詩集)
- 1917, Roshia buyō (露西亜舞踊)
- 1917, Tōkyō shōkei: Daini kashū (東京小景 第二歌集)
- 1917, Yōgaku yawa (洋楽夜話)
- 1917, Zoku yōgaku yawa (続洋楽夜話)
- 1918, Zoku Bahha yori Shēnberuhi (続バッハよりシェーンベルヒ)
- 1919, Ongaku nikki shō (音楽日記抄)
- 1919, Daini ongaku nikki shō (第二音楽日記抄)
- 1920, Daisan ongaku nikki shō (第三音楽日記抄)
- 1920, Debyusshii igo: Ongaku ronshū (デビュッシイ以後 音楽論集)
- 1920, Kagee (影絵)
- 1920, Meikyoku taikan (名曲大観)
- 1920, Takujō gakuwa (卓上楽話)
- 1925, Hanayakanaru kaisō (華やかなる回想)
- 1926, Ongaku no yokogao: Ongaku zuihitsu senshū (音楽の横顔 音楽随筆選集)
- 1932, Debussy (ドビュツシイ, Dobyusshii)
- 1932, Taiseiyō sonohoka (大西洋そのほか)
- 1933, Kageki (歌劇)
- 1933, Ongaku mangekyō (音楽万華鏡)
- 1933, Ongaku no shūi: Esseishū (音楽の周囲 エッセイ集)
- 1933, Kimyōna sonzai (奇妙な存在)
- 1934, Zuihitsushū kirakuna sanpo (随筆集 気楽な散歩)
- 1935, Ongaku seikatsu 20-nen (音楽生活二十年)
- 1935, Wagner (ワアグナア, Wāgunā)
- 1937, Kyūjitsu no sho (休日の書)
- 1940, Ongaku sonohoka (音楽そのほか)
- 1950, Ongaku no mado (音楽の窓)
- 1951, Dobyusshii hyōden (ドビュツシイ評伝)
- 1958, Oshare shinshi (おしゃれ紳士)
- 1962, Kageki daijiten (歌劇大事典)
- 1970, Haikara shinshi banashi (はいから紳士譚)

=== As translator ===
- 1919, Mizu no ue no ongaku (水の上の音楽) (collection of translated essays by Gerald Cumberland, Francis Grierson, Cyril Scott, Lawrence Gilman and Carl Van Vechten, also including two of Ōtaguro's essays)
- 1920, Gerald Cumberland: Set Down in Malice: A Book of Reminiscences (Bishō to chōshō (微笑と嘲笑))
- 1920, Petrushka (ペトルーシュカ, Petorūshuka)
- 1925, Adam Carse: The History of Orchestration (Kangengaku oyobi kangengakuhō no rekishiteki kenkyū (管絃楽及び管絃楽法の歴史的研究))
- 1926, Cyril Scott: The Philosophy of Modernism, in its Connection with Music (Ongaku ni kanrenseru kindai shugi no tetsugaku (音楽に関聯せる近代主義の哲学)
- 1926, Romain Rolland: Kinsei ongaku no reimei (近世音楽の黎明)
- 1928, Romain Rolland: Sugishi hi no ongakuka (過ぎし日の音楽家)
- 1928, Jean Cocteau: Le Coq et l'Arlequin (Ondori to arurukan (雄鳥とアルルカン))
- 1930, Cecil Gray: The History of Music (Ongaku geijutsushi (音楽芸術史))
- 1930, Romain Rolland: Konnichi no ongakuka (今日の音楽家)
- 1930, Cecil Gray: Survey of Contemporary Music (現代音楽概観 (Gendai ongaku gaikan))
- 1931, Paul Bekker: Beethoven (Beetōven (ベエトオヴェン))
- 1931, Claude Debussy: Monsieur Croche, antidilettante (ムッシュウ・クロッシュ・アンティディレッタント 音楽評論集 (Musshū kurosshu antidirettanto: Ongaku hyōronshū))
- 1931, Claude Debussy: Ongakuron (音樂論)
- 1931, André Pirro: Jean-Sébastien Bach (Bahha (バッハ))
- 1932, Michel Brenet: Haydn (Haidon (ハイドン))
- 1933, Arthur Schurig: Mozart (Mootsuaruto (モオツアルト)
- 1936, Igor Stravinsky: Chronicle of My Life (Sutoravinsukii jiden (ストラヴィンスキイ自伝))
- 1937, Constant Lambert: Music Ho! A Study of Music in Decline (Gendai ongakuron (現代音楽論))
- 1938, Michel-Dimitri Calvocoressi: Kindai ongaku kaisōroku (近代音楽回想録)
- 1938, George Dyson: Ongaku bunkashi (音楽文化史)
- 1939, William Murdoch: Chopin: His Life (Shopan hyōden (ショパン評伝))
- 1940, Felix Weingartner: Lebenserinnerungen (闘争の一生 ワインガルトナア自傳 (Tōsō no isshō: Waingarutonaa jiden))
- 1942, Cecil Gray: Predicaments: Or Music and the Future (Ongaku no genzai oyobi shōrai (音楽の現在及び将来))
