= Hideo Mōri =

Japanese biologist

- 毛利秀雄
- Born: 6 June 1930 (age 96)
- Citizenship: Japan
- Education: University of Tokyo
- Employer(s): University of Tokyo; National Institute for Basic Biology
- Relatives: Baron Gorō Mōri (grandfather) Duke Motonori Mōri (great-grandfather); Marquess Yoshichika Tokugawa (great-grand uncle) Viscount Yoshitami Matsudaira (great-grand uncle)
- Family: Mōri clan
- Website: https://www.nibb.ac.jp/sections/nibb_emeritus_prof/emeritus_prof/detail/mohri.html

Hideo Mōri (毛利秀雄, Mōri Hideo) (also spelt as Hideo Mohri; born 6 June 1930) is a Japanese biologist. He is best known for the discovery of tubulin.

== Life ==
He was born on 6 June 1930. He is the great-grandson of Duke Sadahiro Mōri, the 28th head of the Mōri clan. He is also related to the Tokugawa clan through his grandmother Masako, who was a sister of Marquess Yoshichika Tokugawa, the botanist. His maternal grandmother, Ariko, was the daughter of the founder of Shiseido, Arinobu Fukuhara, and through him, he is related to the Nobel laureate in Chemistry, Ryoji Noyori.

He graduated from the University of Tokyo's Faculty of Science, Department of Zoology in 1953. His specialisation was in reproductive biology and animal physiological chemistry. He continued research on sperm at the graduate school of his alma mater and the university's Misaki Marine Biological Centre from 1968 to 1990. He elucidated the constituent proteins of the sperm flagellum's structural body (cytoskeleton). In 1968, he determined the amino acid composition of the microtubule's constituent proteins and named it tubulin. From 1987 to 1989, he served as Dean of the College of Arts and Sciences. In 1991, he retired from the University of Tokyo and was conferred the title of professor emeritus.
