= Japan Pharmaceutical Association =

- 日本薬剤師会
- Abbreviation: JPA
- Formation: June 11, 1893; 133 years ago
- Founder: Ogimachi Sanemasa
- Type: professional association
- Purpose: representing pharmacists
- Headquarters: Shinjuku, Tokyo
- Members: 103 850
- Chairman: Nobuo Yamamoto
- Website: www.nichiyaku.or.jp

The Japan Pharmaceutical Association (日本薬剤師会, Nihon yakuzai shikai) is the peak national professional association representing pharmacists in Japan. Pharmacists who join their prefectural and local municipality professional organisations automatically gain membership in the JPA. The association was founded on June 11, 1893 by Ogimachi Sanemasa.

== History ==
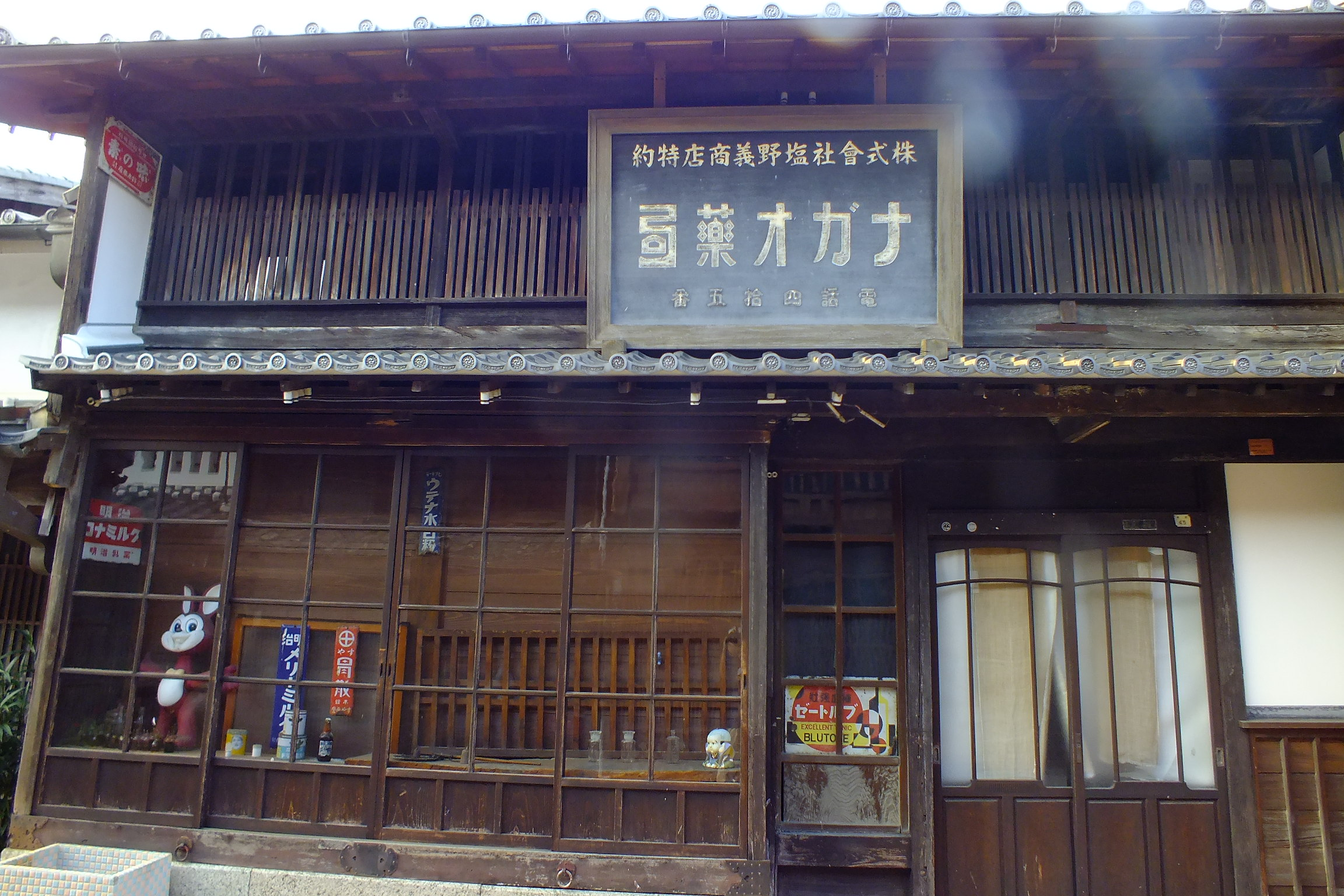
An Edo period pharmacy in Seki-juku (Tōkaidō) along the 53 Stations of the Tōkaidō

In 1874 government announced the development of a modern medical system and grants medication dispensing to pharmacists. The government then announced statutory regulations and guidelines for the handling of chemicals in the pharmaceutical industry, and the professional title Pharmacist was designated.

There had been an increasing introduction of Western medicine in Japan since the Meiji restoration in 1868, and a failed attempt by medical practitioners of traditional Kampo (Chinese medicine) in 1890, led to the rise of Western style pharmacy practice.

The first Western compounding pharmacy was opened in Japan in 1872 by Arinobu Fukuhara operating under the name Shiseidō. 1893 Japan Pharmaceutical Association was established as the sole national professional association for pharmacists.

In 1909, The Japan Pharmaceutical Association was legally incorporated as a public interest corporation.

In 1926, statutory obligations were set in place requiring pharmacists to join the association through membership at the prefectural and local municipality level, which began the process of establishing local pharmaceutical associations. The legal process undertaken by the Imperial government was similar to the establishment of the Japan Medical Association.

The New Pharmaceutical Act of 1943 brought the Japan Pharmaceutical Association under the direct control of the Imperial government. The JPA national president and the controlling members of local pharmaceutical associations were appointed by the Minister for Health.

Following the end of World War II, the JPA was amalgamated with the Pharmaceutical Society of Japan (日本薬学会, Nihon yakugaku Kai) in 1948 and membership became voluntary. (Note: The JPA changed its name to the 日本薬剤師協会 (Nihon yakuzaishi kyoukai) in 1948 and back to the 日本薬剤師会 (Nihon yakuzaishi Kai) in 1962, however the English translation remained unchanged, i.e. The Japan Pharmaceutical Association)

In 1949 the American Pharmaceutical Association visited Japan and recommendations for the reform of the medical pharmaceutical industry were implemented including changes to law and education of pharmacists.

In 1962 the Pharmaceutical Society of Japan broke away from the JPA and was incorporated as a separate organisation. (Note: The JPA changed its name to the 日本薬剤師協会 (Nihon yakuzaishi kyoukai) in 1948 and back to the 日本薬剤師会 (Nihon yakuzaishi Kai) in 1962, however the English translation remained unchanged, i.e. The Japan Pharmaceutical Association)

In 2011, an emergency team of 2062 pharmacists were deployed in response to the 2011 Tōhoku earthquake and tsunami, to ensure that essential medications were supplied to those displaced by the event, and maintain continuity of care.

== Membership types and employment ==
There are four membership types:

- The supporting member class is open to individuals who are not practicing pharmacists, but who endorse and support the operations of the association.
- The regular member class is open to pharmacists who endorse and support the operations of the association.
- The special member class is open to individuals who are studying pharmacy, or have knowledge and experience related to pharmacy, and who endorse and support the operations of the association.
- The honorary member class is open to individuals who have been elected by the board of directors, and who have made significant contributions to achieving the purposes of the association.

Most JPA members are employed in community pharmacies or pharmacies attached to clinics and hospitals.

JPA member employment category as at 2017.
1. Community pharmacy (76.9%)
2. Hospital or clinic (10.1%)
3. Retail sales (1.00%)
4. Wholesale (2.20%)
5. Administration (1.50%)
6. Manufacturer (0.80%)
7. Education and research (0.70%)
8. Other (6.80%)

The involvement of pharmacists in promoting safe self-medicating practices in an aging population, is anticipated as being an important change in pharmacy practice. This has led to the introduction of pharmacist professional development programs, to equip pharmacists by 2025, with the capacity to engage in a team based allied community health approach to pharmacist practice.

== Notable members ==
Satoshi Ōmura 2015 Nobel laureate known for his contribution to the development of the drug Ivermectin a WHO listed essential medicine for the treatment of parasites.

Arinobu Fukuhara was Chief Pharmacist of the Imperial Japanese Navy, the founder of the pharmaceutical and cosmetic company Shiseidō, and served a small president of the JPA.

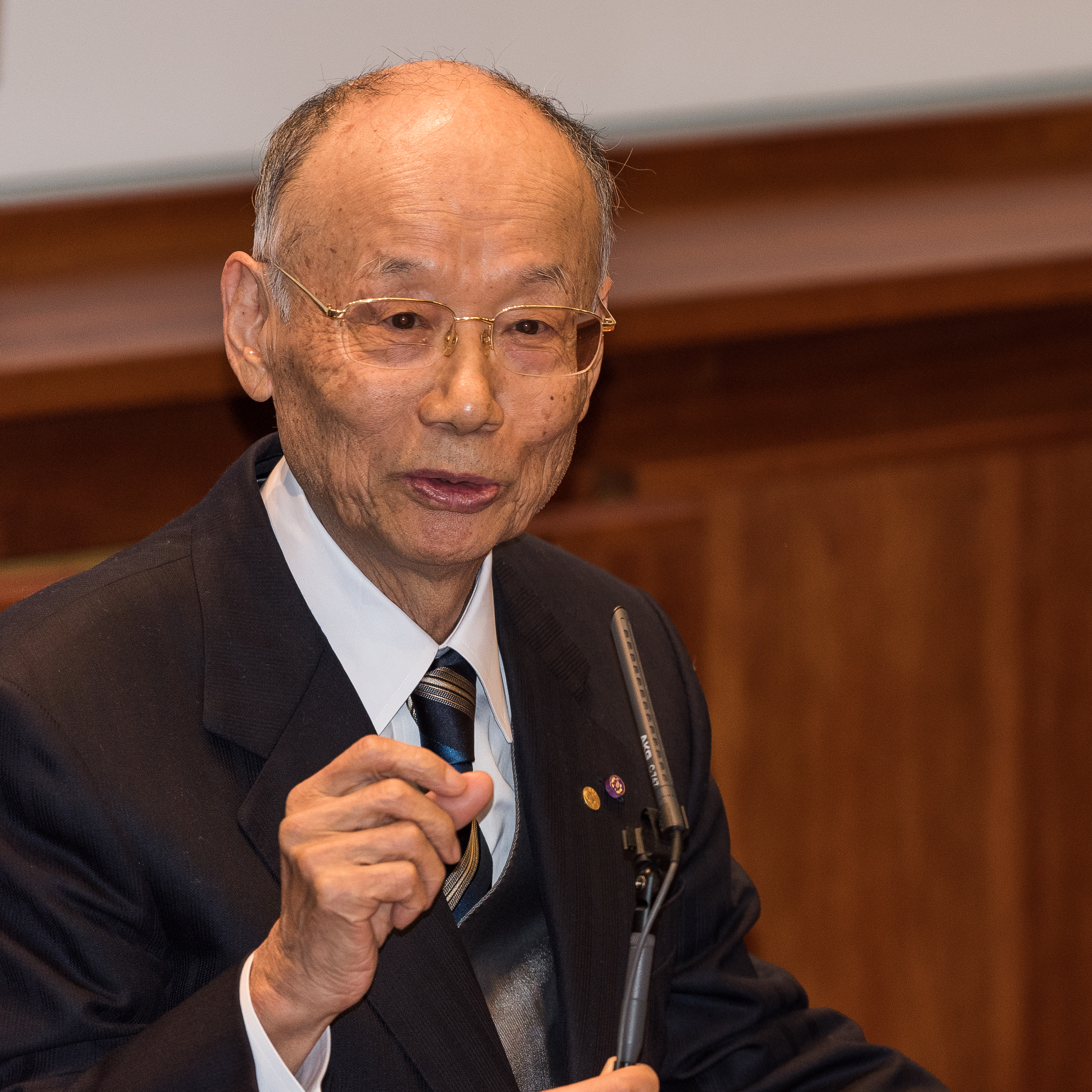
Professor Satoshi Ömura, recipient of the 2015 Nobel prize

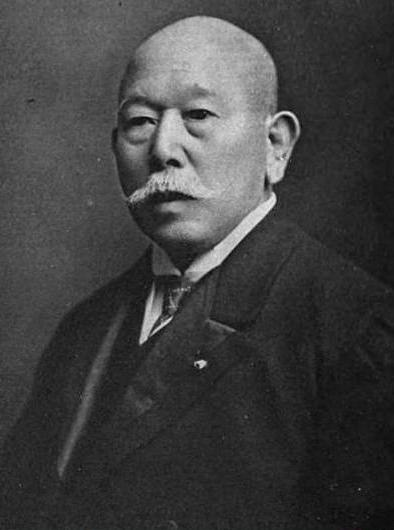
Arinobu Fukuhara, the founder of Shiseidō, served as the 3rd president of the JPA

== See also ==
- Japan Medical Association
- List of Japanese Nobel laureates
- Shiseidō
- Nihon Yakushi Gakkai (The Japan Society for the History of Pharmacy)
