= Yasuzō Nojima =

Japanese photographer

Yasuzō Nojima (野島 康三, Nojima Yasuzō; 1889-1964) was a Japanese photographer. He is particularly well known for his unidealized nudes of "ordinary" Japanese women executed in both pictorialist and modernist styles. His work ranged from kaiga shugi shashin (pictorial photography) to Shinkō shashin (new/straight photography) in the early twentieth century.

== Early life ==
Nojima began studying at Keio University in 1906, and began taking photographs two years later.

== Photographic career ==
From 1915 to 1920 he ran a gallery, the Misaka Photo Shop, where he had his first solo exhibition in 1920. Around that same time he opened the Kabutoya Gado gallery, which was connected to the shirakaba-ha literary movement. Nojima later operated several other studios, such as the Nonomiya Photography Studio, and Nojima Tei, which was a salon based in his house.

He became a member of the Japan Photographic Society in 1928.

In 1984 Nojima was posthumously inducted into the International Photography Hall of Fame and Museum.
