= Arinobu Fukuhara =

Japanese businessman

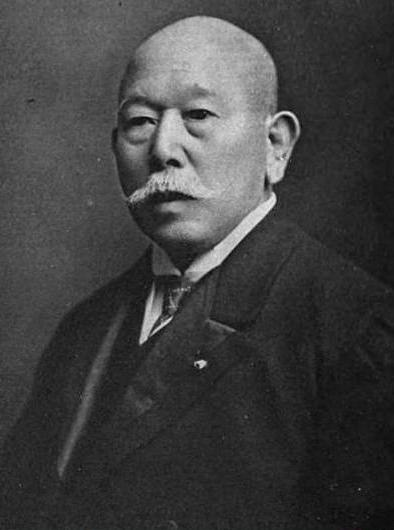
- Born: Fukuhara Arinobu; May 10, 1848; Awa, Chiba-Ken, Japan
- Died: March 30, 1924 (aged 75)
- Occupation(s): Business tycoon, pharmacist, cosmetician
- Known for: Founder of Shiseido Company Ltd., as Apothecary Shiseido; Chief Pharmacist of Imperial Japanese Navy; Arinobu Fukuhara House
- Family: Fukuhara Nbuyushi (son), Shinzo Fukuhara (son), Yoshiharu Fukuhara (grandson), Hideo Mōri (great grandson)

Arinobu Fukuhara (福原 有信, Fukuhara Arinobu; May 10, 1848 – March 30, 1924) was a Japanese business tycoon and pharmacist and cosmetician, who was the head of Apothecary Shiseidō (which in 1927 would be incorporated as Shiseidō Company, Ltd.) and Toku Fukuhara (福原 とく, Fukuhara Toku).

Arinobu Fukuhara is known internationally because of the Arinobu Fukuhara House at Hakone, which Frank Lloyd Wright designed in 1918 as a Prairie-style vacation villa for the extended Fukuhara family.

Born in Awa, Chiba-ken, he rose to become Chief Pharmacist of the Imperial Japanese Navy. In retirement, he embarked on a second career which would bring fame and fortune. He was also president of the Aikoko Insurance Company.

== Family patriarch ==
Arinobu was the father of photographers Rosō Fukuhara (福原 路草, Fukuhara Rosō; 1892–1946), Shinzō Fukuhara (福原 信三, Fukuhara Shinzō; 1883–1948) and Nobuyushi Fukuhara (福原 信義, Fukuhara Nobuyushi; 1897–1958), who would gain fame as Tōru Namiki (並木 透, Namiki Tōru). His sons became quintessential mobo, or "modern boys"—the sobriquet coined to describe the young, sophisticated, up-to-date young men who frequented the fashionable Ginza district in the late 1920s—and they shared a fascination and persistent attraction to photography as an art form. The Fukuharas helped to bring photography into the mainstream of Japanese modernism. The two brothers were founding organizers of the Japan Photographic Society (日本写真会, Nihon Shashinkai) in 1924; and Shinzō was its first president. The organization was a major pre-war influence on Japanese photography and still exists today despite a temporary dissolution during the years of the Pacific War.

His grandson, olympic alpine skier, Yoshiharu Fukuhara (福原義春, Fukuhara Yoshiharu; 1931–) continues this family tradition of fostering the development of Japanese photography. He has been director of the Tokyo Metropolitan Museum of Photography since his appointment by Tokyo Governor Shintarō Ishihara in 2000.

== Shiseido ==
Beauty is universal, thus the products which serve beauty should also be universal.

— Yushin Fukuhara, company founder

As Shiseido has grown to become an international cosmetics giant, the company has managed to avoid some of the pitfalls and problems which have attended generational transitions in other successful family businesses. For example, Arinobu's grandson, Yoshiharu Fukuhara, joined Shiseido immediately after receiving his B.A. in economics from Keio University, Tokyo, in 1953. He was appointed president and CEO of Shiseido in 1987, then chairman of the board in 1997 and honorary chairman in 2001.

Three Fukuhara leaders in the Shiseido hierarchy were:

- 1st president: Fukuhara, Shinzo—son of company founder
- 2nd president: Fukuhara, Nobuyoshi—younger brother of company's 1st president
- 3rd president: Fukuhana, Yoshibaru—son of company's 2nd president

== Japan Pharmaceutical Association ==
Arinobu served as the third president of the Japan Pharmaceutical Association (日本薬剤師会, Nippon Yakuzaishi Kai), 1907–1909. During his administration, JPA applied for and obtained approval from the Japanese government to become what was known as a "corporate juridical person" (public corporation).

== Arinobu Fukuhara House ==
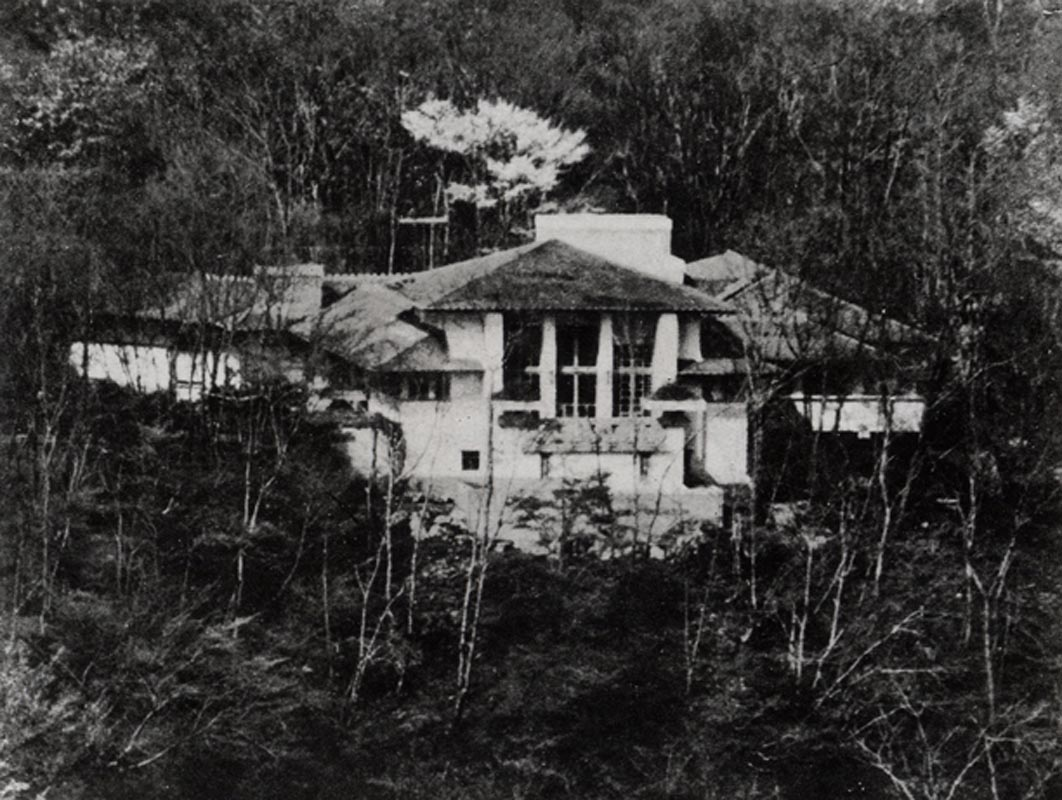
Full view of the Arinobu Fukuhara House

The commissioned house was designed and built in 1920, but the site near a hot spring left the building vulnerable to the cataclysmic 1923 Great Kantō earthquake which collapsed it.
