= Giuliano Bugialli =

Italian food writer and historian

Giuliano Bugialli (January 7, 1931 – July 6, 2019) was an Italian food writer and historian who researched old recipes and published several cookbooks on Italian cooking.

== Biography ==
He studied business at the Università degli Studi di Firenze and languages at a university in Rome, where he became a teacher in Italian for college students from the USA.

He created a cooking school in his home town Florence in 1972, before moving to the US to teach Italian language at Dalton School in New York City. He also established cooking schools on Manhattan and appeared on television shows. In his home country he had a series of weekly cooking shows on RAI (national TV) and in the US he hosted the 26 episode Bugialli's Italy on PBS.

He was born in Florence in 1931, son of a winemaker and a typist. His companion was US composer Henry Weinberg (1931–2017). He died in Viareggio on July 6, 2019.

== Publications ==
- The fine art of Italian cooking, Times books, 1977
- Classic Techniques of Italian Cooking, 1982
- Foods of Italy, with John Dominis, 1984
- Bugialli on Pasta, 1988
- Bugialli's Foods of Tuscany, Stewart, Tabori & Chang, 1992
- Bugialli's Italy: Traditional Recipes From The Regions Of Italy, 1994
- Best of Bugialli, Stewart, Tabori & Chang, 1994
- Foods of Sicily and Sardinia and the Smaller Islands, with John Dominis, Rizzoli, 1996
- Guiliano Bugialli's Food of Naples and Campania, 2003
- Parma. A Capital of Italian Gastronomy, 2005

== Awards ==
- Catherine de' Medici award, 1980
- James Beard Foundation awards
  - Winner, International 1983.
  - Winner, International 1985.
  - Winner, Who's Who of Food & Beverage in America 1986.
- 2005 Fiorino d'Oro.
