= Ōtaguro Park =

Park in Suginami, Tokyo

- 大田黒公園
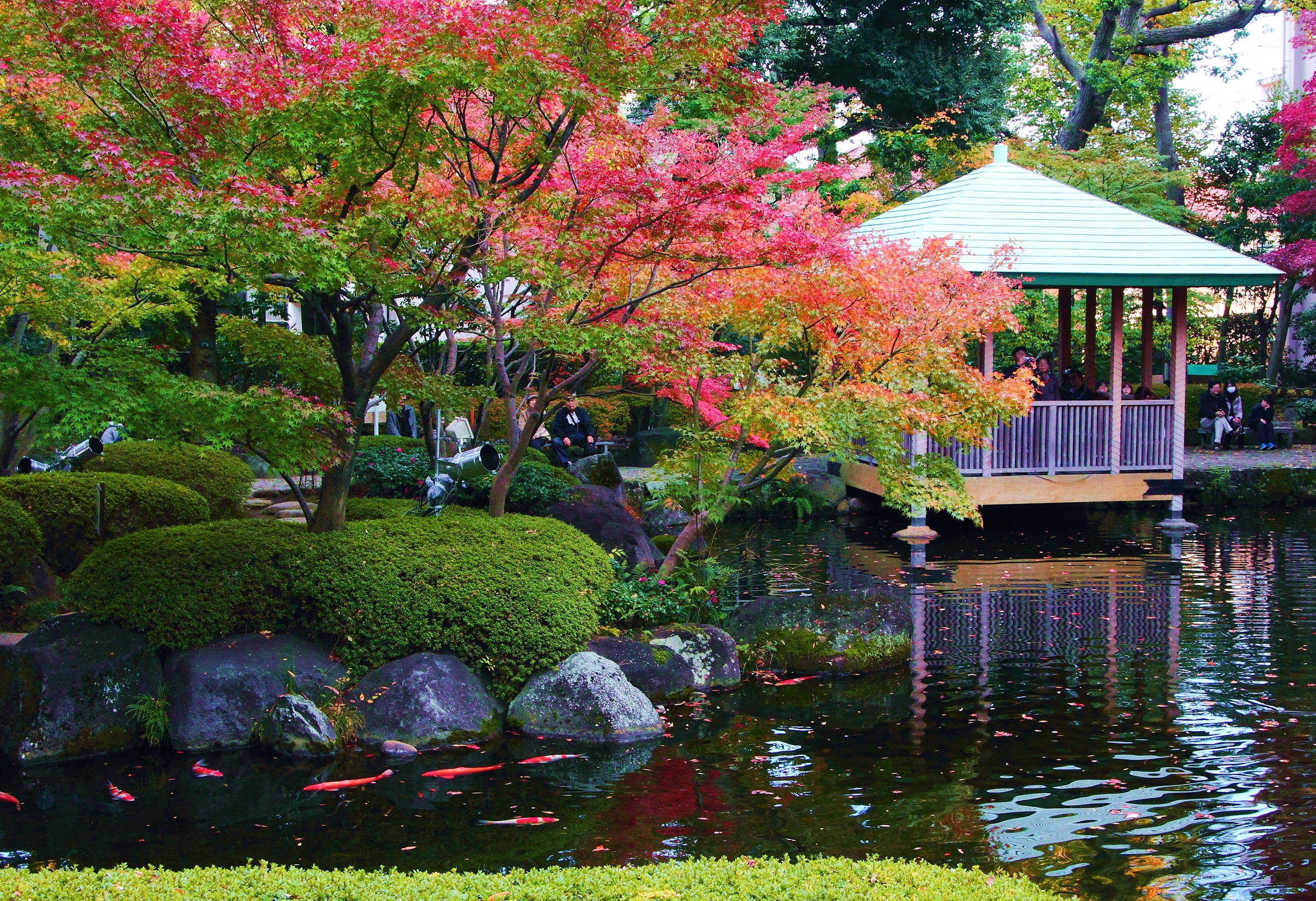
- A pond in the park
- Interactive map of Ōtaguro Park
- Type: Urban park
- Location: Suginami, Tokyo, Japan
- Coordinates: 35°42′2.3″N 139°37′29.1″E
- Opened: October 1, 1981

Ōtaguro Park (大田黒公園, Ōtaguro Kōen) is an urban park in Suginami, Tokyo. It opened on October 1, 1981, and was created from the residence of music critic Motoo Ōtaguro, where he lived from 1933 until his death in 1979.

Ōtaguro's piano, a 1900 Steinway & Sons, is preserved in a building in the park.
