= John Loengard =

American photojournalist (1934–2020)

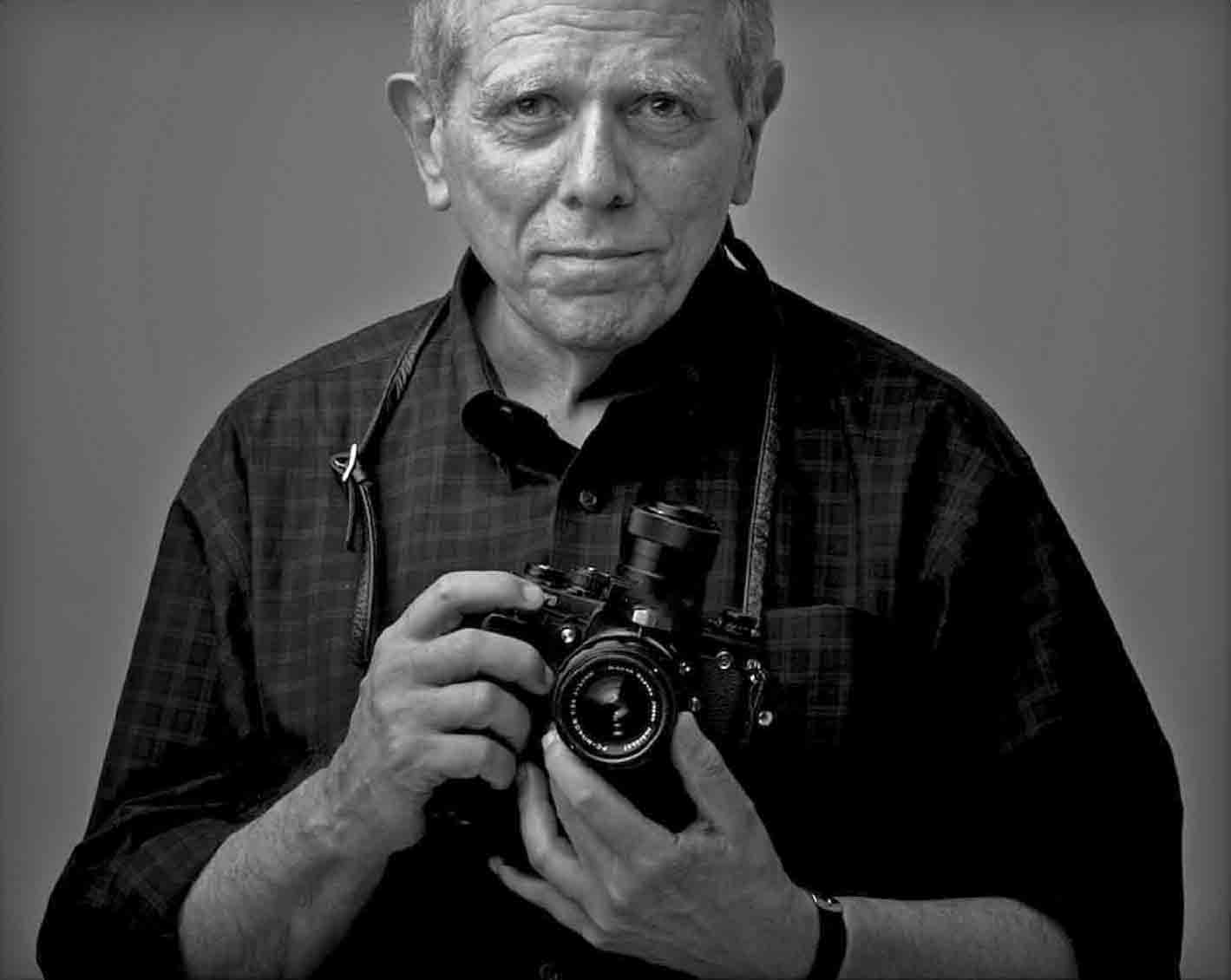
- Loengard in 2010
- Born: September 5, 1934; Manhattan, New York City, US
- Died: May 24, 2020 (aged 85); Manhattan, New York City, US
- Known for: Photography
- Website: johnloengard.com

John Borg Loengard (September 5, 1934 – May 24, 2020) was an American photographer who worked at Life magazine from 1961, and was its picture editor from 1973 to 1987. He taught at the International Center of Photography, New York, The New School for Social Research, New York, and at workshops around the country.

== Early life ==
Born in New York City in 1934, Loengard became interested in photography at the age of eleven, when, at the end of World War II, his father spoke of buying a new camera. Loengard began to take pictures for his high school newspaper. In 1956, when he was a senior at Harvard College, Life magazine asked him to photograph a freighter run aground on Cape Cod—an assignment that began Loengard's long association with the publication. Of his heroes, Henri Cartier-Bresson, W. Eugene Smith, and Robert Frank, Loengard wrote: "They mixed their feelings with reportage in strong new ways. It was my plan to do so, too."

== Career ==
He joined the staff of Life magazine in 1961. When Life suspended weekly publication in 1972, Loengard became the picture editor of ten semi-annual Life "Special Reports". He was the picture editor of Time Inc.'s Magazine Development Group, planning and launching People magazine in 1974. He was instrumental, in 1978, in Life's rebirth as a monthly. In 1986, that publication won the first award for "Excellence in Photography" ever given by the American Society of Magazine Editors. Loengard continued as Life's picture editor until 1987. He was the author of ten books on photography.

He taught at the International Center of Photography, New York, The New School for Social Research, New York, and at workshops around the country.

In 2004, Loengard was given the Henry R. Luce "Lifetime Achievement Award" from Time Inc. In 2005, American Photo magazine identified Loengard as "One of the 100 most influential people in photography". "Photographer and picture editor, mentor and oracle, curator and historian, critic and scholar—over the years, John Loengard has assumed all of these roles," wrote Vanity Fair magazine, "with élan and focus, obstinacy and whip-smart intelligence."

He was inducted into the International Photography Hall of Fame in 2018.

== Death ==
He died of heart failure on May 24, 2020, in Manhattan, New York, at the age of 85.

== Publications ==
- Pictures Under Discussion (New York: Amphoto, 1987), ISBN 0-8174-5539-6. Photographs by Loengard.
- Life Classic Photographs: A Personal Interpretation by John Loengard (Boston: Little, Brown and Company, 1988), ISBN 0-8212-1714-3. Loengard's selection and commentary.
- Life Faces, with Commentary by John Loengard (New York: Macmillan, 1991), ISBN 0-02-574043-1. Loengard's selection and commentary.
- Celebrating the Negative (New York: Arcade Publishing, Inc., 1994), ISBN 1-55970-282-6.
- Georgia O'Keeffe at Ghost Ranch (Munich: Schirmer / Mosel, 1995), ISBN 3-88814-745-X; (New York: Stewart, Tabori & Chang, 1995), ISBN 1-55670-423-2; (New York: Te Neues, 1998), ISBN 3-8238-9965-1
- Life Classic Photographs: A Personal Interpretation by John Loengard, Updated With New Photographs (Boston: Little, Brown and Company, 1996), ISBN 0-8212-2263-5
- Life Photographers: What They Saw (New York: Bullfinch, 1998), ISBN 0-8212-2518-9. Interviews by Loengard with 44 photographers who were on the staff of Life between 1936 and 1972.
- The Great Life Photographers (New York: Bulfinch, 1988), ISBN 978-0-8212-2892-0. Loengard conceived the book, was the contributing editor and wrote the introduction.
- As I See It (New York: Vendome, 2005), ISBN 086565-167-1; (London: Thames & Hudson, 2005), ISBN 0-500-54307-0; Monografie John Loengard (Paris: Éditions de La Martininiere, 2005), ISBN 2-7324-3368-3. A retrospective of Loengard's photographs.
- Georgia O'Keeffe / John Loengard Paintings & Photographs (Munich: Schirmer / Mosel, 2006), ISBN 3-8296-0103-4, ISBN 978-3-8296-0103-0; Image and Imagination, Georgia O'Keeffe by John Loengard (San Francisco: Chronicle, 2007), ISBN 0-8118-6132-5, Georgia O'Keeffe / John Loengard Paintings & Photographs (Munich: Schirmer / Mosel, 2016), ISBN 978-3-8296-0786-5. Photographs by Loengard and paintings by O'Keeffe. With an introduction by Loengard.
- Age of Silver: Encounters with Great Photographers (Brooklyn: powerHouse, 2011), ISBN 978-1-57687-587-2. Loengard's portraits of photographers.
- Moment By Moment (New York: Thames & Hudson, 2016), ISBN 978-0-500-97077-5. Photographs By Loengard/

== Exhibitions ==
- International Center of Photography, New York City, 1987
- Saidye Bronfman Center, Montreal, Quebec, 1996
- University of Kentucky Art Museum, Lexington, KY, 2007
- The Century Association, New York City, 2009
- George Eastman House, Rochester, NY, 2010
- Henry Fox Talbot Museum, Lacock Abbey, England, 2010
- Celebrating the Negative (traveling exhibition), 2013
- International Photography Hall of Fame, St. Louis, MO, 2019

== Collections ==
Loengard's work is held in the following permanent collections:

- National Portrait Gallery, Washington, D.C.
- Center for Creative Photography, Tucson, Arizona
- International Center of Photography, New York
- Menil Foundation, Houston, Texas
- George Eastman House, Rochester, New York
- International Photography Hall of Fame, St. Louis, Missouri
