= Jiichirō Yasukōchi =

Japanese photographer

Jiichirō Yasukōchi (安河内治一郎, Yasukōchi Jiichirō; 1883–1968) was a Japanese photographer.
