= Maroni Kumazawa =

Japanese photographer

Maroni Kumazawa (熊沢 麿二, Kumazawa Maroni; 1895–1958) was a Japanese photographer.
