= Rosō Fukuhara =

Japanese photographer

Rosō Fukuhara (福原 路草, Fukuhara Rosō; 1892–1946) was a Japanese photographer noted for a strikingly modern approach to pictorialism.

He was born in Ginza on 16 January 1892, as Nobutatsu Fukuhara (福原 信辰, Fukuhara Nobutatsu), son of Arinobu Fukuhara (福原 有信, Fukuhara Arinobu), the head of Apothecary Shiseidō (which in 1927 would be incorporated as Shiseidō) and Toku Fukuhara (福原 とく, Fukuhara Toku). His three eldest brothers died young, but another older brother, Shinzō, would also win great fame as a photographer and the last, Nobuyoshi (信義, b.1897) would win some fame too, under the name Tōru Namiki (並木 透, Namiki Tōru).

Fukuhara studied French at Keio University (Tokyo) from 1911 to 1917. His photographic activities were amateur but rigorous; his photographs employed both shallow focus and rather incongruous juxtapositions to great effect. Half of a photograph by Fukuhara might be taken up by corrugated metal fencing.

Fukuhara died on 29 September 1946 in Nagano.

== Books showing Fukuhara's works ==
- (in Japanese) Fukuhara Shinzō, Fukuhara Rosō: Hikari to sono kaichō (福原信三 福原路草：光とその諧調, Shinzō Fukuhara, Rosō Fukuhara: Light and its harmony). Nikon Salon Books 3. Tokyo: Nikkor Club, 1977.
- (in Japanese) Fukuhara Shinzō to Fukuhara Rosō (福原信三と福原路草, Shinzō Fukuhara and Rosō Fukuhara). Nihon no Shashinka 3. Tokyo: Iwanami, 1997. ISBN 4-00-008343-0.
- Hikari no shijō: Fukuhara Shinzō no sekai (光の詩情：福原信三の世界) / The World of Shinzo Fukuhara: Poetics of Light. Tokyo: Shiseido Corporate Culture Department, 1994.
- Hikari to sono kaichō: Fukuhara Shinzō, Fukuhara Rosō: 1913-nen – 1941-nen (光とその諧調：福原信三・福原路草：1913年–1941年) / The Light with Its Harmony: Shinzo Fukuhara / Roso Fukuhara: Photographs 1913–1941. Tokyo: Watari-um, 1992. ISBN 4-900398-17-9.
- (in French) Iizawa, Kohtaro, and Hervé Chandès. Shinzo et Roso Fukuhara. Paris: Fondation Cartier pour l'art contemporain, 1994. ISBN 2869250487.

== Other sources ==
- (in Japanese) Tokyo Metropolitan Museum of Photography, editor. 328 Outstanding Japanese Photographers (『日本写真家事典』, Nihon shashinka jiten). Kyoto: Tankōsha, 2000. ISBN 4-473-01750-8
