= Shinzō Fukuhara =

Japanese photographer

Shinzō Fukuhara (福原 信三, Fukuhara Shinzō; July 25, 1883 – November 4, 1948) was a Japanese photographer.

He was born in Kyōbashi-ku, Tokyo, on 25 July 1883, as the fourth son of Arinobu Fukuhara, the head of Apothecary Shiseidō (which in 1927 would be incorporated as Shiseidō) and Toku Fukuhara (福原 とく). The third brother predeceased his birth, so he was named and treated as the third son. His two other elder brothers also died young, but the next brother, Rosō, would also win fame as a photographer; and, to a lesser degree, his youngest brother Nobuyoshi (信義, b.1897) would too, under the name Tōru Namiki (並木 透).

Fukuhara first used a camera in 1896, if not earlier. He went to Columbia University to study pharmacology in 1908, and after his graduation traveled around England, Germany and Italy before settling in Paris in 1913. While there he certainly viewed much art and is likely to have seen various exhibitions of post-Impressionist works; Iizawa sees the influence of artists such as Seurat in Fukuhara's photographs later collected as "Paris and the Seine."

Fukuhara died on 4 November 1948.

== Photograph series by Fukuhara ==
=== Paris and the Seine ===
- Pari to Seinu (巴里とセイヌ) / Paris et la Seine. Shashin Geijutsusha, 1922. Facsimile ed. Tokyo: Kokushokankōkai, 2007. ISBN 978-4-336-04487-7. New ed. JPS, 1935. Online at Shiseido)

The twenty-four plates are also shown in Yamada, pp. 5–29.

=== Paris and the Seine, continued ===
The ten plates of Le nouveau Paris et la Seine were published one per month in the magazine Shashin Geijutsu (寫眞藝術), from November 1922 through September 1923 (there was a break in January). They are shown in Yamada, pp. 30–44.

=== Hikari to Sono Kaichō ===
- Fukuhara Shinzō Shashin Gashū: Hikari to Sono Kaichō (光福原信三写真画集：光と其諧調). Shashin Geijutsusha, 1923.
- Shinpen fūkei (身辺風景). Shiseido, 1930.

Fourteen plates are shown in Yamada, pp. 55–82.

=== West Lake ===
- Saiko fūkei (西湖風景) / Beautiful West Lake. Tokyo: JPS, 1931. A collection of twenty-four numbered plates (about 16×21 cm), and one smaller plate as a frontispiece. A supplementary title page announces the book in English as Light with It Harmony; it has no Japanese-language counterpart. (online at Shiseido).

=== Matsue ===
- Matsue fūkei (松江風景) / The Old Town of Matsue. JPS, 1935. (online at Shiseido)

=== Hawai'i ===
- Hawai fūkei (布哇風景) / The Sunny Hawaii. JPS, 1937. (online at Shiseido)

== Texts by Fukuhara ==
- Tabi no shashin satsuei annai (旅の写真撮影案内). Asahi Shinbunsha, 1937.
- Fukuhara Shinzō zuihitsu: Shashin o kataru (福原信三随筆：寫眞を語る). Musashi Shobō, 1943.
- Fukuhara Shinzō ronsetsu: Shashin geijutsu (福原信三論説：寫眞藝術). Musashi Shobō, 1943.

== References and further reading ==
- (in Japanese) Fukuhara Shinzō (福原信三). Ed. 矢部信寿. Shiseido, 1970.
- (in Japanese) Fukuhara Shinzō, Fukuhara Rosō: Hikari to sono kaichō (福原信三 福原路草：光とその諧調, Shinzō Fukuhara, Rosō Fukuhara: Light and its harmony). Nikon Salon Books 3. Tokyo: Nikkor Club, 1977.
- (in Japanese) Fukuhara Shinzō to bijutsu to Shiseidō ten (福原信三と美術と資生堂展) / Shinzo Fukuhara: Art and Shiseido. Tokyo: Setagaya Art Museum, 2007. Catalogue of an exhibition held at the museum in 2007, concentrating more on Fukuhara's influence than on his own works. Despite the alternative title, in Japanese only.
- (in Japanese) Fukuhara Shinzō to Fukuhara Rosō (福原信三と福原路草, Shinzō Fukuhara and Rosō Fukuhara). Nihon no Shashinka 3. Tokyo: Iwanami, 1997. ISBN 4-00-008343-0.
- Hikari no shijō: Fukuhara Shinzō no sekai (光の詩情：福原信三の世界) / The World of Shinzo Fukuhara: Poetics of Light. Tokyo: Shiseido Corporate Culture Department, 1994.
- Hikari no shijin: Fukuhara Shinzō, Nobutatsu, Nobuyoshi shashinten (光の詩人：福原信三・信辰・信義写真展). Tokyo: Shiseido Corporate Culture Department, 1994.
- Hikari to sono kaichō: Fukuhara Shinzō, Fukuhara Rosō: 1913-nen – 1941-nen (光とその諧調：福原信三・福原路草：1913年–1941年) / The Light with Its Harmony: Shinzo Fukuhara / Roso Fukuhara: Photographs 1913–1941. Tokyo: Watari-um, 1992. ISBN 4-900398-17-9. Text in Japanese and English.
- (in Japanese) Niwa (丹羽晴美). Nihon shashinka jiten (日本写真家事典) / 328 Outstanding Japanese Photographers. Kyoto: Tankōsha, 2000. ISBN 4-473-01750-8. P.268.
- (in French) Iizawa, Kohtaro, and Hervé Chandès. Shinzo et Roso Fukuhara. Paris: Fondation Cartier pour l'art contemporain, 1994. ISBN 2869250487.
- Shinzo and Roso Fukuhara: Photographs by Ginza Modern Boys 1913–1941. New York: Sepia International, 2000. Catalogue of an exhibition held at Sepia International, NYC, September–October 2000.
- (in Japanese) Yamada Katsumi (山田勝巳). Shashinka Fukuhara Shinzō no shoshin, 1883–1948 (写真家・福原信三の初心1883–1948, The original purpose of the photographer Shinzō Fukuhara, 1883–1948). Tokyo: Shiseido, distributed by Kyūryūdō, 2005. ISBN 4-7630-0516-2.
