= Gaston Errembault de Dudzeele =

Gaston Errembault de Dudzeele may refer to:

- Gaston Errembault de Dudzeele (died 1888), Belgian diplomat
- Gaston Errembault de Dudzeele (died 1929), Belgian diplomat
