= Sakiko =

- Gender: Female

Origin
- Origin: Japanese
- Meaning: Different meanings depending on the kanji used

Sakiko is a feminine Japanese given name.

== Written forms ==
Sakiko can be written using different kanji characters and can mean:

- 咲子, "bloom/blossom, child"
- 福子, "good fortune, child"
- 祥子, "good fortune, child"
- 先子, "future/desintation, child"
- 咲紀子, "bloom/blossom, era, child"
- 咲貴子 "bloom/blossom, precious, child"
- 佐季子, "aid, season, child"

== Notable people named Sakiko ==
- Sakiko Akutsu (阿久津 咲子; born 1998), Japanese synchronized swimmer
- Sakiko Fukuda-Parr (サキコ・フクダ・パー、福田 咲子), Japanese economist
- Sakiko Ikeda (池田 咲紀子; born 1992), Japanese women's footballer
- Sakiko Ito (伊藤 咲子; born 1958), Japanese singer and actress
- Konoe Sakiko (近衛 前子; 1575-1630) Imperial consort to Emperor Go-Yozei
- Sakiko Matsui (松井 咲子; born 1990), Japanese idol and singer
- Sakiko Nozawa (野沢 咲子; born 1961), Japanese gymnast
- Sakiko Odaka (小高 佐季子; born 2002), Japanese women's professional shogi player
- Sakiko Shimizu (清水 咲子; born 1992), Japanese swimmer
- Sakiko Tamagawa (玉川 紗己子; born 1962), Japanese voice actress
- Sakiko Yamaoka (山岡 さ希子; born 1961), Japanese performance artist

== Fictional characters ==
- Sakiko Togawa (豊川 祥子), a character in the media franchise BanG Dream!

== See also ==
- 3983 Sakiko, a main-belt asteroid
