= Jōsaku =

Jōsaku is a masculine given name. Notable people with the name include:

- Jōsaku Maeda (1926–2007), Japanese painter and printmaker
- Hon'inbō Jōsaku (1803–1847), Japanese go player
