= Krzysztof Jung =

Polish painter (1951–1998)

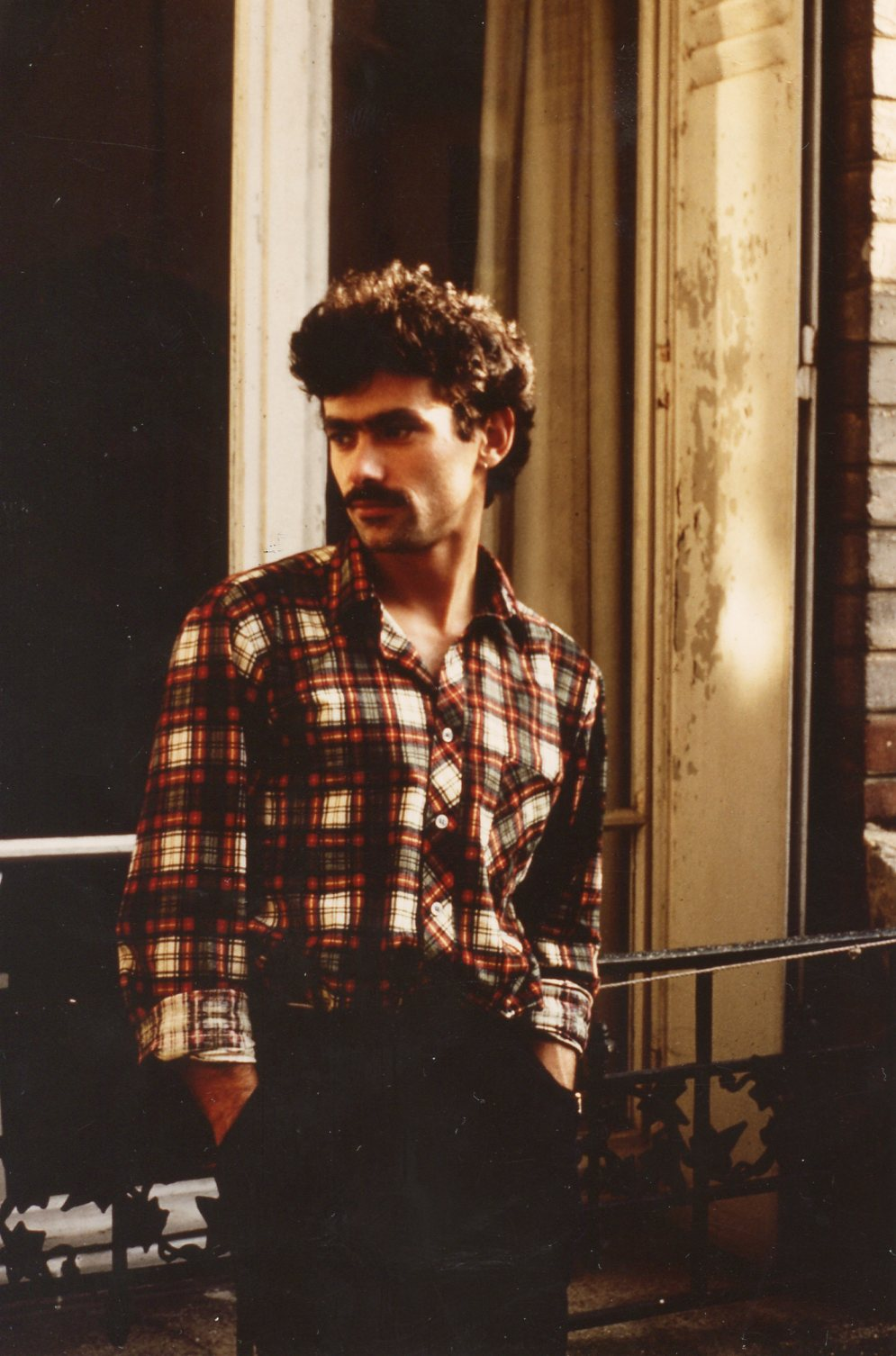
- Jung in 1983
- Born: 11 July 1951; Warsaw, Poland
- Died: 5 October 1998 (aged 47); Warsaw
- Education: Academy of Fine Arts in Warsaw
- Known for: Painting, drawing, performance art
- Website: krzysztofjung.com

Krzysztof Jung (11 July 1951 in Warsaw – 5 October 1998 in Warsaw) was a Polish painter, graphic artist, performer, teacher and creator of the conception of the Plastic Theatre.

== Life ==
Studied at the Faculty of Interior Design of the Academy of Fine Arts in Warsaw in 1971-76. In 1978-79, he ran the neo-avant-garde Repassage gallery, which promoted performance art. He was involved in the first period of Polish performance art. Despite government censorship, his performances as well as his drawings and paintings, which treated homoerotic themes, helped to open the way for LGBT art in Poland. In his capacity as teacher and gallery manager he attracted a group of artists and intellectuals who audaciously addressed the issue of both political and sexual freedom in art. In 1983, under the influence of writer Wojciech Karpiński and after getting to know painter Józef Czapski in Paris, he focused on painting. He was mainly interested in landscapes, paintings with strong, saturated colours, to which he also gave symbolic meaning. Beginning in 1988 he published pencil portraits of prominent writers including Józef Czapski, Joseph Brodsky, Zbigniew Herbert, Konstanty Jeleński, Czesław Miłosz and James Merrill for the literary journal Zeszyty Literackie newly created in Paris. He died from asthma in 1998.

== Art and concept of the Plastic Theatre ==
The most distinctive aspect of Krzysztof Jung's work and performances was his conception of the Plastic Theatre, threading: wrapping thread around persons, objects and rooms. He first applied it in his master's degree project The Visual and Non-Visual Aspects of Space (1976). It consisted of the environment of the threaded space and of the performance, a naked man sitting on a chair freeing himself of the 'cocoon' in which the artist has entangled him. A triptych made in March 1978 in the Repassage gallery is the best example of Jung's threadings. It consisted of the environment, Chair, a chair frame suspended right above the floor on an irregular net woven from thin thread, and two performances, Transformation and Love. The idea behind the conception of the Plastic Theatre was searching for a shared, visual and at the same time sensuous equivalent of the sensual experience. As Paweł Leszkowicz wrote: 'The central place in the Polish artistic and homoerotic masculinity in the Polish art under communism belongs to Krzysztof Jung, whom the artist Grzegorz Kowalski considered to be the pioneer of the body art that dominated Polish art in the 1990s. I consider him to be also the precursor of 'homosexual art', i.e. the art that enters new regions of sexuality and sensuality that aims at opening masculinity. Krzysztof Jung, who died from asthma in 1998, would be the precursor of Polish queer art.'

During his time at Repassage Jung also organized street happenings, which critiqued the surrounding social and political reality. His other focus was painting and drawing. Already as a student, Jung never stopped drawing. In the 1970s he drew series of stylized, perfectionistically detailed images of insects, erotic themes and scenes inspired by literature (including Kafka's Metamorphosis). In the 1980s he was also inspired by his many trips across Europe, as Wojciech Karpiński wrote: 'At that time, he had only just turned back to classic forms of artistic expression from a period of extremely modern activities. He painted a series of splendid landscapes influenced by Józef Czapski's paintings. He needed to renew himself and to strengthen his language, to make it possible to engage in a creative dialogue with the world.'

After Jung's death, solo exhibitions of his work were held at the National Museum in Warsaw (1999), the Academy of Fine Arts in Warsaw (2016), Bibliothèque Polonaise in Paris (2017) and Schwules Museum in Berlin (2019).

== Exhibitions ==
=== Selected exhibitions and individual events ===
- 1974 - exhibition at 44 Aleje Jerozolimskie, Warsaw
- 1976 - The visual and non-visual aspects of space - Repassage gallery, Warsaw
- 1977 - Public entanglement of space - Repassage gallery, Warsaw
- 1978 - Two red ones, or a spatial poem about the regime - Repassage 2 gallery, Warsaw
- 1979 - Responsibility - action at the main gate of the University of Warsaw; Cocooning performance - Repassage 2 gallery, Warsaw
- 1980 - Conversation performance - Re'Repassage gallery, Warsaw; Creating through others and a horizon of freedom - Re'Repassage gallery, Warsaw
- 1981 - Still-life action - Re'Repassage gallery, Warsaw
- 1982 - Instruct me, and I will be quiet, and show me where I have erred performance - Barbara and Wiktor Gutts' studio, Warsaw; Caprichos XIII - The sleep of reason produces monsters performance - Barbara and Wiktor Gutts' studio, Warsaw
- 1989 - Paradise - Dziekanka gallery, Warsaw; 'Trees at the centre of the world' - Pokaz gallery, Warsaw
- 1992 - Landscape with Saint Sebastian - Dziekanka gallery, Warsaw
- 1999 - Krzysztof Jung 1951-1998 - posthumous exhibition at the Xawery Dunikowski Collection of the National Museum in Warsaw, Warsaw
- 2016 - Krzysztof Jung: Metamorphosis, Museum of the Academy of Fine Arts in Warsaw
- 2017 - Krzysztof Jung: Trees and faces, Bibliothèque Polonaise, Paris
- 2019 - Krzysztof Jung: Zeichnungen | Drawings, Schwules Museum, Berlin

=== Selected group exhibitions ===
- 1978 - Seventh Festival of the Fine Arts - Warsaw
- 1979 - Eroticism - House of the Artist, Warsaw; Documentation of selected actions 1977-79 - Repassage 2 gallery, Warsaw
- 1980 - All-Poland Confrontations, art by young people, Art Propaganda Centre, Łódź; Unpublished catalogue. Show of 1974-80 documentation - Re'Repassage gallery, Warsaw
- 1989 - Pole German Russian - Zakłady Norblina, Warsaw
- 1993 - Sigma. Galeria. Repassage. Repassage 2, Re'Repassage - Zachęta National Gallery of Art, Warsaw
- 1997 - CARTOGRAPHERS. GEO-GNOSTIC PROJECTION FOR THE 21ST CENTURY - Zagreb, Croatia; Ujazdowski Castle Centre for Contemporary Art, Warsaw (1998); Budapest, Hungary (1998); Maribor, Slovenia (1998)
- 2010 - Ars HomoErotica - National Museum in Warsaw
- 2023-2024 – Multiple Realities: Experimental Art in the Eastern Bloc, 1960s-1980s, Walker Art Center, Minneapolis (2023-2024), Phoenix Art Museum (2024), Vancouver Art Gallery (2024)
- 2024 – Arkadia – National Museum in Warsaw

== Bibliography ==
- Krzysztof Jung. Catalog of the exhibition edited by Grzegorz Kowalski and Maryla Sitkowska, Warsaw 2001
- Krzysztof Jung. The Male Nude | Der männliche Akt, Berlin 2019
- Krzysztof Jung : Peintures, dessins, photographies. Edited by Wojciech Karpiński, Paris 2017
- Krzysztof Jung : Metamorphosis. Catalog of the exhibition edited by Katarzyna Urbańska, Warsaw 2016
- Paweł Leszkowicz, Art pride : gay art from Poland, Warsaw 2010
- Paweł Leszkowicz, Male nude : Naked Man in Polish Art after 1945, Poznań 2012

=== Filmography ===
- Biographical film Imago of Krzyś directed by Adam Janisch and Barbara Janisch, Berlin 2016
