= Stanislao Lepri =

Italian surrealist painter and consul

Stanislao Lepri (12 June 1905 - 1980) was an Italian surrealist painter and former Italian consul to the Principality of Monaco.

== Biography ==
Born in the house of "marquis Lepri marquis of Rota" Member of the Roman nobility, Stanislao Lepri was the Italian consul for the Principality of Monaco. He moved to Paris in 1940 where he befriended artists such as Picasso, Ernst, and Breton. Their influence can be seen in his later works.

The following year he met Leonor Fini and in 1943 when he was called back to Rome she went with him and stayed until the end of the World War II. In 1946 they returned to Paris and Lepri abandoned his diplomatic career to become a painter. Shortly after Fabrizio Clerici introduced Fini to Polish writer Konstanty Jeleński, known as Kot, in Rome in 1952 Jeleński joined Fini and Lepri in their Paris apartment and the three remained inseparable until their deaths.

Lepri was a theatre set designer and an illustrator. Among his various creations were the scenes for Voyage aux états de la Lune by Cyrano de Bergerac and in 1950 the costumes for L'Armida in Florence for the Maggio Fiorentino.
