= Carlo Sforza =

Italian diplomat and politician (1872–1952)

Count Carlo Sforza
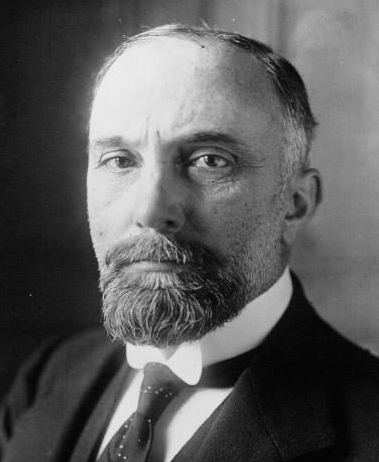

President of the National Council
- In office 25 September 1945 – 1 June 1946
- Preceded by: Vittorio Emanuele Orlando
- Succeeded by: Giuseppe Saragat

Minister of Foreign Affairs
- In office 2 February 1947 – 19 July 1951
- Prime Minister: Alcide De Gasperi
- Preceded by: Pietro Nenni
- Succeeded by: Alcide De Gasperi
- In office 15 June 1920 – 4 July 1921
- Prime Minister: Giovanni Giolitti
- Preceded by: Vittorio Scajola
- Succeeded by: Ivanoe Bonomi

Member of the Constituent Assembly
- In office 25 June 1946 – 31 January 1948
- Constituency: Italy at-large

Member of the Senate
- In office 8 May 1948 – 4 September 1952 (Ex officio)
- In office 11 August 1919 – 7 November 1947
- Appointed by: Victor Emmanuel III

Personal details
- Born: 24 January 1872 Lucca, Kingdom of Italy
- Died: 4 September 1952 (aged 80) Rome, Italy
- Party: PRI
- Education: University of Pisa

Count Carlo Sforza (24 January 1872 – 4 September 1952) was an Italian nobleman, diplomat and anti-fascist politician.

== Life and career ==
Sforza was born in Lucca, the second son of Count Giovanni Sforza (1846-1922), an archivist and noted historian from Montignoso, Tuscany, and Elisabetta Pierantoni, born in a family of rich silk merchants. His father was a descendant of the Counts of Castel San Giovanni, an illegitimate branch of the House of Sforza who had ruled the Duchy of Milan in the fifteenth and sixteenth centuries. At the death of his older brother in 1936, Carlo inherited the hereditary title of Count granted to their father in 1910.

The Count was a member of the ancient Sforza dynasty, descendant from a branch of the Dukes of Milan, and related to the Pallavicini family as well as other Italian noble families, such as the Medici and Orsini. His wife, Countess Valentina Errembault de Dudzeele (1875 - 1969) was from an old Belgian noble family.

After graduating in law from the University of Pisa, Sforza entered the diplomatic service in 1896. He served as consular attaché in Cairo (1896) and Paris (1897), then as consular secretary in Constantinople (1901) and Beijing. He was then appointed chargé d'affaires in Bucharest in 1905, but a diplomatic incident caused him to resign in December of the same year. Nevertheless, he was sent as private secretary of Marquis Emilio Visconti-Venosta, the Italian delegate to the Algeciras Conference.

Visconti-Venosta's recommendation earned him the post of first secretary of legation in Madrid (1906-1907), before being sent as chargé d'affaires in Constantinople (1908-1909) where he witnessed the Young Turk Revolution. Counsellor of the Embassy at London in 1909, he then made his first experience of government as cabinet secretary of the Italian foreign minister for some months in the Fortis cabinet. From 1911 to 1915, he was sent to China. where he witnessed the 1911 Revolution which ended the Qing dynasty and renegotiated the statute of the Italian concession of Tientsin with the new Chinese authorities.

Sforza was in favour of an Italian intervention in the First World War on the side of the Allies. From 1915 to 1919, he was sent as ambassador in Corfu to the exiled Serbian government. After the First World War he became Italian foreign minister under Giovanni Giolitti. In 1921 Sforza upset nationalist right-wing forces by signing the Rapallo Treaty which recognised the important port of Fiume as a free city. As minister of Foreign Affairs, he was instrumental in breaking the proto-fascist feud led by poet Gabriele D'Annunzio in Fiume. He remained foreign minister until the fall of the Giolitti cabinet on 4 July 1921.

Sforza was appointed ambassador to France in February 1922 but resigned from office nine months later on 31 October after Benito Mussolini had gained power. In June 1924, when Mussolini was weakened by news of the murder of a Socialist deputy in parliament and opponents debated their course of action, Sforza quietly proposed a swift attack to depose him but was unable to find men capable of such a strong-arm plot. Sforza led the anti-fascist opposition in the Senate until being forced into exile in 1926. While living in exile in Belgium, the native country of his wife, Sforza published the books, European Dictatorships, Contemporary Italy, Synthesis of Europe, as well as many articles where he analysed the fascist ideology and attacked its many well-wishers as well as different "appeasers" in England, France and elsewhere. He published the 1928 book L'Enigme Chinoise based on his experiences in China.

Sforza was a critic of the Holy See's decision to consecrate the first six Chinese bishops in modern times. He who contended that the Holy See had been naively optimistic in consecrating the bishops and that the supremacy of the Aryan race was unchallenged.

After the murder in France in 1937 of Carlo Rosselli, leader of the Giustizia e Libertà movement (non-marxist left), Count Sforza became the de facto leader of Italian antifascism in exile.

Sforza lived in Belgium and France until the German occupation in June 1940. He then settled in England where he lived until moving on to the United States, where he joined the antifascist Mazzini Society. Attending the Italian-American Congress in Montevideo, Uruguay, in August 1942, he presented an eight-point agenda for the establishment of an Italian liberal democratic republic within the Atlantic Charter. The conference approved Sforza's agenda and acclaimed him "spiritual head of the Italian antifascists."

After the surrender in September 1943, he returned to his country. In June 1944 he accepted the offer of Ivanoe Bonomi to join his provisional antifascist government. In 1946 Sforza became a member of the Italian Republican Party.

As foreign minister (1947–1951) he supported the European Recovery Program and the settlement of Trieste. He was a convinced advocate and one of the designers of Italy's pro-European policy and with De Gasperi he led Italy into the Council of Europe. On 18 April 1951, he signed the Treaty instituting the European Coal and Steel Community, making Italy one of the founding members.

Count Carlo Sforza died in Rome in 1952.

== Family ==
On 4 March 1911 in Vienna, Sforza married a Belgian aristocrat, Countess Valentine Errembault de Dudzeele et d'Orroir (Bern 4 March 1875 – Rome, 31 January 1969), whose father, Count Gaston (1847-1929), was Belgian ambassador to Constantinople and later to Vienna, and whose brother, Count Gaston Errembault de Dudzeele, would marry in 1920 the widow of Prince Mirko of Montenegro, himself a brother-in-law of the King of Italy. As a child, Countess Valentina had been educated with the twin sons of a chambermaid of her mother: they were rumoured to be the illegitimate sons of her father and one of them would become the father of Hergé, creator of Tintin.

Sforza and his wife had a daughter, Fiammetta (Beijing 3 October 1914 – 2002), who married Howard Scott ("a divorced father-of-two non-Catholic and penniless Englishman"), and a son, Count Sforza-Galeazzo («Sforzino») Sforza (Corfu 6 September 1916 – Strasbourg 28 December 1977), a sculptor, for a time the lover of Argentine painter Leonor Fini, and later Deputy Secretary General of the Council of Europe (1968-1978). The latter first married Corinne Simon (1927-2011) and then Anne Spehner, but did not leave a son and at his death, the title of Count passed to a cousin.

Carlo Sforza was also the alleged biological father of Konstanty Jeleński.

== Honours ==
Grand cordon of the Order of Saints Maurice and Lazarus – 21 December 1919

Knight Grand Cross of the Order of the Crown of Italy - 29 February 1920

Knight of the Supreme Order of the Most Holy Annunciation - 21 December 1920

Knight Grand Cross of the Colonial Order of the Star of Italy - 25 November 1920

Cross of Liberty for Military Leadership, Grade I

== Notes ==
Political offices
Preceded by Vittorio Emanuele Orlando (Chamber of Deputies); Pietro Tomasi Della Torretta (Senate)	President of the Italian National Consult; 1945–1946	Succeeded by Giuseppe Saragat (Constituent Assembly)
Preceded by Vittorio Scialoja	Italian Minister of Foreign Affairs; 1920–1921	Succeeded by Pietro Tommasi della Torretta
Preceded by Pietro Nenni	Italian Minister of Foreign Affairs; 1947–1951	Succeeded by Alcide De Gasperi
