= Wojciech Karpiński =

Polish writer and literary critic (1943–2020)

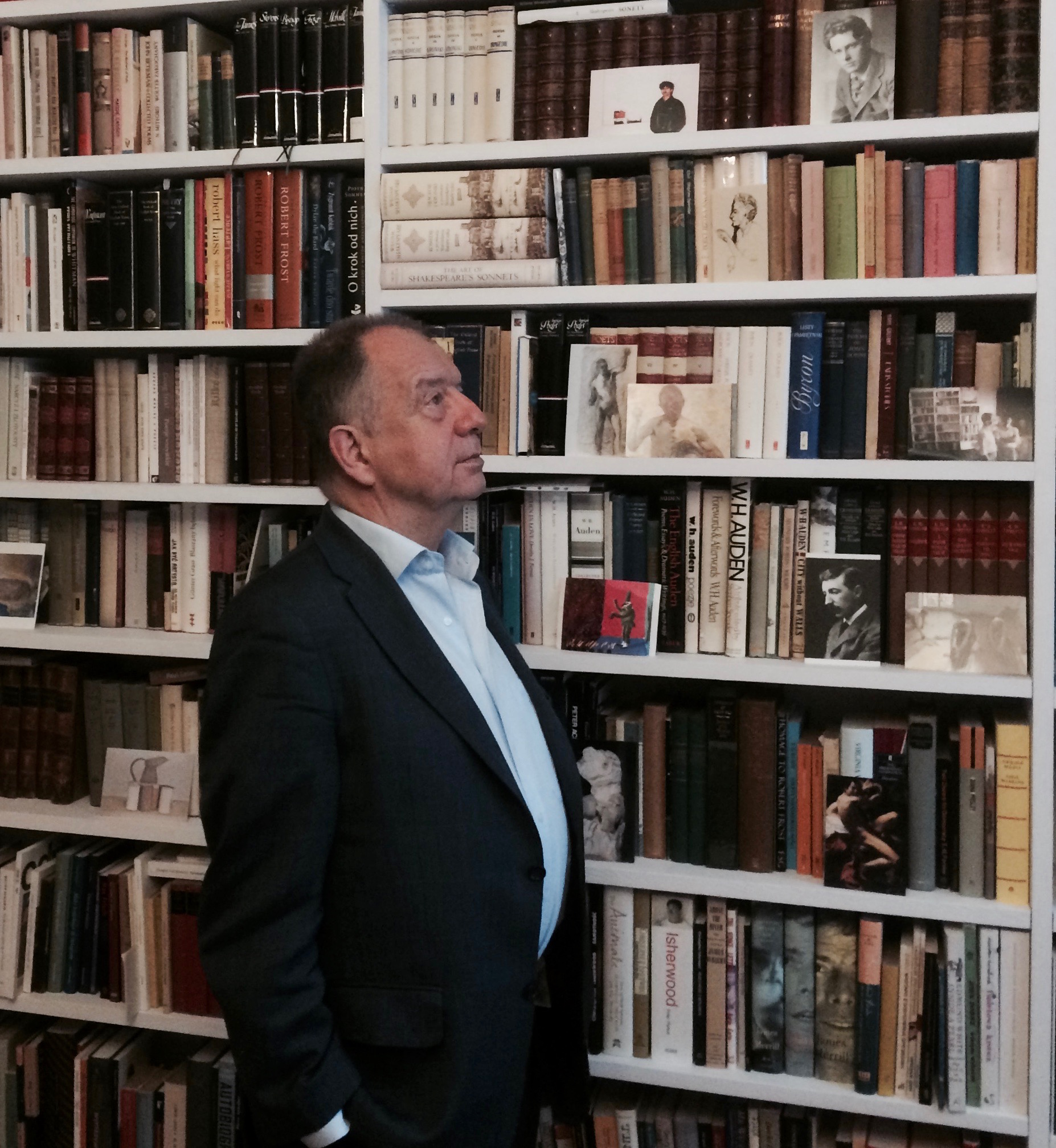
- Wojciech Karpiński (2016)
- Born: 11 May 1943; Warsaw
- Died: 18 August 2020 (aged 77); Paris
- Occupations: Writer, historian of ideas
- Website: wojciechkarpinski.com

Wojciech Karpiński (11 May 1943 – 18 August 2020) was a Polish writer, historian of ideas and literary critic.

== Life ==
Wojciech Karpiński was born on 11 May 1943 in Warsaw, the son of the architect Zbigniew Karpiński and a grandson of Wojciech Zatwarnicki (1874–1948), who during World War II operated a HeHalutz farm on his estate in the Warsaw district of Czerniaków, saving the lives of many Jews from the Warsaw Ghetto. He is also nephew of the poet Światopełk Karpiński.

Karpiński graduated from the University of Warsaw in 1966 with a degree in Romance languages and literatures and in 1967 became a lecturer. In the 1960s he started collaboration with the Kultura émigré monthly, and in 1970 began to write essays for it under various pen names to avoid persecution by Poland's Communist regime.

In the 1960s he began to travel to Western Europe, where he was able to meet the Polish émigré ‘outlaw writers’ he admired: Aleksander Wat, Konstanty A. Jeleński, Józef Czapski, Witold Gombrowicz, Gustaw Herling-Grudziński, Jerzy Stempowski and Czesław Miłosz; he embarked on promoting and interpreting their writings.

In the late 1960s he joined the Polish democratic opposition. He obtained his doctorate in 1970, and the same year was expelled from the university because his brother Jakub Karpiński had been sentenced by a court of the People's Republic of Poland in the political trial of the so-called Tatra climbers (they were accused of smuggling forbidden books through the Tatra Mountains). In 1971–73 he worked for the Polish Academy of Sciences. In the mid-1970s he began to write for one of the few relatively independent publications in Poland, Tygodnik Powszechny, about intellectual history and literature. In 1974 he became an editor of Poland's most important literary monthly, Twórczość. In 1975 he signed the Letter of the 59 protesting changes in Poland's constitution intended to subject Poland fully to the USSR. He then joined Zdzisław Najder in creating the Alliance for Polish Independence—Polish democratic opposition underground think tank. Since 1975 he collaborated with the Polish Section of Radio Free Europe. In 1979, together with Marcin Król, he founded the independent journal Res Publica.

Karpiński joined the Solidarity trade union in 1980. In 1981 he travelled to the United States on a Department of State Bureau of Educational and Cultural Affairs grant. When martial law was proclaimed in Poland on 13 December 1981, his name was on an official list of interned ‘extremist activists of Solidarity and other illegal organizations’ published by the government daily Trybuna Ludu (17 December 1981)—despite the fact that he was out of the country. In New York City he was one of the creators of the Committee in Support of Solidarity.

In 1982 he taught in the Department of Political Science of Yale University. In March 1982 he testified about repressions in Poland before the Foreign Relations Committee of the US Senate. In 1982–2002 he served as a member of the executive committee of the Paris-based Fund for Assistance to Independent Literature and Learning in Poland. Since 1982 he has been an editor of Zeszyty Literackie, a journal launched in Paris during martial law in Poland.

Karpiński moved to France in 1982, where in between 1982 and 2008 he worked as a researcher of the Centre National de la Recherche Scientifique in Paris. He has taught at the University of Texas in Austin (1990) and New York University (1994–95, invited by Tony Judt). He died in Paris.

== Work ==
Karpiński made his writing debut in 1964 with an essay on François de La Rochefoucauld. He went on to publish in Kultura, Res Publica, Tygodnik Powszechny, Znak, Zeszyty Literackie and Gazeta Wyborcza.

In Poland, despite Communist-era censorship, Karpiński sneaked articles about banned émigré writers, including Gustaw Herling-Grudziński, Konstanty A. Jeleński and Witold Gombrowicz, into official publications. He shepherded the publication of a volume of essays by Jerzy Stempowski and the first official edition of essays by Konstanty A. Jeleński to be published in the People's Republic of Poland.

In 1974 Karpiński co-wrote Political figures of the 19th century with Marcin Król, which became one of the most discussed publications in the democratic opposition of the 1970s. He continued his reflections on political philosophy, democracy and freedom in Essays about freedom (1980), The Slavic quarrel (1981), Metternich's shadow (1982) and My private history of freedom (1997).

In 1980 Karpiński launched a series of books about the intellectuals in the Polish émigré culture (Józef Czapski, Czesław Miłosz, Witold Gombrowicz, Gustaw Herling-Grudziński, Konstanty A. Jeleński, Jerzy Stempowski, Aleksander Wat) with a samizdat book In Central Park. He also wrote about more universally-known writers and artists (Nicola Chiaromonte, Balthus, David Hockney, Thomas Mann, Vladimir Nabokov, Aleksandr Solzhenitsyn). His subsequent books included Outlaw books (1988), The Blazon of Exile (1982) and Faces (2012).

Two biographies of artists stand out in his work: a painterly and spiritual biography of Vincent van Gogh, Van Gogh's pipe (1994), and a presentation of life and art of Józef Czapski, the author's close friend for decades, A portrait of Czapski (1996). Karpiński wrote about Czapski in numerous essays, and edited a volume in French of Czapski's writings (L'Art et la vie, 2002). He has also written extensively about the painter and performer Krzysztof Jung. In 2016 he published Henryk, a biography combining several literary genres, including the essay, reportage and diary, about Henryk Krzeczkowski.

A memory of Italy devoted to art and culture of Italy appeared as a book in 1982, having initially come out in instalments in Twórczość. After reading these essays, Jarosław Iwaszkiewicz dedicated his poem The Pope in Ancona to Wojciech Karpiński. While working on it in Rome, Karpiński met Miriam Chiaromonte, widow of Italian writer Nicola Chiaromonte, about whom he would subsequently write, edit his unpublished works and translate his work into Polish. Karpiński continued to write about the history of art and culture in travel essays, American shadows (1982) and Images of London (2014).

Karpiński's book-length interviews with Leszek Kołakowski and Alain Besançon appeared in the 1980s. He also wrote essays about Kołakowski for the volume The Blazon of Exile (1989) and gave the laudation for Kołakowski at the ceremony awarding him the Erasmus Prize.

His essays were published in Jan Kott's Four Decades of Polish Essays, a presentation of classic Polish essays of the 20th century.

== Awards and distinctions ==
- Prize of the Kościelski Foundation (1975)
- Ingram Merrill Award (1977)
- Herminia Naglerowa Prize of the Union of Polish Writers in Exile (1984)
- Zygmunt Hertz Prize of Kultura (1989)
- Alfred Jurzykowski Foundation Prize (1989)
- Prize of the Minister of Culture, Poland (2004)
- Officer's Cross of Polonia Restituta (2012)
- Włada Majewska Prize of the Union of Polish Writers in Exile (2013)

== Books ==
In Polish

- Sylwetki polityczne XIX wieku (Political figures of the 19th century), Kraków: Znak, 1974.
- Szkice o wolności (Essays about freedom), Chicago: Polonia Book Fund, 1980.
- W Central Parku (In Central Park), Warsaw: Klin, 1980.
- Słowiański spór (The Slavic quarrel), Kraków: KOS, 1981.
- Cień Metternicha (Metternich's shadow), Warsaw: PIW, 1982.
- Pamięć Włoch (A memory of Italy), Kraków: Wydawnictwo Literackie, 1982.
- Amerykańskie cienie (American shadows), Paris: Instytut Literacki, 1983.
- Książki zbójeckie (Outlaw books), London: Polonia Book Fund, 1988.
- Herb Wygnania (The Blazon of Exile), Paris: Zeszyty Literackie, 1989.
- Polska a Rosja (Poland and Russia), Warszawa, PWN, 1994.
- Fajka van Gogha (Van Gogh's pipe), Wrocław: Wydawnictwo Dolnośląskie, 1994.
- Portret Czapskiego (A portrait of Czapski), Wrocław: Wydawnictwo Dolnośląskie, 1996.
- Prywatna historia wolności (My private history of freedom), Warsaw: Iskry, 1997.
- Twarze (Faces), Warsaw: Zeszyty Literackie, 2012.
- Obrazy Londynu (Images of London), Warsaw: Zeszyty Literackie, 2014.
- Henryk, Warsaw: Zeszyty Literackie, 2016.
- Szkice sekretne (Secret essays), Warsaw: Zeszyty Literackie, 2017.
- 120 dni Kultury, Warsaw–Paris, 2020.

Interviews

- With Leszek Kołakowski, Warsaw: Głosy, 1983.
- With Alain Besançon, Ełk: Lotnia, 1983.

In French

- Ces livres de grand chemin, Montricher: Noir sur Blanc, 1992.
- Portrait de Czapski, Lausanne: L’Age d’Homme, 2003.

Editorial works

- Antologia współczesnej krytyki literackiej we Francji (Anthology of modern literary criticism in France), Warsaw: Czytelnik 1974.
- Jerzy Stempowski, Eseje (Essays), Kraków: Znak, 1984.
- Witold Gombrowicz, Diary, Evanston: Northwestern University Press, 1988 (introduction).
- Konstanty Jeleński, Szkice (Essays), Kraków: Znak, 1990.
- Jerzy Giedroyc, Konstanty Jeleński, Listy 1950–1987 (Correspondence 1950–1987), Warsaw: Czytelnik, 1995.
- Józef Czapski, L’Art et la vie, Paris: L’Age d’Homme-UNESCO, 2002.
- Konstanty Jeleński Listy z Korsyki do Józefa Czapskiego (Letters from Corsica to Józef Czapski), Warsaw: Zeszyty Literackie, 2003.
- Jerzy Stempowski, Notes pour une ombre; suivi de Notes d'un voyage dans le Dauphiné, Montricher: Noir Sur Blanc, 2004.
- Nicola Chiaromonte, Fra me e te la verità. Lettere a Muska, Forli: Una città, 2013.
- Józef Czapski, Proust a Grjazovec, conferenze clandestine, Milano: Adelphi Edizioni, 2015 (introduction).
- Krzysztof Jung : Peintures, dessins, photographies, Paris: Bibliothèque polonaise, 2017.
- Zbigniew Karpiński, Wspomnienia, Warsaw: Biblioteka Kroniki Warszawy, 2018
- Krzysztof Jung, The Male Nude / Der männliche Akt, Berlin: Schwules Museum, 2019
