= Yahel Chirinian =

French contemporary artist

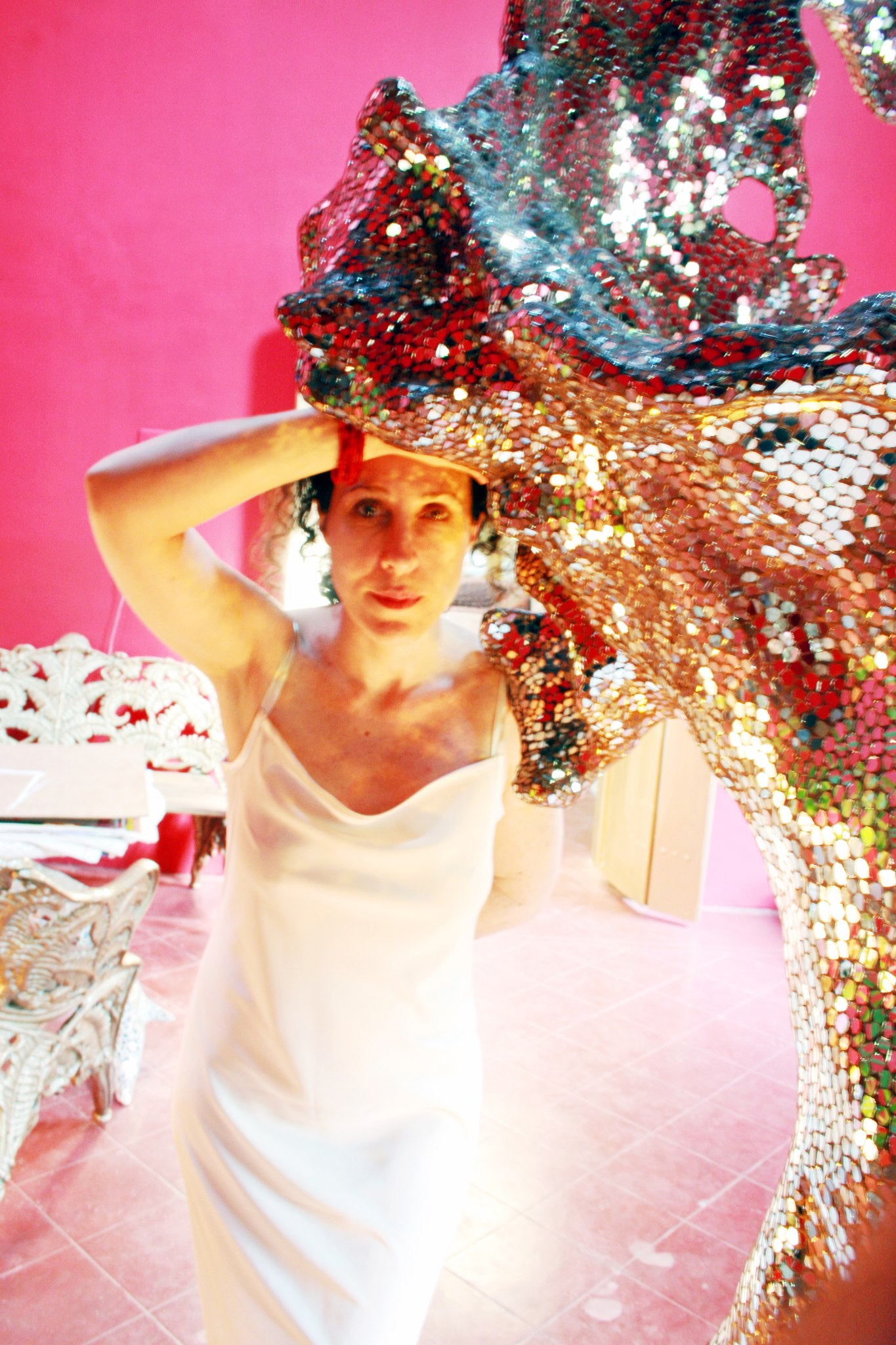
- Born: 29 August 1970 (age 56); Avignon, France
- Education: École Nationale Supérieure des Beaux-Arts (Avignon); Musashino Art University (Tokyo)
- Known for: Plastic artist, sculptor, designer
- Notable work: Can I Help You (2017), Saddhu Pop Exhibition (2010), If I can't dance tonight (2010)

Yahel Chirinian is a French contemporary sculptor and installation artist who lives and works in India. She opened the avant-garde Monsoon Heritage Studio in Goa in 2002 and won the "Goan of the Year" Award in the Arts and Culture category from Lokmat in 2016.

== Biography ==
Yahel Chirinian was born on 29 August 1970 in Avignon (France), where she discovered the world of theatre, contemporary dance, literature and the arts. She won a scholarship to attend Immaculee Conception boarding school in Carpentras, and later earned admission to the École supérieure d'art d'Avignon and won a grant at the Musashino Art University of Tokyo. After studying plastic arts and architecture, she specialized in visual art and conceptual art installations. She settled in Goa (India) in 2002, where she continues her artistic career through her studio, Monsoon Heritage.

== The Monsoon Heritage Studio ==
Chirinian's work reappropriates Hindu sacred icons as well as classic symbols from western art. The artist chooses to represent gods from the Hindu pantheon including Kali and Ganesh, so as other personalities like Shivaji or sadhu's skulls. Her works take the form of sculpture, to which she affixes shards of mirror glass. She cites Jean Cocteau as a major influence, particularly his relationship to the truth and appearances and his perception of the world.

At Monsoon Heritage, Chirinian works with a team of female assistants, hiring women from difficult family and social backgrounds. The studio provides installations for international private collections and art galleries. Chirinian's work also can be found in luxury hotels in India such as the Park Hotel from Kolkatta, Hyderabad and Goa, and the Taj Hotels.

Journalist Karen Lajon, from the "Le journal du dimanche" once asserted "The sculptures of Ganesh have found their place. Whether it is among Indian politicians or Bollywood and Hollywood celebrities, the iconic centerpiece of Yahel Chirinian is now a part of the Indian Artistic heritage."

The National Center of Plastic Arts ("Le Centre national des arts plastiques") describes Chirinian's art as "halfway between holy object and decoration object […], her art makes flirt design and art, pop and baroque, sacred and sacrilege".

== List of exhibitions and installations ==
• May 2013: "The Park Hotel" - Goa (Hospitality)

• March 2012: "Neemrana's Ishavilas" - Goa (Hospitality)

• November - December 2010: Sadhu pop, vanitas vanitatum- Paris (Art Gallery)

• January – February 2010: If I can't dance tonight – Bruxelles (Art gallery)

• May 2008: "The Park Hotel, Aura Spa" - Hyderabad (Hospitality)

== Distinction ==
Chirinian received the award of "Best Artist and Contribution to Art" of the year 2016, in the category Art and Culture. She is the first artist to achieve artistic distinction in India as a woman and a foreigner.
