= Taku Aramasa =

Japanese photographer

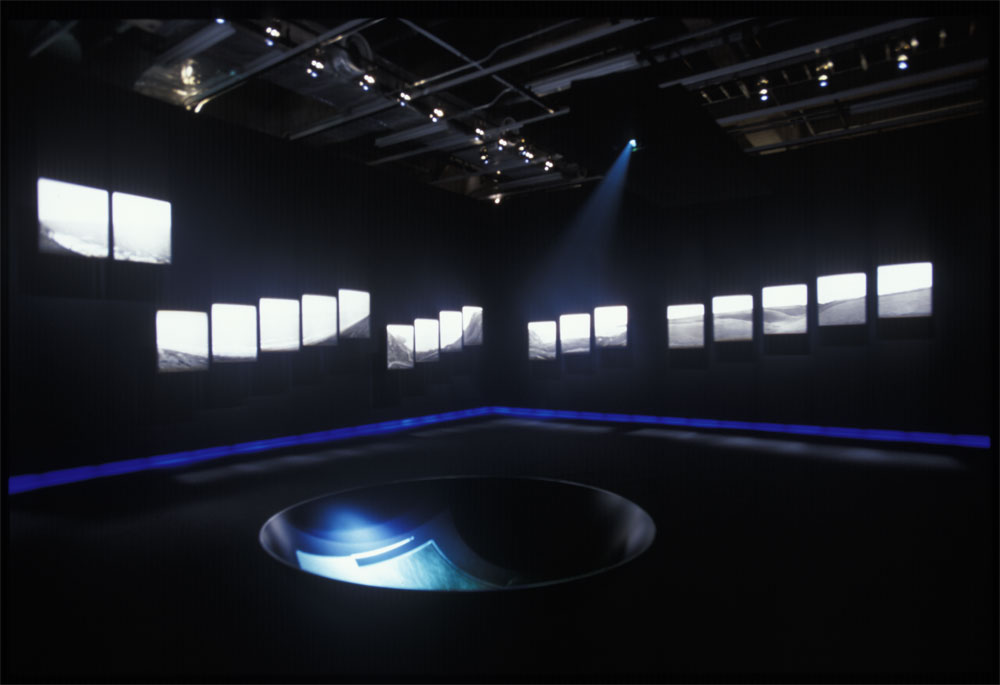
"Aramasa Taku Photographs – Apocalypse," Museum of Musashino Art University, Tokyo (2006)

Taku Aramasa (新正 卓, Aramasa Taku; born 15 August 1936) is a Japanese photographer.

== Early life ==
Born in Tokyo, Aramasa moved with his family to Manchukuo in 1940. In 1948 he moved to Sakata, Yamagata. He graduated from Musashino Art School (武蔵野美術学校, Musashino Bijutsu Gakkō) (now Musashino Art University) in 1960.

== Photography career ==
After graduating art school, Aramasa set up a design company in which he was an art director, but became a freelance in 1970. He worked as a fashion photographer in Paris from 1973 to 1976.

In 1980 he met his parents, from whom he had been separated, and started work on a photographic contribution to the effort of reuniting Japanese war orphans and their biological parents. This work branched into the photography of people of Japanese descent in Hawai'i and South America.

A Portrait of Japanese Immigrants to South America won the Domon Ken Award in 1986; Aramasa subsequently won various other awards.

Aramasa has taught at Musashino Art University from 1993.

== Exhibitions ==
- "A Portrait of Japanese Immigrants to South America," Yurakucho Marion, Tokyo, 1986
- "A Portrait of Japanese Immigrants to South America," Hiroshima and Osaka, Japan, 1987
- "Taku Aramasa Photographs-The 80th Anniversary of Japanese Immigration to Brazil," São Paulo Museum of Modern Art, São Paulo, 1988
- "Family, Commemorative Exhibition of 'Who Am I'," Nikon Salon, Tokyo and Osaka, 1990
- "Who Am I?- War Orphans Left in China," Tokyo Metropolitan Art Gallery, Tokyo, 1991
- "Who Am I?- War Orphans Left in China," Hiroshima and Fukuoka, Japan, 1992
- "Taku Aramasa Photographs: Portraits of Native America," Yuraku-cho Art Forum, Tokyo, Hakata, Nara and Takaoka, Japan, 1994
- "Silent Land-Prison Camps in Siberia," Sinjuku Park Tower Gallery 1, Tokyo, 1995
- "Manchuria/Siberia," Kawasaki City Museum, Kawasaki, Japan, 1996
- "Silent Land-Prison Camps in Siberia," Tokyo Metropolitan Museum of Photography, Tokyo, 1997
- "Aramasa Taku Photographs-America/Promised Land," Mitsumura Art Plaza, Tokyo, 2000
- "11+1 Photographs," Musashino Art University, Department of Imaging Arts 10th Anniversary, Mitsumura Art Plaza, Tokyo, 2000
- "Aramasa Taku Photographs: Portraits of Japanese Immigrants," Polaroid Gallery, Tokyo, 2001
- "Only Skin Deep-Changing vision of the American self," International Center of Photography, New York, NY
- "Aramasa Taku-Sakura," Stephen Wirtz Gallery, San Francisco California, 2005
- "Aramasa Taku Photographs-Apocalypse," Museum of Musashino Art University, Tokyo, 2006
- "Aramasa Taku Photographs-America/promised Land" (platinum prints) Gallery Out of Place, Nara Japan, 2008
- "Aramasa Sakura," Nikon Salon, Tokyo and Osaka, 2008
- ｢frame & vision｣ -blessing in forest- ARAMASA Taku Solo Exhibition Tokyo Gallery+BTAP, 2009
- "ARAMASA Taku Photographs 2011"(Na2 Platina print) One Men Show, OUT of PLACE, Nara, 2011
- "ARAMASA Taku 2012 -HRIZON-" One Men Show, Tokyo Publishing House, Tokyo, 2012
- "ARAMASA Taku 2014 -HRIZON-" One Men Show, Annely Juda Fine Art, London, 2014

== Awards ==
- 28th New Artist of the Year Award, Japan Photography Association, 1978
- Grand Prize (Public Poster) at the 1st International Triennale Toyama, 1985
- the 5th Domon Ken Award, 1986
- the 10th Higashikawa Award, 1994
- the 46th Artist of the Year Award, Japan Photography Association, 1996

== Collections ==
- Center for Creative Photography, University of Arizona, Arizona
- Domon Ken Memorial Hall, Sakata, Japan
- Higashikawa Museum, Higashikawa-cho, Hokkaido, Japan
- São Paulo Museum, São Paulo, Brazil
- History Museum of Japanese Immigrants, São Paulo, Brazil
- International Center of Photography, New York, New York
- Osaka Human Rights History Museum, Osaka, Japan
- San Francisco Museum of Modern Art, San Francisco, California
- History Museum of Japanese Immigrants, San Jose, California
- Tokyo Metropolitan Museum of Photography, Tokyo, Japan
- Stephen Wirtz Gallery, San Francisco, California
- Gallery Out of Place, Nara, Japan
- Museum of Musashino Art University, Tokyo, Japan

== Books ==
=== Books by Aramasa ===
- Gyakkō sango shō (逆光サンゴ礁) Bunka Shuppan-kyoku, 1974
- ERIKA : ARAMASA Taku Photographs, Hokuō-sha, 1976
- Patricia : ARAMASA Taku Photographs, Hokuto-kikaku, 1977
- AMERICAN PARODY : ARAMASA Taku Photographs, Hokuto-kikaku, 1977
- Carnaval : ARAMASA Taku Photographs, Canon, 1979
- To My Angels : ARAMASA Taku Photographs, Zenkoku Shuppan, 1983 ISBN 4-421-01526-1
- A Portrait of Japanese Immigrants to South America : ARAMASA Taku Photographs, Asahi Shinbunsha, 1985. ISBN 4-02-255402-9. Text in Japanese and English (English translation by Lora Sharnoff)
- Who Am I "War Orphans Left in China" : ARAMASA Taku Photographs, Who Am I Publishing Committee, 1990
- Portraits of Native America : ARAMASA Taku Photographs, Kōdansha, 1993. ISBN 4-06-206731-5
- The Silent Land Prison Camps in Siberia : ARAMASA Taku Photographs, Chikuma Shobō, 1995. ISBN 4-480-87274-4
- America Promised Land : ARAMASA Taku Photographs, Misuzu Shobō, 2000. ISBN 4-622-04422-6. Text in Japanese and English
- Apocalypse : ARAMASA Taku Photographs, Musashino Art University, 2006. ISBN 4-901631-73-X
- ARAMASA Taku Photographs – Apocalypse E-book : Musashino Art University, 2007
- ARAMASA Taku Photographs – 1961~2006 E-book : Musashino Art University, 2007
- ARAMASA SAKURA – in black box / in black room : Edition 1/1, 2010
- ARAMASA Taku 2014 HORIZON Catalogue© London, Annely Juda Fine Art, 2014

=== Other books showing Aramasa's work ===
- (in Japanese) Nihon nūdo meisakushū (日本ヌード名作集, Japanese nudes). Camera Mainichi bessatsu. Tokyo: Mainichi Shinbunsha, 1982. Pp. 262–3 show a pair of photographs by Aramasa.
