= Musashino Art University =

Art school in Kodaira, Japan

Coordinates: 35°43′34″N 139°26′51″E

- 武蔵野美術大学
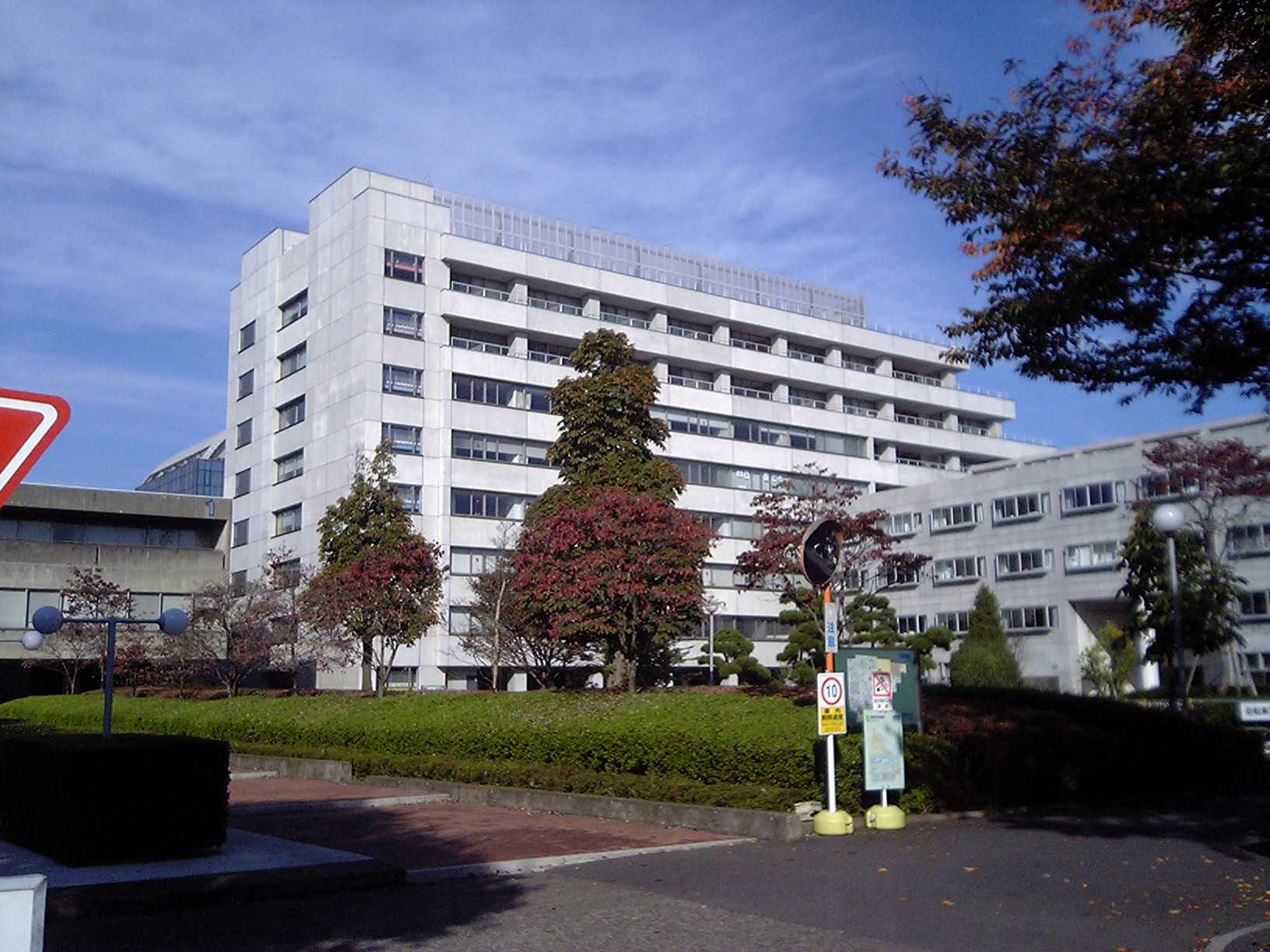
- Motto in English: To foster a new generation of artists and designers with a well-rounded perspective
- Type: Private
- Established: 1929
- President: Kabayama Sachikazu
- Location: Kodaira, Tokyo, Japan
- Campus: Urban
- Colors: Blue
- Website: www.musabi.ac.jp
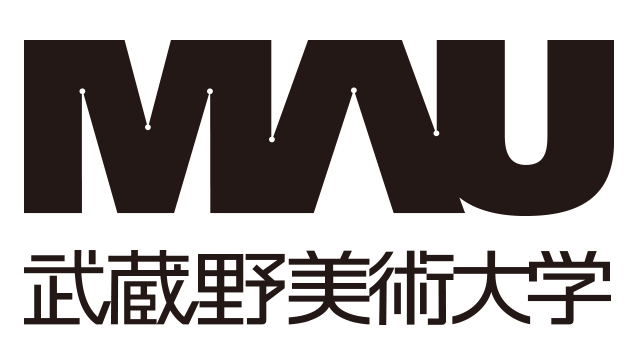

Musashino Art University (武蔵野美術大学, Musashino Bijutsu Daigaku) or Musabi (武蔵美) is a private university in Kodaira, Western Tokyo, founded in 1962 with roots going back to 1929. It is known as one of the leading art universities in Japan.

== History ==
In October 1929, Teikoku Art School (帝国美術学校, Teikoku Bijutsu Gakkō; meaning "imperial art school") was founded. In December 1948, it became Musashino Art School (武蔵野美術学校, Musashino Bijutsu Gakkō), and in April 1962, it was renamed Musashino Art University.

From its start, the university taught fine art and industrial design; it later added architecture, fashion, and other fields.

MAU has exchange agreements with universities in other countries. It has a graduate school that awards master's degrees and doctorates.

== People associated with Musashino Art University ==
=== Alumni ===
- Michiyo Akaishi, manga artist
- Ume Aoki, manga artist
- Kei Aoyama, manga artist
- Shusaku Arakawa, artist and designer
- Tetsuo Araki, print artist
- Taku Aramasa, photographer
- Yahel Chirinian, sculptor and installation artist
- Hiroki Endo, manga artist
- Lily Franky, illustrator, writer, and actor
- Kenya Hara, graphic designer and art director of Muji
- Katsuhito Ishii, film director
- Koji Ishikawa, illustrator
- Paru Itagaki, manga artist
- Satoshi Itō (Project Itoh), science fiction writer
- Kazuo Kamimura, manga artist
- Izumi Katō, contemporary artist
- Miyuki Kobayashi, novelist and scenario writer for manga
- Satoshi Kon, anime director and manga artist
- Goro Kumagai, woodcut printmaker, educator
- Fusako Kuramochi, manga artist
- Tomoki Kyoda, anime director
- Kouji Miura, manga artist
- Junko Mori, artist and metalworker
- Ryū Murakami, novelist and filmmaker
- Joji Nagashima, automobile designer for BMW
- Yurie Nagashima, photographer
- Rei Naito, artist
- Tatzu Nishi, installation artist
- Shinro Ohtake, painter
- Rieko Saibara, manga artist
- Shiori Satō, idol and member of Keyakizaka46
- Shūhō Satō, manga artist
- Soji Shimada, mystery novelist
- Yuko Shimizu, designer of Hello Kitty
- Ryoko Suzuki, contemporary artist
- Keita Takahashi, game designer
- Yellow Tanabe, manga artist
- Yukinori Yanagi, contemporary artist
- Akimi Yoshida, manga artist
- Sakiko Yamaoka, performance artist, Phenomenology of Truth

=== Teachers ===
- Taku Aramasa, photographer
- Seiichi Hishikawa, filmmaker, art director, and photographer
- Jōsaku Maeda, painter and printmaker, professor and president (1994–)
- Yurie Nagashima, photographer
- Yoshiharu Sekino, cultural anthropologist

=== Presidents ===
- Jōsaku Maeda (1994– ) – painter, former professor at Kyoto City University of Arts
- Kabayama Sachikazu (current)
