= Koji Ishikawa (illustrator) =

Japanese children's book author and illustrator

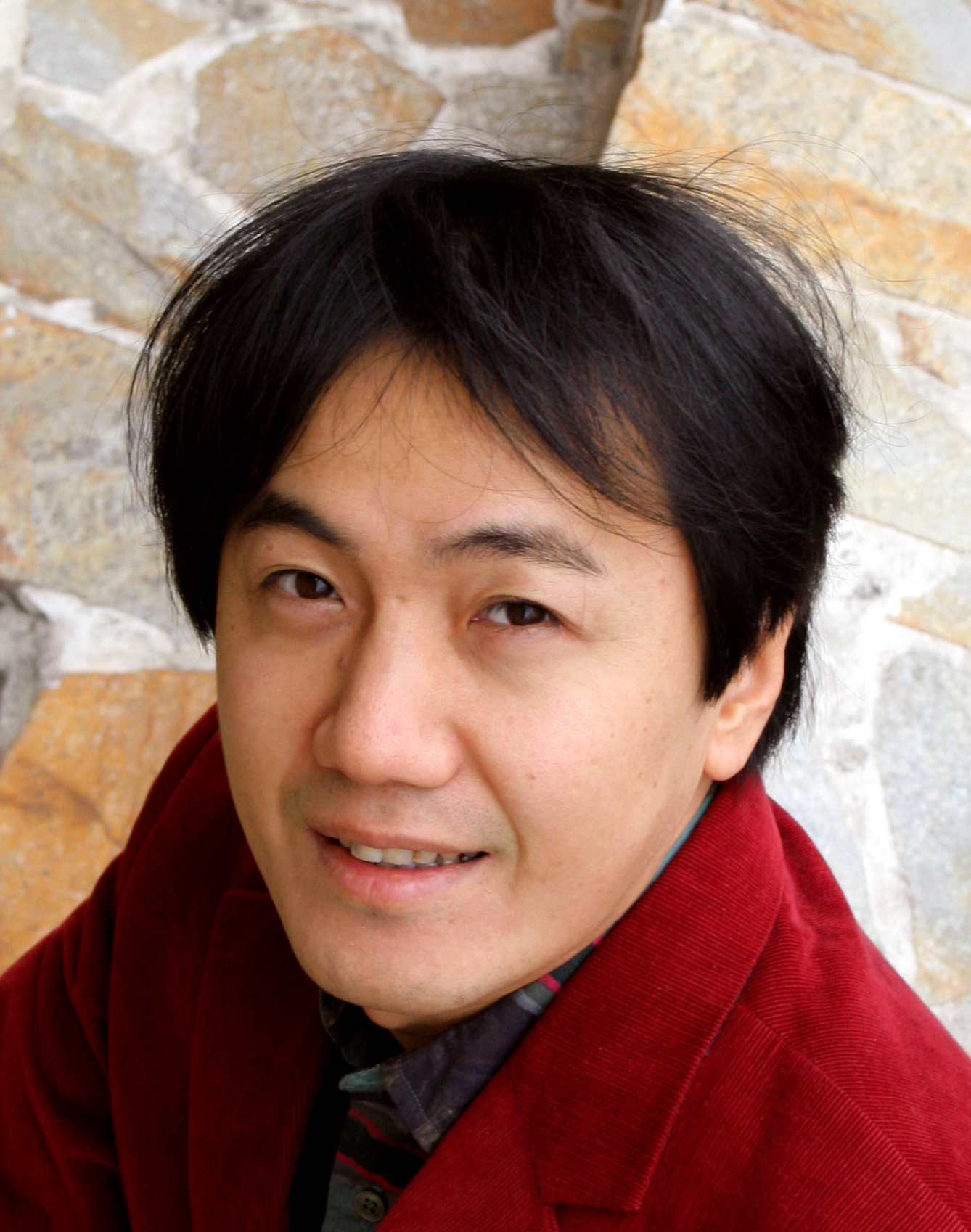
Image of Kojiishikawa

Kōji Ishikawa (石川 浩二, Ishikawa Kōji; pen name: いしかわ こうじ, born October 4, 1963) is a Japanese children's book author and illustrator. His work includes advertisements, magazine illustration, web, character design and book design. In recent years he has made children's books. He lives in Tokyo with his wife and two children.

== Biography ==
Kōji Ishikawa was born in Chiba Prefecture Japan in 1963. As a child he loved painting, handicraft and origami. Ishikawa attended Musashino Art University, and studied visual communication design. He was awarded Kodansha picture for children Grand Prix, while in university. From that time, he began work as illustrator.

He has appeared on television programs and in magazines, and has lectured on digital art. He is one of the pioneers of digital illustration. His main painting tools are Corel Painter and Adobe Photoshop. He has also written a book on the technique of the digital illustration using Corel Painter ("Happy Painter Life"). In 1999 he developed "Paper Dog" (ペーパーわんこ; Pēpāwanko), and "Paper Cat" (ペーパーにゃんこ; Pēpānyanko). These are small dogs and cats made from paper. The picture-book of Paper Dogs "Living with 100 dogs" were announced in 2002. The Italy Bologna international picture-book original picture exhibition accepted the paper dog photo story "Kotaro's trip" in 2004. It is extolled by the French judge Xavier Pingaud. Picture-books "Colorful Animals hide and seek" and "Colorful Vehicles hide and seek" were announced in 2006. Translations of This series appeared in France, South Korea and China. The number of copies is over 1550,000 copies in the whole series. In 2008, Ishikawa released three picture-books, "Colorful Fruits hide and seek", "Patterned Animals hide and seek" and "The trip of the little ship". In 2009, Ishikawa released five picture-books, "Baby smile", "Baby hello", "Tsumiki-kun", "Panda's ONIGIRI" and "Book of Eggs".

== Prize ==
- Kodansha Competition of Pictures for Kids grand prix (第9回 講談社童画グランプリで大賞受賞; Kōdansha Dōga Guranpuri Taishō Jushō) (1986)
- Bologna Illustrators Exhibition of Children's Books Selected (ボローニャ国際絵本原画展入選; Boronya Kokusai Ehon Gengaten Nyūsen) (2004)
- Bookmaking binding contest Prize of chief director of Japan Book Publishers Association winning (造本装幀コンクール日本書籍出版協会理事長賞受賞; Zōhon Sōtei Konkūru Nihon Syoseki Syuppan Rijichō shō Jushō) (2010)

== Books ==
- Patterned Birds Hide and Seek (とりのもようでかくれんぼ; (Tori no Moyōde Kakurenbo) (2013)
- This is Mask (おめんです; (Omendesu) (2013)
- Sea Creatures Hide and Seek (うみのいきものかくれんぼ; (Umino Ikimono Kakurenbo) (2012)
- Toy-block Boy and Toy-block Girl (つみきくんとつみきちゃん; (Tsumikikun To Tsumikichan) (2011)
- Colorful Vegetables Hide and Seek (やさいいろいろかくれんぼ; (Yasai Iroiro Kakurenbo) (2011)
- Everyone Can Fly! (みんな とぶよ！; (Minna Tobuyo!) (2010)
- Flowers Bloom (はなのさくえほん; (Hana No Saku Ehon) (2010)
- BABY HUGGY (あかちゃんだっこ; (Akachan Dakko) (2010)
- Book of Eggs (たまごのえほん; (Tamago No Ehon) (2009)
- Panda's ONIGIRI (パンダくんのおにぎり; (Pandakun No Onigiri) (2009)
- Toy-block Boy (つみきくん; (Tsumikikun) (2009)
- BABY SMILE (あかちゃんにこにこ; (Akachan NIkoniko) (2009)
- BABY HELLO (あかちゃんはーい; (Akachan Haai) (2009)
- Patterned Animals Hide and Seek (どうぶつもようでかくれんぼ; (Dōbutsu Moyōde Kakurenbo) (2008)
- Colorful Fruits Hide and Seek (くだものいろいろかくれんぼ; (Kudamono Iroiro Kakurenbo) (2008)
- The trip of the little ship (ふねくんのたび; (Funekun no Tabi) (2008)
- Où sont les animaux ? (Hiding Animals) (2008)
- Où sont les véhicules ? (Hiding Vehicles) (2008)
- Où sont les jouets ? (Hiding Toys) (2008)
- Où sont les habits ? (Hiding Clothes) (2008)
- Whose Tail? (このしっぽだあれ？; (Kono Shippo Dāre?) (2007)
- What is this sound? (このおとなにかな？; (Kono Oto Nanikana?) (2007)
- Colorful Animals Hide and Seek (どうぶついろいろかくれんぼ; (Dōbutsu Iroiro Kakurenbo) (2006)
- Colorful Vehicles Hide and Seek (のりものいろいろかくれんぼ; (Norimono Iroiro Kakurenbo) (2006)
- Happy Toys Hide and Seek (たのしいおもちゃかくれんぼ; (Tanoshii Omocha Kakurenbo) (2006)
- Colorful Clothes Hide and Seek (おきがえいろいろかくれんぼ; (Okigae Iroiro Kakurenbo) (2006)
- Paper Dogs travel around the world (世界を旅するペーパーわんこ; (Sekai wo Tabisuru Pēpāwanko) (2005)
- Life with Paper Dogs (ペーパーわんこのいるくらし; (Pēpāwanko no iru kurashi) (2003)
- Living with 100 Dogs (100ぴきのいぬがかえる本; (Hyappikino inu ga kaeru hon) (2002)
- Happy Painter Life (ハッピーペインターライフ; (Happī peintā raifu) (2000)
