= Junko Mori =

Japanese artist and metalworker

Propagation Project, forged steel sculpture by Junko Mori, 2006, Honolulu Museum of Art

Junko Mori (森 順子, Mori Junko) (born 1974) is a Japanese artist based in Wales. Working primarily in metalwork sculpture, Mori’s works are aggregate pieces usually connected thematically and visually to her observations of living matter, particularly plants. Her choice of metal varies widely from silver to mild steel, as does the size and scale of her works, which range from smaller tabletop pieces to largescale sculptures. Her distinctive style is one of contrasts and blending, drawing on her metalworking and sculptural education in both Japan and the UK, as well as constantly blurring the boundaries between so-called 'fine art' and craft. She has been described as "one of the most innovative and exciting Japanese metal artists working today," and has exhibited widely internationally throughout the past several decades. Her work can be found in the collections around the world, including the British Museum, the Victoria & Albert Museum, Manchester Art Gallery and the Honolulu Museum of Art.

== Early life and education ==
Mori was born in 1974 in Yokohama. Her mother was a school nurse, and her father worked as a mechanical engineer who designed video recording devices. Growing up, Mori has stated that both of her parents’ professions had a profound impact on her own interests: her mother’s interest in the natural sciences drew her to botany, and she would regularly help her father with repairs and little projects around the house. Mori has stated that, for as long as she can remember, she was obsessed with making and creating things, looking for tools and artistic materials with which to create; at eight years old, for example, she says that she asked Santa Claus for a jigsaw.

Mori claims that she was never particularly academically inclined, and that her interest in art and making things continued through secondary school. This interest led her to the Musashino Art University in Tokyo, where she received her B.A. in Industrial, Interior and Craft Design/Metalwork in 1997. However, after her completing her first degree, she felt like she was not fully accepted into either the fine arts or industrial arts spheres in Japan as her work fell between these two areas. She ultimately took some time off of study to spend a year working on welding.

A former professor eventually introduced her to a silversmith who had studied at Camberwell College of Arts. Though she didn’t speak any English at the time, Mori has said she was immediately attracted to their metalworking course. She found the difference between the Japanese and British education systems highly intriguing, stating that the latter allowed her to cultivate a more process-based approach. She received her B.A. in Silversmithing and Metalworking from Camberwell in 2000. She then spent two years as artist-in-residence at Liverpool Hope University. In 2005 she was among the eight metalworkers short-listed for the Jerwood Applied Arts Prize in metal.

== Work and holdings ==
Mori makes complex sculptures of hand-forged steel or silver. While at Musashino, she originally found metal to be the most difficult medium to work with, but it was also this very challenge that drew her to metalworking again and again. These decades of effort have resulted in dynamic pieces that showcase the plasticity of metal and appear almost as alive as the plant matter from which they draw their imagery.

She has stated that she does not usually plan her pieces individually beforehand; they take shape through her creative process. However, she does create drawings and sketches that help facilitate this process, though they are almost never indicative of the form that her final sculptures will take. On the artist's website, there is a "Research" page that features a collection of these drawings, which range from monochromatic botanical drawings to vivid multicolor depictions of plant matter with surrealist elements. Mori compares this drawing process to "jogging" before going on a more intense run; drawing warms up her mind, gets the wheels turning, and places her into the proper headset to begin work on her three-dimensional pieces. Once she begins working the metal, Mori has stated that the meditative process of repetition can cause her mind to go a bit blank so that she loses track of the time, but eventually, "the artwork tells her when it is finished." At a certain point, she steps back, looks at the piece, and realizes that it is complete.

“I am always drawn to visual impact of an aggregate assembled with many small components,” states Mori on her website. “I find infinite possibilities of the form multiplied by the vital power beyond the physical space, such as cell division through a microscope.” While the individual components of her sculptures may look similar to one another from a distance, the nature of the metal medium and forging process allows for subtle variations between these small components, creating an aggregate form even more complex than it first appears. Mori describes these variations as “repeating little accidents, like the mutation of cells,” alleging that “the final accumulation of units emerges within the process of evolution.” “The uncontrollable beauty,” she says, “is the core of my concept.”

Mori's work can be found in a number of public collections around the world, including:

- The British Museum
- The Honolulu Museum of Art
- The Victoria and Albert Museum
- The Art Gallery of South Australia in Adelaide
- Birmingham Museum and Art Gallery
- Manchester Art Gallery
- Museum für Kunst und Gewerbe Hamburg
- The National Museum Cardiff
- The National Museum of Scotland in Edinburgh
- National Museums Liverpool
- The Ulster Museum.

== Personal life ==
Mori first met her husband, a woodworker, at an arts event in Manchester. Her first studio was also in Manchester, but eventually the couple sought more studio space. Mori used to travel to Wales for surfing and bodyboarding, and enjoyed the country for its access to the sea, beach, and mountains. These attractions, combined with the affordable housing options, prompted the couple to purchase a house there. Mori’s current metalworking studio was converted from a pig shed, and her husband’s woodworking studio from the old horse shed. They have two children.

== Awards and achievements ==
- 2001 - NEXT MOVE, supported by Crafts Council and North West Arts Board, Artist Residency at Liverpool Hope University
- 2002 - The International Handwerksmesse, Munich, Germany
- 2002 - Gold Medal, Bavarian State Award at TALANTE
- 2003 - Crafts Council Business Development Award
- 2005 - Shortlist, Jerwood Applied Arts Prize 2005: Metal, Jerwood Foundation
- 2009 - Second Prize, Schoonhoven Silver Award, The Netherlands
- 2019 - Finalist, Loewe Craft Prize, Design Museum, London

== Selected exhibitions ==
=== Solo exhibitions ===
- 2005 - Junko Mori, 21st Century Showcase, Manchester Art Gallery, Manchester
- 2006 - Junko Mori, Bluecoat Display Centre, Liverpool
- 2013 - Junko Mori: Coppiced Wood, The Holburne Museum, Bath in association with Adrian Sassoon
- 2018 - Collect: Visiting Nature Junko Mori Metalwork, JamFactory, Adelaide, Australia in association with Adrian Sassoon

=== Group exhibitions ===
- 2005 - Jerwood Applied Arts Prize 2005: Metal, Crafts Council, London & UK tour
- 2009 - Can Art Save Us? Museums Sheffield; Millennium Gallery, Sheffield
- 2014 - Out of Sight: Drawing in the Lives of Makers, Contemporary Applied Arts, London
- 2017 - The International Hokuriku Kogei Summit – Worlds Kogei, Toyama Prefectural Museum of Art and Design, Toyama, Japan
- 2022 - Japanese Contemporary Design, National Museum of Scotland, Edinburgh
