= Światopełk Karpiński =

Polish poet and satirist (1909–1940)

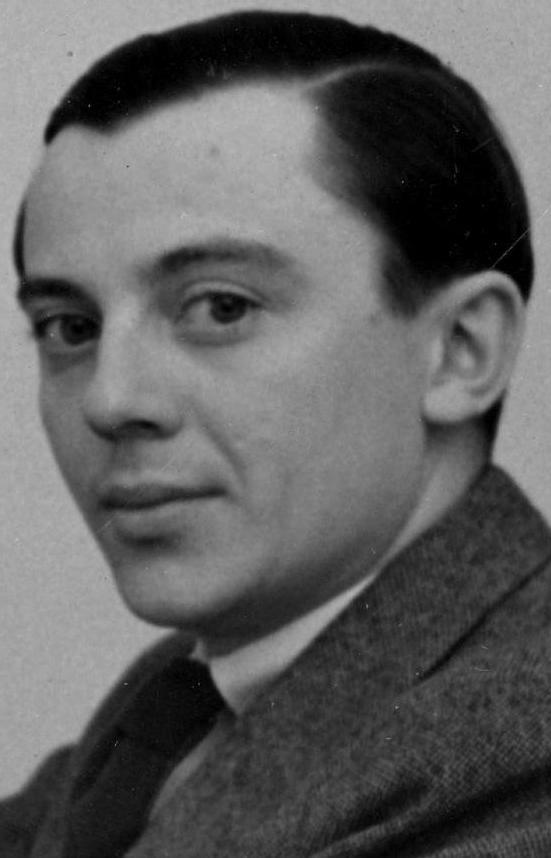
Światopełk Karpiński

Światopełk Karpiński (27 March 1909 in Łask – 21 April 1940 in Vilnius) was a Polish poet and satirist, brother of architect Zbigniew Karpiński, uncle of the writer and historian of ideas Wojciech Karpiński. He graduated from the School of Political Sciences in Warsaw where he was trained as a diplomat. But instead of following a diplomatic career he started collaborating with various Polish newspapers and journals, among them Szpilki and Cyrulik Warszawski. For his collection of poems Trzynaście wierszy he was awarded the main prize for the youth of the Polish Academy of Literature.

Conscripted prior to the outbreak of World War II, he fought in the Defence of Warsaw. He evaded capture by the German forces and managed to escape to Vilnius, which was under Lithuanian control, where he collaborated with various cabarets. He died under mysterious circumstances on 21 April 1940.
