= Tetsuo Araki =

Japanese artist

- Born: June 1, 1937
- Died: 1984 (aged 46–47)

Tetsuo Araki (荒木 哲夫; 1937–1984) was a 20th-century Japanese print artist. He worked mostly with aquatints and etchings. Original prints are sold at around US$500. He was born in Tokyo, Japan where he studied at the Musashino Art University. Eventually, he moved to a studio in Paris to continue his work.

== Works ==
A few known Araki prints are:

- Composition, 1960
- Le Reve D'hiver, 1971
- Untitled II, 1962
