= Fabrizio Clerici =

Italian painter (1913–1993)

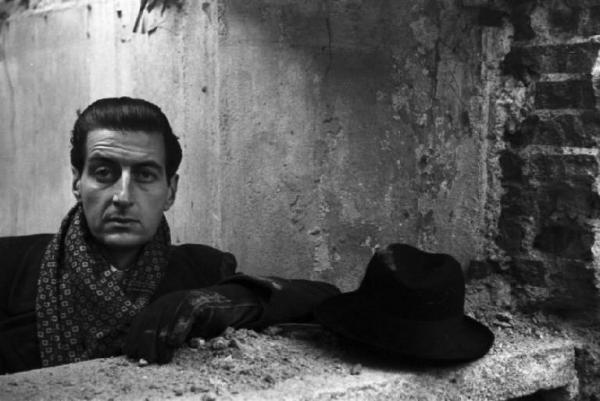
Fabrizio Clerici in 1946

Fabrizio Clerici (15 May 1913 – 7 June 1993) was an Italian painter.

== Biography ==
Clerici was a complex and eclectic artist and was also an architect, costume designer, scenographer and photographer. His works were exhibited in many museums in the United States, including the MoMA and the Guggenheim Museum, and in France, such as the Centre Pompidou.

His most renowned works are Il Minotauro accusa pubblicamente sua madre, Sonno romano (1955); Le Confessioni palermitane (1954); Minerva phlegraea (1956–57); Le Krak des Chevaliers (1968).

In 1920, Clerici moved to Rome, where he studied at the Scuola Superiore di Architettura and obtained an architecture degree in 1937. The Roman monuments, architecture and paintings from the Italian Renaissance and the baroque period considerably influenced him, as did certain religious works, due to their spectacular aspect. Later, Sonno romano (1955) would reawaken those memories. In Rome, he attended conferences by Le Corbusier, and in 1936, he became a friend of Alberto Savinio; they admired each other's work. In 1938 he met Giorgio de Chirico in Milan. At the end of the 1930s, he made his first dreamlike and fantastic paintings, based on his memory of events, locations and persons transformed by the filter of time. Through his reconstruction of images, Clerici evolved naturally towards surrealism. However, the actual motive of Clerici remained metaphysical.

Upon his return to Rome after the Second World War, he closely perused the scientific studies of Athanasius Kircher, Erhard Schön and Jean François Niceron. In 1944, he wrote an article in the review Quadrante describing his meeting with Leonor Fini. In January 1945, he and Savinio participated in a collective exhibition. In 1947, he collaborated with Lucio Fontana in the project Patio per una casa al mare, for Handicraft Development, Inc. in New York. Until 1948, Clerici continued to produce drawings and engravings; in 1949, he produced large-scale paintings in which architecture was the major harmonic component. Later, he travelled to the Middle East – Egypt, Syria and Jordan – as well as to Libya and Turkey. From those travels, Clerici developed two themes: the "mirages" and the "temples of the egg", cycles of constructions set in the desert and spiralling from a central core containing a hypothetical primordial egg.

In parallel to his paintings, which became more and more fantastic and magical, he worked for the theatre. On this return from Egypt, he created sets for La vedova scaltra by Carlo Goldoni under the direction of Giorgio Strehler. Before that, he had produced the sets of a number of ballets and lyric works, always with the theme of a fantastic world.

He then made the sets and costumes for Igor Stravinsky's ballet Orpheus, presented at the La Fenice theatre in Venice in 1948; for Dido and Aeneas by Henry Purcell and for The Rape of Lucretia by Benjamin Britten, both at the Teatro dell'Opera di Roma and directed by Alberto Lattuada (1949); for Armide by Jean-Baptiste Lully (1950); for the comic opera Gianni Schicchi by Giacomo Puccini, directed by Peter Ustinov at the Royal Opera House in Covent Garden (1962); and for Ali Baba by Luigi Cherubini, at the La Scala in Milan.

Over a two-year period, he helped create the big stained glass window La fede di Santa Caterina for the Basilica of San Domenico in Siena (1957).

In 1964, he began a series of tables for Orlando furioso of Ludovico Ariosto. In 1968, on the occasion of the Berliner Festspiele, he participated in two exhibitions on painting and scenography in the Neue Nationalgalerie and the Galerie im Rathaus Tempelhof.

In 1970, he produced for Berlin's Propyläen Verlag an edition of The Travels of Marco Polo (Il Milione) of Marco Polo, with tables and original lithographs. The drawings were exhibited with other paintings at the Galerie Brusberg in Hanover (1971). In 1974-75, he painted a cycle around the theme Isle of the Dead of Arnold Böcklin.

In 1977, he made a series of lithographs for an edition of Le bestiaire by Guillaume Apollinaire. During the same year, three important retrospective exhibitions were dedicated to Clerici at the Museum of Western and Oriental Art in Kiev, the Fine Arts Museum in Almaty and the Pushkin Museum in Moscow. In the 1970s, he produced Egyptian-inspired works entitled Variazioni tebane. In 1980–1981, he completed a cycle of paintings around the theme of violence, entitled I corpi di Orvieto. At the same time, he worked on a series of large colour tables entitled Le impalcature della Sistina.

In 1983, an exhibition was dedicated to him at the Palazzo dei Diamanti in Ferrara. In 1984, he visited Samarkand and Bukhara. In 1987, a retrospective exhibition was dedicated to him at the Reggia di Caserta, with a catalogue edited by Franco Maria Ricci.

After his death, the Archivio "Fabrizio Clerici" was created.

== Bibliography ==
- Giuseppe Bergamini, Giancarlo Pauletto. Fabrizio Clerici: opere 1938–1990. Pordenone: Centro Iniziative Culturali, Collana Protagonisti, 2006, 128 pp. ISBN 88-8426-023-X
- Raffaele Carrieri. Fabrizio Clerici. Milan: Electra Editrice, 1955.
- Marcel Brion. Fabrizio Clerici. Milan: Electra Editrice, 1955, 122 pp.
- Sergio Troisi (ed.). Fabrizio Clerici. Opere 1937–1992. Catalogo della mostra (Marsala, 7 luglio-28 ottobre 2007). Palermo: Sellerio Editore, 2007, 207 pp., ISBN 88-768-1164-8
