= Sakiko Yamaoka =

Japanese performance artist

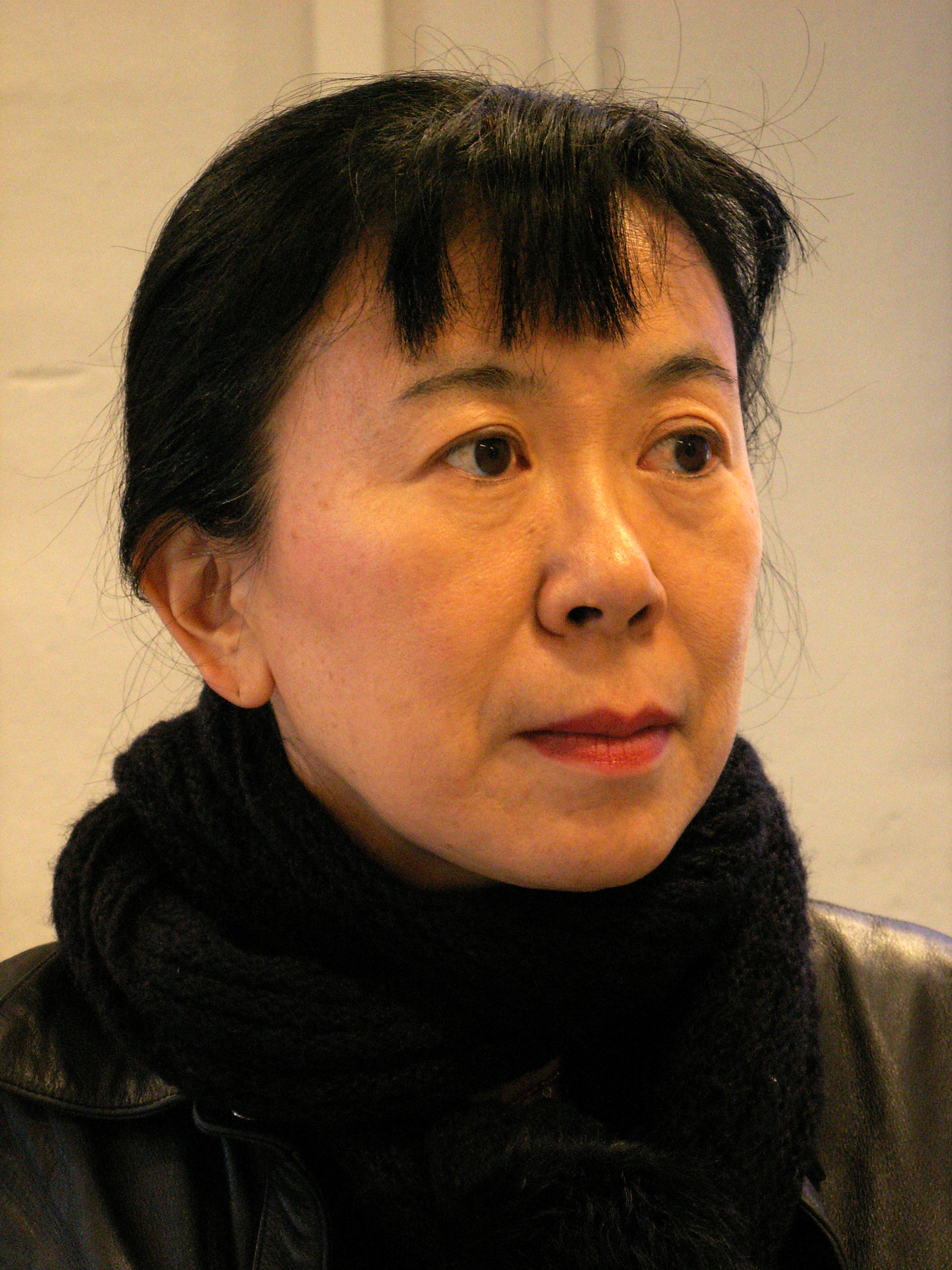
- Sakiko Yamaoka (2014)
- Born: 1961 (age 64–65); Japan
- Occupation: Performance artist

Sakiko Yamaoka (山岡 さ希子; born 1961) is a Japanese performance artist from Tokyo, Japan. Since the early 1990s, she has staged performances in various cities across Asia, Europe, and both Americas. In 2009, Yamaoka appeared in the film Phenomenology of Truth.

== Life and career ==
In 1984, Yamaoka graduated from Musashino Art University, a private university in Kodaira, Western Tokyo where she studied oil painting. In 1991 she became interested in performance as an art form. Since then her work has encompassed performance, video, photography, and installation.

In her performance art, Yamaoaka focuses on how we see objects and things, and on human boundaries. She has said, "I define my artworks as sculptures depicting action and time and relationship between artist and audience, artist and materials, in which I attempt to create an example of the human condition."

Since the early 1990s, Yamaoka has staged performance exhibitions in Japan and abroad at art festivals and other events as well as in urban environments. Among the cities where she has returned several times with different exhibitions are her home city of Tokyo, Singapore, Jerusalem, Stockholm, Essen, Boston, Toronto and Warsaw. In 2014 she took part in the performance "Friktioner" in Uppsala, Sweden, and later that year she returned to Sweden for an exhibition in Malmö.

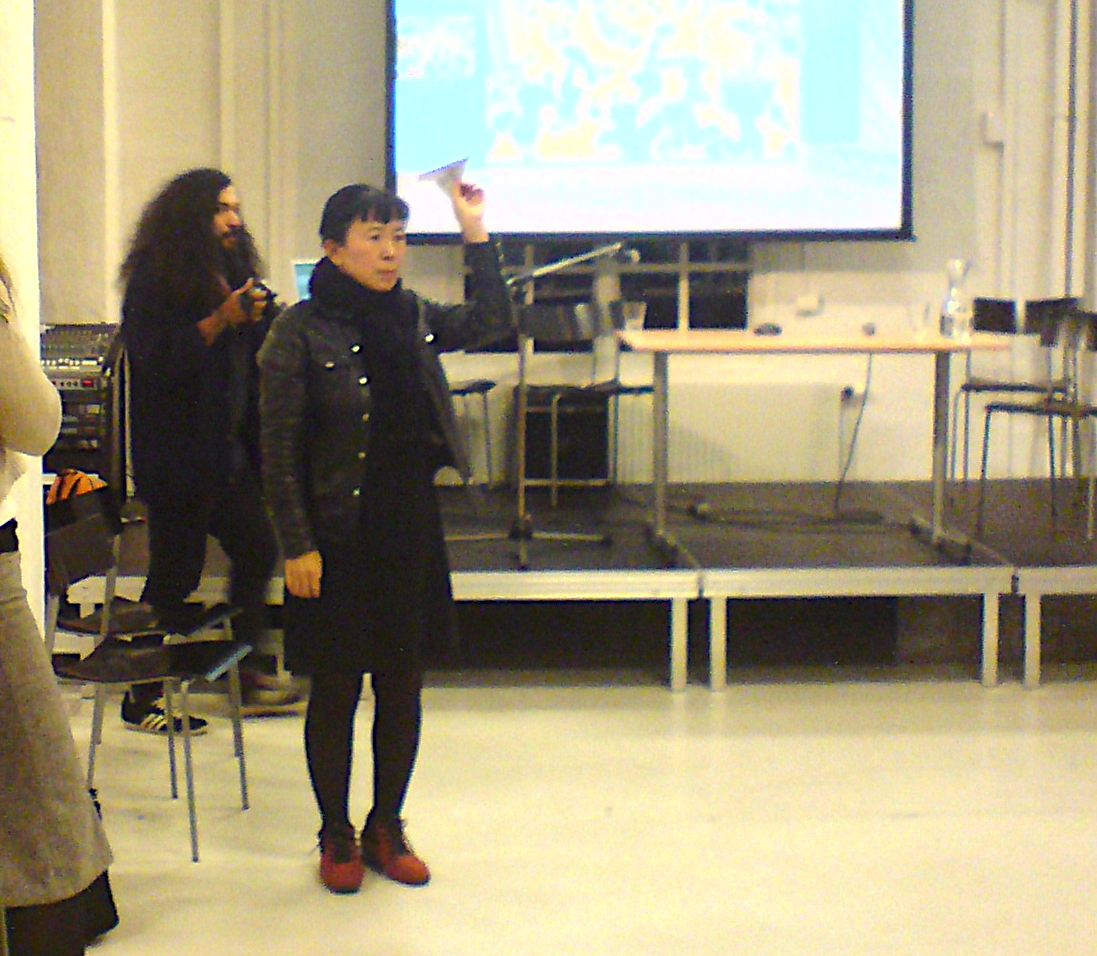
Yamaoka, in performance

In the 29-minute-long film Phenomenology of Truth, she portrays a Japanese artist who one day gets to meet a Warsaw philosopher - whom she has admired at a distance.

== Work ==
=== Performance ===
- More Plates (Tokyo/Singapore 1992)
- Tokyo Dragon Tornade Project (1993–96)
- Stand and Fall (Warsaw/Bytom, 1997–99)
- Minimal Fighting (Tokyo 1999–2003)
- Garden (Essen/Prague/Saitama/Minsk, 2002–04)
- Listen (Cologne 2003)
- Handmill (Singapore/Manila/Boston/Essen/Dresden 2004–07)
- Drill (Helsinki 2006, Glasgow 2007, Tokyo 2009)
- Missing in Yokohama (2007–08)
- Best Place to Sleep (Tokyo/Warsaw/Boston/Zagreb/Tokyo, 2007–12)
- Wind on a castle (Chiang Mai 2007, Warsaw 2008)
- We are Elegant (Yogyakarta 2007, Jerusalem 2011, Vancouver 2011)
- Wind from Sky (Human being is Plant) (Toronto 2008)
- Come with Me (Tokyo/Toronto, 2008–09)
- Blind Game (Tokyo/Jerusalem/Girona/Stockholm/Rotterdam, 2009–12)
- Angels are Watching (Akihabara and Tokyo, 2010)
- Love or Not (Tokyo/Jerusalem, 2010/2011)
- Boil Me (Gyōda/Valencia, 2011)
- Refugee for Feets (Jerusalem/Tokyo, 2011) (workshop)
- Targeting Zigzag (Tokyo 2012)
- Left to us (Stockholm 2012)
- Invisible Experience, Unorganized Bodies (Saitama triennale 2020, Omiya, Saitama)

=== Filmography ===
- 2009 – Phenomenology of Truth, 29 min.
