= Jōsaku Maeda =

Japanese painter and printmaker (1926–2007)

- 前田常作
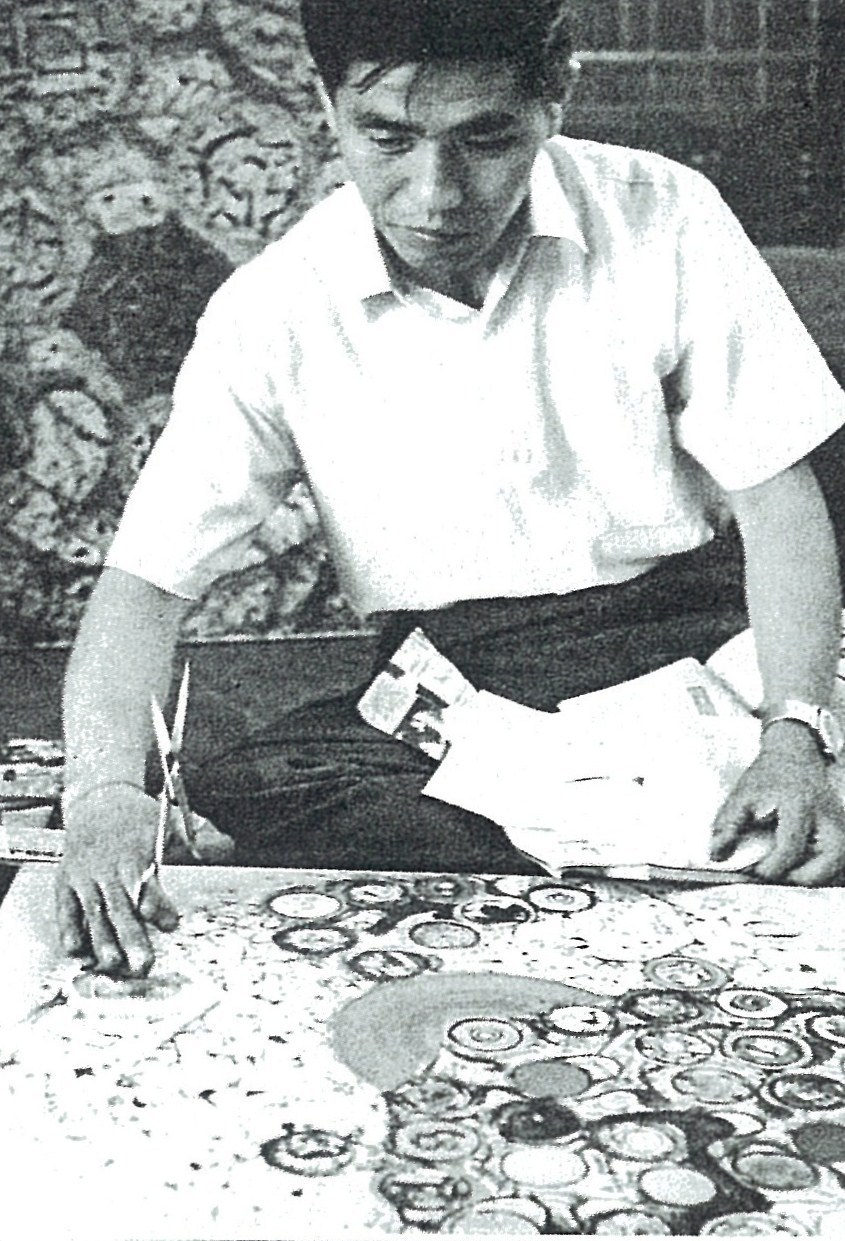
- Maeda at work in 1963
- Born: 14 July 1926; Nyūzen, Toyama, Japan
- Died: 13 October 2007 (aged 81); Osaka, Japan
- Education: Musashino Art School
- Known for: Painting, lithography, mandala
- Notable work: Saigoku Pilgrimage (1988); Bandō Pilgrimage; Chichibu Pilgrimage; Ningen Tanjō (Human Birth); Meisō Mandara-zu (Meditation Mandala)
- Movement: Art Informel, Surrealism
- Awards: Medal with Purple Ribbon (1992); Order of the Sacred Treasure (2000)

Jōsaku Maeda (前田常作, Maeda Jōsaku, 14 July 1926 – 13 October 2007) was a Japanese painter and printmaker known for abstract paintings based on Buddhist mandala structures.

== Early life and career ==
Drafted into the Imperial Japanese Army in 1945, Maeda witnessed the Toyama air raid, an experience he later described as shaping his meditation on life and death.

Maeda graduated from Musashino Art School in 1953. He associated with avant-garde artists including Tatsuo Ikeda and On Kawara at the Seisakusha Kondankai. His first solo exhibition was held at Takemiya Gallery in 1955 on the recommendation of Shūzō Takiguchi. He won the Grand Prize at the first International Young Artists Exhibition in 1957.

Living in Paris from 1958 to 1962 on a Congress for Cultural Freedom scholarship, in 1959 Polish-French critic Konstanty Jeleński described his Night Series works as "mandala", after which Maeda began to consciously incorporate mandala themes into his work. He subsequently studied esoteric Buddhist iconography at the Musée Guimet. His 1962 painting Ningen Seiza (Constellation Humaine) was created during this period. He received the Museum of Modern Art, Tokyo Prize at the 6th Japan International Art Exhibition in 1961.

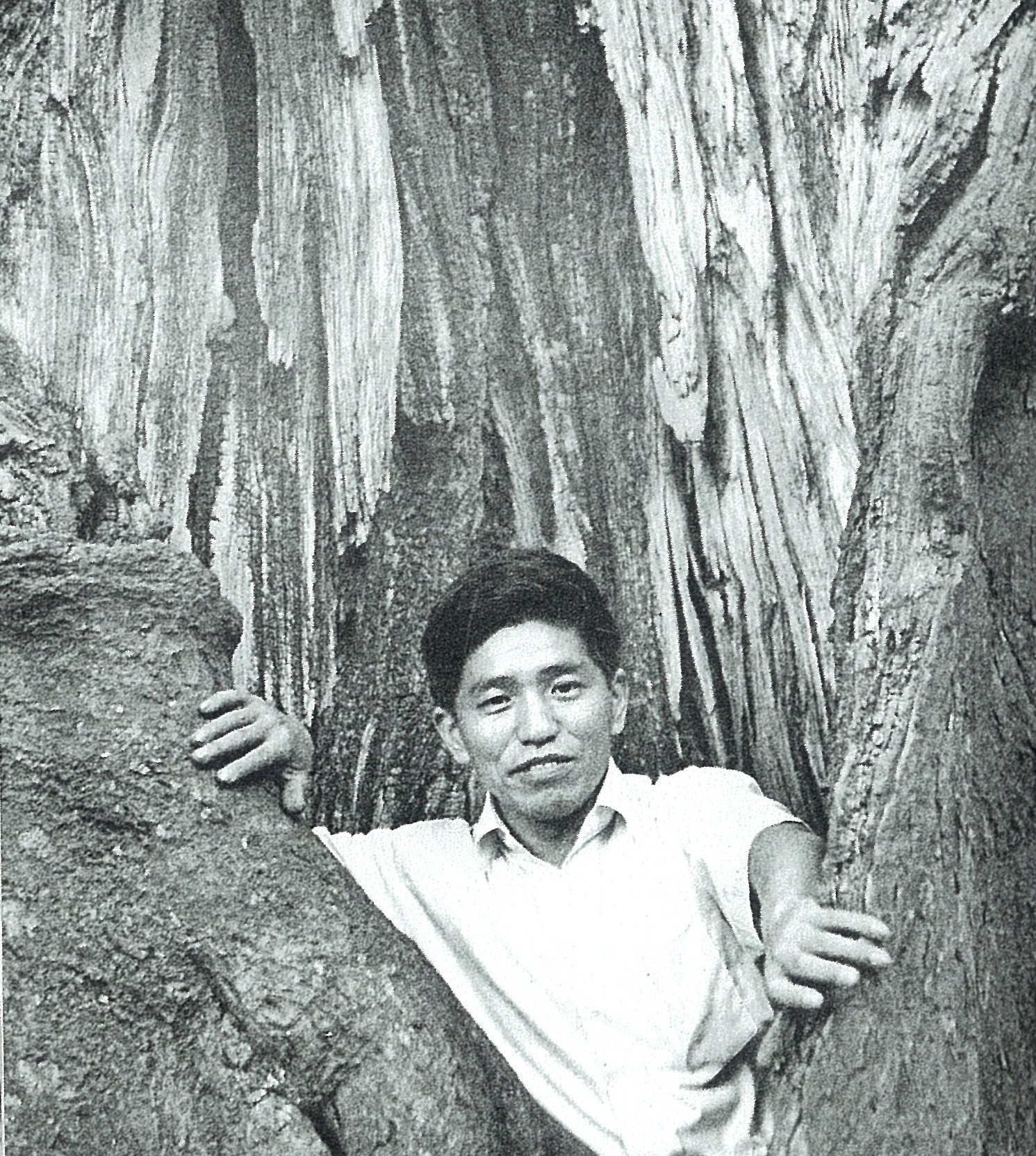
Maeda in 1963, the year he returned from Paris

In 1963 he returned temporarily to Japan and was deeply moved by the 9th-century Ryōkai Mandala at Tō-ji temple.

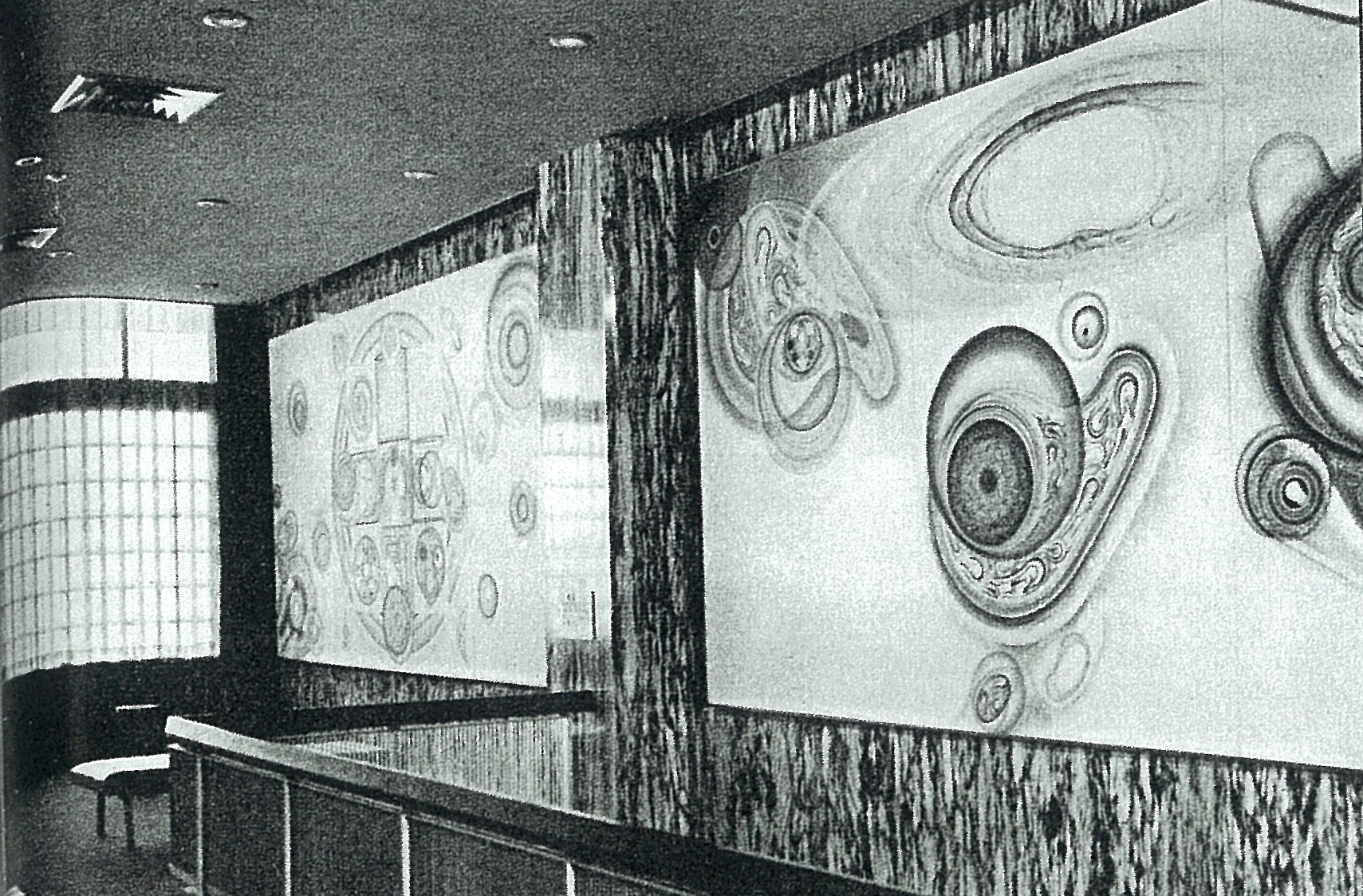
Maeda's wall painting at the Nagaoka Contemporary Art Museum, 1964

After travels in India and Nepal in 1970, he deepened his study of reincarnation and began the Meditation Mandala series.

In 1977 he traveled to Nepal, India, Sri Lanka and China as a delegate of the Japan Artists Association, and began the Kansō Mandara-zu series upon his return. In 1979 he received the 11th Japan Art Grand Prize for his mandala research and began the Japan 100 Kannon pilgrimage project.

== Early abstraction and cellular forms ==
Maeda's early Human Map (Ningen chizu) series of the mid-1950s has been described by curators at the Museum of Modern Art as paintings "covered by cell-like shapes so densely packed they seem almost to be proliferating". His 1959 painting Garden of Earthly Delights (Kairaku no sono), held by the Takamatsu City Museum of Art, was noted in the same catalogue for its "humanoid form in innumerable repetitions... swirling toward a central void", a treatment compared to the contemporary work of Yayoi Kusama.

Art historian Doryun Chong places Maeda alongside Natsuyuki Nakanishi as a key figure in the shift from Art Informel toward structured abstraction in post-war Japan.

Maeda served as professor at Kyoto City University of Arts (1979–1983) and as professor and president of Musashino Art University from 1994. He was awarded the Medal with Purple Ribbon in 1992 and the Order of the Sacred Treasure in 2000.

His work was included in the Museum of Modern Art's 2012 exhibition Tokyo 1955–1970: A New Avant-Garde. His work is in the collection of the Museum of Modern Art in New York and the National Gallery of Art in Washington, D.C.
