= Leonor Fini =

Argentine-Italian artist (1907–1996)

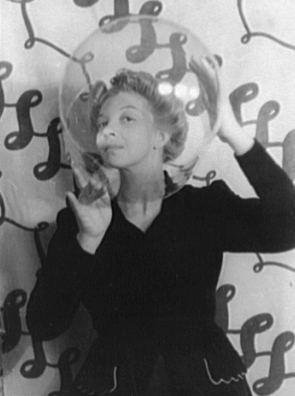
- Leonor Fini, 1936
- Born: 30 August 1907; Buenos Aires, Argentina
- Died: 18 January 1996 (aged 88); Paris, France
- Known for: Painting; Illustration; Writing
- Movement: Surrealism

Leonor Fini (30 August 1907 – 18 January 1996) was an Argentine-Italian surrealist painter, designer, illustrator, and author, known for her depictions of powerful and erotic women.

== Early life ==
Fini was born in Buenos Aires, Argentina, to Malvina Braun Dubich (born in Trieste, with German, Slavic and Venetian ancestry) and Herminio Fini (with ancestry from Benevento, Italy). Herminio was a handsome and very wealthy man, but also tyrannical with extreme religious views. Within 18 months of Leonor's birth, Malvina fled back to Trieste with the child. Leonor was raised there and was expelled from various schools for being rebellious. As a Catholic, Herminio refused to give Malvina a divorce, which was only granted to her in 1919 through an Italian court. Custody battles often forced Fini and her mother to take sudden flight and wear disguises. In her early teens, an eye disease forced Fini to wear bandages on both eyes. After recovering, she decided to become an artist.

She moved to Milan at the age of 17 and a gallery in Trieste exhibited one of her paintings that year. She thereafter received a commission to paint portraits from dignitaries in Milan where she had her first one-woman show at the Galerie Barbaroux in 1929. She moved to Paris in 1931 when she was 24. There, she became acquainted with Carlo Carrà and Giorgio de Chirico, whose metaphysical style of art influenced much of her work. She also came to know Paul Éluard, Max Ernst, Georges Bataille, Henri Cartier-Bresson, Picasso, André Pieyre de Mandiargues, and Salvador Dalí. Fini traveled Europe by car with Mandiargues and Cartier-Bresson where Cartier-Bresson took a photograph, one of his best known, of her naked in a pool with a shaved pubis. The photograph of Fini sold in 2007 for $305,000 – the highest price paid at auction for one of Cartier-Bresson's works to that date.

== Career ==
Many of Fini's paintings featured women in positions of power or in very sexualised contexts. Here, the woman is clothed and in the lead, while the male's body is quite visible.

Fini had no formal artistic training, but grew up surrounded by the Renaissance and Mannerist styles of Italy.

Her first major exhibition was in 1936 at New York's Julian Levy Gallery. Though Fini is part of the pre-war generation of Parisian artists often overlooked in favour of male contemporaries, she was very important in the Surrealist movement. Fini never officially joined the movement, but she did show her work alongside Surrealist artists. She was included in Peggy Guggenheim's 1943 show Exhibition by 31 Women at the Art of This Century gallery in New York.

Fini worked for Elsa Schiaparelli in the late thirties and early forties and designed the bottle for the perfume "Shocking", basing the shape on Mae West's torso. Fini networked into theatre circles when she started taking on costume design projects in the 1930s as a source of extra income. She also illustrated books and some of her best-known works in this area are her drawings for a 1944 edition of the Marquis de Sade's "Juliette." Between 1944 and 1972, Fini’s main work was in costume design for film, theatre, ballet and opera including, famously, the first ballet performed by Roland Petit's Ballet de Paris, Les Demoiselles de la nuit, featuring a young Margot Fonteyn in 1948. In 1949, Frederick Ashton choreographed a ballet she had conceptualized, Le Rêve de Leonor ("Leonor's Dream"), with music by Benjamin Britten, and Fini designed the hybrid human-animal costumes for it as well. In 1959, Fini made a fairy tale-inspired painting called Les Sorcières for the Mexican actress, María Félix. She also designed the costumes for two films: Renato Castellani's Romeo and Juliet (1954) and John Huston's A Walk with Love and Death (1968). In London, she exhibited paintings at the Kaplan gallery in 1960 and at the Hanover Gallery in 1967. A 1986 retrospective at the Musée du Luxembourg in Paris featured over 260 of her works in a variety of media including watercolours and drawings, theatre/costume designs, paintings and masks. In the 1970s, she wrote three novels: Rogomelec, Moumour; Contes pour enfants velu and Oneiropompe. Madonna used the imagery of one of the exhibits, Le Bout du Monde, in her video, "Bedtime Story" in 1994. In the spring of 1987, Fini had an exhibition at London's Editions Graphique's gallery. The San Francisco Modern Museum of Art also featured her work in an exhibition entitled "Women, Surrealism, and Self-representation" in 1999.

Fini's work often included sphinxes, werewolves, and witches. Most of the characters in her art were female or androgynous.

She painted portraits of Jean Genet, Anna Magnani, Jacques Audiberti, Alida Valli, Jean Schlumberger and Suzanne Flon as well as many other celebrities and wealthy visitors to Paris. Her friends included Jean Cocteau, Giorgio de Chirico, and Alberto Moravia, Fabrizio Clerici and most of the other artists and writers inhabiting or visiting Paris.

Fini illustrated about 50 books, including ''Satyricon'' and works by Jean Genet and Charles Baudelaire. She illustrated many works of classic authors and poets, including Edgar Allan Poe, Charles Baudelaire and Shakespeare, as well as texts by new writers. Leonor Fini illustrated books by Lise Deharme, including Le Poids d’un oiseau in 1955 and Oh! Violette ou la Politesse des Végétaux in 1969. She was very generous with her illustrations and donated many drawings to writers to help them get published. She is, perhaps, best known for her graphic illustrations for the sexually explicit Histoire d'O.

== Personal life ==
Fini was openly bisexual and lived in a long-term polyamorous relationship. She told Whitney Chadwick in 1982: "I am a woman, therefore I have had the 'feminine experience', but I am not a lesbian". She also said: "Marriage never appealed to me, I've never lived with one person. Since I was 18, I've always preferred to live in a sort of community – a big house with my atelier and cats and friends, one with a man who was rather a lover and another who was rather a friend. And it has always worked."

Fini married once, for a brief period, to Federico Veneziani. They were divorced after she met the Italian count Stanislao Lepri, who abandoned his diplomatic career shortly after meeting Fini and lived with her thereafter. She met the Polish writer Konstanty Jeleński, known as Kot, in Rome in January 1952. She was delighted to discover that he was the illegitimate half-brother of Sforzino Sforza, who had been one of her favorite lovers. Kot joined Fini and Lepri in their Paris apartment in October 1952 and the three remained inseparable until their deaths. She later employed an assistant to join the household, which he described as "a little bit of prison and a lot of theatre". One of his jobs was to look after her beloved Persian cats. Over the years she acquired as many as 23 of them; they shared her bed and were allowed to roam the dining-table at mealtimes. The 'inner circle' expanded to include the American artist, Richard Overstreet the Argentine poet Juan-Bautista Pinero, and the Italian artist Eros Renzetti.

== Books in English translation ==
- Rogomelec (Paris, Stock, 1979). English translation by William Kulik and Serena Shanken Skwersky (Cambridge MA: Wakefield Press, 2020).

== Legacy ==
A biographical song about Leonor Fini's life, "Leonor", is featured on Welsh artist Katell Keineg's 1997 second album, Jet.

Leonor Fini Catalogue Raisonné of the Oil Paintings by Richard Overstreet and Neil Zukerman was published in 2021 by Scheidegger & Spiess, Zurich.

=== Retrospectives ===
- Pourquoi pas?, Bildmuseet, Umeå University, Sweden. January 31, 2014 – May 11, 2014
- Leonor Fini: Theatre of Desire, Museum of Sex, New York, U.S., curated by Lissa Rivera. September 28, 2018 – March 4, 2019

=== Filmography ===
- Leonor Fini, documentary by Chris Vermorcken (1987). Produced by Films Dulac and distributed by RM Associates.
- In 2018, Fini was the subject of a short documentary, Gloria's Call by Cheri Gaulke.
