= Gaston Errembault de Dudzeele (died 1929) =

(died 1929)

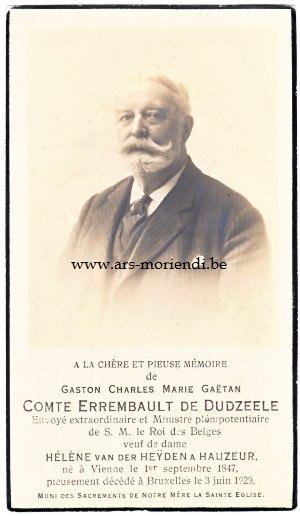
Count Gaston Errembault de Dudzeele (1847-1929)

Gaston-Charles-Marie-Gabriel-Raphaël-Gaëtan, comte Errembault de Dudzeele (Vienna 1 September 1847 – Ixelles 3 June 1929) was a Belgian nobleman and a diplomat.

== Biography ==
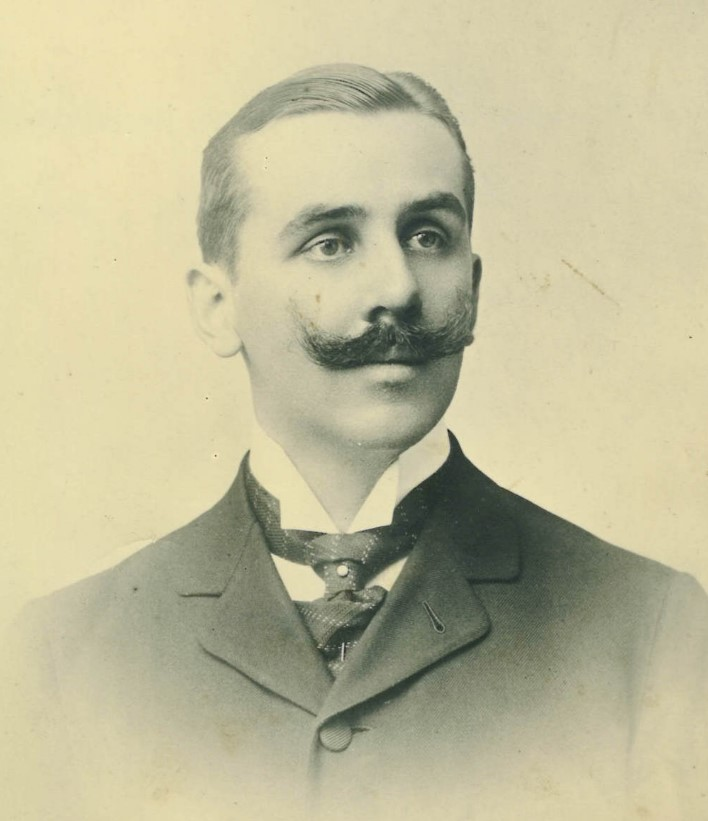
Gaston's son: Count Gaston Hugues Errembault de Dudzeele (1877–1961)

He served as Minister of the King of the Belgians to Serbia from 1890 to 1898, to the Ottoman Empire from 1898 to 1909 and to Austro-Hungary from 1909 to 1914. He was the son of Gaston Errembault de Dudzeele, also a Belgian diplomat, by his first wife, Austrian Countess Marie-Helene von Abensperg und Traun (1824-1899), the daughter of Count Johann Adam II von Abensperg und Traun (1761-1843) by his second wife, Baroness Maria Franziska von Mesnil (1787-1865). With his wife, Hélène Adélaïde Vanderheyden à Hauzeur (1849-1900), he had two children, Valentine Sforza (1875–1969), married to Count Carlo Sforza, Italian Minister of Foreign Affairs and Gaston Hugues, Count Errembault de Dudzeele (1877–1961), who married Natalija Konstantinović, maternal descendant of the Obrenović dynasty and former wife of Prince Mirko of Montenegro, brother-in-law of King Vittorio Emanuele III of Italy. Through his son, he is an ancestor of Carlyne Cerf de Dudzeele, a noted French stylist, art director and photographer.
