= Gaston Errembault de Dudzeele (died 1888) =

Belgian diplomat

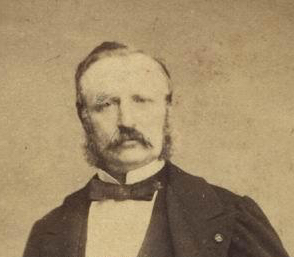

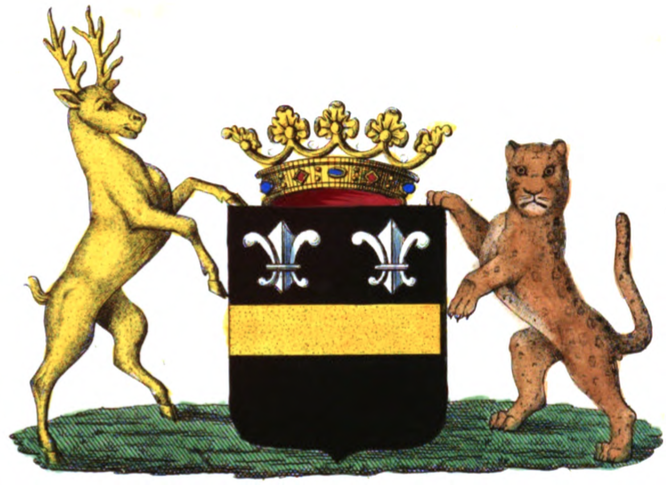
Coat of arms of the Errembault de Dudzeele family

Antoine Guillaume Joseph Gaston, comte Errembault de Dudzeele (Tournai, 16 October 1819 – St Petersburg, 6 February 1888) was a Belgian nobleman and a diplomat.

== Biography ==
Errembault served as Minister of the King of the Belgians to the Ottoman Empire and to the Kingdom of Greece from 1861 to 1867, and to the Russian Empire from 1867 until his death. On 10 October 1861 he signed a commercial treaty between the Kingdom of Belgium and the Sublime Porte.

By his wife, Countess Marie-Helene von Abensperg und Traun (1824–1899), daughter of Count Johann Adam II von Abensperg und Traun (1761–1843) and his wife, Maria Franziska von Mesnil (1787–1865), whom he married in Vienna on 17 September 1846, he had a son, Gaston, who also became a diplomat. The family of Errembault were established in Veurne in the eleventh century; Gaston's ancestor Louis Errembault de Dudzeele served as president of the Council of Flanders in 1668. His grandson, Gaston Count Errembault de Dudzeele (1877–1961), married Princess Natalija of Montenegro and had issue. Among his descendants is Carlyne Cerf de Dudzeele, a noted French stylist, art director and photographer.

== Honours ==
Errembault de Dudzeele was a knight in the Order of Leopold and in the Austrian Order of the Iron Crown, third class.
