= Konstanty Jeleński =

Polish essayist (1922–1987)

Konstanty Aleksander Jeleński (2 January 1922 – 4 May 1987) was a Polish essayist.

== Biography ==
Konstanty Aleksander Jeleński (in French: Constantin Jelenski) was born on 2 January 1922 in Warsaw, Poland. It was alleged that his biological father was Carlo Sforza. At the age of eighteen he left Poland to serve in the Polish Army in France. He lived the remainder of his life as an émigré, first in Italy for several years after the Second World War, then settling in Paris in 1951.

In Paris Jeleński was active in Polish émigré literary circles. He led the Eastern European division of the Congress for Cultural Freedom (after 1967, the International Association for Cultural Freedom) and was a prolific contributor to the Association's monthly publication Preuves and to Kultura, the Polish émigré literary journal. Beginning in 1975, he became increasingly active with the Institut national de l'audiovisuel.

Jeleński's criticism, translations and edited works addresses a wide range of literary, political and artistic topics, especially twentieth-century Polish literature and history. Among his most influential works are many critical essays about Witold Gombrowicz and the edited volume Anthologie de la poesie polonaise (1965). In 1959, while working for the Congress for Cultural Freedom in Paris, he described the Night Series paintings of Japanese artist Jōsaku Maeda as "mandala", a comment that led Maeda to consciously develop mandala-based abstraction.

From 1952 until the end of his life, Jeleński cohabited with Argentine painter Leonor Fini and with Fini's former partner Italian painter Stanislao Lepri in Paris in a relationship that has been described as a "triangle". Lepri was initially jealous of Jeleński, but the two eventually became friends. Both Jeleński and the other two were reported to be bisexual, and the relationship was said to be open, but Fini was probably the only woman Jeleński had relations with. He was known to continue engaging in fleeting relations with men while living with Eleonor, as he had before; indeed, in 1958, he wrote to his mother that his relationship with Eleonor had stopped being sexual several years before that. He revealed his homosexuality to his mother in the same letter. Jeleński died of AIDS on 4 May 1987 in Paris, France.
