= Cathy McGowan =

Cathy McGowan may refer to:

- Cathy McGowan (presenter) (born 1943), British broadcaster and journalist known for presenting Ready Steady Go!
- Cathy McGowan (politician) (born 1953), member of the Parliament of Australia representing the Division of Indi (2013–2019)
- Kathy McGowan, author associated with Evil Genius (book series)
