= Genii =

Genii (a plural form of genie) are supernatural creatures in early pre-Islamic Arabian and later Islamic mythology and theology.

Genii may also refer to:

- Genii (magazine), or The Conjurors' Magazine
- Genii (Stargate), fictional characters in the TV series
- Genii Capital, a Luxembourg-based investment firm
- Genius (mythology) (Latin, plural form also genii), the divine element of a person, place or thing in ancient Roman religion

== See also ==
- Genie (disambiguation)
- Genius (disambiguation)
- Temple of the Five Genii (disambiguation)
