= Evil genius =

Evil genius may refer to:

== Arts and entertainment ==
=== Music ===
- Evil Genius (album), by Gucci Mane, 2018
- The Evil Genius, a 2023 album by Mr Eazi
- "Evil Genius", a song by Ab-Soul from the 2016 album Do What Thou Wilt.
- "Evil Genius", a song by Pat Benatar from the 1981 album Precious Time

=== Literature ===
- Evil Genius (book series), a series of nonfiction books
- Evil Genius (novel), by Catherine Jinks, 2005
- Evil Geniuses: The Unmaking of America, a 2020 nonfiction book by Kurt Andersen
- Evil genius, a version of the mad scientist motif in fiction
- The Evil Genius, a novel by Wilkie Collins

=== Other ===
- Evil Genius (TV series), a 2018 true crime documentary series
  - Evil Genius (film), an upcoming film
- Evil Genius (video game), 2004
- Evil Genius, a BBC Radio 4 programme and podcast hosted by Russell Kane

== Other uses ==
- Evil demon, or evil genius, a concept in Cartesian philosophy
- Evil Geniuses, an esports organisation

== See also ==
- Evil (disambiguation)
- Genius (disambiguation)
- Crime boss, a person in charge of a criminal organization
- Supervillain, a stock character in superhero fiction
