= Genius (disambiguation) =

A genius is a person who has exceptional intellectual ability, creativity, or originality.

Genius may also refer to:

== Arts and entertainment ==
=== Film, television and radio ===
- The Genius (film), a 1948 Mexican comedy film
- Genius (1991 film), a Russian drama
- Genius (1999 film), a Disney Channel Original Movie
- Genius (2012 film), a Telugu film
- Genius (2016 film), a biographical drama about Max Perkins
- Genius (2018 Hindi film), an Indian action thriller
- Genius (2018 Tamil film), an Indian drama film
- Genius (radio series), a British comedy gameshow 2005–08
- Genius (British series), a TV version of the radio show 2009–10
- Genius (American TV series), an anthology period drama from 2017
- The Genius (TV series), a South Korean reality game show
- Genius by Stephen Hawking, a 2016 TV documentary series
- "Genius", a Series G episode of the television series QI (2010)

=== Literature ===
- Genius (literature), a concept in literary theory relating to inspiration
- The "Genius" (novel), by Theodore Dreiser, 1915
- The Genius, a 2008 novel by Jesse Kellerman
- Genius: A Mosaic of One Hundred Exemplary Creative Minds, a 2003 book by Harold Bloom
- "The Genius", a 1955 short story by Randall Garrett as Ivar Jorgensen
- "The Genius", a story by Donald Barthelme in his 1987 collection Forty Stories
- Genius: The Life and Science of Richard Feynman, a 1992 biography by James Gleick

=== Music ===
- Genius (Krizz Kaliko album), 2009
- Genius: The Best of Warren Zevon, a 2002 album
- "Genius" (LSD song), 2018
- "Genius" (Pitchshifter song), 1997
- "Genius", a 2021 song by Pop Smoke from the album Faith
- "Genious", a 1999 Gorillaz song released in 2021 as part of the super deluxe box set edition of Gorillaz (album)

=== Other uses in arts and entertainment ===
- Genius (comics), a Scottish newspaper cartoon series 1978–1983
- Geniu$: The Tech Tycoon Game, a 2005 computer game
- Genius, a fictional character in TV sitcom Herman's Head

== Businesses ==
- Genius Brands International, an American entertainment company
- Genius Products, or Genius Entertainment, a former American entertainment company
- Genius (company), an American digital media company
- Micro Genius, a brand name of Famicom clone consoles in several countries
- Genius mouse, a brand name of computer peripherals manufactured abroad by Taiwanese manufacturer KYE Systems
- TV Genius, a British software company
- Genius Bar, a tech support station in Apple's retail stores

== Mythology ==
- Genius (mythology), the divine element of a person, place or thing in ancient Roman religion
- Genius loci, the protective spirit of a place in ancient Roman religion
- The emperor's genius, an element of the ancient Roman Imperial cult
- The Minoan Genius, a legendary creature in Minoan and Mycanean mythology

== People ==
- The Genius, or GZA (Gary E. Grice (born 1967), an American rapper
- The Genius, a nickname of musician Ray Charles (1930–2004)
- The Genius, a ring name of wrestler Lanny Poffo

== Science and technology ==
- Genius (iTunes), an Apple software feature
- Genius (mathematics software), a numerical computing environment and programming language

== See also ==
- Genie (disambiguation)
- Genii (disambiguation)
- Evil genius (disambiguation)
- Mastermind (disambiguation)
- Gaon (Hebrew), literally 'genius'
- Geniusze, a village in Poland
- MacArthur Fellows Program, commonly known as a "Genius grant"
- GENIUS Act
