= Hoi Tong Monastery =

Buddhist temple and monastery in Guangzhou, China

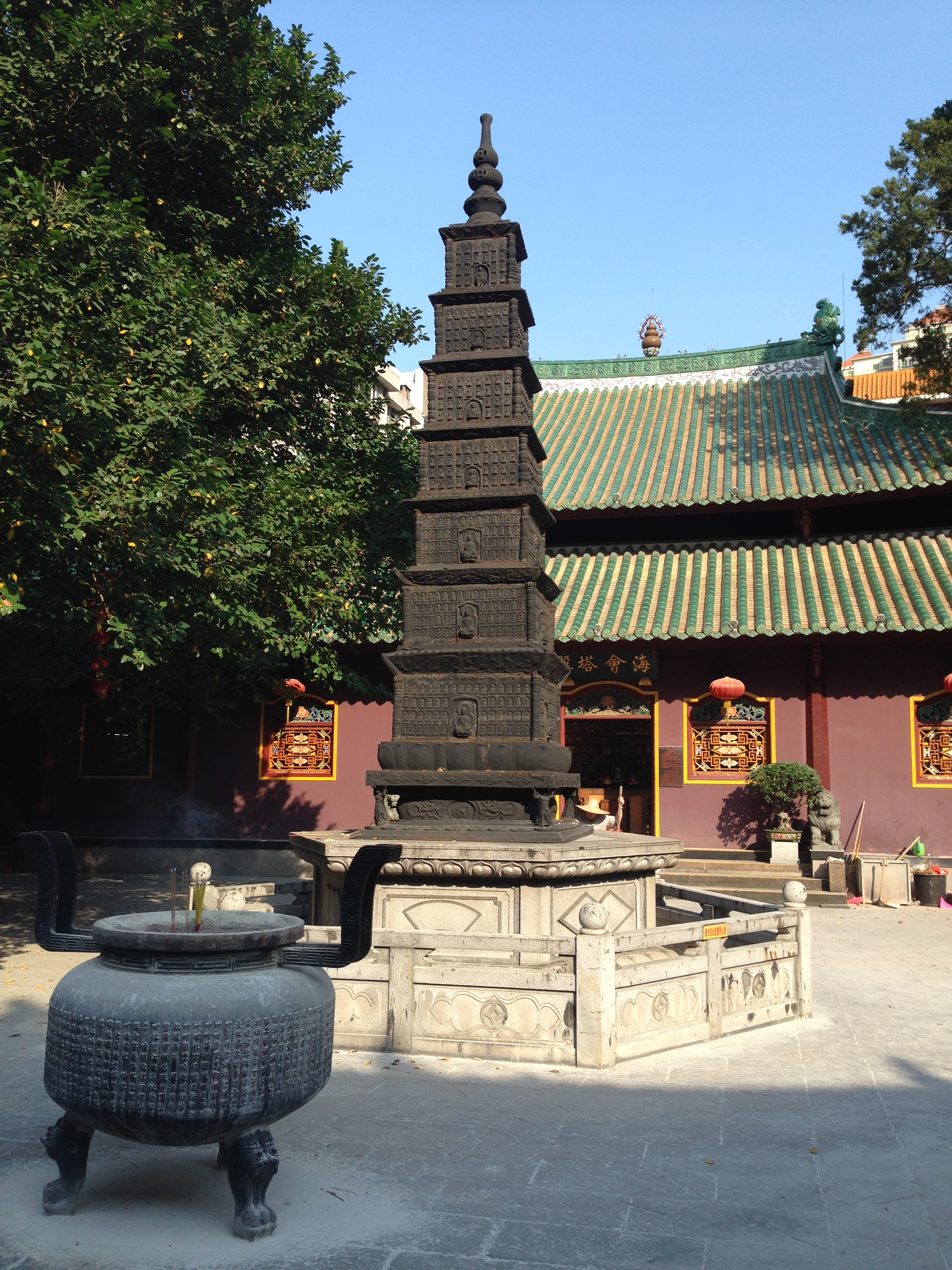
- The iron Thousand Buddha Tower in the monastery's courtyard
- Interactive map of Hoi Tong Monastery

Site
- Location: Guangzhou, China
- Coordinates: 23°06′28″N 113°15′14″E

Hoi Tong Monastery
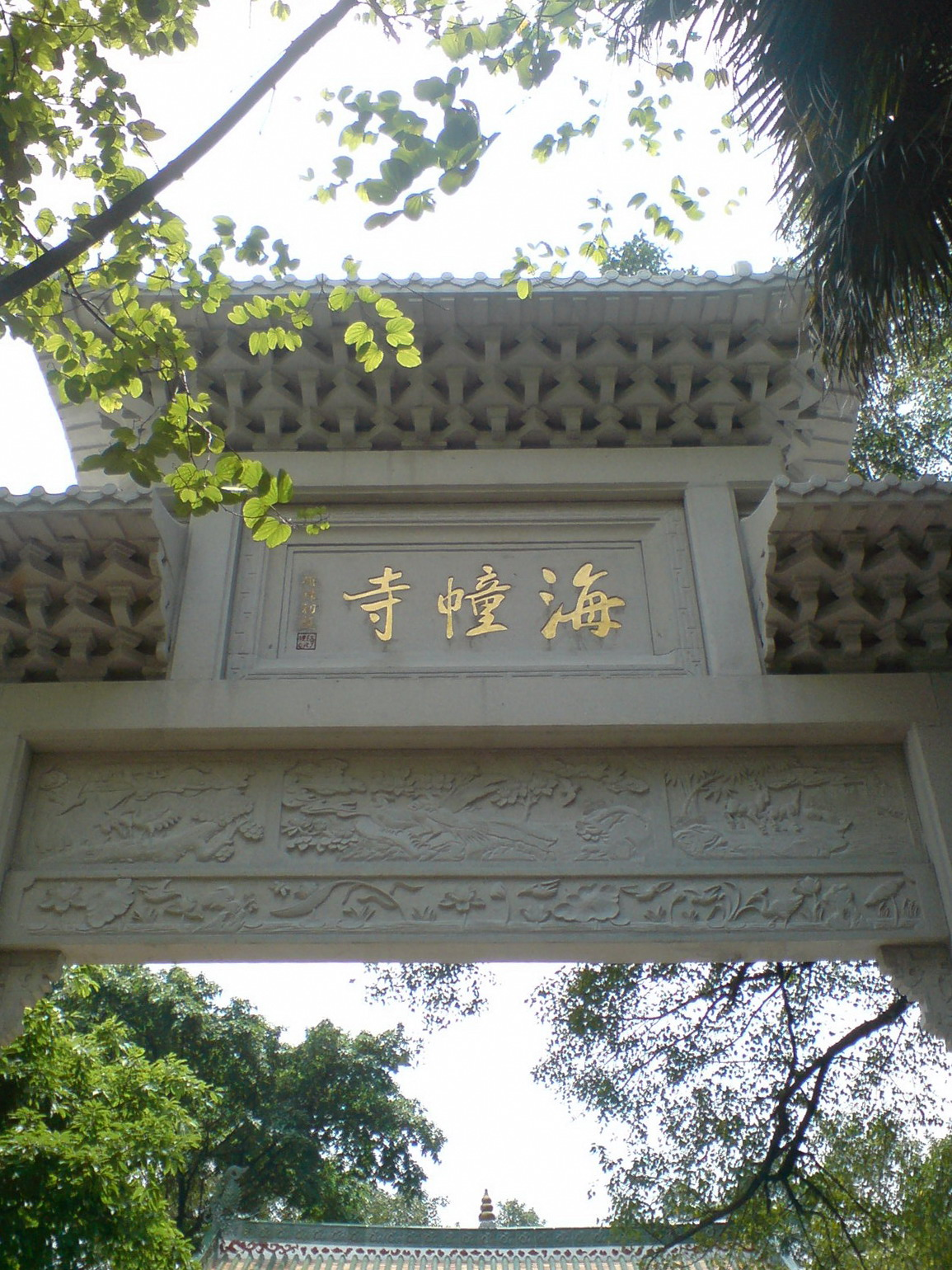
- The temple's main gate
- Chinese: 海幢寺
- Literal meaning: Sea-Banner Temple
Transcriptions
Standard Mandarin
- Hanyu Pinyin: Hǎichuángsì
- Wade–Giles: Hai-ch‘uang Ssu
Yue: Cantonese
- Jyutping: Hoi2 tong4 Zi6*2

Qianqiu Temple
- Chinese: 千秋寺
- Literal meaning: Thousand-Autumn Temple
Transcriptions
Standard Mandarin
- Hanyu Pinyin: Qiānqiūsì
- Wade–Giles: Ch‘ien-ch‘iu Ssu
Yue: Cantonese
- Jyutping: Cin1 cau1 Zi6*2

Haichuang Park
- Traditional Chinese: 海幢公園
- Simplified Chinese: 海幢公园
- Literal meaning: Sea Banner Public Park
Transcriptions
Standard Mandarin
- Hanyu Pinyin: Hǎichuáng Gōngyuán
- Wade–Giles: Hai-ch‘uang Kung-yüan
Yue: Cantonese
- Jyutping: Hoi2 tong4 Gung1 jyun4*2

Henan Park
- Traditional Chinese: 河南公園
- Simplified Chinese: 河南公园
- Literal meaning: South of the River Public Park
Transcriptions
Standard Mandarin
- Hanyu Pinyin: Hé'nán Gōngyuán
- Wade–Giles: He-nan Kung-yüan
Yue: Cantonese
- Jyutping: Ho4 naam4 Gung1 jyun4*2

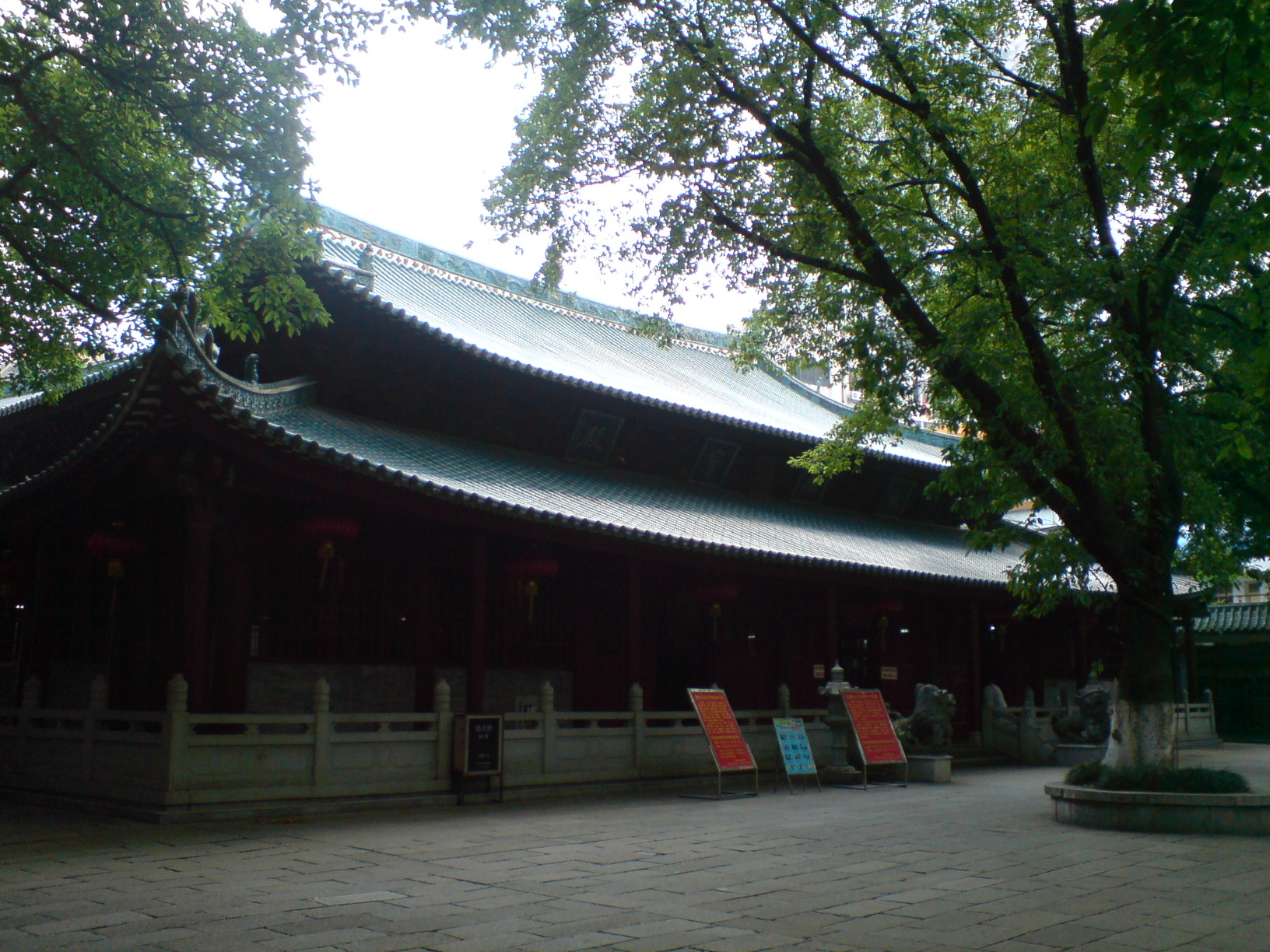
The temple's Main Hall

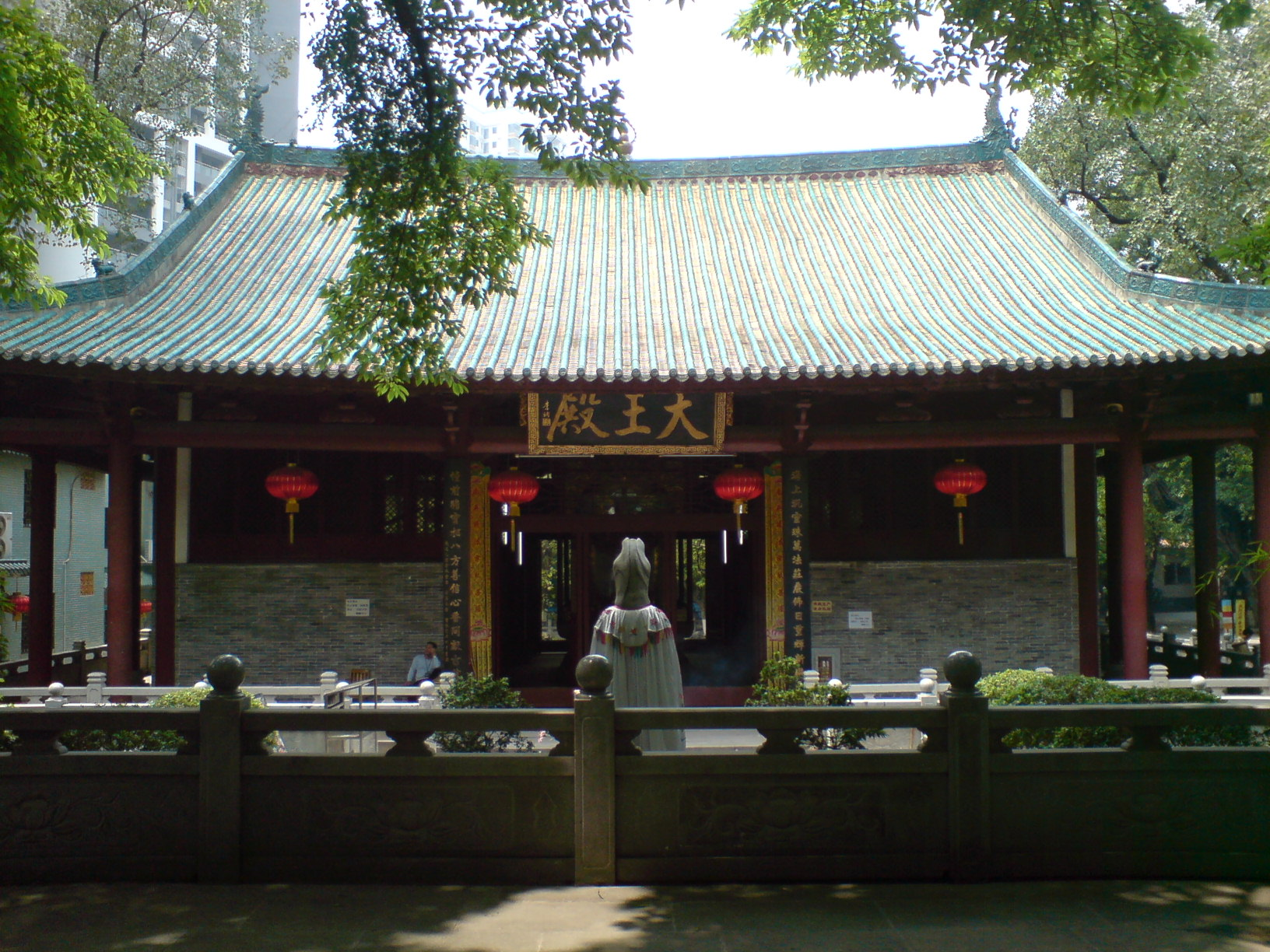
The Hall of the Heavenly Kings

The Hoi Tong Monastery, also known by many other names, is a Buddhist temple and monastery on Henan Island in Guangzhou, China. It shares its grounds with the city's Haichuang Park.

== Names ==
The official English form of the name is "Hoi Tong Monastery", a transcription of the Cantonese pronunciation of the Chinese translation of the Indian Buddhist monk Sāgaradhvaja (Sanskrit: सागरध्वज, lit "Ocean Banner" or "Flagpole"), who appears in the Flower Garland Sutra as a devout student of the Heart Sutra. Variants include Hoi Tong Temple; the translations Ocean Banner Temple or Monastery, Sea Banner Temple, and Sea Screen or Sea-screen Temple; the Mandarin Hae Chwang, Haichuang, and Hai-chuang Temple; and the misreadings "Hoy Hong Temple" and "Haizhuang Temple".

From its location, it has also been known as the Temple of Honan or Honam.

== History ==
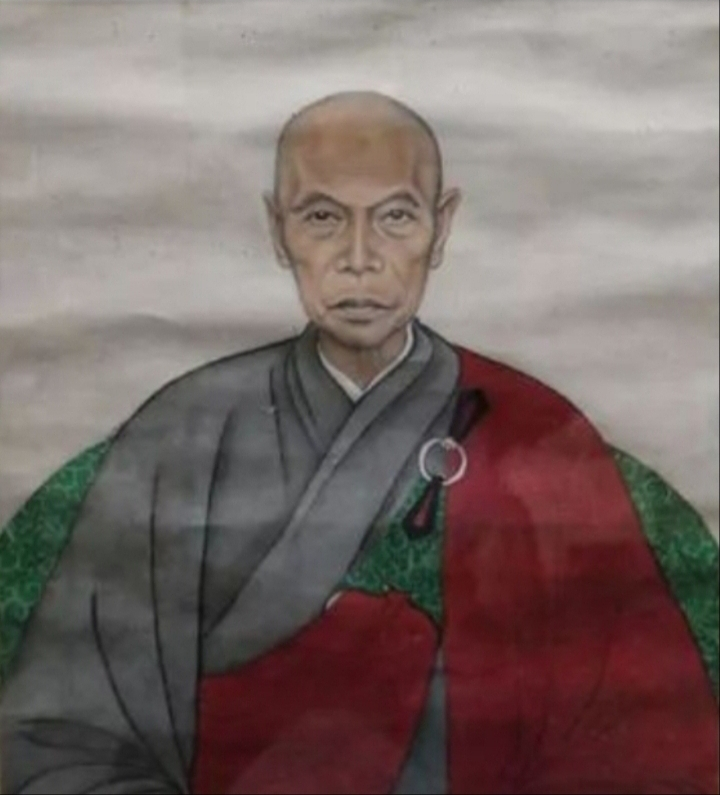
Portrait of the Jin Bao

The monastery was first established as the Qianqiu Temple under the Southern Han, a 10th-century Tang successor state whose capital was at Xingwang (now Guangzhou). The walled city lay north of the Pearl River, while Henan Island and the monastery lay to its south. By the end of the Ming, the temple operated within the private garden of Guo Longyue (郭龙岳). He was responsible for renaming it after the Buddhist monk Sāgaradhvaja.

The monastery, surrounded by majestic banyan trees, flourished under the early Qing. Jin Bao (金堡), a former minister of the Yongli Emperor, retired here. During the reign of the Kangxi Emperor, it was expanded continuously by the monks Azi (阿字), Chee Yut, and others, sometimes prompting English sources to place its establishment in 1662. Around a hundred monks lived at the monastery; the treatment of the wealthy and poor members was very unequal. It was the principal temple for Henan (then known as "Ho-nan") and sometimes even acclaimed the most famous of southern China's Buddhist temples.

The temple complex was particularly important to foreign visitors as it was one of the few locations in Guangzhou ("Canton") open to them before the First Opium War. The main hall's large buddhas were removed to other temples so that Lord Amherst and his retinue could rest there for three weeks 1–20 January 1817 before returning home via Macao following their failed embassy to Beijing ("Pekin"). The French artist Auguste Borget visited the temple repeatedly during his world tour, stating "The noise outside the temple was so great and the silence inside the temple was so solemn, that I believed myself transported to another world". The temple faced the row of factories on Guangzhou's waterfront. Regulations issued in 1831 restricted foreign access to its grounds to the 8th, 18th, and 28th days of the lunar months. Prior to the advent of photography, paintings of the grounds at Hoi Tong made up one of the fifteen classes of Qing export paintings. (Note: The other fourteen were the city and port of Guangzhou, its markets and street vendors, its government offices and paraphrenalia, its riverine and maritime traffic, Chinese clothing, the workshops of Foshan, Chinese punishments, Chinese gardens and mansions, its religious architecture and rituals, opium addicts, Chinese interior decorating including its plants and birds, Chinese opera, Beijing life and customs, and its shop signs.)

At the time, the river entrance was the most used, leading to a courtyard guarded by a pair of wooden statues. Beyond, there were flagged walks amid banyan trees, leading to colonnades filled with numerous statues "of every sect and profession". At the far end were three halls, the center of which held three 11-foot (3.4 m) statues of the Buddhas past, present, and yet-to-come—"Kwo-keu-fuh", "Heen-tsa-fuh", and "We-lae-fuh"—in a seated position. On each side were 18 early disciples of the Buddha, considered at the time to have been the precursors to the Qing emperors. Illustrations were made of the trial and punishment of sinners in the afterlife, but none of the Buddhist paradises. The side walls were covered with silk embroidered in gold and silver thread with passages of scripture, and the whole lit with several hundred lanterns suspended from the roof's crossbeams. The garden included rare plants and penjing, miniature trees grown into the shape of boats and birdcages. On the grounds, pigs and other animals were kept as an "illustration of the Buddhist tenet not to destroy but to care for animal life". The pigs became famous, some being so enormously fat that they were nearly unable to walk. Some of the sties were located with the temples and, upon their deaths, they were accorded funereal rites and laid within a special mausoleum on the grounds. Its library was well stocked. The monastery ran its own printing press, as well as a crematorium and mausoleum for the monks. This dagoba was considered "magnificent", if not on the level of Beijing's Baita. The abbot's cell included a separate reception room and a small chapel with a shrine to Buddha. The entire grounds spread over about 7 acres (2.8 ha).

The monastery was also a site for instruction in kung fu. The master Liang Kun (Leung Kwan) died while training in the 36-Point Copper Ring Pole technique under the monk Yuanguang in 1887. In the 1920s, it housed Guangzhou's Chin Woo Athletic Association.

The great trees of the monastery were ruined during the Taiping Rebellion. The monastery faded from importance in foreign guidebooks after the Opium Wars opened Guangzhou proper to visitors, although the principal factories were removed to Henan during the years 1856–1859 after a devastating fire along the north bank and the number of monks grew as high as 175. During the reign of the Empress Dowager Cixi, the area around the monastery became more residential and it began to fade. As part of the educational reforms surrounding the end of the imperial examination system, the monastery was obliged to make room for the Nanwu Public School (南武公学). It was severely damaged during the early years of the Republic, although it was protected for a time by local elites. The entire compound aside from two halls was demolished and in 1928 its land was confiscated and opened as Henan Park. Its scriptures were removed to a public library. An official embassy of the city's Buddhists to the capital at Nanjing the next year was a failure, but the park was permitted to keep some of its statues "for public appreciation". Praying and burning incense in the park were outlawed, but locals continued to tie paper offerings to the Buddhas and several women came at night to pray. Their murmuring was sometimes mistaken by other visitors as the sounds of ghosts haunting the grounds. In September 1933, the area was renamed "Haichuang Park". The surviving buildings of the complex were severely damaged again during the Cultural Revolution of the late 1960s and early '70s.

Following China's opening up, the Guangzhou Municipal People's Government permitted the monastery to resume official operation in 1993, identifying it as a heritage conservation unit. The grounds of the monastery were repaired and renovated but continue to only occupy the western half of the former site, the rest making up Guangzhou's Haichuang Park. This was restored to the temple by the Haizhu District People's Government on 1 July 2006 but remains open to the public.

== Abbots ==
The present abbot is Master Xincheng (新成).

== Gallery ==
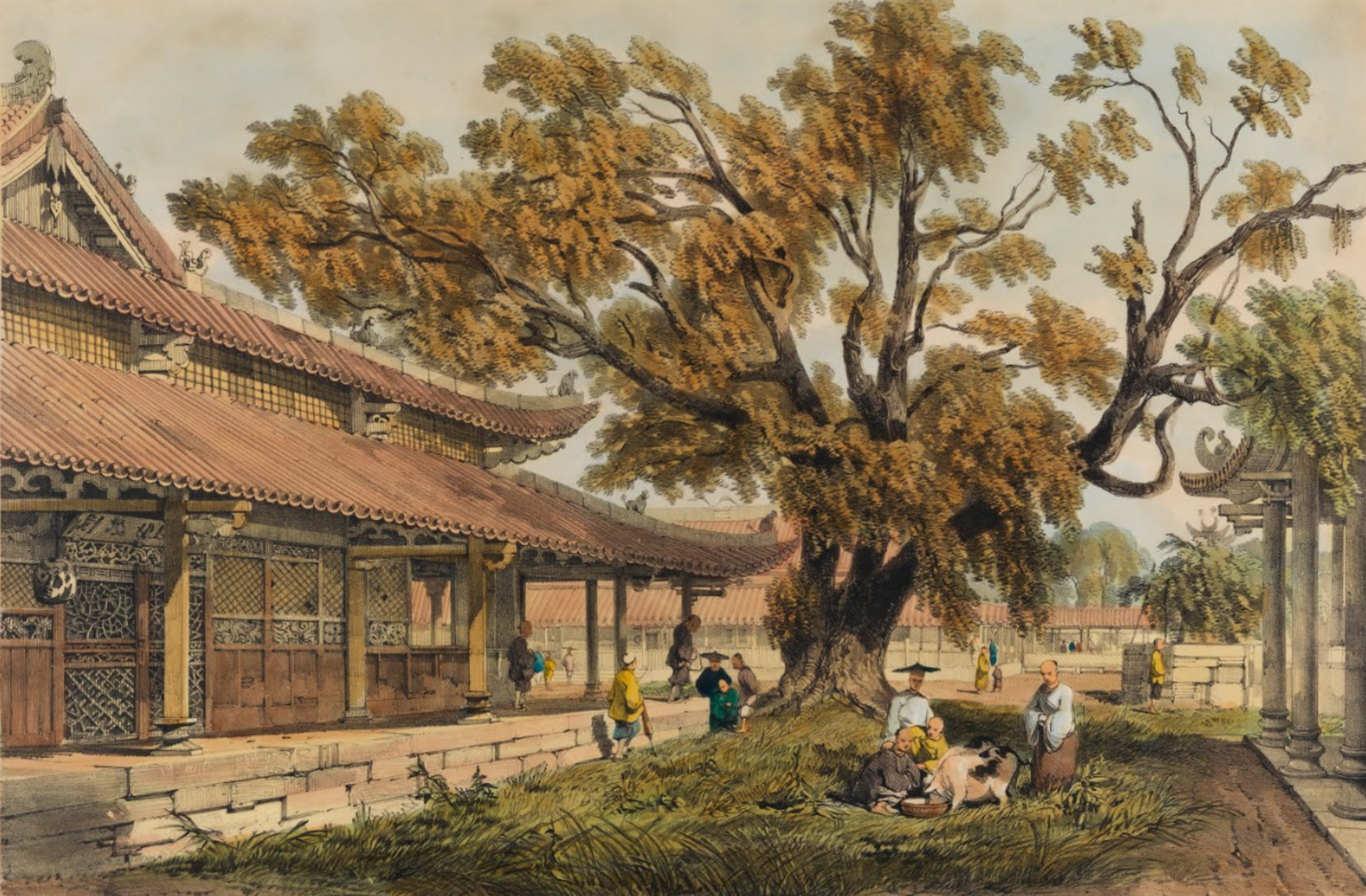
The "Sea-screen Temple at Honam" in 1838, by Auguste Borget, including some of the temple's sacred pigs.

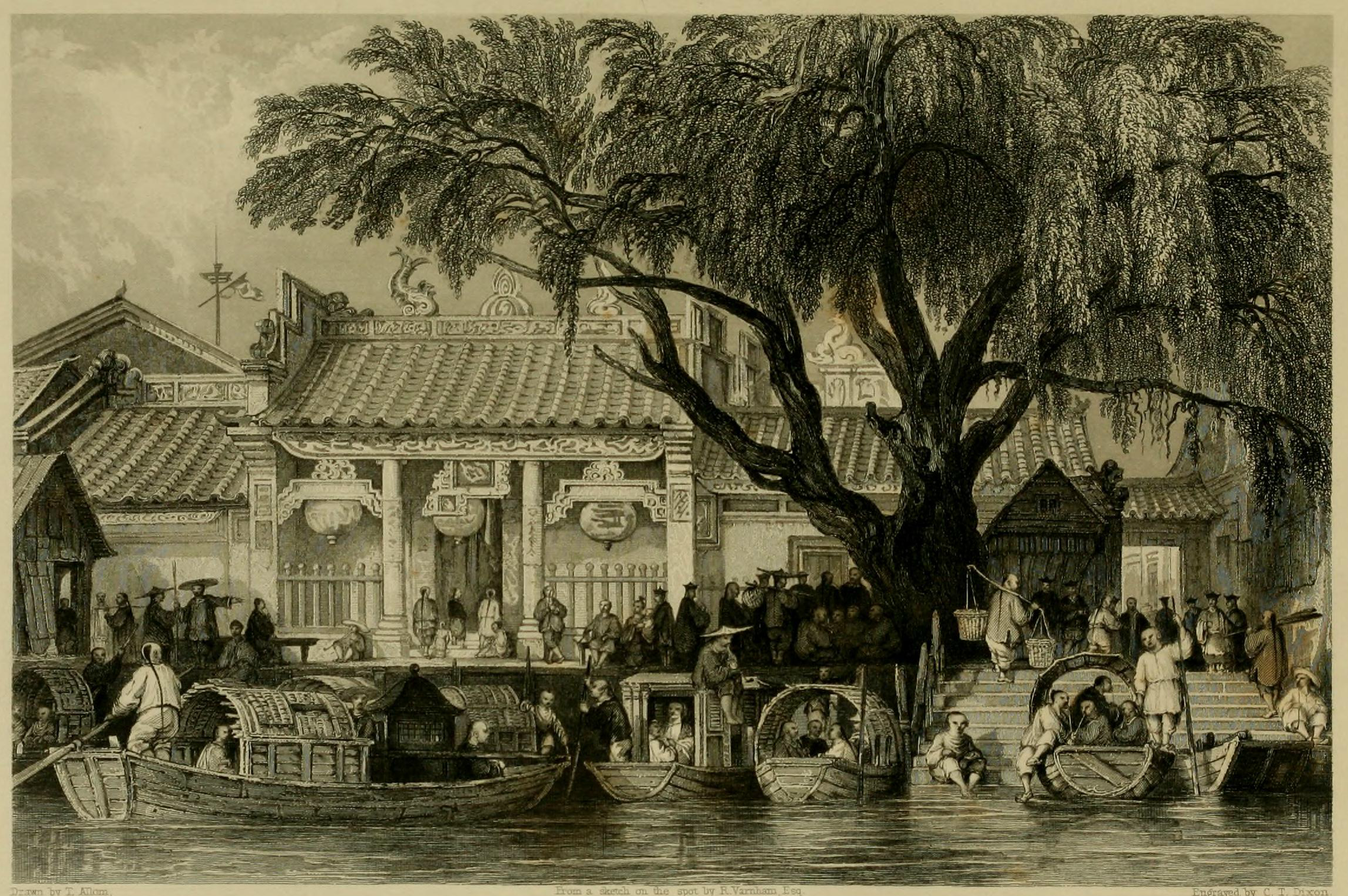
The landing place and river entrance to the "Temple of Honan" in the 1840s.

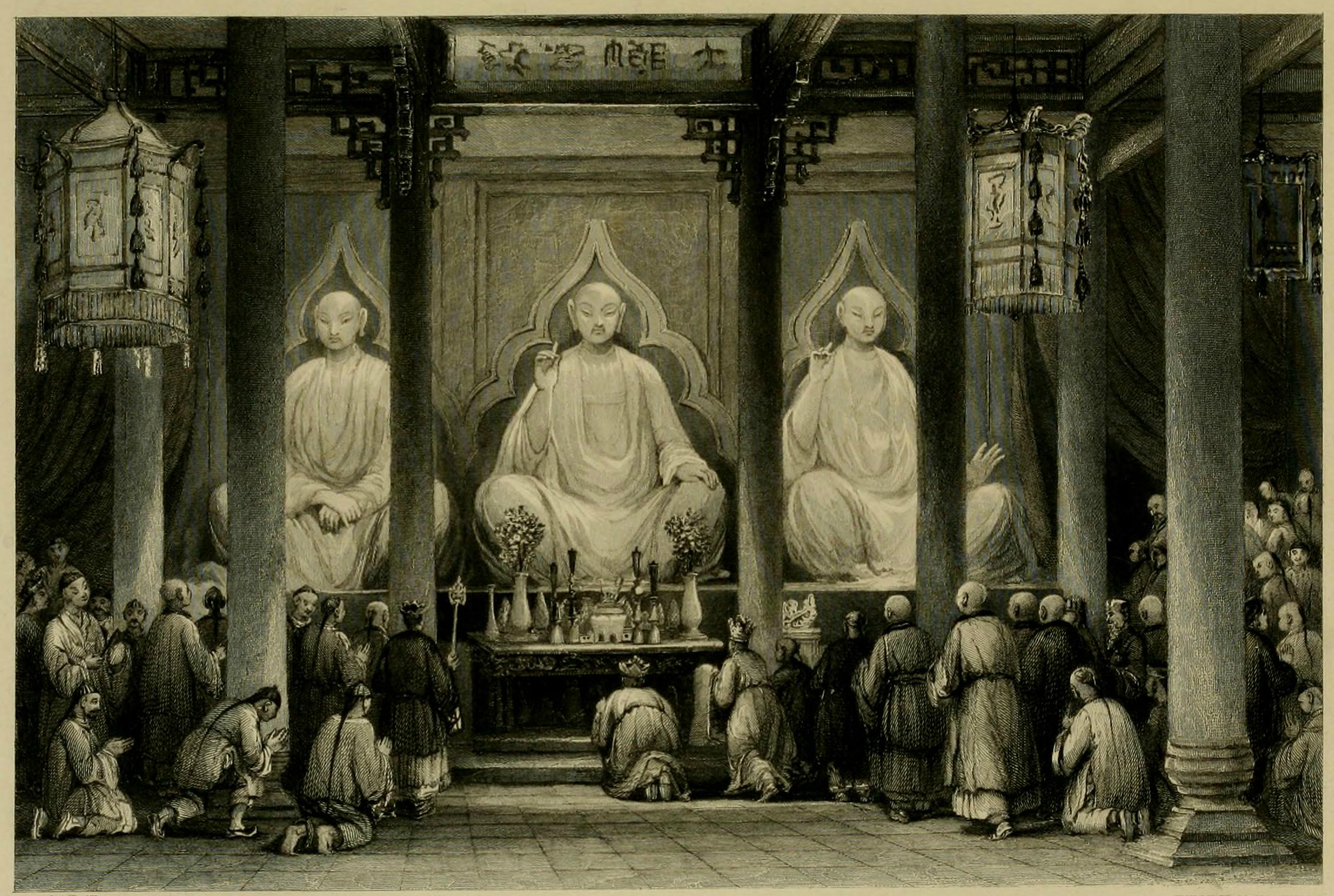
The "Great Temple at Honan" in the 1840s.

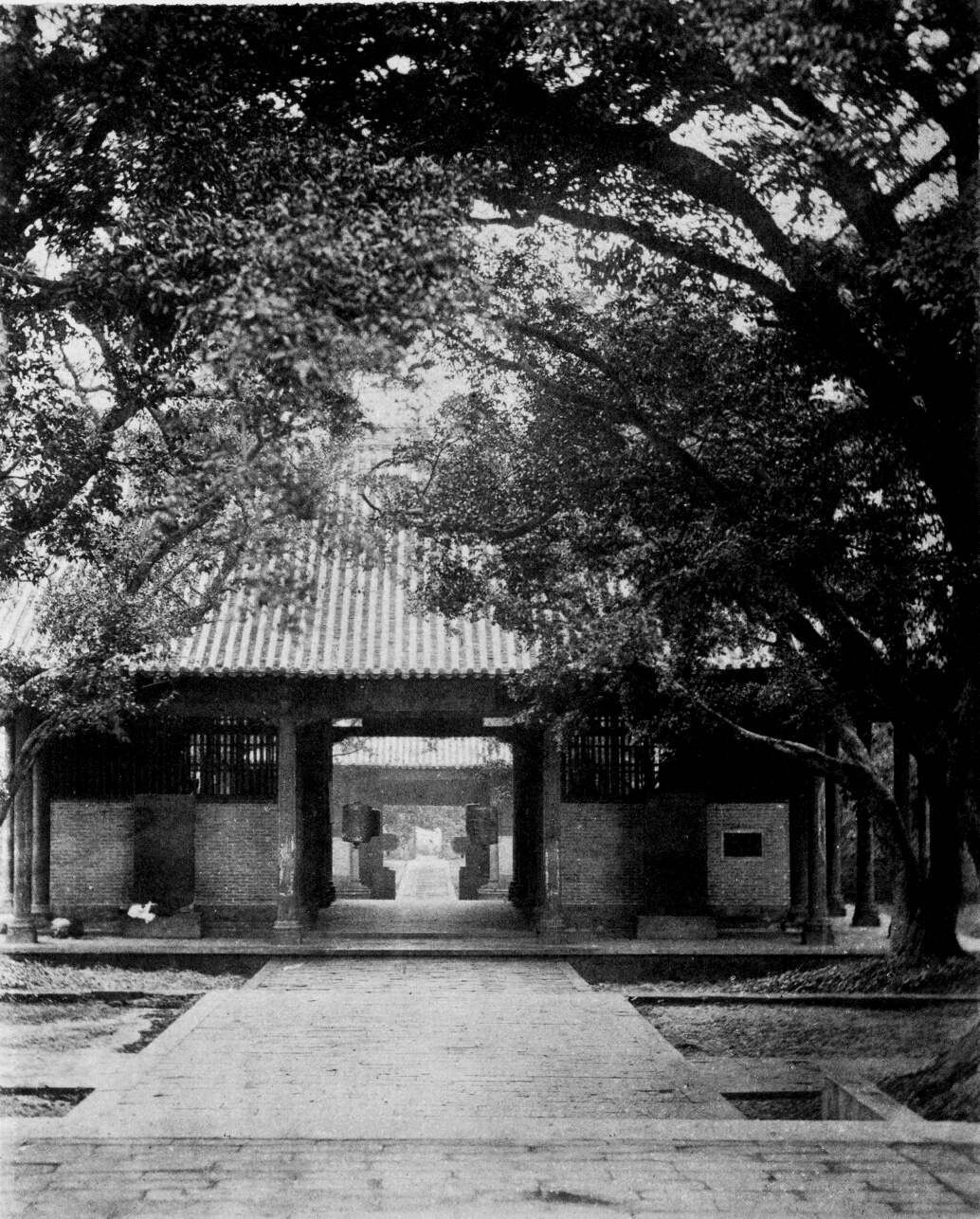
The entrance to the inner courtyards of "Honam Temple" in 1874

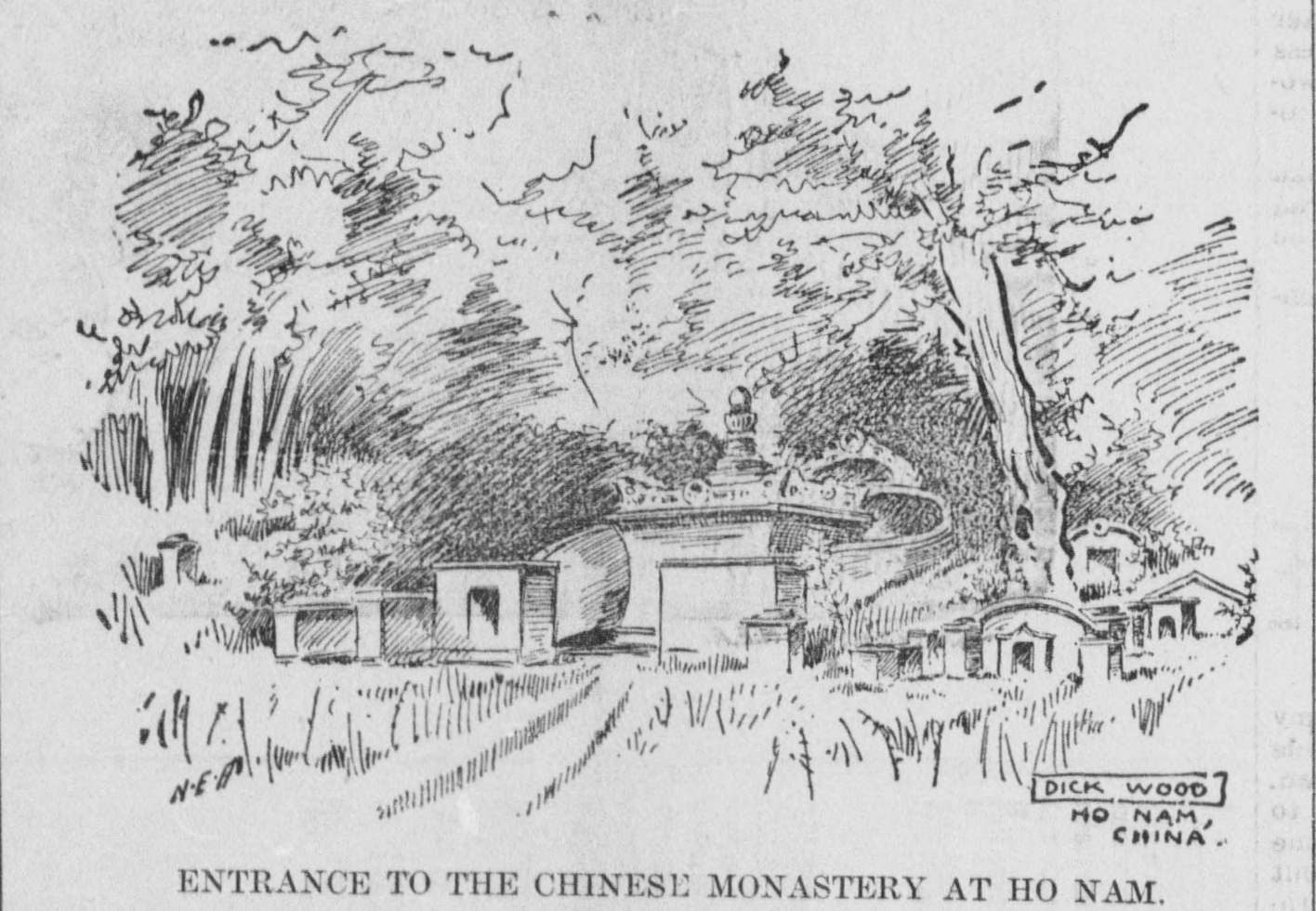
The land entrance to the "Chinese monastery at Ho Nam" in 1903.

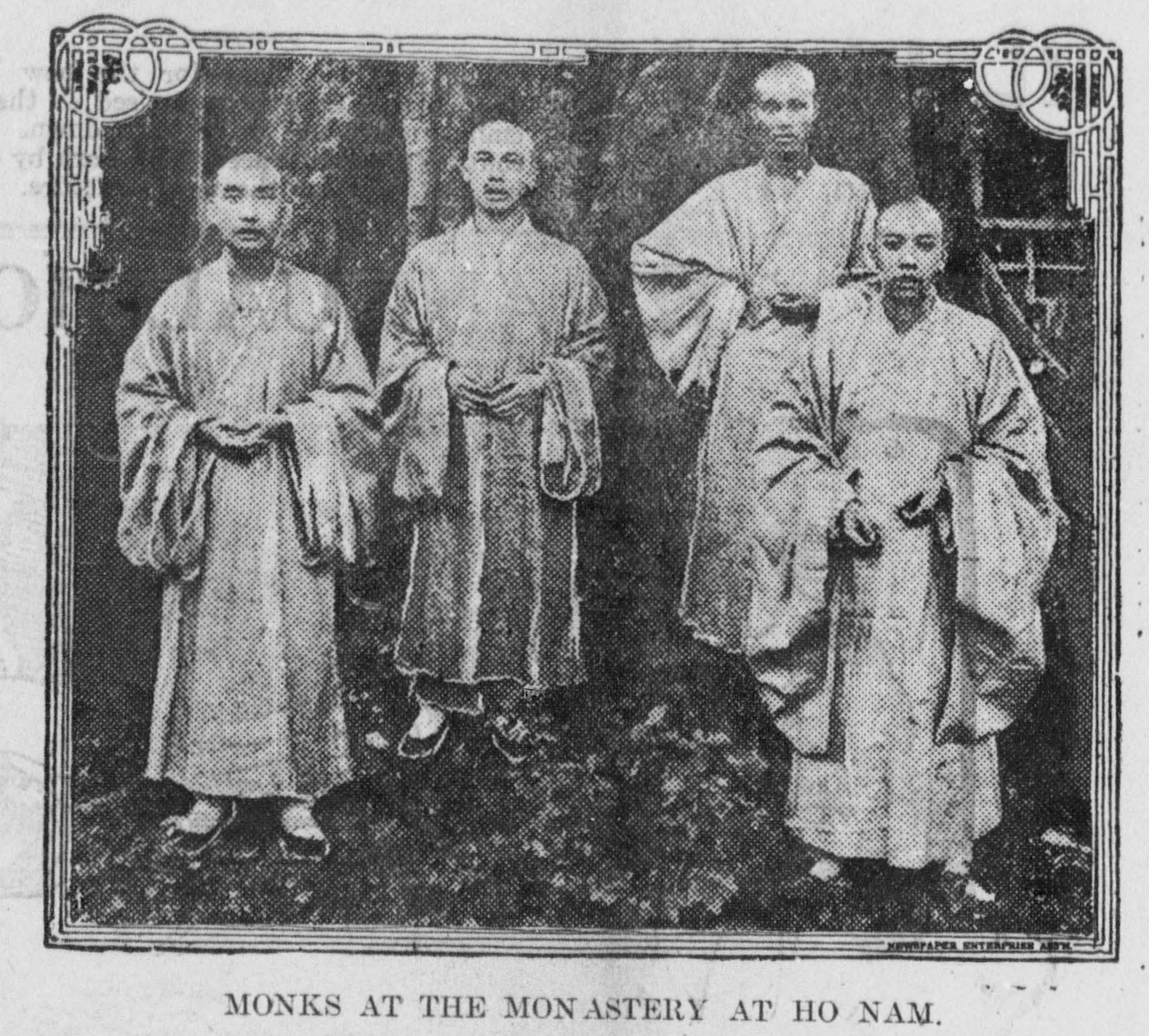
Monks at the monastery in 1903.

== See also ==
- Chinese Buddhism
- List of Buddhist temples
- Guangxiao Temple (Guangzhou)
- Hualin Temple (Guangzhou)
- Temple of the Six Banyan Trees
