= Guangxiao Temple (Guangzhou) =

Buddhist temple in Guangzhou, China

- 光孝寺
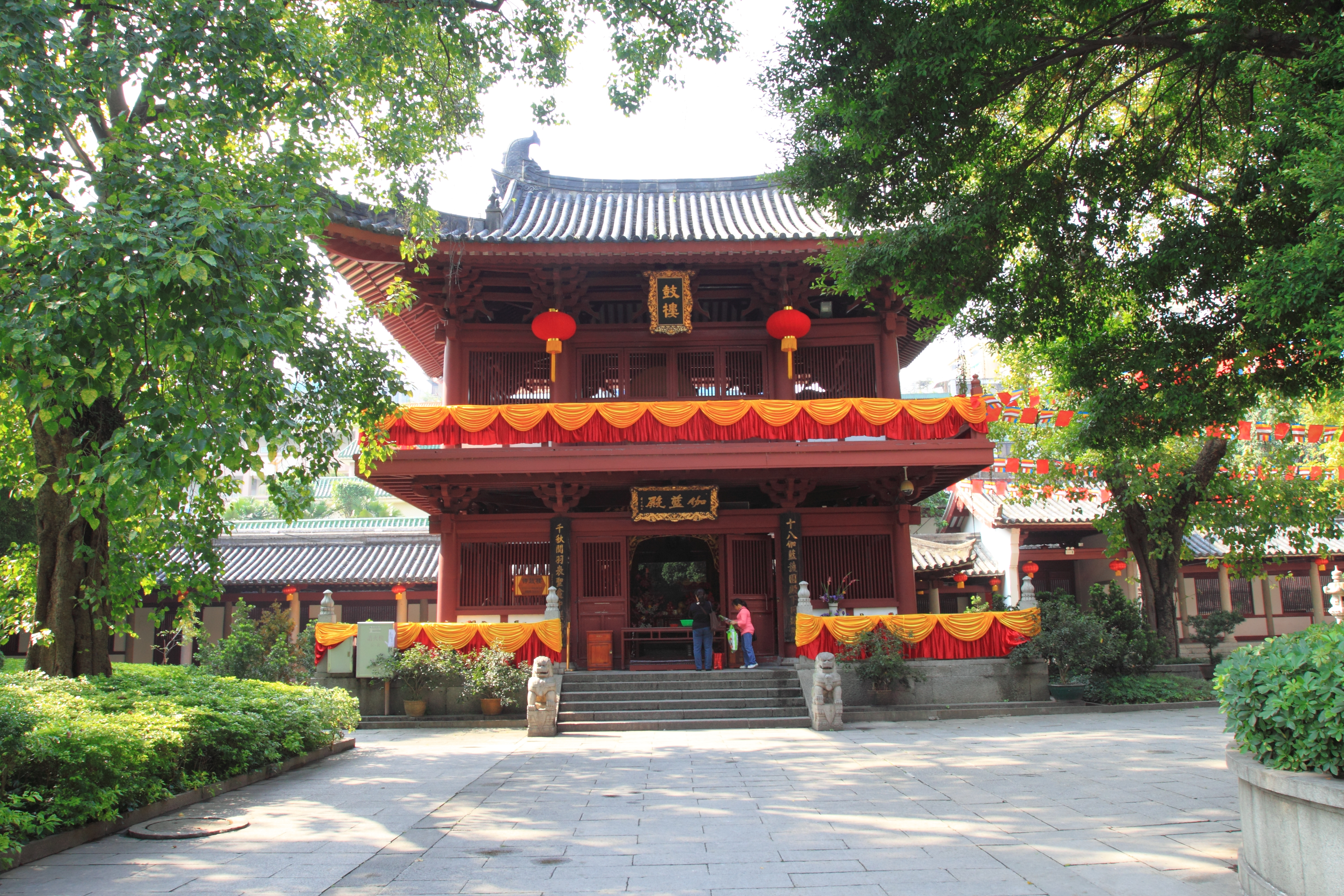

- Location within Guangdong Location within China

Religion
- Affiliation: Buddhism
- Deity: precepts school, Chan (Zen), Shingon Buddhism, and Pure Land

Location
- Location: Yuexiu District, Guangzhou, Guangdong
- Country: China
- Coordinates: 23°07′56″N 113°15′04″E

Architecture
- Style: Chinese architecture
- Founder: Yu Fan's family
- Established: 233

Guangxiao Temple
- Chinese: 光孝寺
- Literal meaning: Bright Obedience Temple; Bright Filial-Piety Temple
Transcriptions
Standard Mandarin
- Hanyu Pinyin: Guāngxiào Sì
- Wade–Giles: Kuang¹-hsiao⁴ Szu⁴
Yue: Cantonese
- Jyutping: Gwong1 haau3 Zi6*2

Former names

Zhizhi Temple
- Traditional Chinese: 制旨寺
- Simplified Chinese: 制止寺
Transcriptions
Yue: Cantonese
- Jyutping: zai3 zi2 zi2

Wangyuanchaoyan Temple
- Chinese: 王苑朝延寺
Transcriptions
Yue: Cantonese
- Jyutping: wong4 jyun2 ciu4 jin4 zi2

Wangyuan Temple
- Traditional Chinese: 王園寺
Transcriptions
Yue: Cantonese
- Jyutping: wong4 jyun4 zi2

Qianmingfaxing Temple
- Traditional Chinese: 乾明法性寺
Transcriptions

Chongningwanshou Temple
- Traditional Chinese: 崇寧萬壽寺
Transcriptions
Yue: Cantonese
- Jyutping: sung4 ning4 maan6 sau6 zi2

Baoenguangxiaochan Temple
- Traditional Chinese: 報恩廣孝禪寺
Transcriptions
Yue: Cantonese
- Jyutping: bou3 jan1 gwong2 haau3 sim4 zi2

Guangxiao Temple (Chinese: 光孝寺; Jyutping: Gwong1 Haau3 Zi2) is one of the oldest Buddhist temples in Guangzhou, the capital of China's Guangdong Province. As the special geographical position, Guangxiao Temple often acted as a stopover point for Asian missionary monks in the past. It also played a central role in propagating various elements of Buddhism, including precepts school, Chan (Zen), Shingon Buddhism, and Pure Land. In this temple, Huineng, the sixth Chinese patriarch of Chan Buddhism, made his first public Chan lecture and was tonsured, and Amoghavajra, a Shingon Buddhist master, gave his first teaching of esoteric Buddhism. Many Buddhist scriptures were also translated here, including those translated by Yijing and the Shurangama-sūtra translated by Paramitiin (般剌密諦).

== History ==
=== Han dynasty ===
Guangxiao originated from the residence of Zhao Jiande, the king of Nanyue whose usurpation prompted Emperor Wu of the Han (206 BC–8 AD) to invade and annex the area. During the Three Kingdoms, the Wu officer and scholar Yu Fan was banished to live at the residence. After Yu Fan died in 233, his family donated the estate, whose grounds were organized as the Zhizhi Temple. It was repeatedly renamed: the Wangyuanchaoyan Temple, the Wangyuan Temple, the Qianmingfaxing Temple, the Chongningwanshou Temple, and the Baoenguangxiaochan Temple.

Between the 4th and 10th centuries, many monks from South Asia (especially India) or mainland China came to the coastal Guangxiao Temple. During the period, Guangxiao Temple reached its peak. In the subsequent centuries, some eminent Chinese monks also visited or lived at Guangxiao Temple to propagate Buddhism, such as Danxia Tianran (丹霞天然) and Yangshan Huiji.

=== Ming dynasty ===
In 1482, the Chenghua Emperor of the Ming dynasty renamed it Guangxiao Temple and personally recorded the new name on a stele. Since then, the temple has kept the name "Guangxiao".

=== Qing dynasty ===
In the 17th and 18th century, Guangxiao Temple fell into decline, although it underwent restoration several times. Many of the current main buildings were last rebuilt during this period.

=== Modern China ===
In the last two centuries, Guangxiao Temple was attacked during movements to "Requisition Temple Property to Promote Education" (廟產興學; 1898–1931) and the Cultural Revolution (1966–1976), causing damage to some of the buildings of Guangxiao Temple. Some buildings were also occupied for secular usage.

In the 1980s, Guangxiao Temple was reoccupied by Buddhist monks. ‘Dharma pillars’ have also been erected in front of each hall. In addition, an animal liberation pond has been built near these structures. These reconstructed buildings have restored Guangxiao Temple to some extent; however, the scale of the temple today is much smaller than in the past.

The temple's records are principally recorded in a thread-bound edition entitled The Annals of Guangxiao Temple (光孝寺志), written in 1769.

== Architecture ==
The extant buildings and halls include the Shanmen, Tianwang Hall, Daxiongbao Hall, Yifa Pagoda, etc.

=== Daxiongbao Hall ===
The Daxiongbao Hall was originally built in 401 in the Eastern Jin dynasty (317–420) by senior monk Dharmayasas from Western Regions and was later built and renovated in many succeeding dynasties, with the final rebuilding taking place in 1654 during the reign of the Shunzhi Emperor of the Qing dynasty. It is 35.36 metres (116.0 ft) wide, 24.8 metres (81 ft) deep and 13.6 metres (45 ft) high and preserves the largest, grandest and most magnificent hall in Lingnan Region. Flat and far-reaching, the eaves of the hall can adapt to the high temperature and heavy rains in the south China and the beams and pillars can avoid erosion by wind and rain. Instead of brick walls, the hall is surrounded by wooden windows which are engraved with flower patterns. Some of the windows are decorated with translucent shells, which dissipate heat, ventilate and collect light well. The hall houses statues of Sakyamuni, Amitabha and Maitreya.

=== Liuzu Hall ===
The Liuzu Hall (六祖殿), meaning "Hall of the Sixth Patriarch", is located next to the Hair Burying Pagoda. It was first built during the reign of Emperor Zhenzong of the Northern Song dynasty to commemorate the eminent monk Huineng, Sixth Patriarch of Chan Buddhism. The current structure was last rebuilt in 1692 during the reign of Kangxi Emperor of the Qing dynasty. The hall enshrines a statue of the Sixth Patriarch Huineng.

=== Tianwang Hall ===
The Tianwang Hall (天王殿), meaning "Hall of the Four Heavenly Kings", enshrines statues of the Four Heavenly Kings. The current structure dates back to the reign of the Jiaqing Emperor of the Qing dynasty.

=== Qielan Hall ===
The Qielan Hall (伽藍殿), meaning "Hall of Sangharama" dates back to the Qing dynasty.

=== Great Compassion Column ===
The Great Compassion Column (大悲幢) stands in front of the Daxiongbao Hall. It was made in 826 during the reign of Emperor Jingzong of the Tang dynasty (618–907). It is over 2 metres (6 ft 7 in) high and made of green marble. Octagonal in shape, it has elegant style with a mushroom-shaped canopy on the top and engraved relief of Hercules at the bottom base. The Great Compassion Mantra in Sanskrit and Chinese are inscribed on the body.

=== Yifa Pagoda ===
Under the Bodhi tree behind the Daxiongbao Hall stands the Yifa Pagoda (瘗髪塔), meaning "Hair Burying Pagoda", which was erected sometime between 676 and 679 during the Tang dynasty. In 676 during the Yifeng era (676–679) in the Tang dynasty (618–907), master Huineng cut his hair and received ordination as a monk. Abbot Yinzong (印宗) buried his hair here and built a pagoda to commemorate it. Octagonal in shape and 7.8 metres (26 ft) high, it has 7 stories with 8 niches on each. It is one out of five preserved and extant Tang dynasty pagodas remaining in Guangdong province.

=== East Tower and West Tower ===
Two iron pagoda are erected behind the Daxiongbao Hall, which are the oldest existing iron towers in China. Built in the 963 in the Southern Han dynasty (907–960), the original West Tower was seven stories but now only preserves the bottom three floors.

The East Tower was built in the 967 in the Southern Han dynasty (907–960) by Emperor Liu Chang. Square in shape, it has seven stories with the height of 7.69 metres (25.2 ft). Over 900 exquisite niches with small statues of Buddha are carved on the body of the pagoda. When first built, it was covered with gold and known as Gilded Thousand Buddha Pagoda (塗金千佛塔).

== Transportation ==
The temple is accessible within walking distance north of Ximenkou Station of Guangzhou Metro.

== Gallery ==
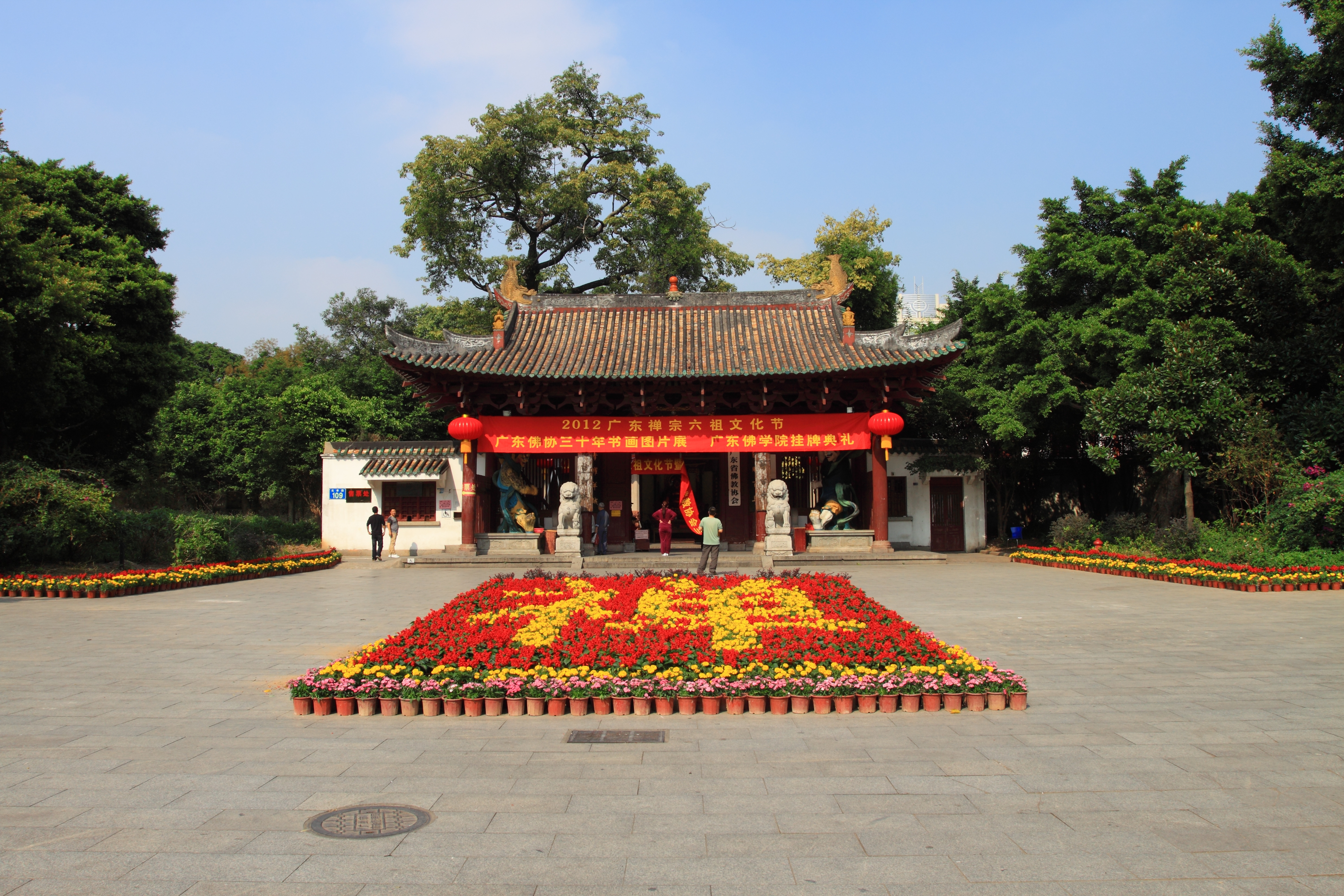
Shanmen

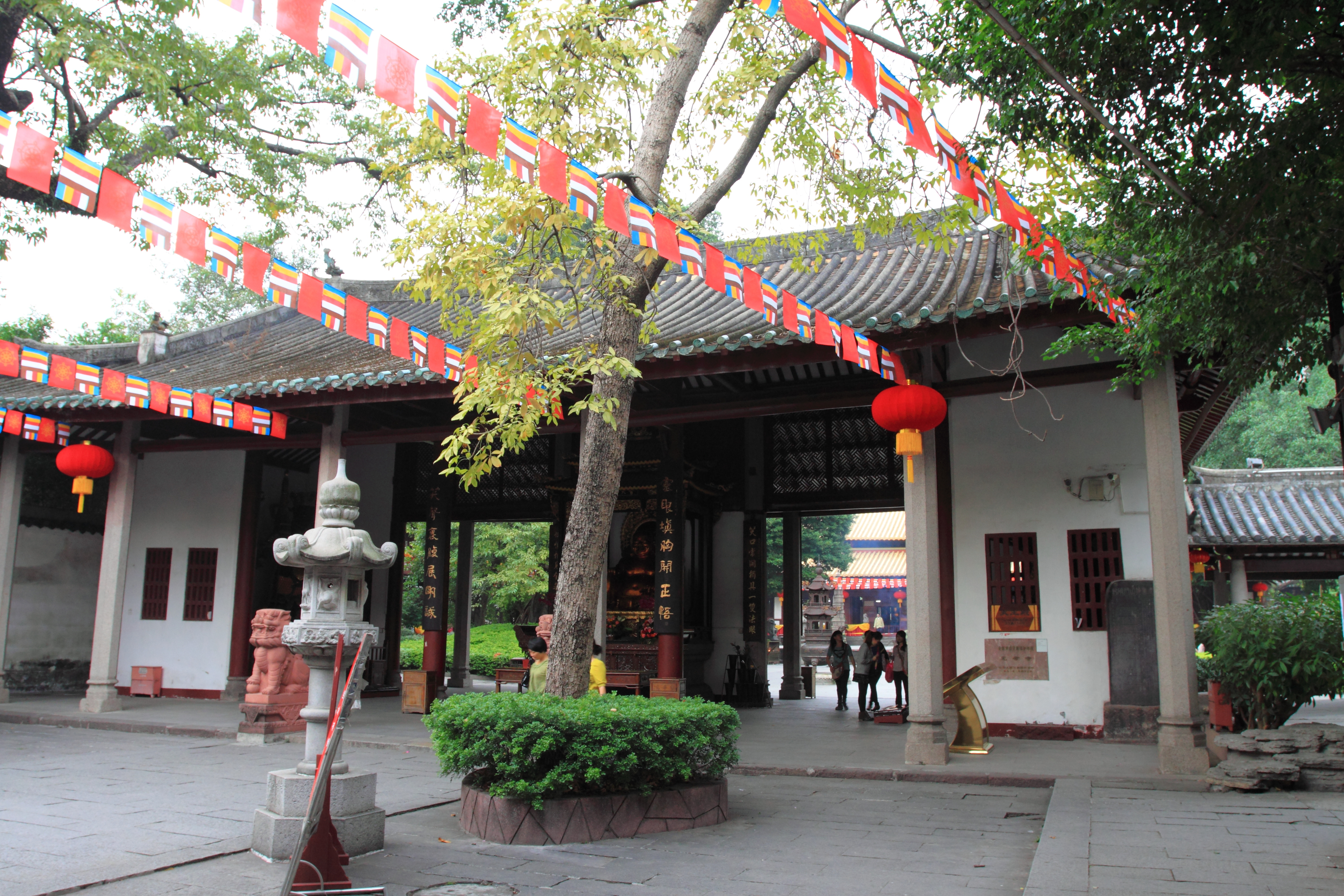
Tianwang Hall

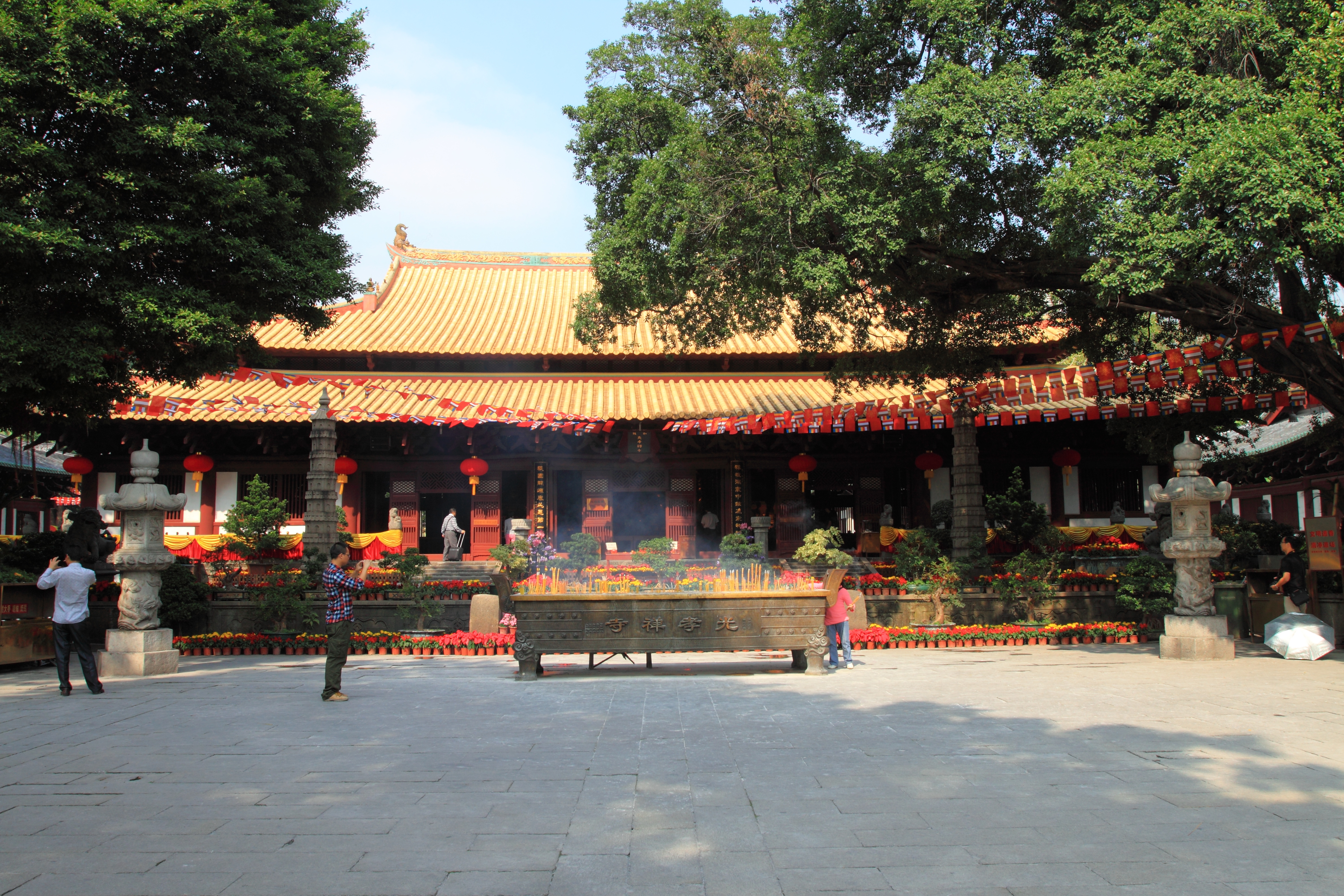
Daxiongbao Hall

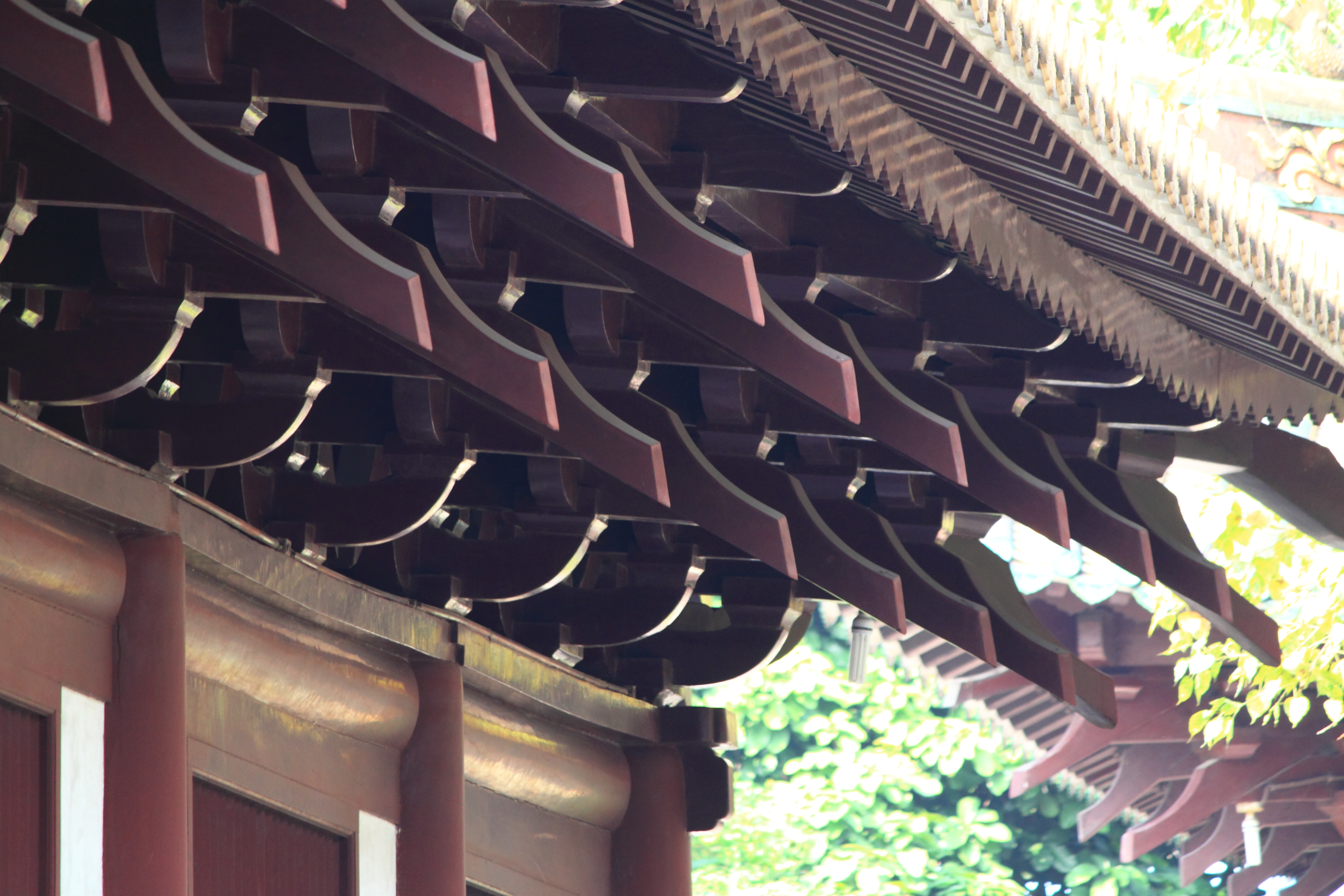

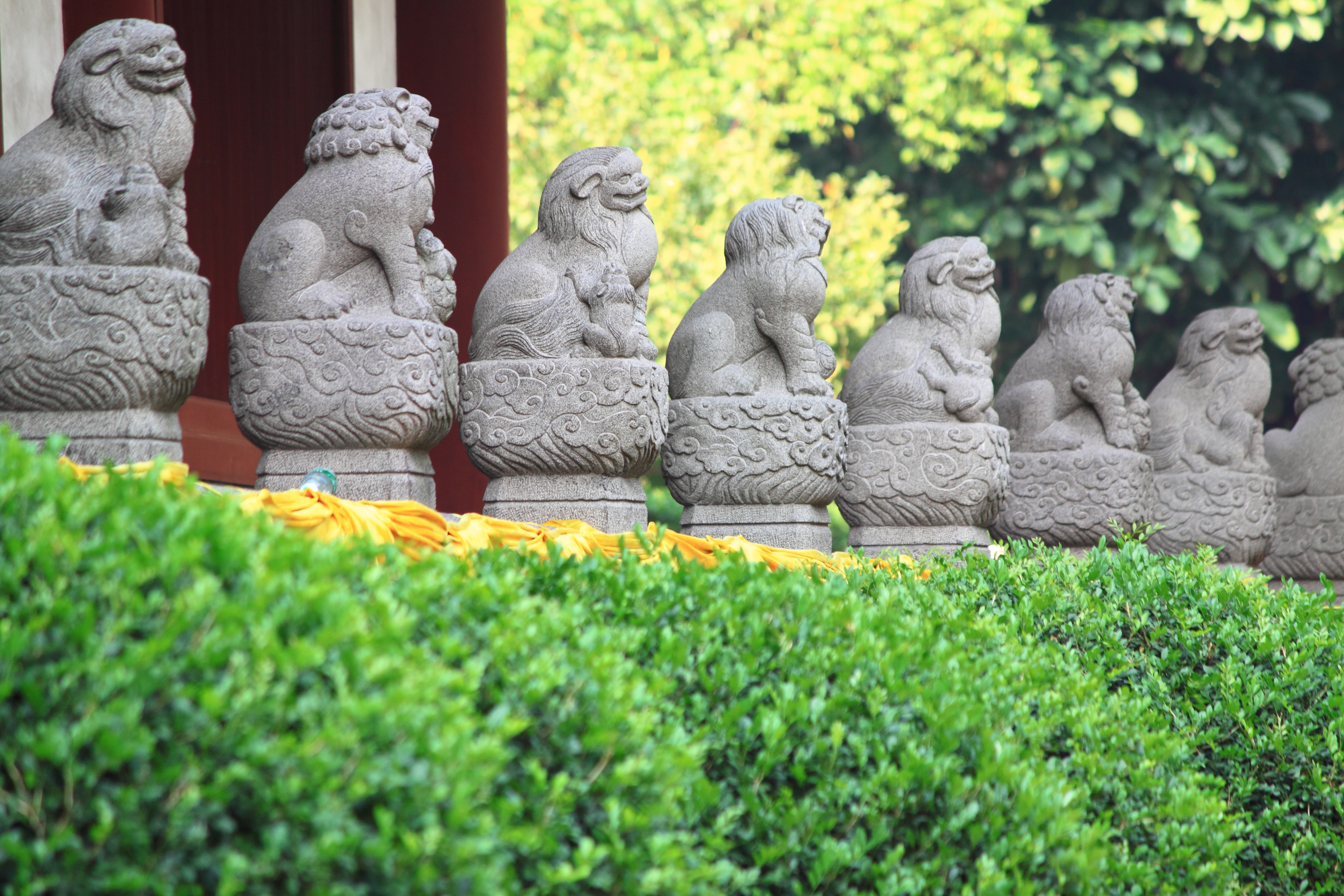

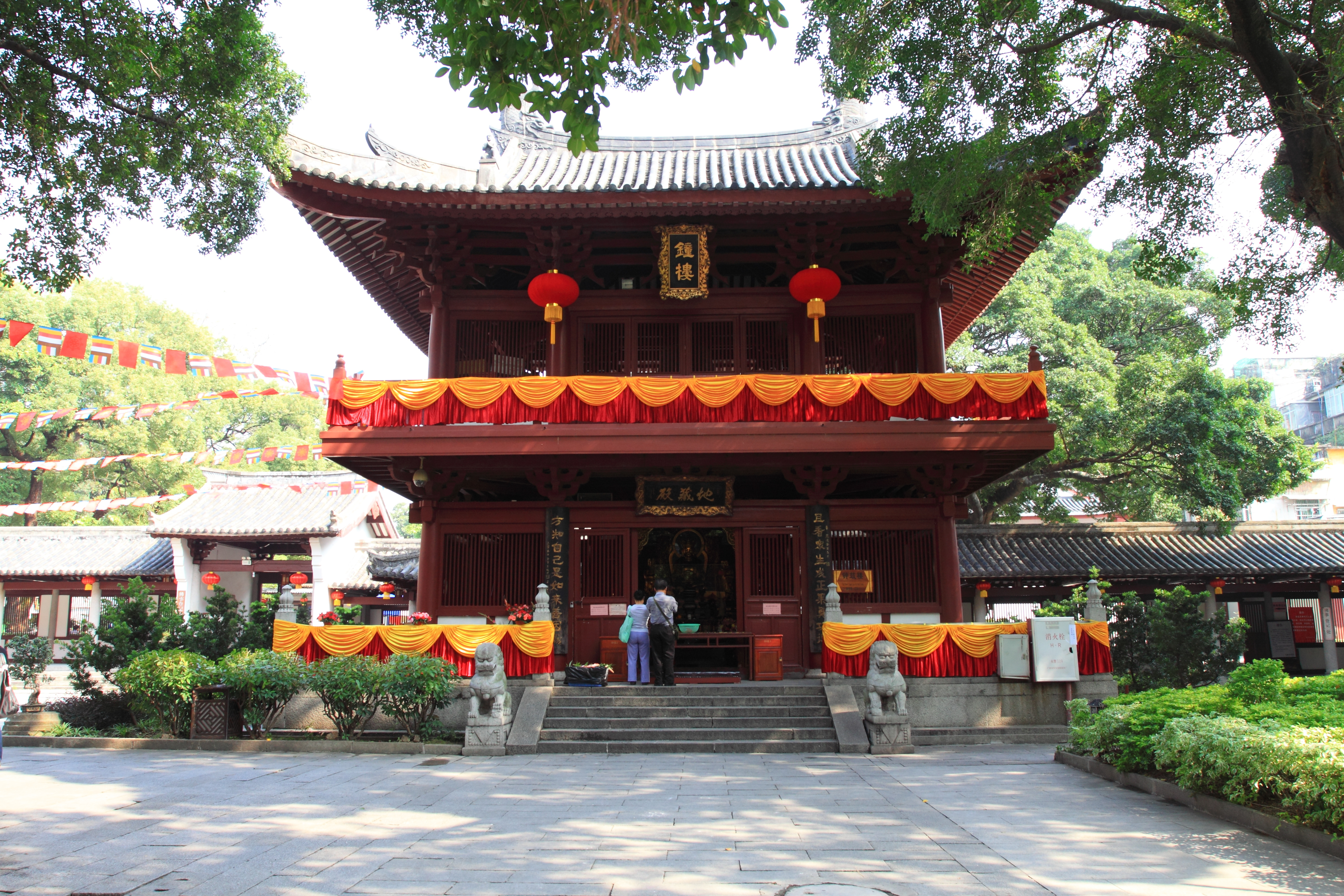

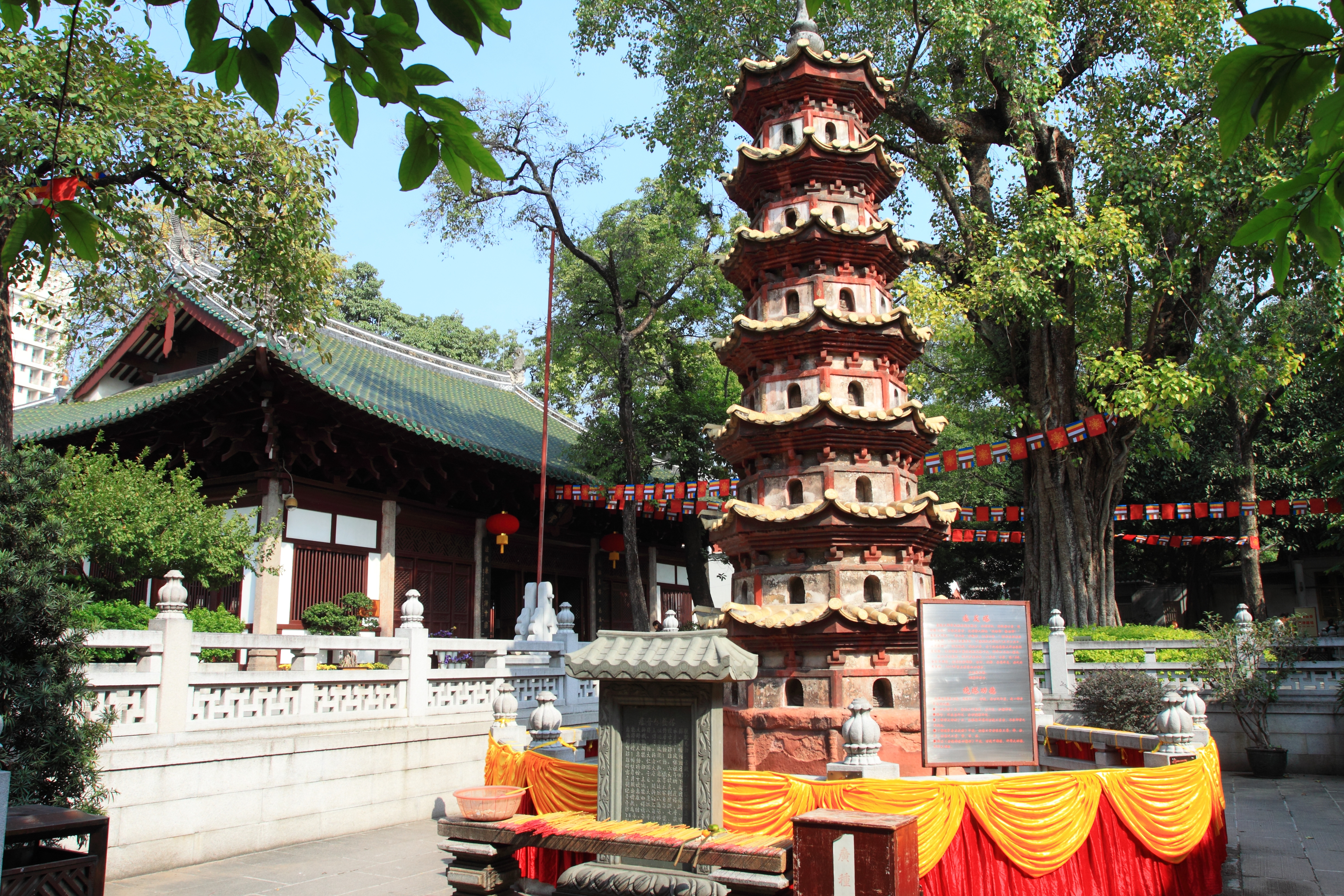
Yifa Pagoda

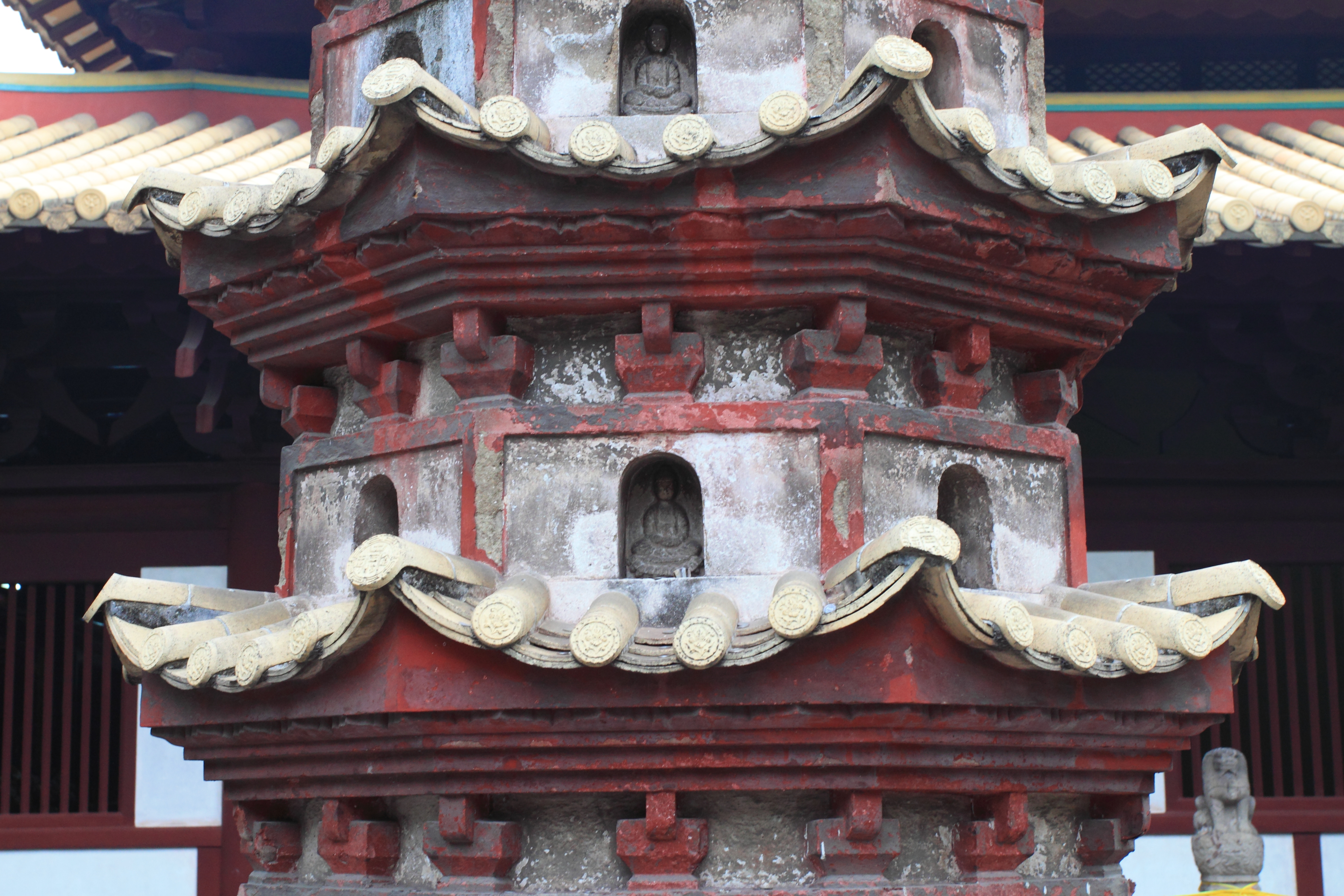
Yifa Pagoda

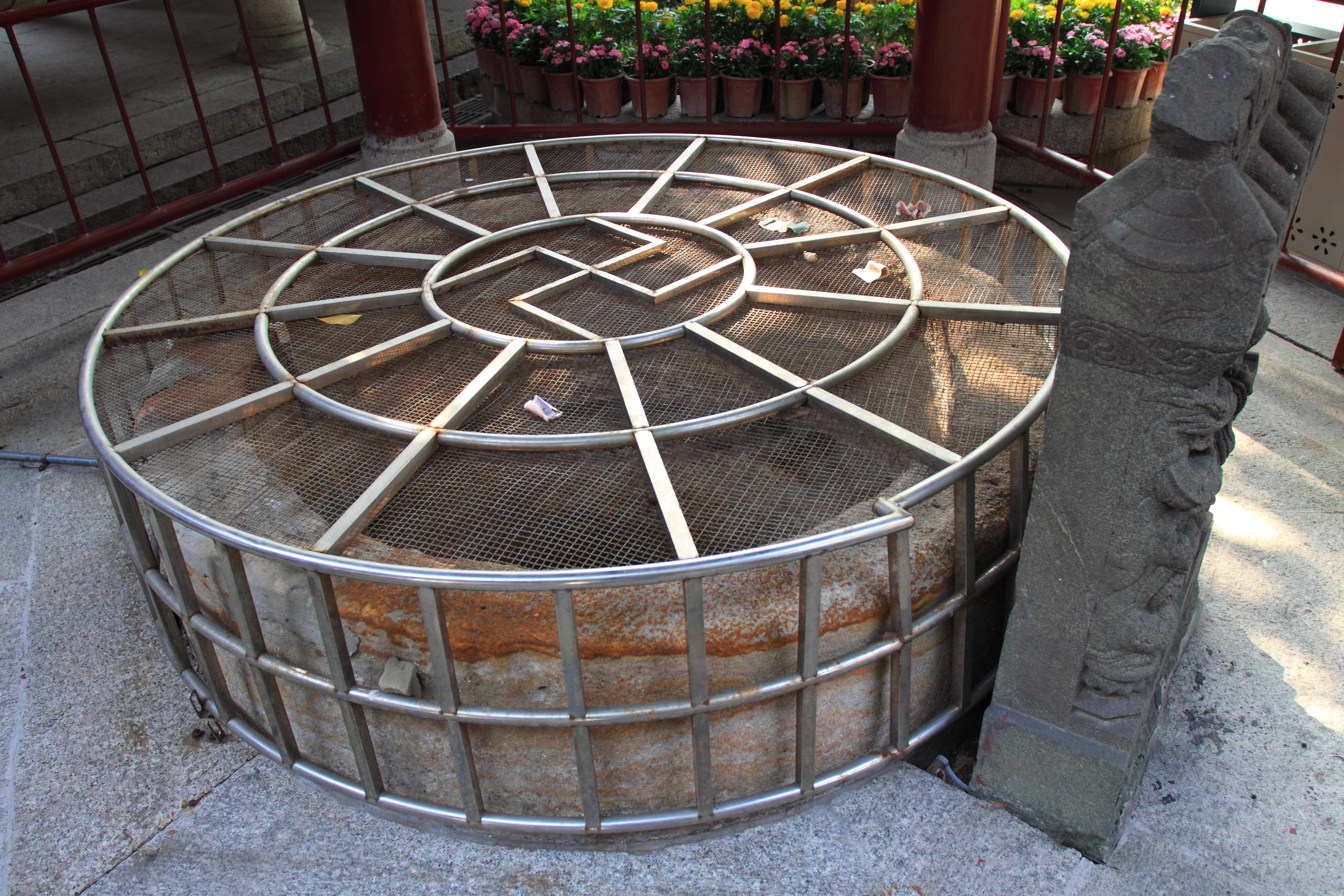

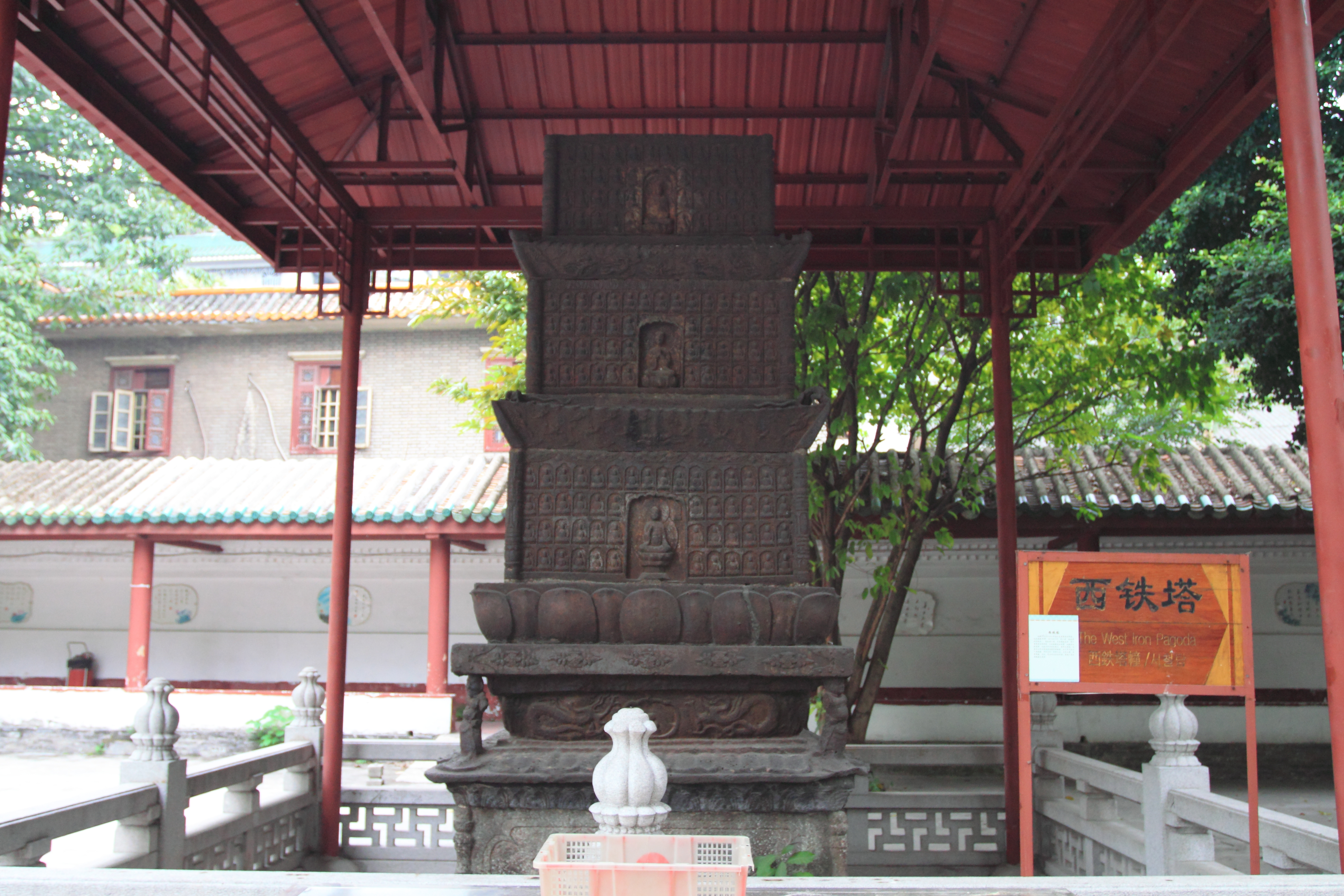
West Iron Pagoda

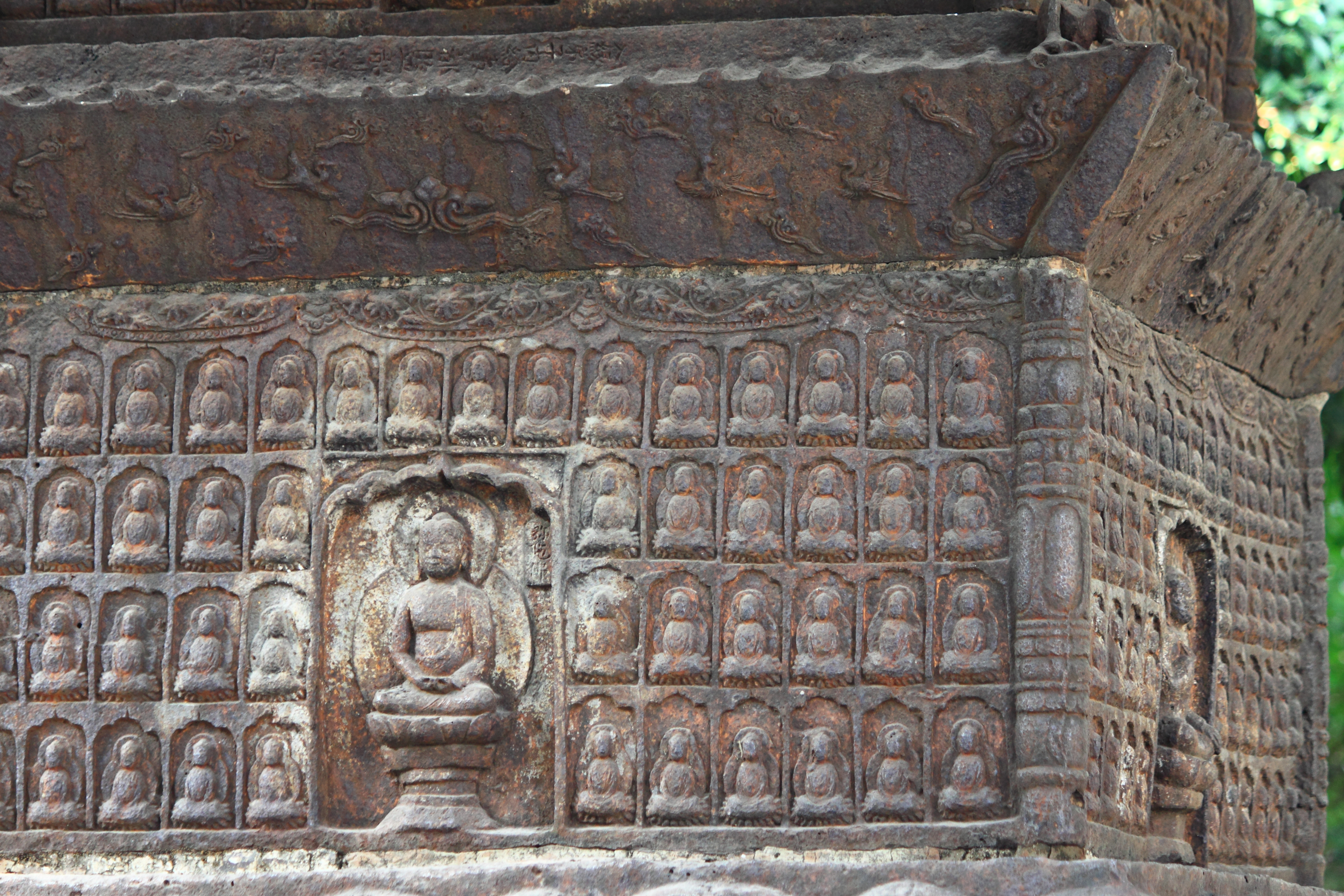
West Iron Pagoda

== See also ==
- Chinese Buddhism
- List of Buddhist temples
- Six Banyan Temple
- Hualin Temple (Guangzhou)
- Hoi Tong Monastery
- Benhuan
