= Temple of the Six Banyan Trees =

Buddhist temple in Guangzhou, China

Temple of the Six Banyan Trees 六榕寺
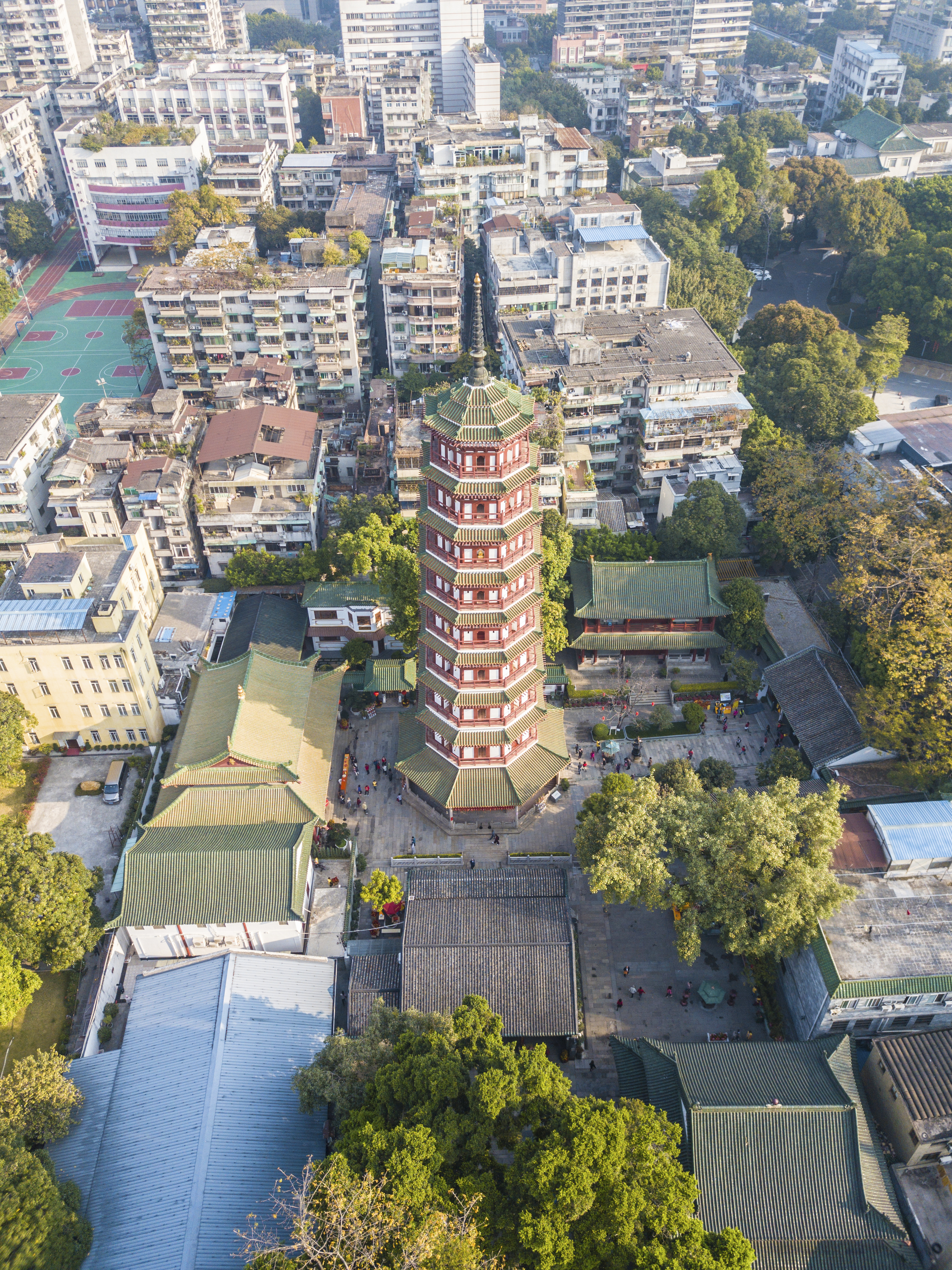
- The Temple's pagoda

Religion
- Affiliation: Buddhism

Location
- Location: Guangzhou, Guangdong
- Country: People's Republic of China
- Interactive map of Temple of the Six Banyan Trees 六榕寺
- Coordinates: 23.128185°N 113.260642°E

Architecture
- Completed: 537 AD

Temple of the Six Banyan Trees
- Chinese: 六榕寺
Transcriptions
Standard Mandarin
- Hanyu Pinyin: Liùróng sì
- IPA: [ljǒʊɻʊ̌ŋ sɨ̂]
Yue: Cantonese
- Yale Romanization: Luhk-yùhng jih
- Jyutping: Luk6 jung4 Zi6*2

The Temple of the Six Banyan Trees or Liurong Temple is a Buddhist temple in Guangzhou, China, originally built in AD 537.

The temple's proximity to foreign consulates in Guangzhou has made it a regular destination for families participating in the international adoption of children from China. Typically families receive blessings for their newly adopted children at this temple in front of the statue of Guanyin.

== History ==
The Baozhuangyan Temple was first constructed by the monk Tanyu under orders from Emperor Wu of the Liang in AD 537. It was constructed to house the relics of Cambodian Buddhist saints which had been brought to Panyu (modern Guangzhou).

The temple was burned down and rebuilt during the Northern Song dynasty. Around the same time, Su Shi composed a poem "Six Banyans" (Liu Rong) in honor of a visit to the temple. It was since renamed in honor of the famous poem.

The Flower Pagoda, the main structure of the temple, was built in 1097 and was named for its colorful exterior. The structure that had been there before had a square base, but the Flower Pagoda was designed with an octagonal one. It was rebuilt again in 1373 after another fire in the early Ming dynasty period and restored in 1900.

== Gallery ==
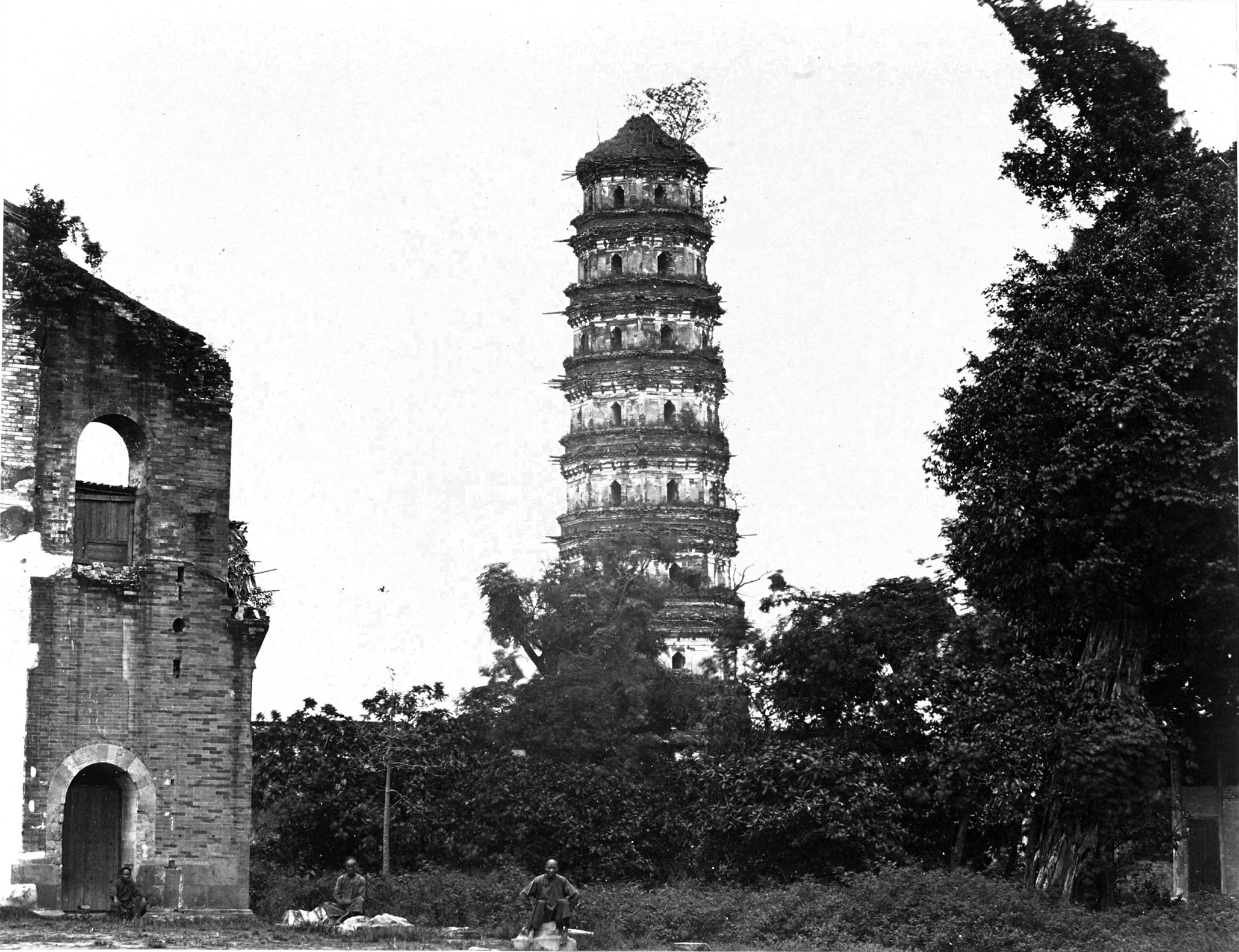
An 1863 Lai Afong photograph showing the pagoda in ruins before it was repaired.

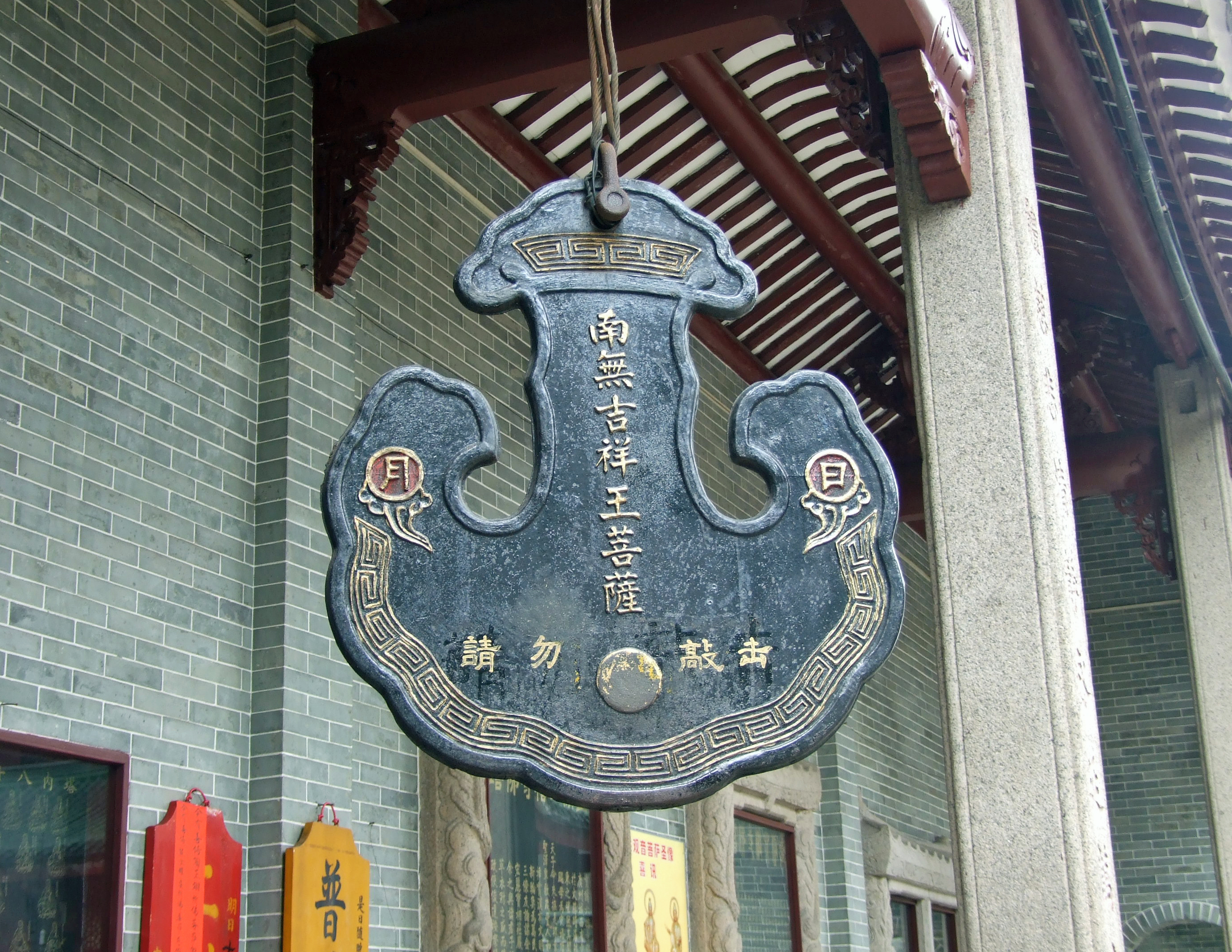
A temple artifact

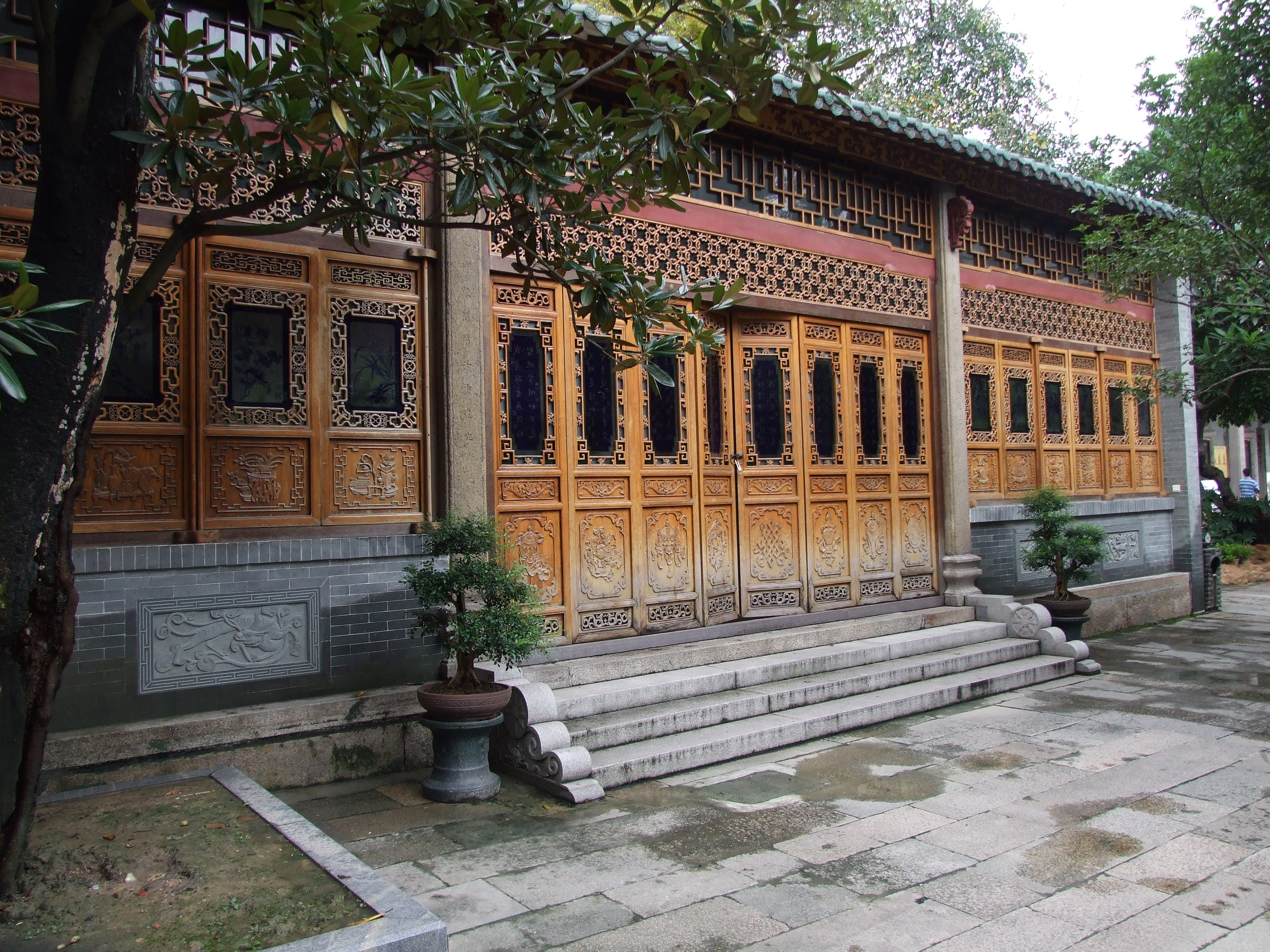
Behind the temple

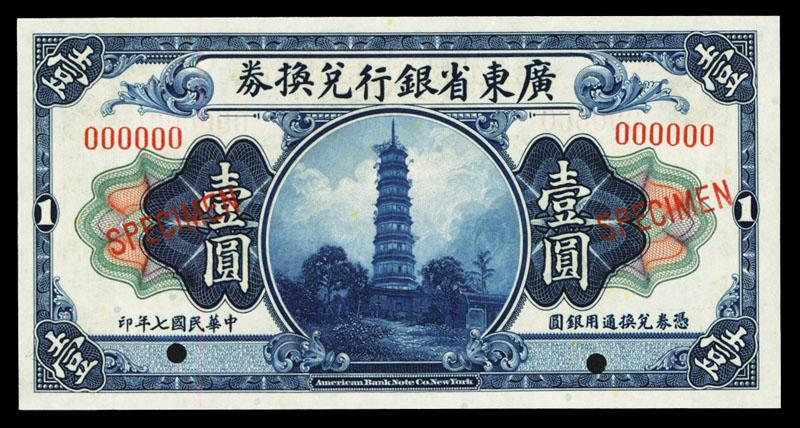
Depicted on a 1918 Kwangtung Provincial Bank 1 dollar specimen banknote

== See also ==
- Chinese Buddhism
- List of Buddhist temples
- Guangxiao Temple (Guangzhou)
- Hualin Temple (Guangzhou)
- Ocean Banner Temple
