= Temple of the Five Immortals =

Temple of the Five Immortals, Five Immortals Temple, or Temple of the Five Genii may refer to

- Temple of the Five Immortals (Shiyan), in Hubei, China
- Temple of the Five Immortals (Guangzhou), in Guangdong, China

== See also ==
- Hualin Temple (Guangzhou), or Temple of the Five Hundred Genii, in Guangzhou, China.
