= Mastermind =

Mastermind, Master Mind or The Mastermind may refer to:

== Fictional characters ==
- Mastermind (Jason Wyngarde), a supervillain in Marvel Comics, a title also held by his daughters:
  - Martinique Jason, the first daughter and successor of the Mastermind
  - Lady Mastermind, the second daughter and successor of the Mastermind
- Mastermind (computer), a character in Marvel Comics' Captain Britain
- Mastermind, an enemy of the Challengers of the Unknown in DC Comics
- Mastermind, the leader of the Ministry of Pain in "Fallen Arches", season 3, episode 1a of The Powerpuff Girls (1998) (2000)
- Master Mind, an Image Comics villain who first appeared in Invincible #31 (April 2006)

== Literature ==
- The Master Mind; or, The Key to Mental Power Development and Efficiency, a 1913 non-fiction book by William Walker Atkinson, writing as Theron Q. Dumont
- "The Master Mind" (1913), a Semi-Dual short story by John Ulrich Giesy
- The Master Mind (1913), a novel by Marvin Dana, a novelization of the 1913 play by Daniel D. Carter
- The Master-Mind (1919), a novel by Fergus Hume
- "Master Mind" (comics), a comic strip in British comic Buster
- Mastermind: How to Think Like Sherlock Holmes, a 2013 non-fiction book by Maria Konnikova
- The Mastermind: Drugs. Empire. Murder. Betrayal., a 2019 non-fiction book by Evan Ratliff
- Masterminds, a novel series by Gordon Korman

== Film and TV ==
=== Films ===
- Master Minds (1949 film), a 1949 American comedy film in The Bowery Boys series
- Mastermind (1976 film), a Charlie Chan spoof feature film, released in 1976
- Masterminds (1997 film), an American action comedy
- Masterminds (2013 film), a direct to DVD film
- Masterminds (2016 film), an American comedy film
- The Master Mind (1914 film), an American crime/drama film, based on a 1913 play
- The Master Mind (1920 film), a lost American silent crime drama, also based on the play
- The Mastermind (2025 film), a film by Kelly Reichardt
- Wallander: Mastermind, a 2005 Swedish film
- Master Mind (2015 film), an Indian Kannada-language film
- Master Mind, the working title of the 2010 American animated superhero film Megamind

=== Television ===
- Mastermind (British game show), a British quiz show
  - Mastermind India, an Indian quiz show based on the British show
  - Mastermind (Irish game show), an Irish quiz show based on the British show
  - Mastermind (Australian game show), an Australian version of the show
- Masterminds (Canadian TV series), a true crime documentary
- Masterminds (quiz bowl), an American TV show
- Master Minds (game show), a successor to Best Ever Trivia Show
- Mastermind (audio drama), a 2013 Doctor Who drama

== Music ==
- Mastermind (American band), a progressive rock band
- Dr. Mastermind, an American heavy metal band
- Herbie the Mastermind, a British DJ

=== Albums ===
- Mastermind (Tina Cousins album), 2005
- Mastermind (Monster Magnet album), 2010
- Mastermind (Rick Ross album), 2014
- Mastermind (EP), by Beast, 2010

=== Songs ===
- Mastermind (song), a song by Taylor Swift from the 2022 album Midnights
- "Mastermind", a song by Megadeth from the 1997 album Cryptic Writings
- "Mastermind", a song by Mike Oldfield from the 1999 album The Millennium Bell
- "Mastermind", a song by Deltron 3030 from the 2000 album Deltron 3030
- "Mastermind", a song by Nas from the 2002 album God's Son
- "Mastermind", a song by Mindless Self Indulgence from the 2008 album If

== Other uses ==
- Mastermind (board game), a classic board game
- Mastermind (role variant), in the Keirsey Temperament Sorter
- Mastermind Toys, a Canadian chain of toy stores
- Mastermind School, in Dhaka, Bangladesh

== See also ==
- Genius (disambiguation)
- Mastermind group, a peer-to-peer mentoring concept
- Criminal mastermind, or crime boss
