= Evil Genius (book series) =

Book series

The Evil Genius book series is a collection of paperback publications published by McGraw-Hill/TAB Electronics.

== Books already published ==
Evil Genius collection in the chronological order of published release date:

=== 2004 ===
- January 23 - 123 Robotics Experiments for the Evil Genius by Myke Predko
- March 12 - Electronic Gadgets for the Evil Genius by Robert E. Iannini
- November 24 - Electronic Circuits for the Evil Genius by Dave Cutcher

=== 2005 ===
- June 21 - 123 PIC Microcontroller Experiments for the Evil Genius by Myke Predko
- September 15 - Mechatronics for the Evil Genius: 25 Build-it-Yourself Projects by Newton Braga
- November 22 - 50 Awesome Auto Projects for the Evil Genius by Gavin Harper
- December 20 - MORE Electronic Gadgets for the Evil Genius: 40 NEW Build-it-Yourself Projects by Robert Iannini
- December 22 - Bionics for the Evil Genius: 25 Build-it-Yourself Projects by Newton Braga

=== 2006 ===
- January 20 - Electronics Sensors for the Evil Genius: 54 Electrifying Projects by Thomas Petruzzellis
- June 19 - 101 Spy Gadgets for the Evil Genius by Brad Graham, Kathy McGowan
- August 30 - 50 Model Rocket Projects for the Evil Genius by Gavin D. J. Harper
- October 20 - Electronic Games for the Evil Genius by Thomas Petruzzellis
- December 20 - 25 Home Automation Projects for the Evil Genius by Jerri Ledford
- December 22 - PC Mods for the Evil Genius by Jim Aspinwall

=== 2007 ===
- April 20 - 101 Outer Space Projects for the Evil Genius by Dave Prochnow
- June 22 - Solar Energy Projects for the Evil Genius by Gavin D. J. Harper
- September 19 - 51 High-Tech Practical Jokes for the Evil Genius by Brad Graham, Kathy McGowan
- September 24 - 22 Radio and Receiver Projects for the Evil Genius by Thomas Petruzzellis

=== 2008 ===
- March 28 - Programming Video Games for the Evil Genius by Ian Cinnamon
- April 29 - Fuel Cell Projects for the Evil Genius by Gavin D. J. Harper
- May 13 - Bike, Scooter, and Chopper Projects for the Evil Genius by Brad Graham, Kathy McGowan
- August 6 - 46 Science Fair Projects for the Evil Genius by Bob Bonnet, Dan Keen
- September 17 - 40 Telephone Projects for the Evil Genius by Thomas Petruzzellis

=== 2009 ===
- January 14 - 50 Green Projects for the Evil Genius by Jamil Shariff
- March 21 - 125 Physics Projects for the Evil Genius by Jerry Silver
- September 16 - Mind Performance Projects for the Evil Genius by Brad Graham, Kathy McGowan

=== 2010 ===
- June 21 - Holography Projects for the Evil Genius by Gavin Harper
- July 28 - 30 Arduino Projects for the Evil Genius by Simon R Monk
- August 12 - PICAXE Microcontroller Projects for the Evil Genius by Ron Hackett
- August 12 - Recycling Projects for the Evil Genius by Russel Gehrke
- September 24 - Electronic Circuits for the Evil Genius 2/E by Dave Cutcher

=== 2011 ===
- January 18 - tinyAVR Microcontroller Projects for the Evil Genius by Dhananjay Gadre
- May 3 - 15 Dangerously Mad Projects for the Evil Genius by Simon R Monk
- September 30 - 101 Spy Gadgets for the Evil Genius 2/E by Brad Graham, Kathy McGowan
- November 15 - Arduino + Android Projects for the Evil Genius: Control Arduino with Your Smartphone or Tablet by Simon Monk

=== 2013 ===
- May 31 - 30 Arduino Projects for the Evil Genius 2/E by Simon Monk
- August 16 - Electronic Gadgets for the Evil Genius 2/E by Robert Iannini
- September 4 - Raspberry Pi Projects for the Evil Genius by Donald Norris

=== 2014 ===
- September 29 - 30 BeagleBone Black Projects for the Evil Genius by Christopher Rush

=== 2016 ===
- May 30 - Raspberry Pi Electronic Projects for the Evil Genius by Donald Norris
- December 16 - DIY Drones for the Evil Genius: Design, Build, and Customize Your Own Drones by Ian Cinnamon, Romi Kadri, Fitz Tepper

=== 2017 ===
- August 4 - 20 Makey Makey Projects for the Evil Genius by Aaron Graves
- December 1 - Arduino and Raspberry Pi Sensor Projects for the Evil Genius by Robert Chin

== Sources ==
- https://web.archive.org/web/20111209081628/http://www.mhprofessional.com/category/?cat=4205
