= Gavin Harper =

British writer

Gavin D. J. Harper FRSA
- Born: 11 December 1986 (age 39); Harold Wood, Greater London, England
- Education: Open University; University of East London; Loughborough University; Keele University; Cardiff University
- Employer: University of Birmingham
- Known for: Author

Gavin D. J. Harper (born 1986) is a technology author based in Machynlleth, Wales.

== Biography ==
He left school aged 16 to work for a large engineering company before studying for A levels. Aged 16 he contacted the Open University and enrolled on a degree course in technology and, at the same time, started writing his first book 50 Awesome Auto Projects for the Evil Genius. At the time, the Open University believed he was the youngest person to hold a full Open University degree, (However, he has since been overtaken by 16 year old Cameron Thompson.) He later studied for a master's degree in sustainable architecture with the University of East London. He read for his PhD at Cardiff University.

He is a member of the National Energy Foundation's Advisory Council

== Writing ==
His works have been translated into Italian, Chinese and Korean.

== Books ==
- Harper, Gavin D. J. (2009). Domestic Solar Energy: A Guide for the Homeowner. Ramsbury: Crowood Press (UK). ISBN 978-1-84797-060-2.
- Bull, Jamie; Harper, Gavin D. J. (19 January 2011). Small-Scale Wind Power Generation. Crowood Press (UK). ISBN 978-1-84797-210-1.
- Starbuck, Jon; Harper, Gavin (19 November 2008). Run Your Diesel Vehicle on Biofuels: A Do-It-Yourself Manual : A Do-It-Yourself Manual. Mcgraw-hill. ISBN 0-07-160043-4.
- Harper, Gavin (21 June 2010). Holography Projects for the Evil Genius. New York: McGraw-Hill Education TAB. ISBN 978-0-07-162400-8.
- Harper, Gavin D J (16 May 2008). Fuel Cell Projects for the Evil Genius. McGraw-Hill Education TAB. ISBN 0-07-149659-9.
- Harper, Gavin (22 June 2007). Solar Energy Projects for the Evil Genius. Foreword By Willie Nelson. New York: McGraw Hill Professional. ISBN 0-07-147772-1.
- Harper, Gavin D J (20 September 2006). 50 Model Rocket Projects for the Evil Genius. McGraw Hill Professional. ISBN 0-07-146984-2.
- Harper, Gavin (28 March 2006). Build Your Own Car PC. Mcgraw-hill. ISBN 0-07-146826-9.
- Harper, Gavin D J (13 December 2005). 50 Awesome Auto Projects for the Evil Genius. McGraw-Hill Education TAB. ISBN 0-07-145823-9.

=== Italian Translations ===
- Harper, Gavin D.J. (2008). L'energia solare e le sue applicazioni. Cinquanta progetti pratici (in Italian). ISBN 978-88-203-4121-3.

=== Chinese Translations ===
- 科学鬼才:全息技术应用41例. 人民邮电出版社 ISBN 9787115287885
- 酷车电子产品制作DIY:50项目. 科学出版社 ISBN 9787030185747
- 科学鬼才:太阳能技术应用50例 ISBN 9787115291325
- 科学鬼才 汽车电子制作50例 图例版 ISBN 9787115472694

=== Korean Translations ===
- 과학영재를 위한 50가지 태양에너지 프로젝트.
