= Auguste Borget =

French artist (1808–1877)

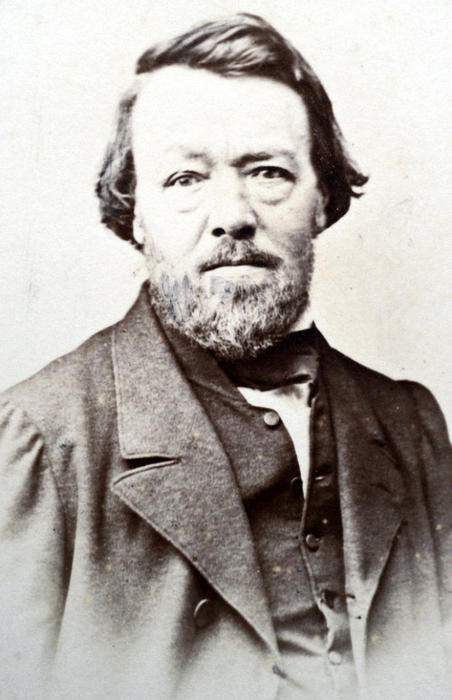
Portrait of Borget

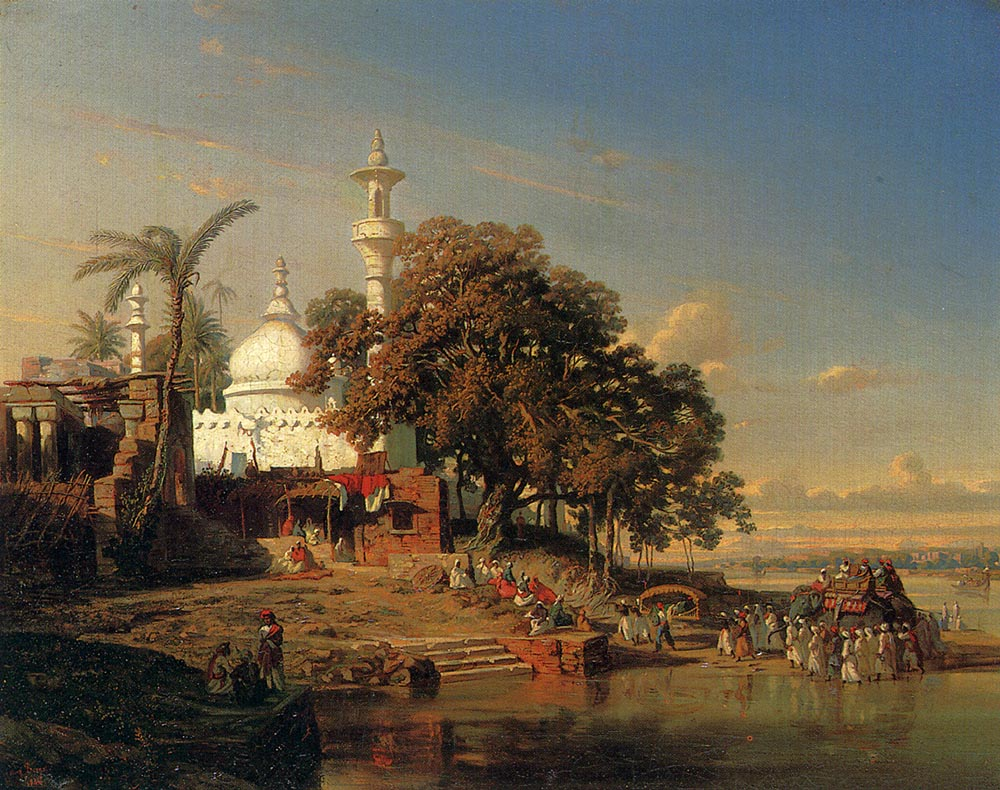
Auguste Borget's oil on canvas painting 'An Indian Mosque on the Hooghly River near Calcutta', 1846

Auguste Borget (1808–1877) was a French artist known for his drawings and prints of exotic places, in particular China. He was born in 1808 in Issoudun, Indre. At age 21, he went to Paris where he became a close friend of Honoré de Balzac. Borget periodically exhibited at the Paris Salon from 1836 to 1859. Beginning in 1836, he traveled through North and South America before stopping briefly in Honolulu in May, 1838, on board the ship "Psyche", on a world tour. He went to Canton in September 1838 and stayed in the region for 10 months. While in Canton, he met the English artist George Chinnery, and they went on sketching trips together.

In July 1839 he visited Manila, Singapore and Calcutta. In 1840 he traveled widely in India, returning to Paris in the summer of that year. Borget’s sketches and watercolors from China were the basis for his most famous publication "Sketches of China and the Chinese", published in 1842. His book "La Chine ouverte" was illustrated with fine woodcut engravings. A major Salon of his original works, including watercolors and boldly executed oil paintings was held in Paris in 1843. Borget died in 1877.

The Hong Kong Museum of Art, the Honolulu Museum of Art, Musée Bertrand (Châteauroux, France), Musée de la Roche (Issoudun, France) and the National Museum of Singapore are among the public collections holding works by Auguste Borget.
