= Jerry Silver =

American neuroscientist and professor

- Citizenship: American
- Education: Case Western Reserve University (Ph.D., 1974)
- Awards: Reeve-Irvine Medal (2003)
- Scientific career
- Fields: Neuroscience
- Workplaces: Case Western Reserve University

Jerry Silver was an American neuroscientist and professor in the Department of Neurosciences at Case Western Reserve University School of Medicine. He is known for his research using rat models to develop treatments for spinal cord injuries. He became a fellow of the American Association for the Advancement of Science in 2011.
