= Hualin Temple (Guangzhou) =

Buddhist temple in Guangzhou, China

Coordinates: 23.1190°N 113.2410°E

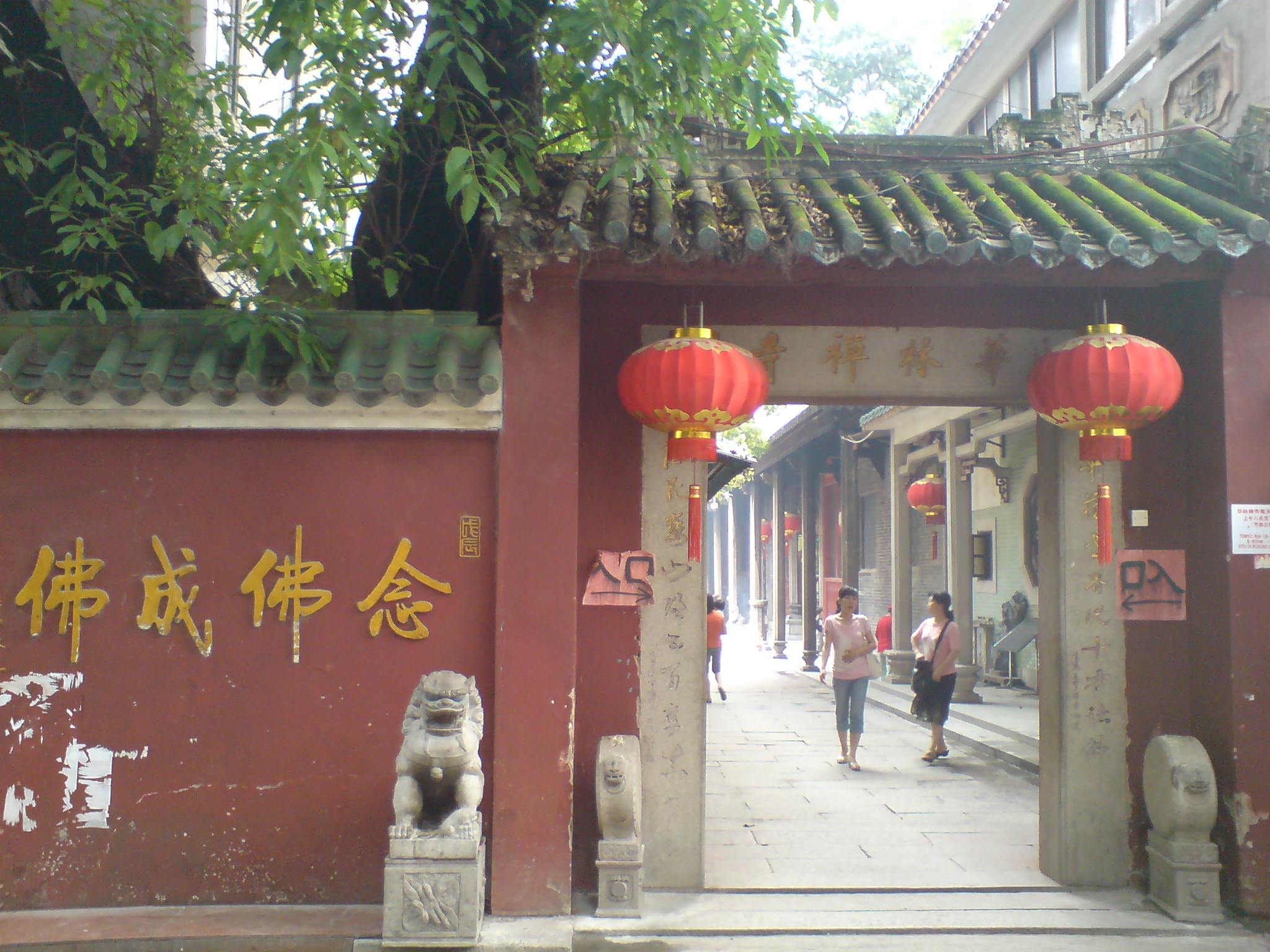
- Main entrance
- Traditional Chinese: 華林寺
- Simplified Chinese: 华林寺
- Literal meaning: Flourishing Forest Temple; Temple of the Flowery Forest
Transcriptions
Standard Mandarin
- Hanyu Pinyin: Huálín Sì
Yue: Cantonese
- Jyutping: Waa⁴-Lam⁴ Zi²

Xilai Monastery
- Traditional Chinese: 西來庵
- Simplified Chinese: 西来庵
Transcriptions
Standard Mandarin
- Hanyu Pinyin: Xīlái Ān
Yue: Cantonese
- Jyutping: Sai¹-Loi⁴ Am¹

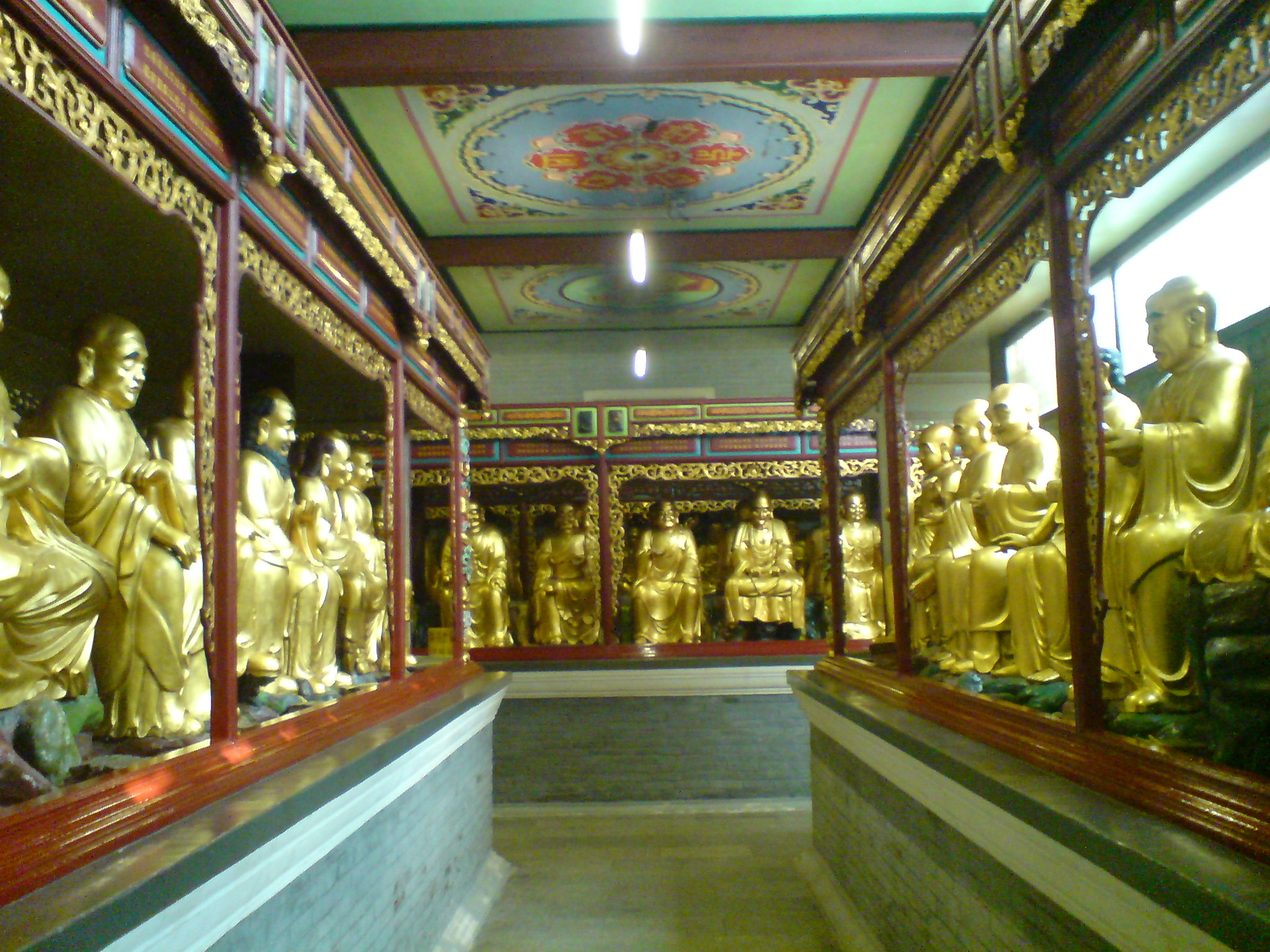
The Hall of the 500 Arhats

Hualin Temple, also known as the Temple of the Five Hundred Genii or Gods, or Hualinsi Buddhist Temple, is a Buddhist temple in Guangzhou, China.

== History ==
The Xilai Monastery was established in Panyu (now Guangzhou) by Emperor Wu of the Liang in the AD 520s. It is traditionally credited to the Buddhist missionary monk, Bodhidharma, but he may have arrived in China as early as the Liu Song.

The name was changed to the Hualin Temple by the Zen master Zongfu (宗符) during his rehabilitation of its grounds in 1655. (Note: Given in Chinese sources as the 12th year of the Shunzhi Era of the Qing Dynasty.) There used to be a Gilded Ashoka Pagoda (阿育王塔) and 500 arhats statues (五百羅漢像) but all of them were destroyed during cultural revolution.

== See also ==
- Chinese Buddhism
- List of Buddhist temples
- Guangxiao Temple (Guangzhou)
- Six Banyan Temple, also built in Guangzhou around the same time
- Ocean Banner Temple
- Hualinsi Buddhist Temple station, a metro station nearby
