= Genius by Stephen Hawking =

Genius by Stephen Hawking is a television series aired on PBS hosted by Stephen Hawking. It premiered on May 18, 2016, and ended on June 1, 2016, with only one season being produced before Hawking's death in 2018.

== Premise ==
Genius by Stephen Hawking is a series that first aired on PBS on Wednesdays, from May 18 to June 1, 2016. Professor Stephen Hawking challenges volunteers to think like geniuses and solve some of humanity's most enduring questions. What, Why, Where, are We (as in humanity) are covered, as well as Are We Alone and Can We Time Travel. Generally three volunteers with these questions are followed as they try to find the answers to their questions. The idea is to teach the volunteers and watchers how to think like a genius. All are G-rated TV hour episodes originally aired in pairs.

== Episodes ==
No.	Title	Original Air Date
1	"Can We Time Travel?"	May 18, 2016
2	"Are We Alone?"	May 18, 2016
3	"Why Are We Here?"	May 25, 2016
4	"Where Did the Universe Come From?"	May 25, 2016
5	"What Are We?"	June 1, 2016
6	"Where Are We?"	June 1, 2016
