= Social documentary photography =

Photography genre

Social documentary photography or concerned photography is the recording of what the world looks like, with a social and/or environmental focus. It is a form of documentary photography, with the aim to draw the public's attention to ongoing social issues. It may also refer to a socially critical genre of photography dedicated to showing the life of underprivileged or disadvantaged people.

== Characteristics of social documentary photography ==
Social documentary photography or concerned photography may often be devoted to social groups with socio-economic and cultural similarities, showing living or working conditions perceived as shameful, discriminatory, unjust or harmful. Examples include child labor, child neglect, homelessness, poverty among segments of society, impoverished children and the elderly, and hazardous working conditions. The poor, the social outcasts, or lower classes are portrayed in compassionate observation. The documentary power of the images is associated with the desire for political and social change.

== History ==
=== Beginnings in the UK ===
England was the birthplace of social documentary photography, given the advanced stage of industrialisation, and its impact on society. As early as in the mid-19th century the living conditions for the lower classes became the subject of studies, which were provided with graphic illustrations. Copied after photographies (invented in the 1830s), their truthfulness made a strong argument. In the 1840s and '50s the English journalist Henry Mayhew undertook a comprehensive survey on the working class and the poor in the city of London. The four volumes published between 1851 and 1862, titled London Labour and the London Poor, were illustrated with woodcut prints from daguerreotypes by Richard Beard. The images were simplified by isolating the figures and omitting most of the background. The pictures were accompanied by short descriptive captions and occasional suggestive acoustic impressions, like "The London Dust-Man", who shouts: "Dust Hoi! Dust Hoi!".

Street Life in London, published in 1877, was meant as a follow-up. The book introduced woodburytypes (first patended in the U.S. in 1864), that were able to reproduce the original photography almost perfectly. The images were taken by John Thomson, a Scottish photographer who previously had travelled 8000 miles through East Asia and published his yield in 1873. The collection of ethnographic photographs in Illustrations of China and Its People showed Thomson's interest in the social environment, although the people, who had to stand still for a few seconds, were yet often photographed in studio-like environments. His 36 photographs of London were initially issued in 1877/78 in twelve monthly installments as single prints with additional text sheets, and combined into a book a year later. The text was written by outspoken left-wing writer Adolphe Smith (himself a photographer), and each picture had a caption just like in Mayhew's volumes; such subheadings became the standard for journalistic photography.

Thomas Annan, another Scottish photographer, was commissioned by the Glasgow City Improvement Trust to document an innercity slum before it was demolished. He published his work under the title Photographs of the Old Closes and Streets of Glasgow, 1868–77. To avoid the pictures to appear ghostly deserted, due to the long exposure times of the photographic plates, he oftentimes let children pose as staffage. Like Thomson, who later earned his living by portraying the high society, Annan was actually known for his photographic reproductions of art and architectural photography.

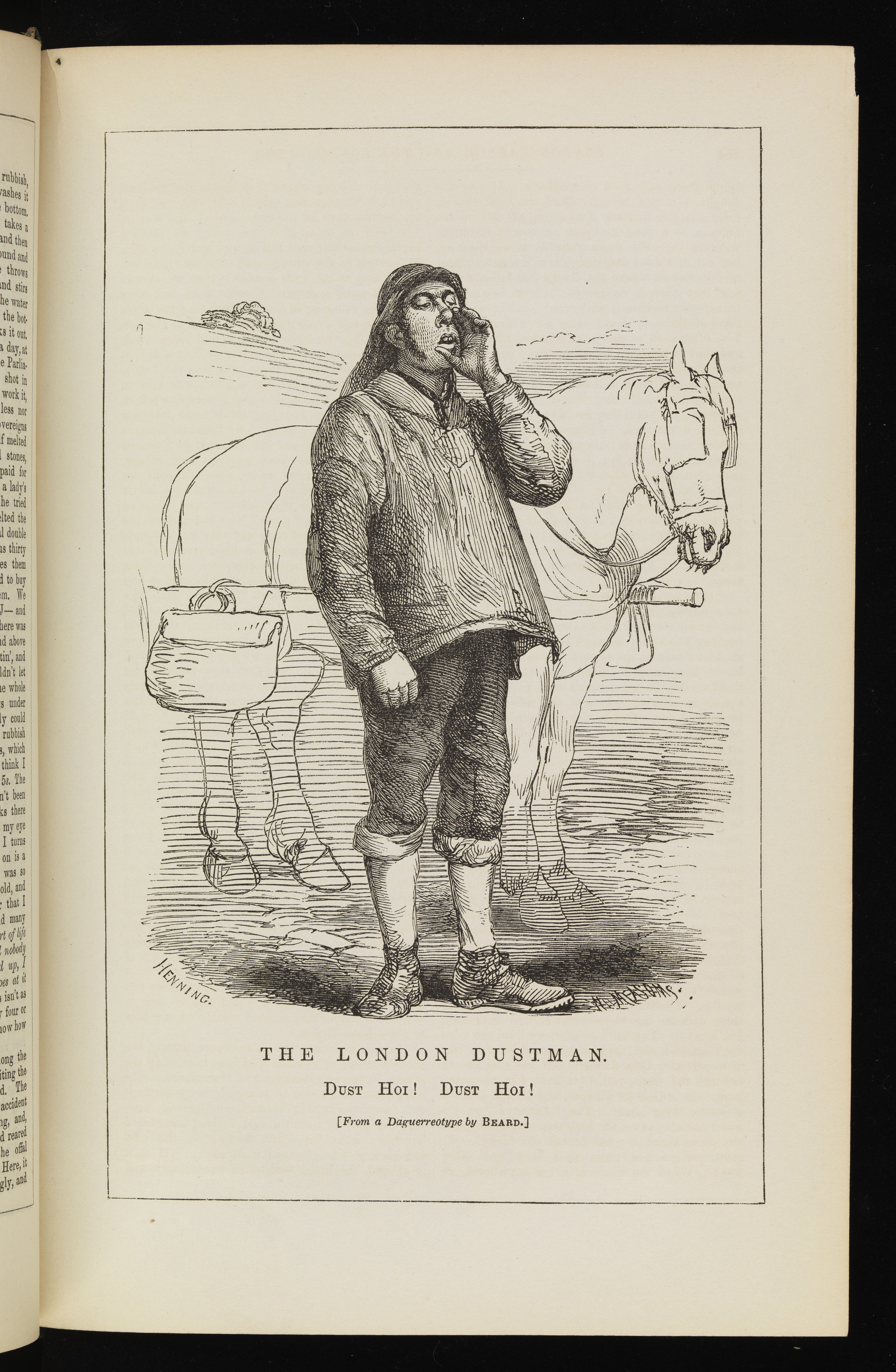
"The London Dust-Man", woodcut print from a daguerreotype by Richard Beard, 1851

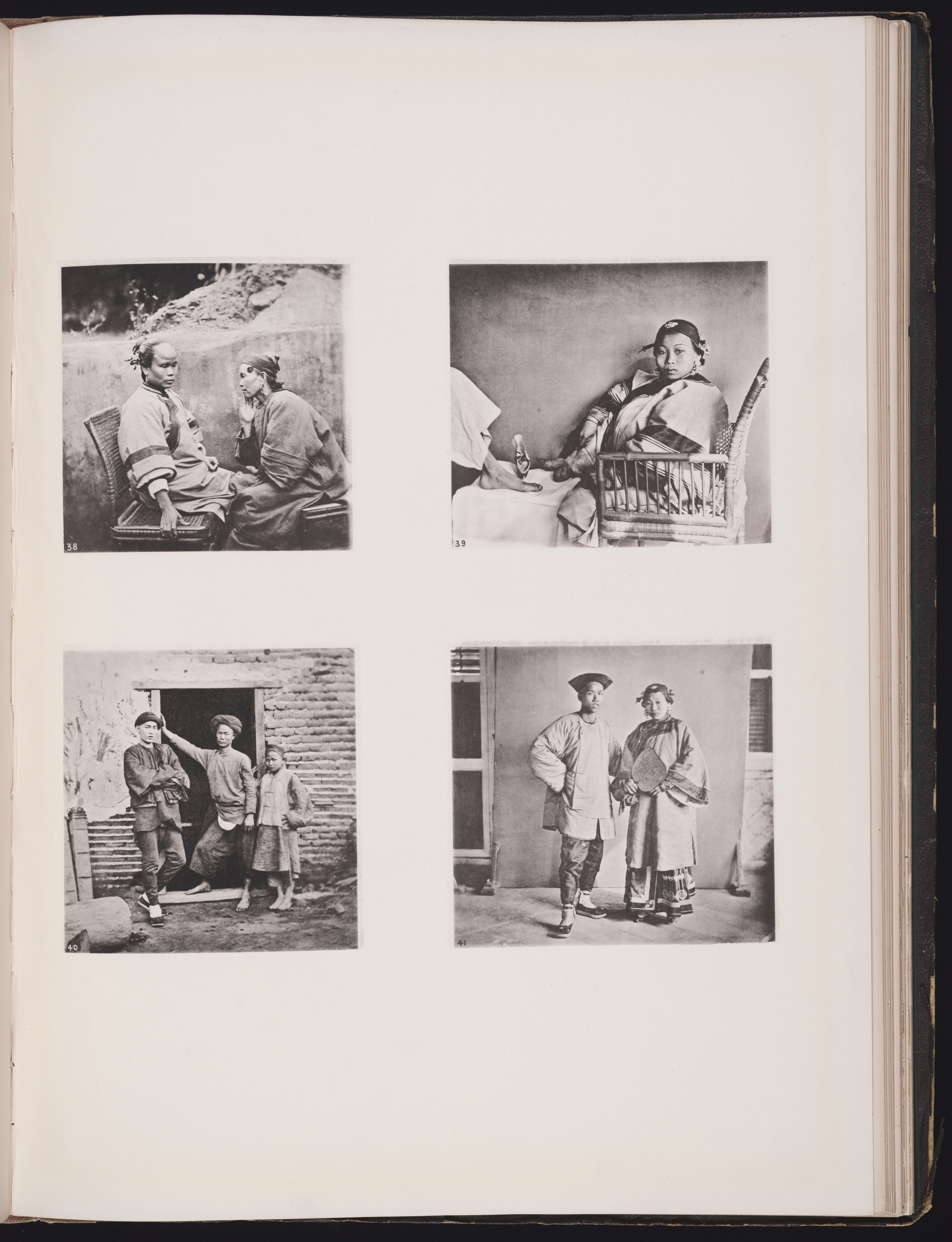
John Thomson, "Amoy People", from Illustrations of China and Its People, 1873

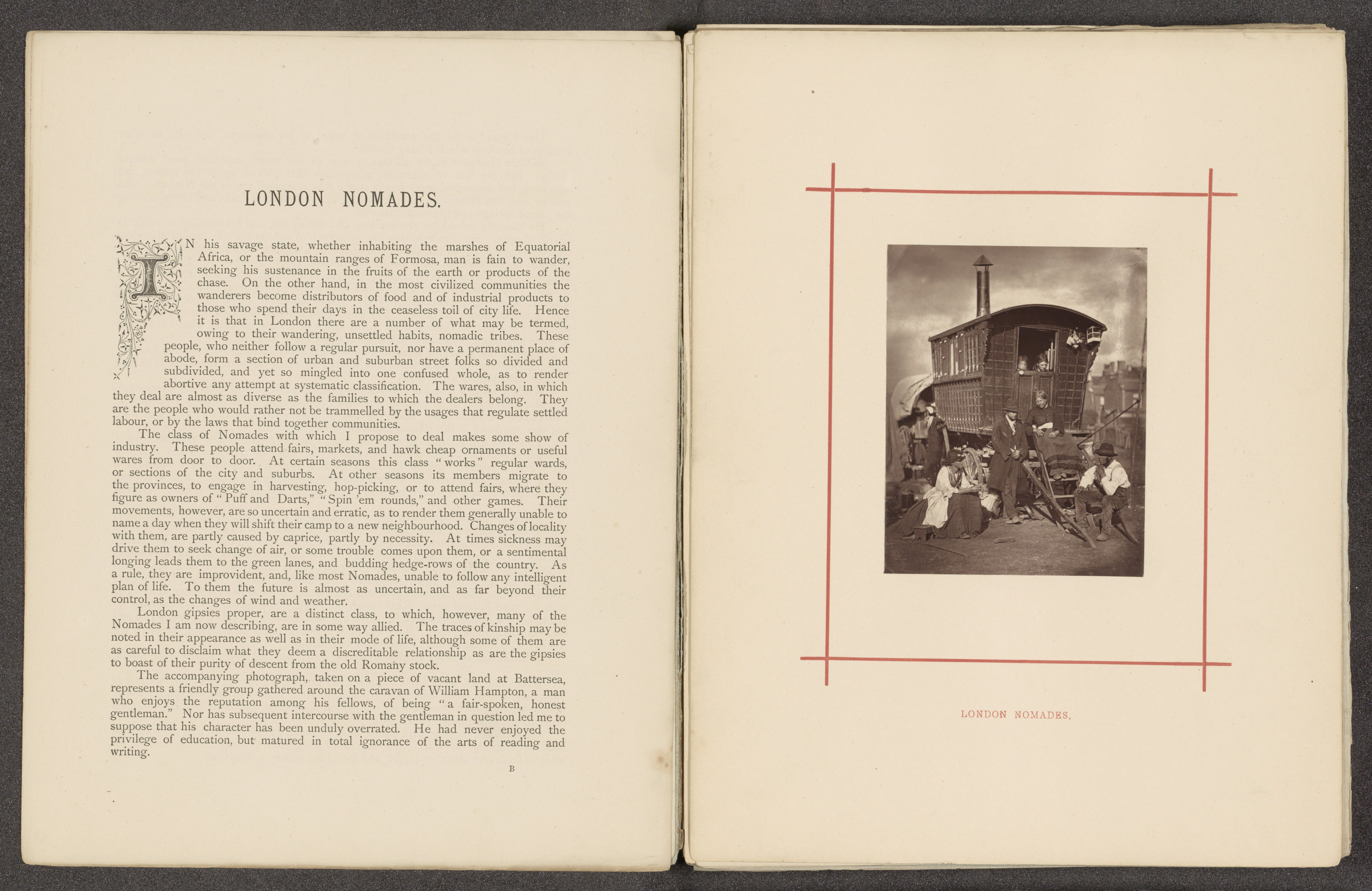
"London Nomads." Chapter and illustration in Street Life in London, 1877

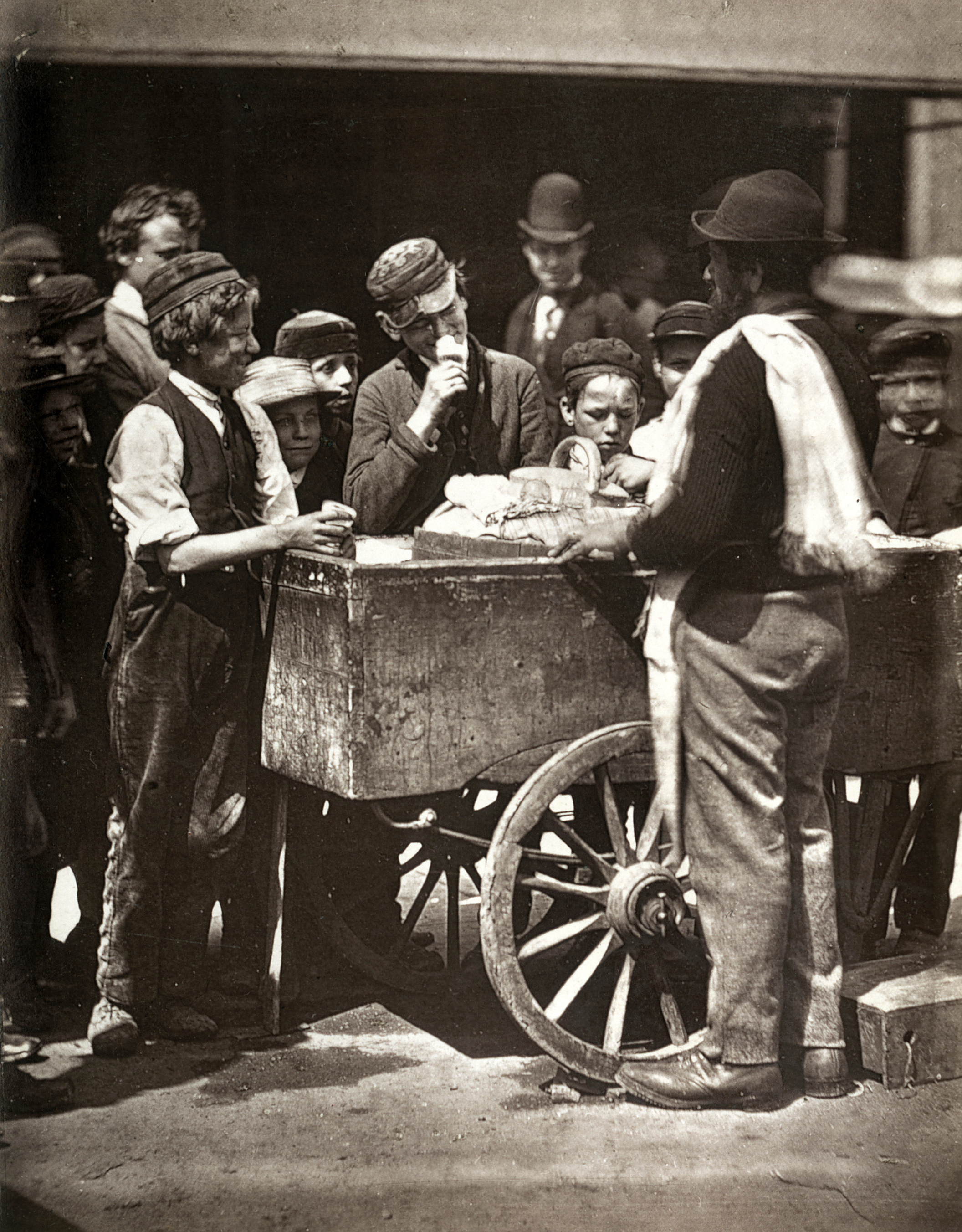
"Halfpenny Ices", from Street Life in London, 1877, woodburytype after a photograph by John Thomson

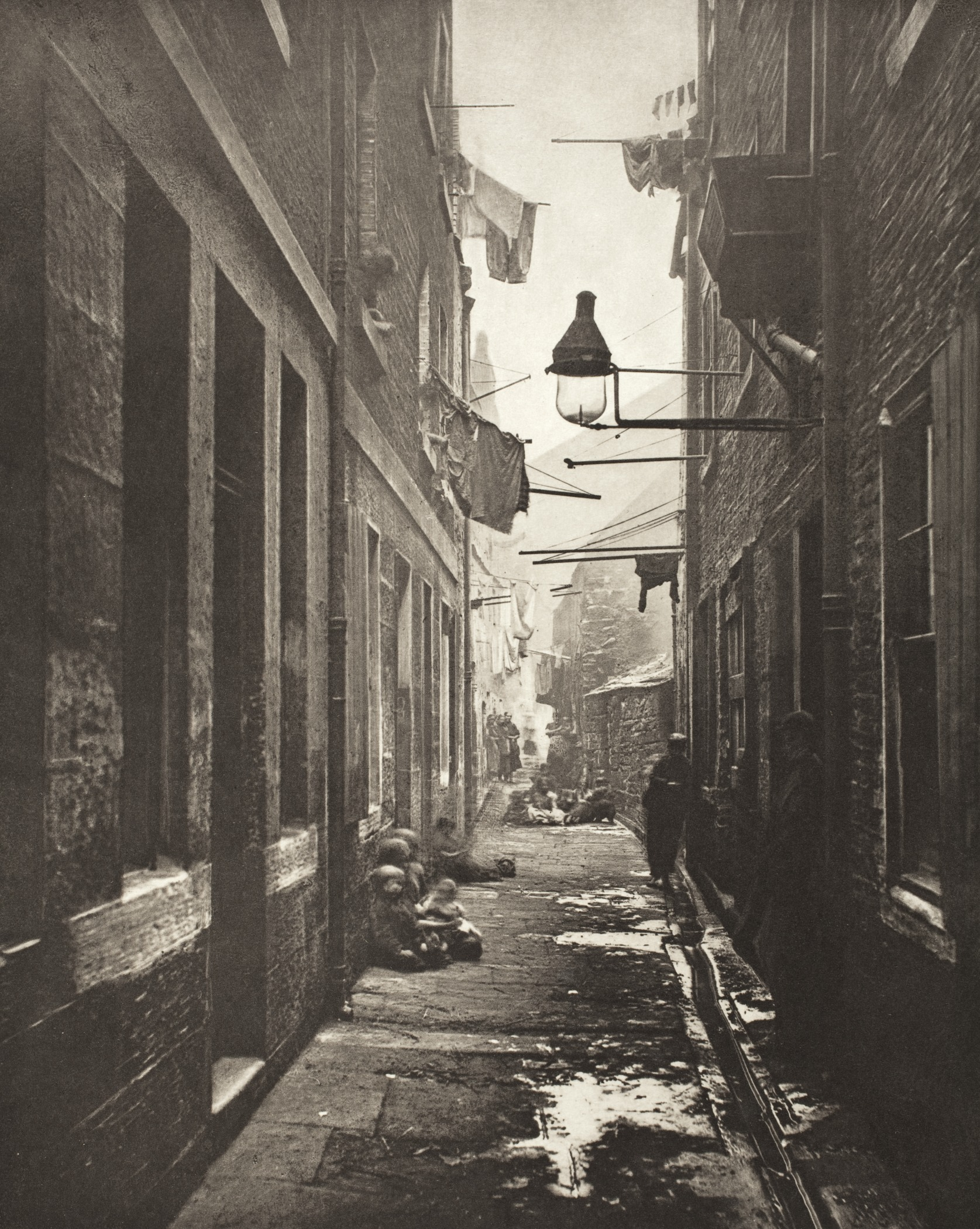
"High Street", print, 1900 (incl. in Old Closes and Streets of Glasgow, 1868–77)

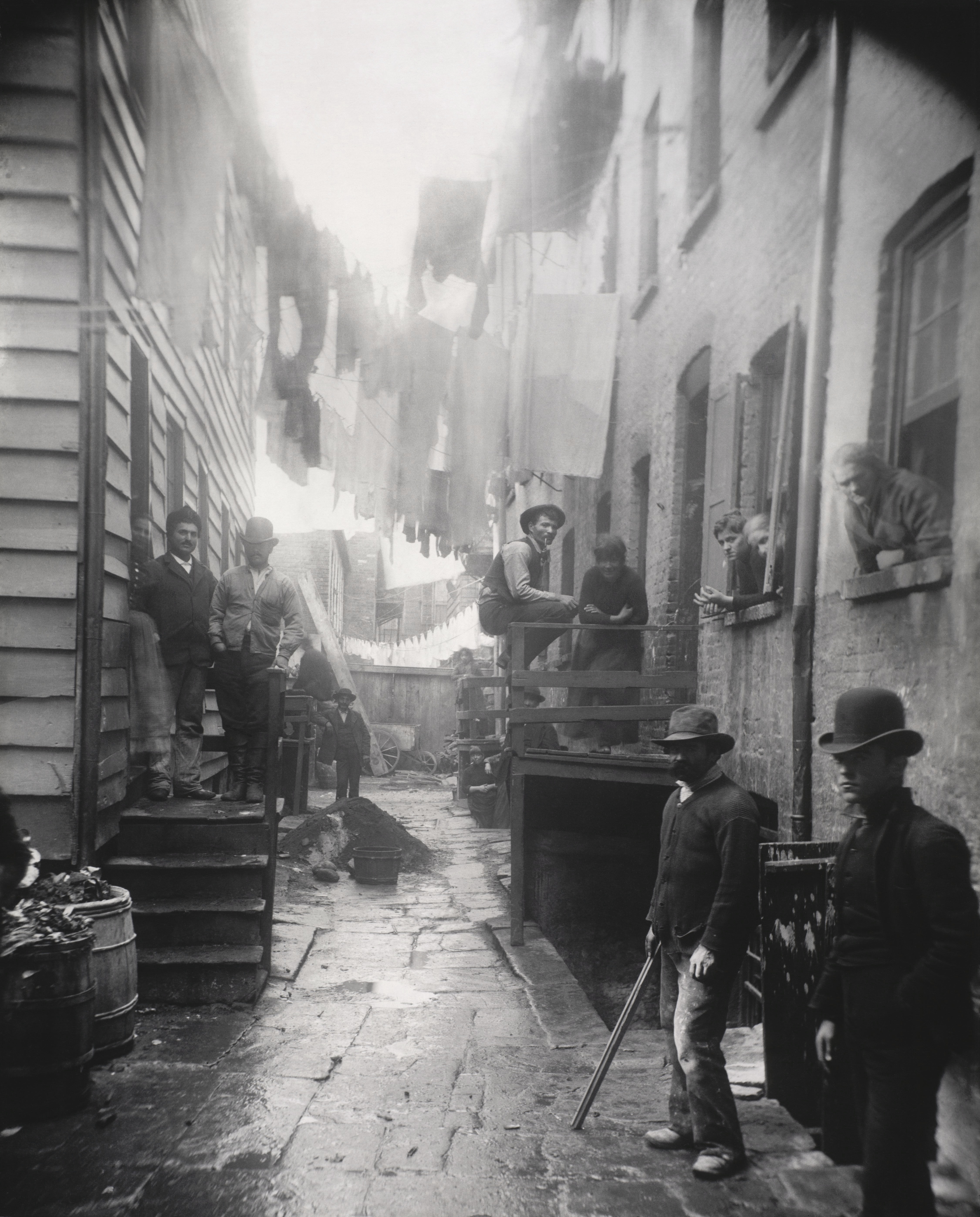
Jacob Riis, Bandits' Roost, 59 1/2 Mulberry Street, from How the Other Half Lives, 1888

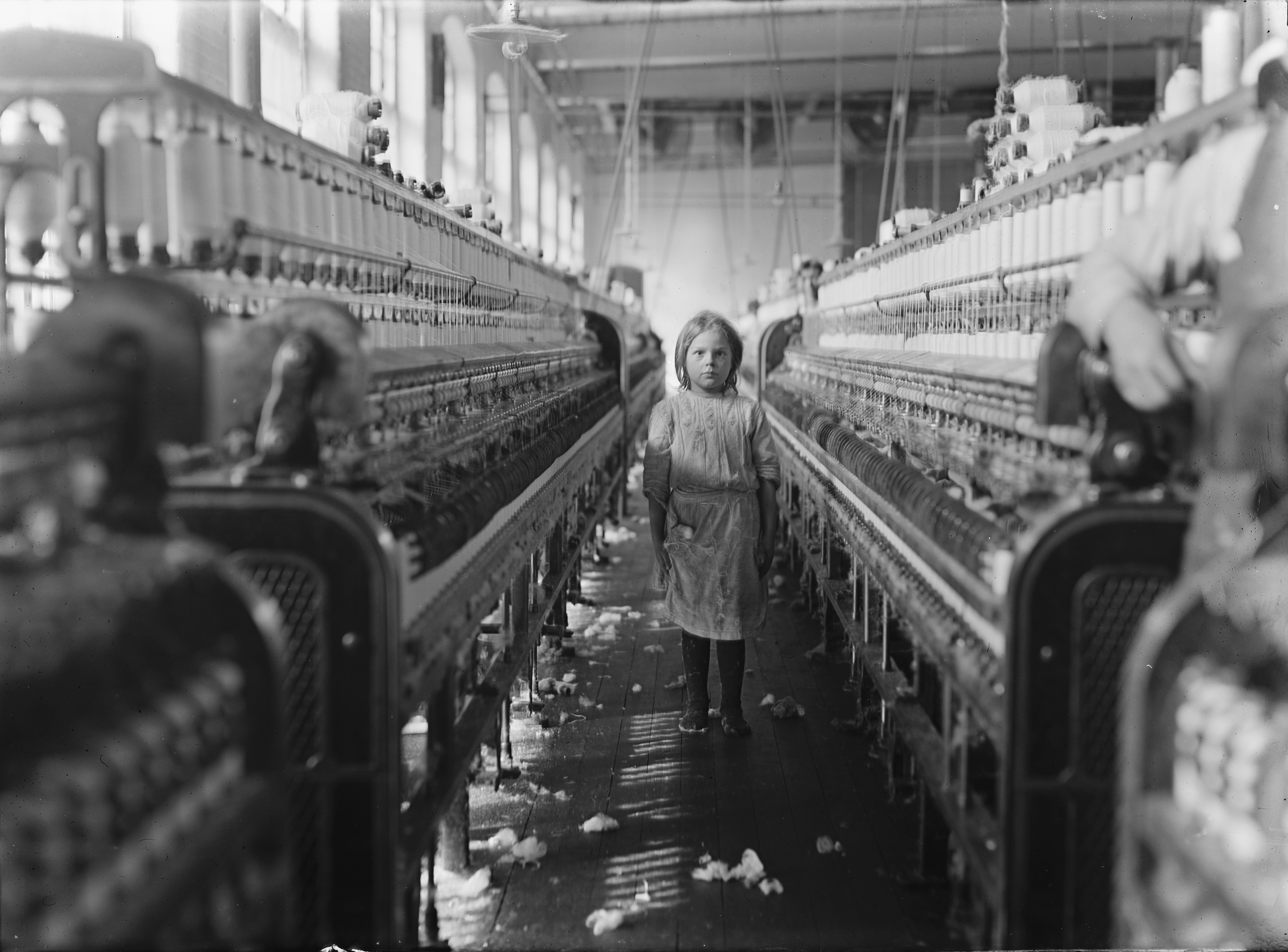
Lewis Hine, child laborer, USA, 1908

=== Jacob Riis and Lewis Hine in the US ===
In the United States two photographers got involved at the end of the 19th century in favor of people on the margins of society, Jacob Riis and Lewis Hine. For them the camera was an instrument of accusation against social injustice. In 1890 Riis documented the living conditions of the unemployed and homeless in New York (How the Other Half Lives). He was also interested in the fate of immigrants, many of whom lived in extreme poverty in the New York slums. Riis clearly took sides for the people he photographed and appealed to the social conscience of society. In 1908 the National Child Labor Committee hired Hine, a sociology professor who advocated photography as an educational medium, to document child labor in American industry. In the early 20th century Hine would publish thousands of photographs designed to pull at the nation's heartstrings. Child labor was widespread in the U.S. in the early 20th century. Hine equally drew attention to the situation of immigrants. The work of Riis and Hine had political influence. Riis' commitment to the people in the Mulberry Bend neighborhood led to its demolition. The building of schools and educational programs can also be attributed to Riis. Hine's work culminated in a law against child labor, the Keating-Owen Act of 1916, which was repealed shortly after the entry of the U.S. into the First World War.

=== Photographs of the Great Depression ===
An English pioneer of socially committed photography is Bill Brandt. Brandt is particularly renowned for his experimental studies of the nude. He moved to England in 1931 and worked for several magazines, for which he traveled to the Midlands and to northern England and covered the aftermath of the Great Depression. In 1936 he published The English at Home, in which he portrayed the English class system.

A day laborer playing poker with his son near New Iberia, Louisiana, photographed by Russell Lee for the Farm Security Administration in October 1938.

Social documentary photography began to take further form through the photographic practice of the Farm Security Administration (FSA) in the USA. The FSA hired photographers and writers to report and document the plight of poor farmers. Under Roy Stryker, the Information Division of the FSA adopted a goal of "introducing America to Americans." Many noted Depression-era photographers were fostered by the FSA project, including Walker Evans, Dorothea Lange, and Gordon Parks. The photographers documented the situation of farmers, whose economic existence was threatened or destroyed, and created a new style with photographic documentation of social problems. For the FSA 250,000 images were taken, but only about half survive. These are now housed in the Prints and Photographs Division of the Library of Congress and online.

=== Post-war developments ===
After 1945 the dedicated, collectively organized social documentary photography no longer was able to gain ground, except in England, where the tradition lingered on a bit longer. The vigorous anti-communism of the McCarthy era had anathematized the engaged, liberal social documentary photography with the verdict of (leftist) evil. Even for great documentary photographers of the post-war era, such as Don McCullin, W. Eugene Smith or Mary Ellen Mark it was not easy to pursue a subject for a longer time. They were either lone fighters or had to supply stories for the large illustrated magazines (especially Life).

For journalists being involved in a political movement against a government, trying to document factual events, also run the risk to be biased and self-righteous. This wasn't the case with Peter Magubane, who began to work for Drum magazine in 1954, documenting the oppression and the fight against the Apartheid regime in South Africa (until 1994). After witnessing the Soweto riots in 1976 he got awarded and recognised by international media, subsequently getting his photographs to be seen worldwide, and raise awareness.

Bruce Davidson was granted the very first National Endowment for the Arts for photography in 1966. He used it to spend two years to get to know the people and living circumstances in a street in Spanish Harlem, he regularly saw from the elevated subway line. The miserable living conditions on East 100th Street, which was falling into disrepair, stood in the starkest contrast to the efforts of the US government to get to the moon. "We had to go into inner space not outer space: the inner space of our broken-down cities, in order to recover our humanity," Davidson said. To make a point he used a large 4×5 view camera with single sheets, instead of the usual 35 mm or mid-format gear of photojournalists and street photographers at the time (with 12 to 36 frames per roll). Consequently, he had to ask the people to sit for him, showing respect and trustworthiness. The photographs first appeared in The Sunday Times in April 1968, and was later published in expanded form simply as East 100th Street in 1970, which was a "sumptuous affair" causing critics calling it "'photo-slumming' or 'exploitation' of a black working-class neighborhood". Now it is a "dignified" classic.

Frenchman Marc Riboud was supported by Look to investigate in North Vietnam during the war. In 1970 he published an accessible book on North Vietnam comprising a pictorial portrait of the enemy state in a large spread of black-and-white images (often double pages) in eight chapters with almost no text, and a ninth with short descriptions of general aspects of the land, as well as biographies of Ho Chi Minh and Pham Van Dong by the US Office of Strategic Services, and finally their Declaration of Independence of Democratic Republic of Vietnam from 1945. The publication in his humanistic impetus delivered a counter-image to the gruesome images of combat and the concept of the evil enemy, for whom Riboud was an advocate.

British photojournalist Don McCullin specialised in examining the underside of society, and his photographs have depicted the unemployed, downtrodden and the impoverished. Journalistic works like on the 1968 starvation in Biafra during the Nigerian Civil War, his coverage of the Vietnam War, the The Troubles in Northern Ireland, and the victims of the African AIDS epidemic are hard-hitting and have certainly a prompting character.

Photojournalist and former war correspondent Eugene Smith was asked by the inhabitants of the Japanese fishing village of Minamata to document the severe effects of mercury poisoning through a chemical firm on their community. He lived there (with his Japanese-American partner) from 1971 on, participated in the research and in the fight for acknowledgement and compensation. A book was published in 1975 with 175 photographs and accompanying texts. Especially one of his pictures taken in Minamata became iconic, a mother in a bathtub holding her dysmorphic son in her arms, which was commonly associated with a Pietà (Tomoko and Mother in the Bath, 1971).

=== Since the mid-1970s and beyond ===
Aside from her work in India on prostitutes in Bombay and a circus community, Mary Ellen Mark was notable for her patience to gain the trust of the people she was interested in and her maintained contact with them over long periods of time. Some of her subjects included the patients in a mental hospital (Ward 81, 1979), the homeless family Damm, and the struggling 12-year old girl Tiny, who she then followed over 32 years (Streetwise, 1988, and Tiny: Streetwise Revisited, 2015). Mark said openly to her subjects that she made art, she wanted not the series but the single shot to endure.

Susan Meiselas is another woman photographer. She is strongly associated with the "humanistic-documentary tradition". She works foremost in Latin America, where she documented in controlled colour photographs the revolution in 1970s Nicaragua, for which she received the Robert Capa Gold Medal for Outstanding Reportage. A few years later she went to El Salvador, this time she worked in black-and-white. She got engaged as a book editor assembling the images of 30 photographers (El Salvador: Work of 30 Photographers, 1983). In collaboration with others she researched worldwide the obscure history of the stateless Kurds, acting as editore, but providing just a few of her own photographs (Kurdistan: In the Shadow of History, 1997).

John Ranard created portfolios of black communities' store-front churches in Louisville, Kentucky (On Every Corner), another, The Brutal Aesthetic, on boxing (partly published in On Boxing, 1987). photographed squatters and the homeless in New York City, and spent lengthy periods in Russia during perestroika, gained access to the grim prisons there (Forty Pounds of Salt, 1995), and saw the poignant problem of HIV/AIDS, with Full Life and The Fire Within published in 2001 by Médecins Sans Frontières and the AIDS Foundation East-West.

A prominent contemporary social documentary photographer is Brazilian Sebastião Salgado, who has documented the migrant workers in mines and other hazardous, polluted environments previously unseen by consumers in the industrialized west (Workers: An Archaeology of the Industrial Age, 1993, Migrations and The Children: Refugees and Migrant, both 2000). The artistic virtuosity of his high-contrast black-and-white images has drawn criticism for potentially reducing heartbreaking human circumstances to aesthetic spectacles – a critique similarly leveled against Eugene Smith.

The documentary photography of Martin Parr contrasts starkly with that of Salgado. His critical view of the rapidly evolving consumerism in the 1980s, the tourism spreading worldwide and the consequences of globalisation in the 1990s find their equivalent in screaming oversaturated images of the absurdities and shortcomings of the individual in industrialised societies. He is ironic and sympathetic at the same time, so identification with his subjects is possible and is able to transmit the message.

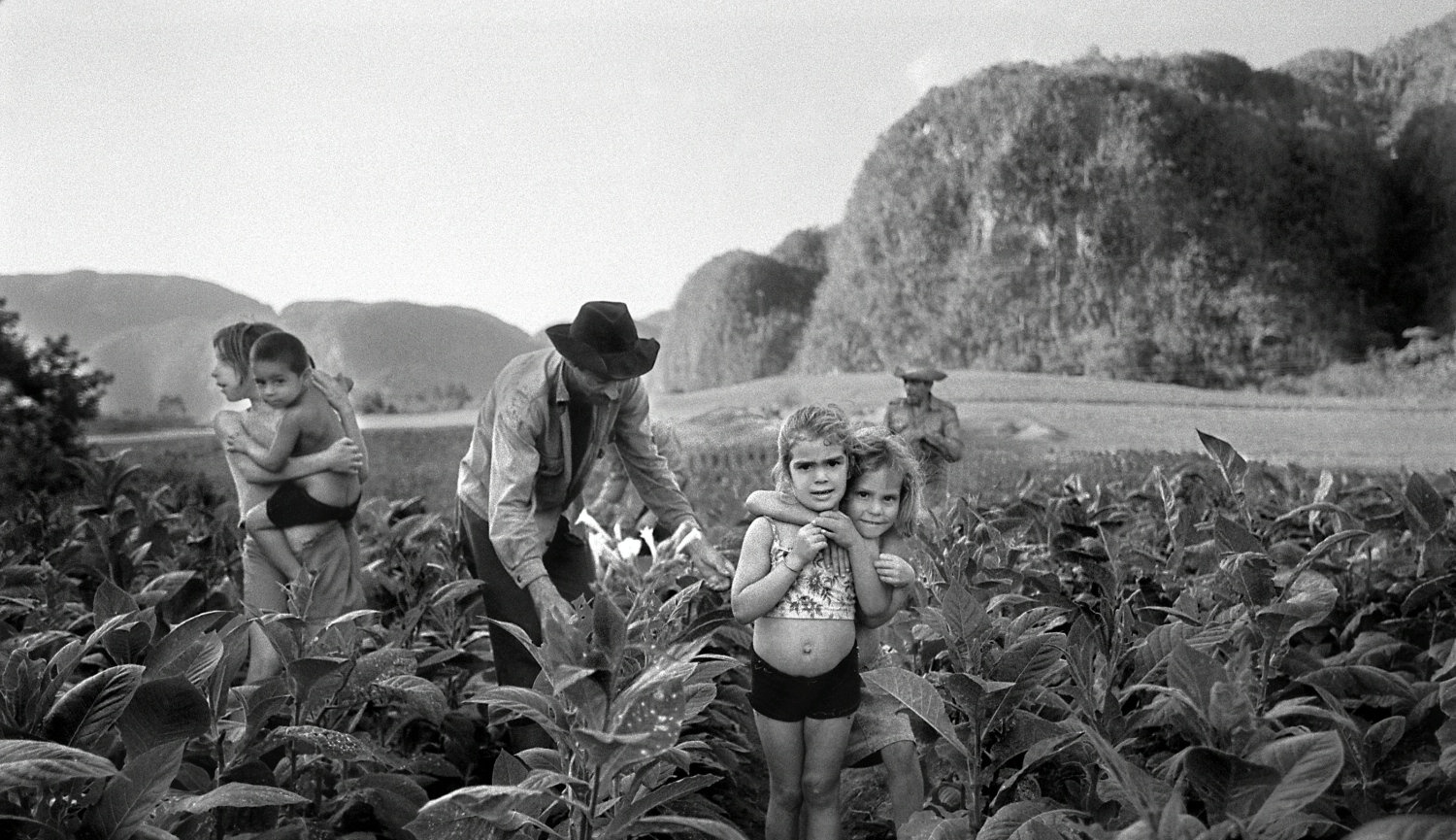
Manuel Rivera-Ortiz, Tobacco Harvesting, Valle de Viñales, Cuba 2002

The aims of social documentation continue today in Puerto Rican photographer Manuel Rivera-Ortiz's photographs of lives in poverty. Affected by his own experience of growing up poor in rural Puerto Rico, Rivera-Ortiz refers to his work as a celebration of life, in poverty.

In 2021, the BBC News profiled the Ghanaian documentary photographer Muntaka Chasant in a short film, highlighting his work documenting hazardous child labor and environmental conditions at the Agbogbloshie e-waste site in Accra, Ghana. His work helped reunite a runaway teenager and underscored the human and ecological costs of informal e-waste recycling, demonstrating the collaboration between documentary photographers and mainstream media in examining environmental and socio-economic issues.

== Engaged photography as marketable art ==
Since the late 1970s, social documentary photography has increasingly been accorded a place in photo galleries alongside fine art photography, conceptual photography and the increasing use of the medium by artists as a central medium or in mixed medium works, documenting performances, fleeting alterations of landscape etcetera. Luc Delahaye, the aforementioned Rivera-Ortiz and Ranard, and the members of VII Photo Agency are among many who have regularly exhibited in galleries and museums.

== Border areas and related genres ==
Some photographers address social issues without dedicated advocacy for the victims of social inequality and grievance, such as Diane Arbus or Tina Barney. While Arbus created haunting images of deviant and marginal people (dwarfs, giants, transgender people, nudists, circus performers) or of people whose normality seems ugly or surreal, Barney documented the life of the white upper class in New England. Social documentary in the literal sense are multifaceted documentations from workaday life in certain cities, landscapes and cultures. The examples are equally varied as the opportunities. Roman Vishniac may be mentioned as a characteristic representative, who documented Jewish life in Eastern Europe prior to the Holocaust (Verschwundene Welt, A Vanished World)|. Another genre close to the procedures and results of social documentary photography can be found in the ethnographic photography that often documents people in precarious situations, however intending to document disappearing traditions, clothing or living conditions.

Social Realism is an artistic movement, expressed in the visual and other realist arts, which depicts working class activities as heroic. Many artists who subscribed to Social Realism were painters with socialist political views. The movement therefore has some commonalities with the Socialist Realism used in certain Communist nations.
