= Headingley (disambiguation) =

Headingley is a suburb of Leeds, West Yorkshire, England.

Headingley may also refer to:

== Topics associated with Headingley, Leeds ==
- Headingley railway station

=== Governance ===
- Leeds Central and Headingley, UK parliamentary constituency created in 2024
- Headingley and Hyde Park (ward), ward of Leeds City Council created in 2018

=== Sports ===
- Headingley Cricket Ground
- Headingley Rugby Stadium
- Headingley Stadium, complex including the cricket ground and rugby stadium
- Headingley FC or Headingley RUFC, predecessor from 1878 to 1992 of Leeds Tykes rugby union club

== Other places ==
- Rural Municipality of Headingley, Manitoba, Canada

- Headingley Correctional Institution, a prison in Manitoba, Canada

== People ==
- Adolphe Smith Headingley (1846-1925), British political writer

== See also ==
- Headingly Station, a cattle station in Queensland, Australia
- Far Headingley, an area of Leeds north of Headingley
