= Street Life in London =

1877 book by Adolphe Smith and John Thomson

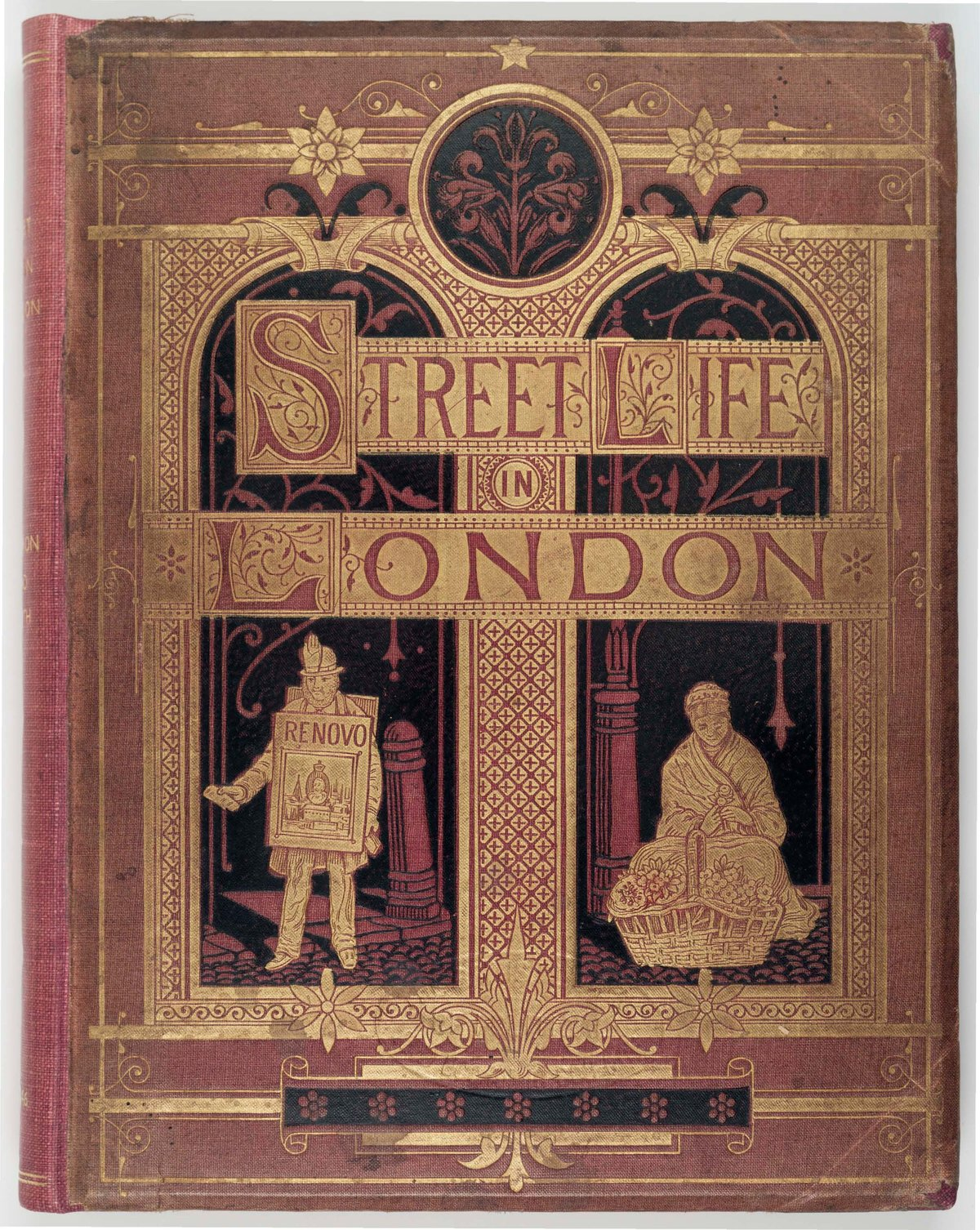
- Authors: Adolphe Smith (words) and John Thomson (photos)
- Language: English
- Subject: Working class Londoners
- Genre: Non-fiction
- Published in: London
- Publisher: Sampson Low
- Publication date: 1877

Street Life in London was a 1877 book written by Adolphe Smith with photography by John Thomson.

The book is one of the first examples of social documentary photography.

== Production ==
Street Life in London was a 1877 publication of a collaboration between the radical social journalist Adolphe Smith and Scottish photographer John Thomson. It was published by Sampson Low, Marston, Searle and Rivington, in London.

The authors believed they were continuing the important work of Henry Mayhew, who published London Labour and the London Poor, but that they were adding a unique value by incorporating photography to the ongoing documentation of London's working class poor.

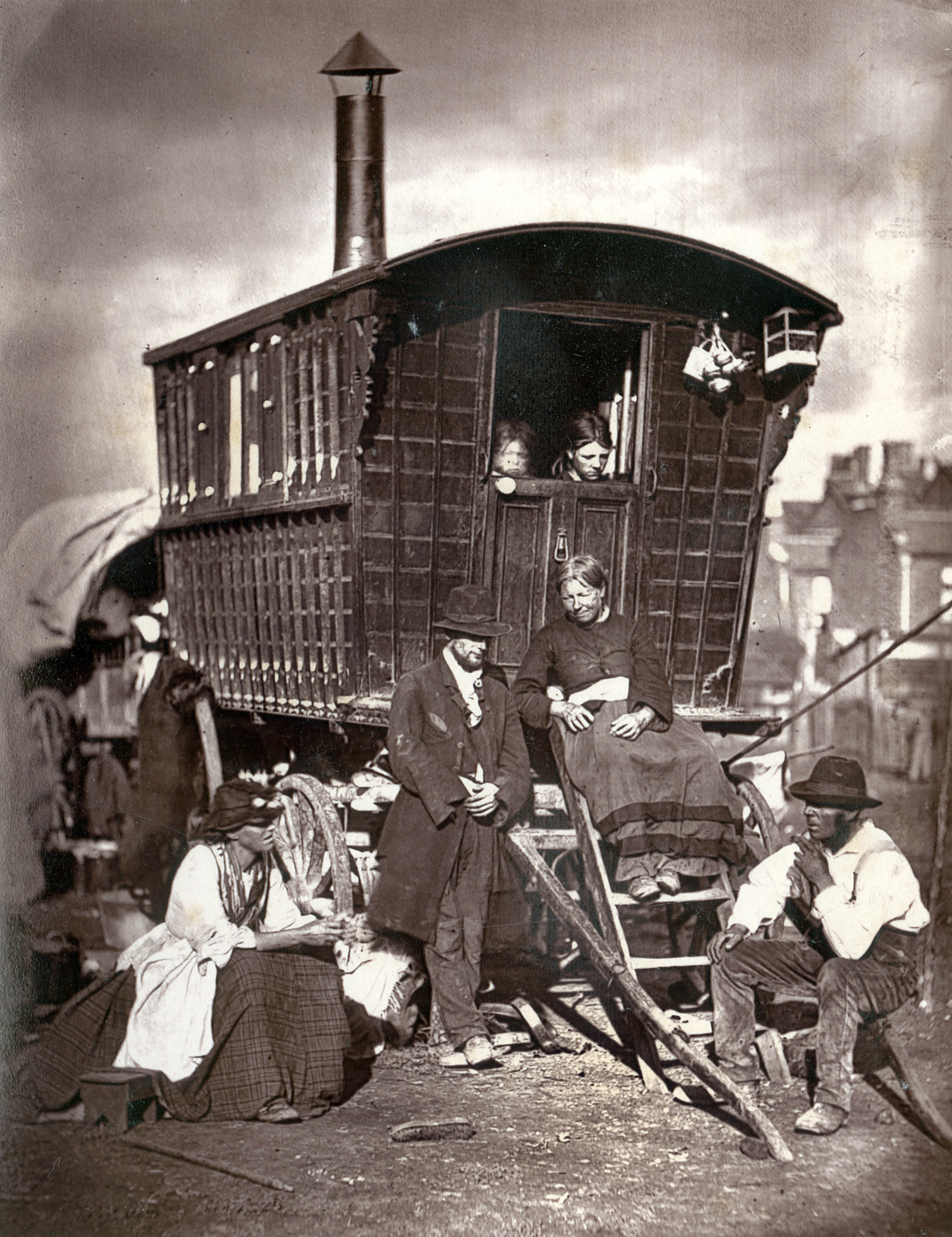
"London Nomades", a photo from the book that includes Mary Pradd

== Synopsis ==
The book gives the reader an insight into the daily lives of working class and poor Londoners. It is arranged around photographs by Thomson with accompanying text by Smith. The texts are brief, but include detail, including information from interviewing the photograph's subjects. Subjects include flower-sellers, chimney-sweeps, shoe-blacks, chair-caners, musicians, dustmen and locksmiths.

== Reception ==
Street Life in London is considered the first or at least one of the earliest examples of social documentary photography. The book described its aim "to bring before the public some account of the present condition of the London street folk, and to supply a series of faithful pictures of the people themselves."

Author Emily Kathryn Morgan published an in-depth study on Street Life in London in 2014 which addresses both the successes and failures of the original book.
