= Mary Pradd =

English 1876 murder victim

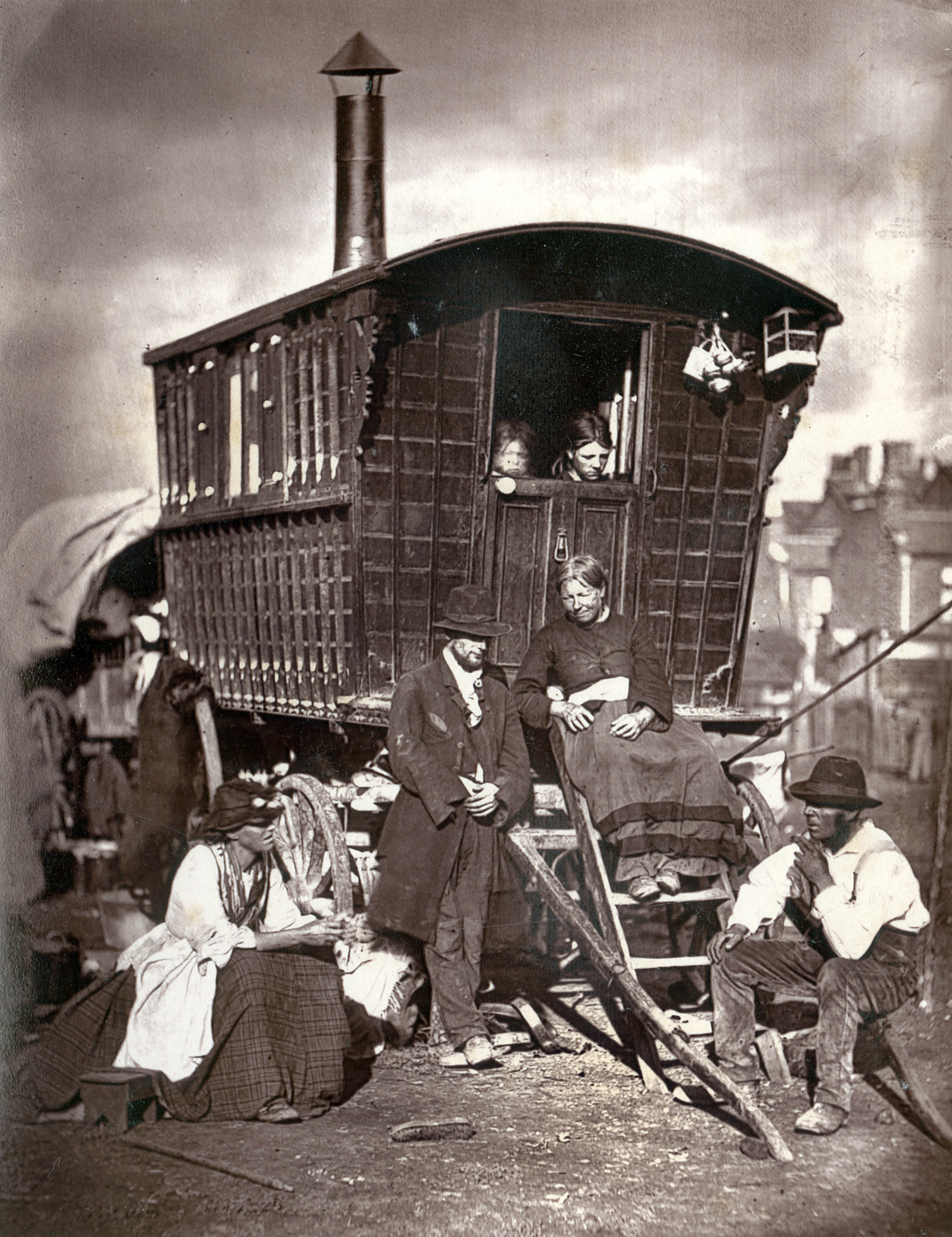
London Nomades, by John Thomson, in Victorian London Street Life (1877). Pradd is sitting on the steps of the caravan.

Mary Pradd (died November 1876) often known as Old Mary Pradd, sometimes Mary Pratt, was an English woman murdered in The Borough, London in 1876.

Pradd was photographed by John Thomson a few weeks before her death and appeared in his 1877 book Street Life in London.

== Adult life ==
Pradd was married to a tinker called Lamb and she travelled around with Lamb and along with other men, including Mr Gumble, Edward Roland. Lamb and Pradd had a daughter named Harriet Lamb.

Pradd was socialising with friends in Battersea when she was photographed by John Thomson in Kent Street, London, a few weeks before her death. The photograph appeared in his 1877 book Street Life in London.

She was known to over-consume alcohol.

== Death ==
Pradd died in November 15 or 16 1876 at the age of 55 years of a haemorrhage from a stab wound that occurred while sharing a room with her friends Gumble and Roland who were fully dressed and asleep at the time of her death. Roland and Gumble were initially suspected of being involved in her death, but a jury found insufficient evidence to find them guilty of any crime. Pradd was found dead on the room's floor, fully dressed, with a three-quarter-inch long laceration to her body.
