= John Thomson (photographer) =

Scottish photographer (1837–1921)

John Thomson FRGS
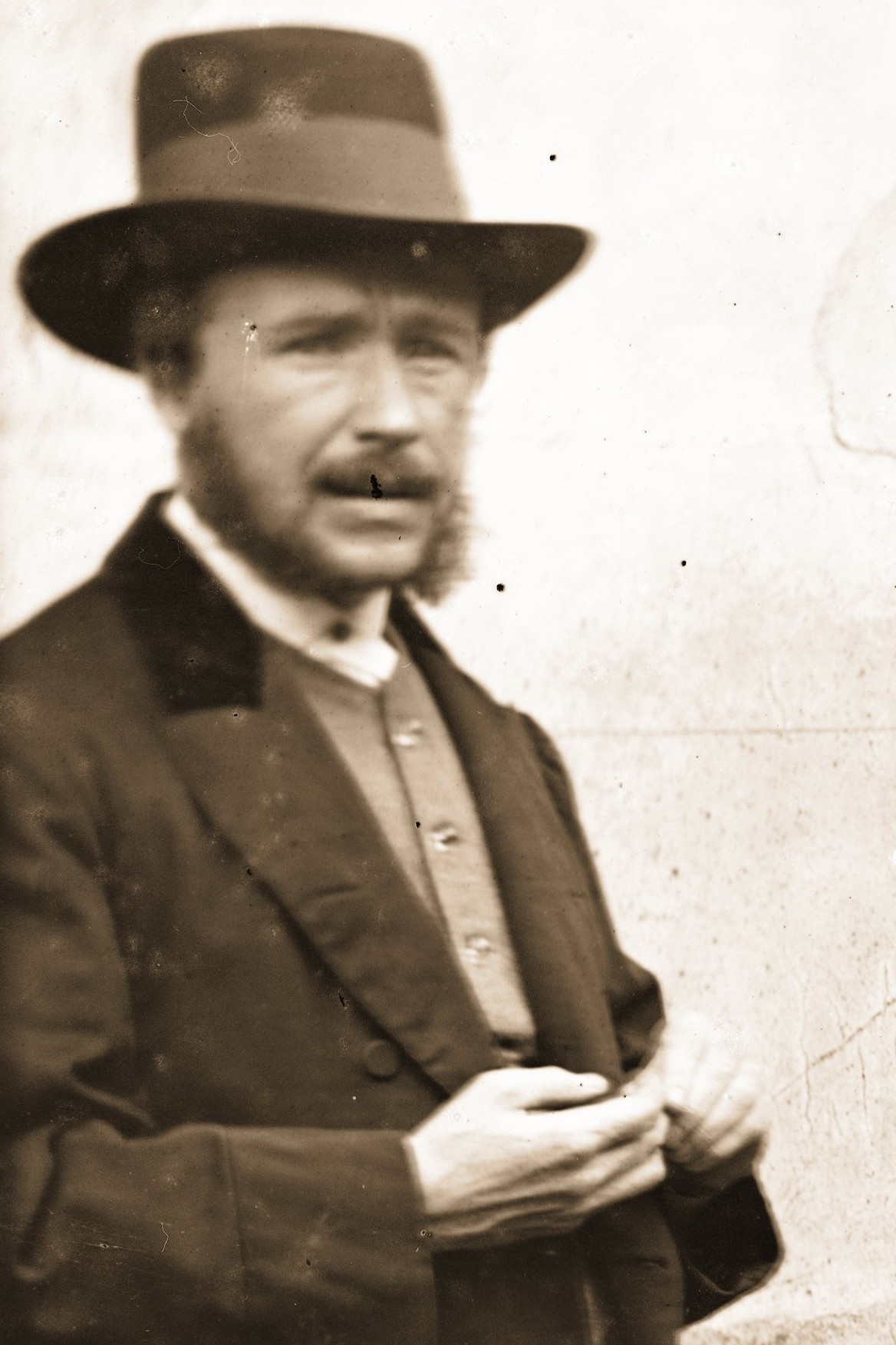
- Self-portrait, 1871
- Born: 14 June 1837; Edinburgh, Scotland
- Died: 29 September 1921 (aged 84); Edinburgh, Scotland
- Education: Heriot-Watt University
- Occupations: Photographer, geographer, traveller
- Organization(s): Royal Ethnological Society of London; Royal Geographical Society
- Notable work: Foochow and the River Min

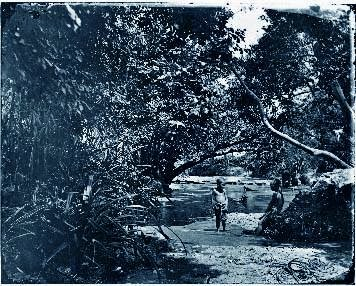
Children Playing in a Stream, Singapore, c. 1864

John Thomson FRGS (14 June 1837 – 29 September 1921) was a pioneering Scottish photographer, geographer, and traveller. He was one of the first photographers to travel to the Far East, documenting the people, landscapes and artefacts of eastern cultures. Upon returning home, his work among the street people of London cemented his reputation, and is regarded as a classic instance of social documentary which laid the foundations for photojournalism. He went on to become a portrait photographer of high society in Mayfair, gaining the royal warrant in 1881.

== Early life ==
The son of William Thomson, a tobacco spinner and retail trader, and his wife Isabella Newlands, Thomson was born the eighth of nine children in Edinburgh in the year of Queen Victoria's accession. From 1841, the family lived at 6 Brighton Street in Edinburgh's South Side (now marked by a plaque).

After his schooling in the early 1850s, he was apprenticed to a local optical and scientific instrument manufacturer, thought to be James Mackay Bryson. During this time, Thomson learned the principles of photography and completed his apprenticeship around 1858.

During this time he also undertook two years of evening classes at the Watt Institution and School of Arts (formerly the Edinburgh School of Arts, later to become Heriot-Watt University). He received the "Attestation of Proficiency" in natural philosophy in 1857, and in junior mathematics and chemistry in 1858. In 1861, he became a member of the Royal Scottish Society of Arts, but by 1862 he had decided to travel to Singapore to join his older brother William, a watchmaker and photographer.

== Early travels ==
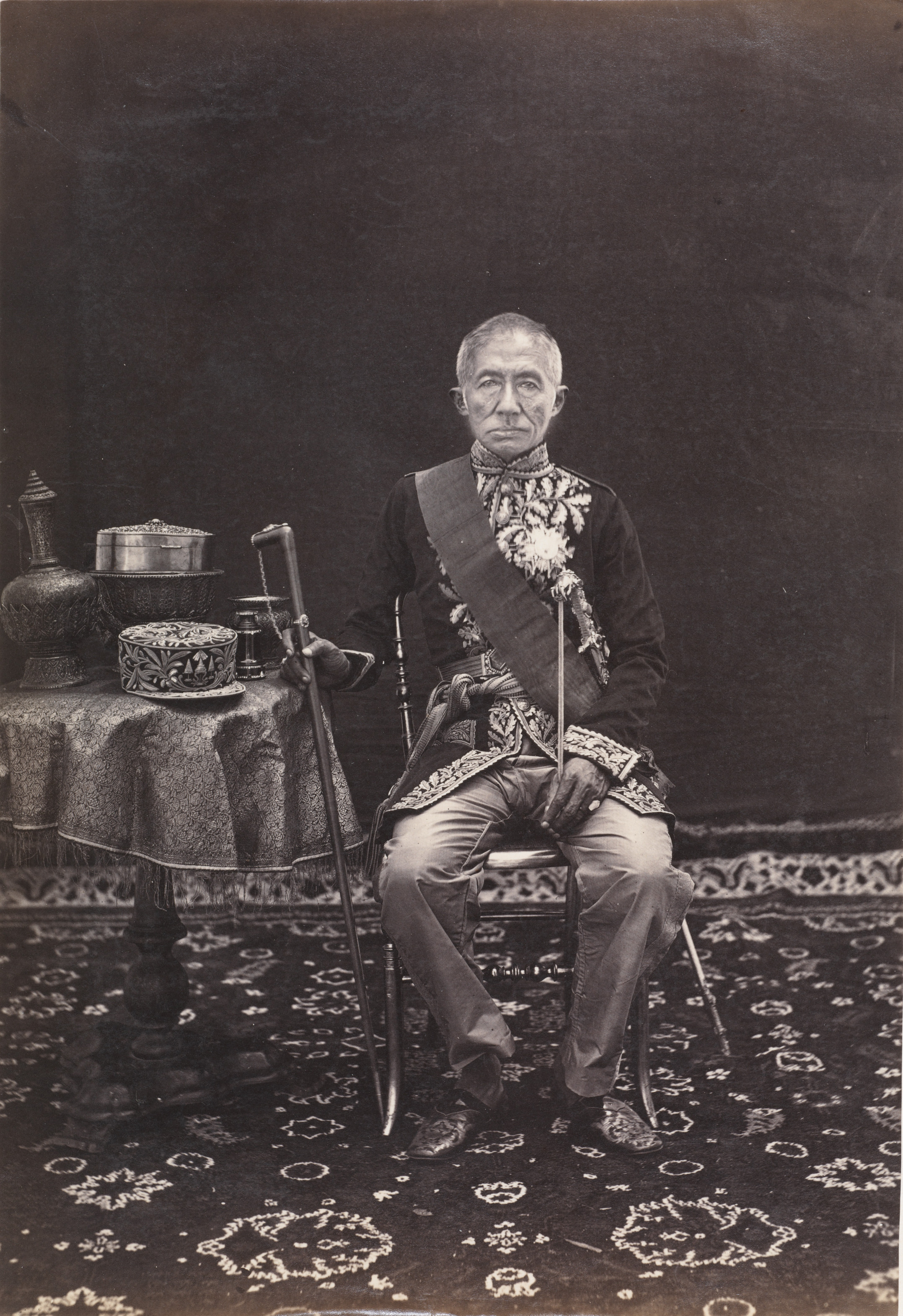
King Mongkut of Siam, Bangkok (European Dress), 1865–1866

In April 1862, Thomson left Edinburgh for Singapore, beginning a ten-year period spent travelling around the Far East. Initially, he established a joint business with William to manufacture marine chronometers and optical and nautical instruments. He also established a photographic studio in Singapore, taking portraits of European merchants, and he developed an interest in local peoples and places. He travelled extensively throughout the mainland territories of Malaya and the island of Sumatra, exploring the villages and photographing the native peoples and their activities.

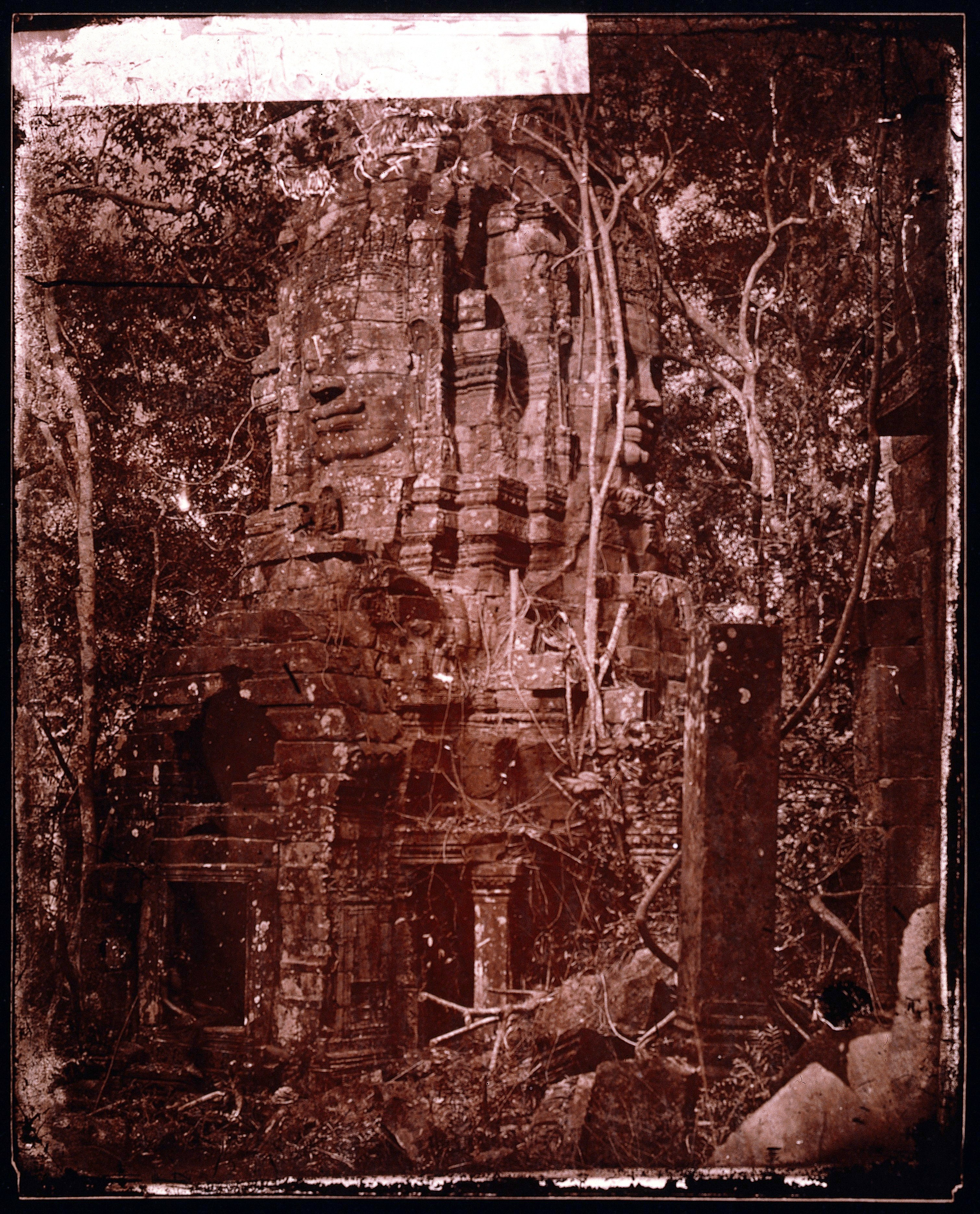
Prea Sat Ling Poun, Angkor Wat, 1865

After visiting Ceylon and India from October to November 1864 to document the destruction caused by a recent cyclone, Thomson sold his Singapore studio and moved to Siam. After arrival in Bangkok in September 1865, Thomson undertook a series of photographs of the King of Siam and other senior members of the royal court and government.

Inspired by Henri Mouhot's account of the rediscovery of the ancient cities of Angkor in the Cambodian jungle, Thomson embarked on what would become the first of his major photographic expeditions. He set off in January 1866 with his translator H. G. Kennedy, a British Consular official in Bangkok, who saved Thomson's life when he contracted jungle fever en route. The pair spent two weeks at Angkor, where Thomson extensively documented the vast site, producing some of the earliest photographs of what is today a UNESCO World Heritage Site.

Thomson then moved on to Phnom Penh and took photographs of the King of Cambodia and other members of the Cambodian royal family, before travelling on to Saigon. From there he stayed in Bangkok briefly, before returning to Britain in May or June in 1866. While back home, Thomson lectured extensively to the British Association and published his photographs of Siam and Cambodia. He became a member of the Royal Ethnological Society of London and was elected a Fellow of the Royal Geographical Society in 1866, and published his first book, The Antiquities of Cambodia, in early 1867.

== Travels in China ==
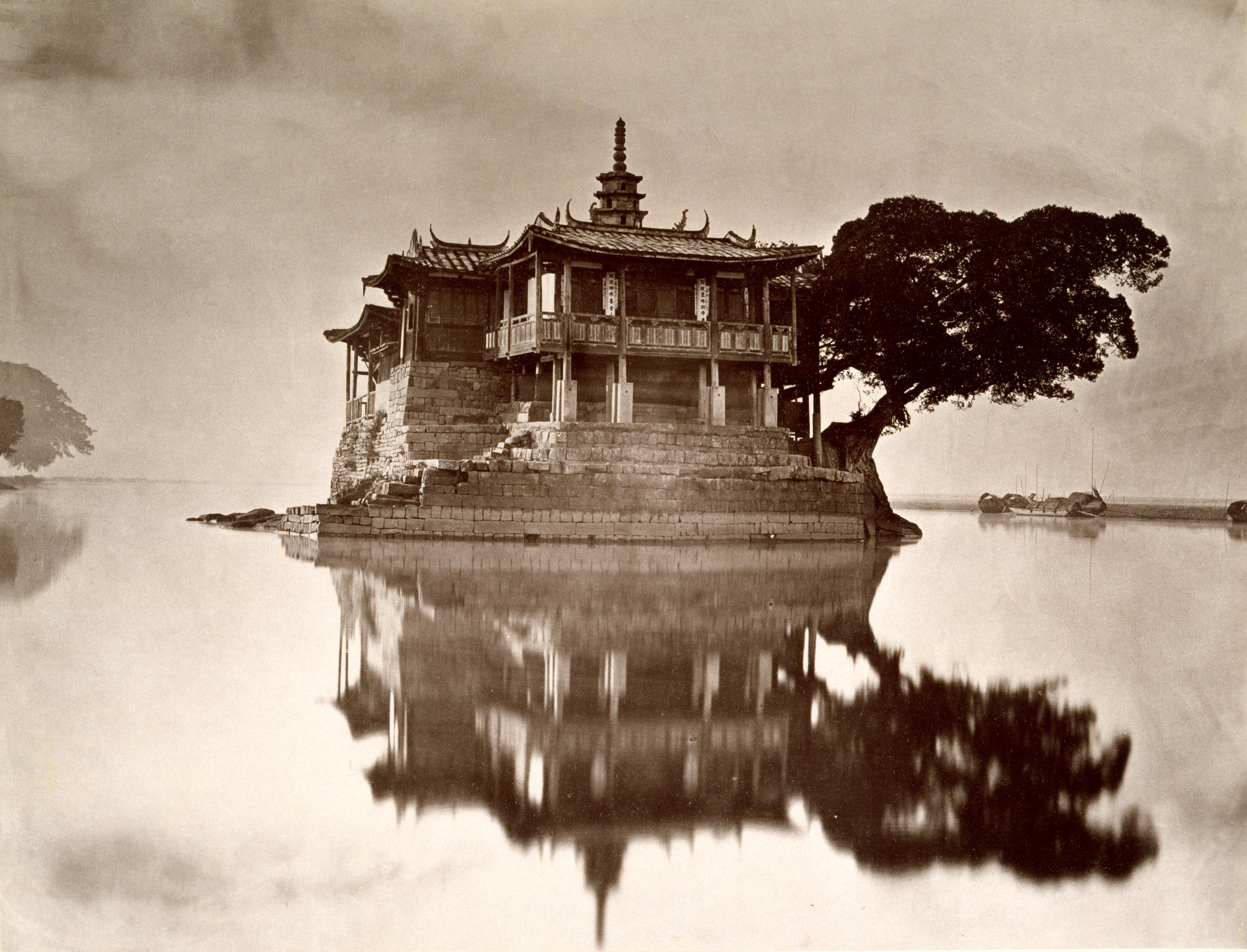
Island Pagoda, about 1871, from the album, Foochow and the River Min

After a year in Britain, Thomson again felt the desire to return to the Far East. He returned to Singapore in July 1867, before moving to Saigon for three months and finally settling in Hong Kong in 1868. He established a studio in the Commercial Bank building, and spent the next four years photographing the people of China and recording the diversity of Chinese culture.

Thomson traveled extensively throughout China, from the southern trading ports of Hong Kong and Guangzhou (Canton) to the cities of Beijing and Shanghai, to the Great Wall in the north, and deep into central China. From 1870 to 1871, he visited the province of Fujian, travelling up the Min River by boat with the American Protestant missionary Reverend Justus Doolittle, and then visited Amoy and Shantou.

He went on to visit the island of Taiwan with the missionary Dr. James Laidlaw Maxwell, landing first in Takau in early April 1871. The pair visited the capital, Taiwanfu (now Tainan), before travelling on to the aboriginal villages on the west plains of the island. After leaving Formosa, Thomson spent the next three months travelling 3,000 miles up the Yangtze River, reaching Hubei and Sichuan.

Thomson's travels in China were often perilous, as he visited remote, almost unpopulated regions far inland. Most of the people he encountered had never seen a Westerner or camera before. His expeditions were also especially challenging because he had to transport his bulky wooden camera, many large, fragile glass plates, and potentially explosive chemicals. He photographed in a wide variety of conditions and often had to improvise because chemicals were difficult to acquire. His subject matter varied enormously: from humble beggars and street people to Mandarins, Princes and senior government officials; from remote monasteries to Imperial Palaces; from simple rural villages to magnificent landscapes.

== Later life ==
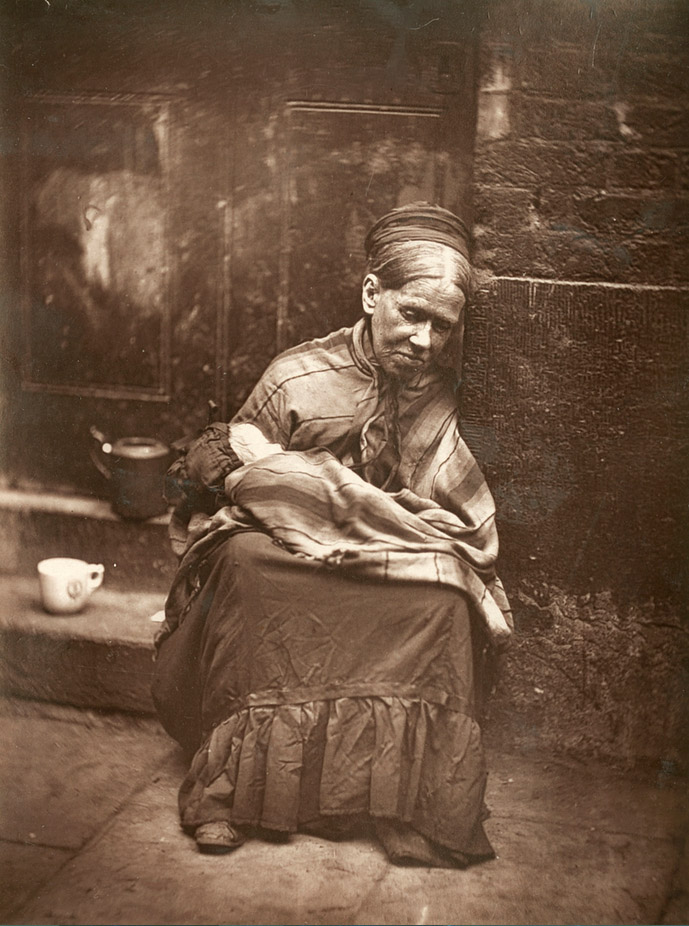
The Crawlers, London, 1876–1877

Thomson returned to England in 1872, settling in Brixton, London, and, apart from a final photographic journey to Cyprus in 1878, Thomson never left again. Over the coming years he proceeded to lecture and publish, presenting the results of his travels in the Far East. His publications started initially in monthly magazines, followed by a series of large, lavishly illustrated photographic books. He wrote extensively on photography, contributing many articles to photographic journals such as the British Journal of Photography. He also translated and edited Gaston Tissandier's 1876 History and Handbook of Photography, which became a standard reference work.

In London, Thomson renewed his acquaintance with Adolphe Smith, a radical journalist whom he had met at the Royal Geographical Society in 1866. Together they collaborated in producing the monthly magazine, Street Life in London, from 1876 to 1877. The project documented in photographs and text the lives of the street people of London, establishing social documentary photography as an early type of photojournalism. The series of photographs was later published in book form in 1878.

He was elected a member of the Photographic Society, later the Royal Photographic Society, on 11 November 1879. With his reputation as an important photographer well established, Thomson opened a portrait studio in Buckingham Palace Road in 1879, later moving it to Mayfair. In 1881 he was appointed photographer to the British royal family by Queen Victoria, and his later work concentrated on studio portraiture of the rich and famous of "high society", giving him a comfortable living. From January 1886, he began instructing explorers at the Royal Geographical Society in the use of photography to document their travels.

After retiring from his commercial studio in 1910, Thomson spent most of his time back in Edinburgh, although he continued to write papers for the Royal Geographical Society on the uses of photography. He died of a heart attack in 1921 at the age of 84.

== Legacy and commemoration ==
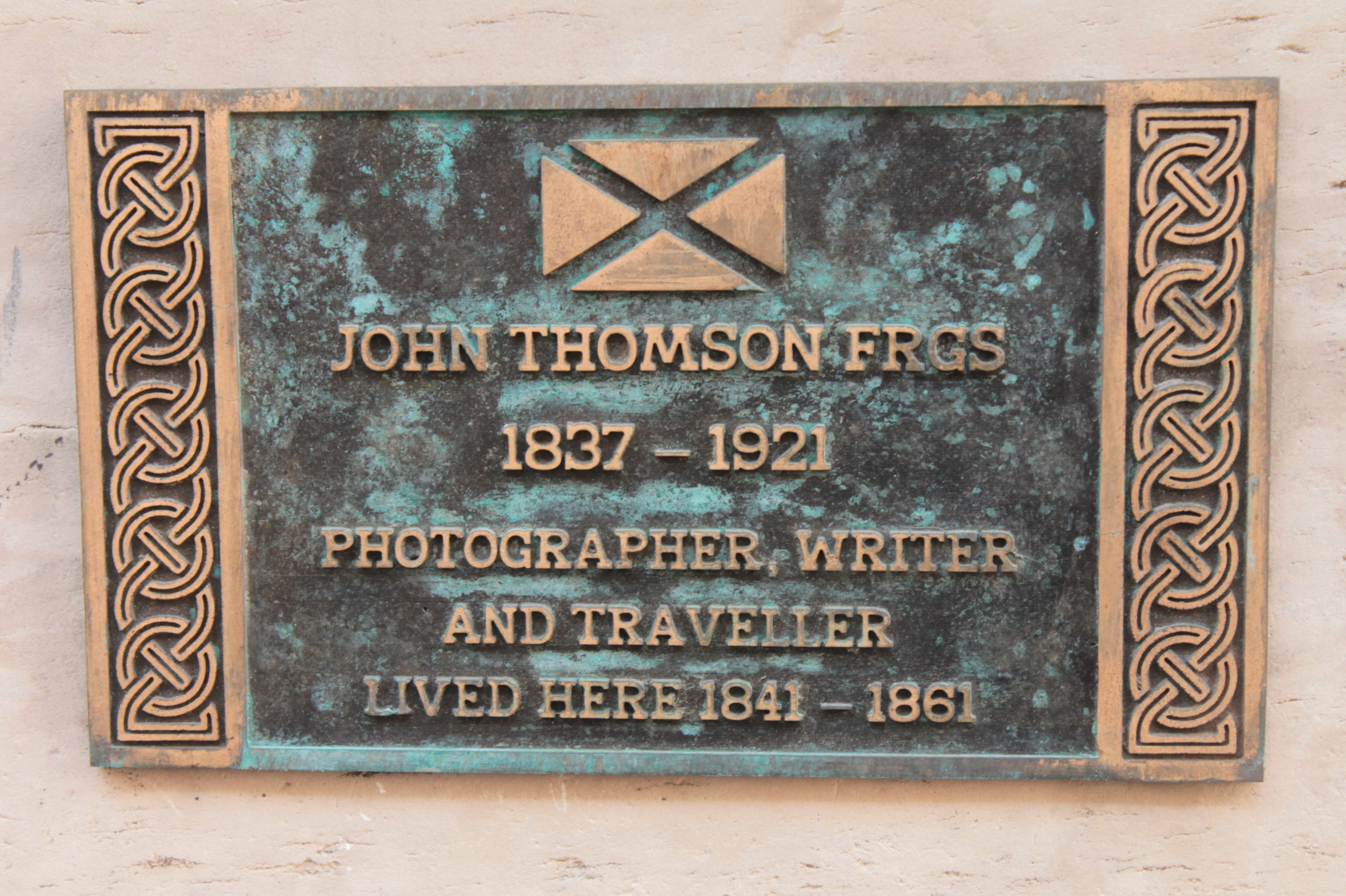
Plaque to John Thomson, Brighton Street, Edinburgh

Thomson was an accomplished photographer in many areas, including landscapes, portraiture, street photography, and architectural photography, and his legacy is a quality and breadth of coverage. His photography from the Far East enlightened the Victorian audience of Britain about the land, people, and cultures of China and South-East Asia. His work documenting the social conditions of London's street people established him as a pioneer of photojournalism, and his publishing activities mark him out as an innovator in combining photography with the printed word.

In recognition of his work, one of the peaks of Mount Kenya was named "Point Thomson" on his death in 1921. That same year, Henry Wellcome acquired a collection of glass negatives, totalling over 600, that were owned by Thomson. Today they are in the collection of the Wellcome Library. Some of Thomson's work may be seen at the Royal Geographical Society's headquarters in London. Other museums with Thomson's work in their collections include the Museum of Modern Art, the Victoria and Albert Museum, the National Portrait Gallery, the University of Michigan Museum of Art, the National Science and Media Museum, and the Isabella Stewart Gardner Museum.

Through the Lens of John Thomson: China and Siam, a selection of Thomson's photographs from the Wellcome Library, London, is currently touring internationally.

In August 2024, English Heritage unveiled a blue plaque in Thomson's honour at his former home, 15 Effra Road, Brixton, London, SW2 1BX.

== Controversy ==
In 2001, Phiphat Phongraphiphon, a Thai independent researcher in historical photography, published claims that Thomson took works by Thai court photographer Khun Sunthornsathitsalak (Christian name: Francis Chit) and published them as his own. Evidence to Phiphat's claims include an analysis of a photograph in which the temple Wat Ratchapradit, which was built before Thomson arrived in Bangkok, is missing.

== Selected works ==
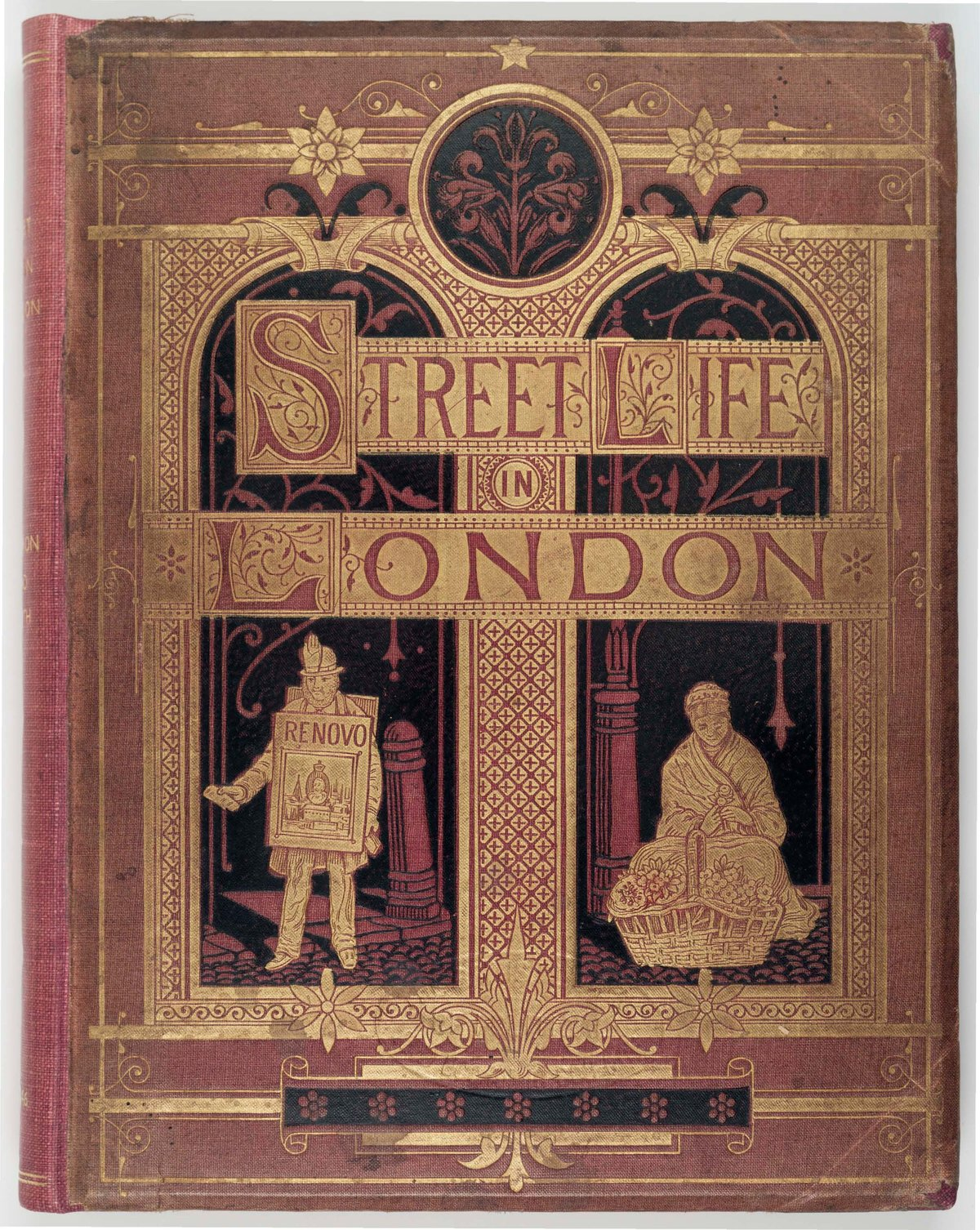
- Street Life in London, 1877
  The Antiquities of Cambodia (1867)
- Views on the North River (1870)
- Foochow and the River Min (1873)
- Illustrations of China and Its People, Four Volumes (1873–1874)
- The Straits of Malacca, Indo-China, and China (1875)
- Street Life in London (1877)
- Through Cyprus with a Camera in the Autumn of 1878 (1879)
- Through China with a Camera (1898)

== Selected photographs ==
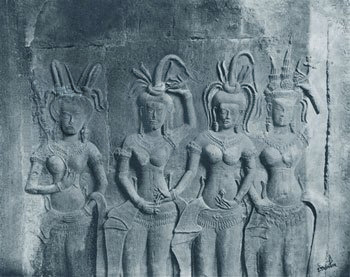
Carving from Angkor Wat Temple, 1866

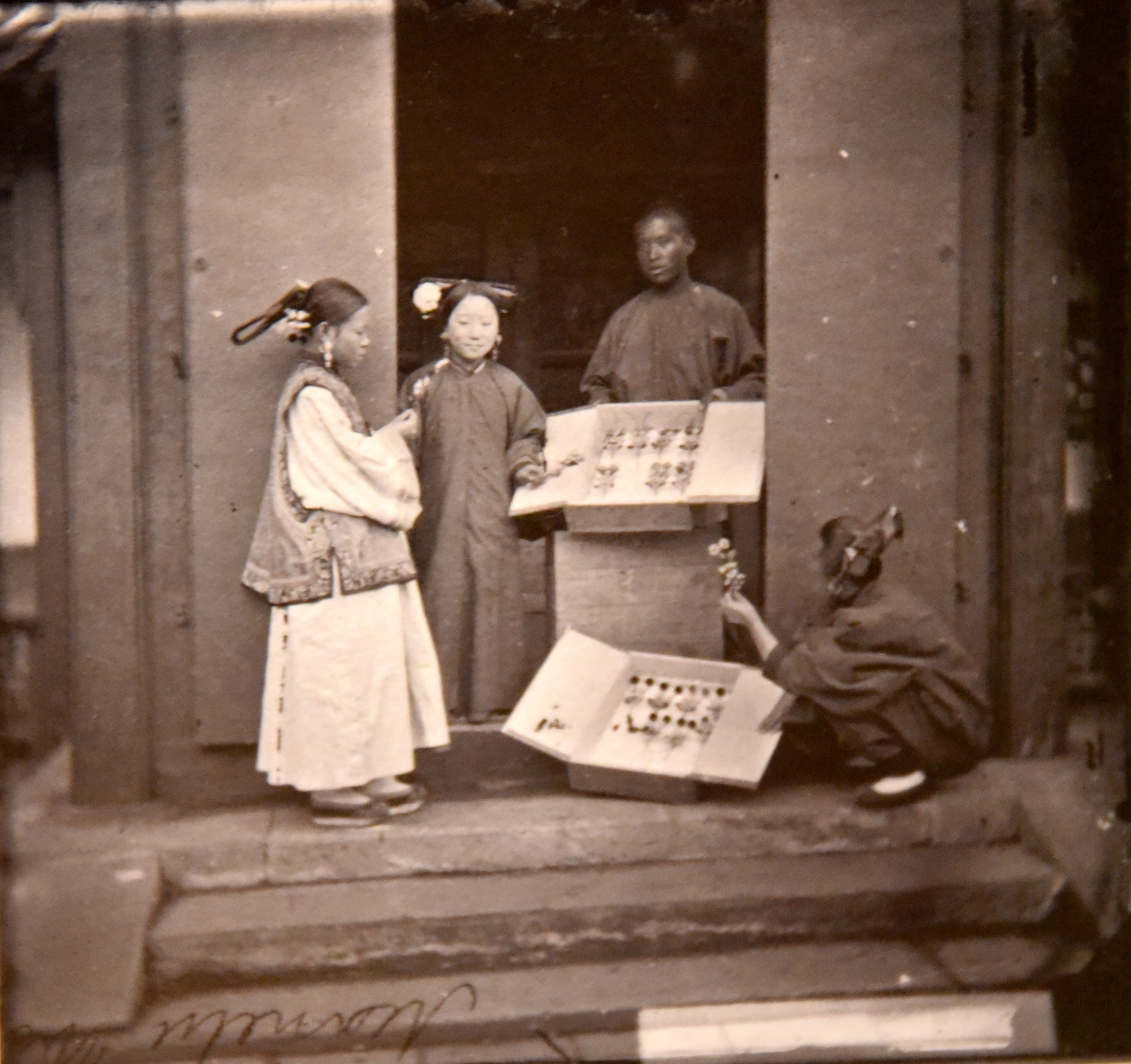
Manchu women being sold hair ornaments. John Thomson. China, 1869. The Wellcome Collection, London

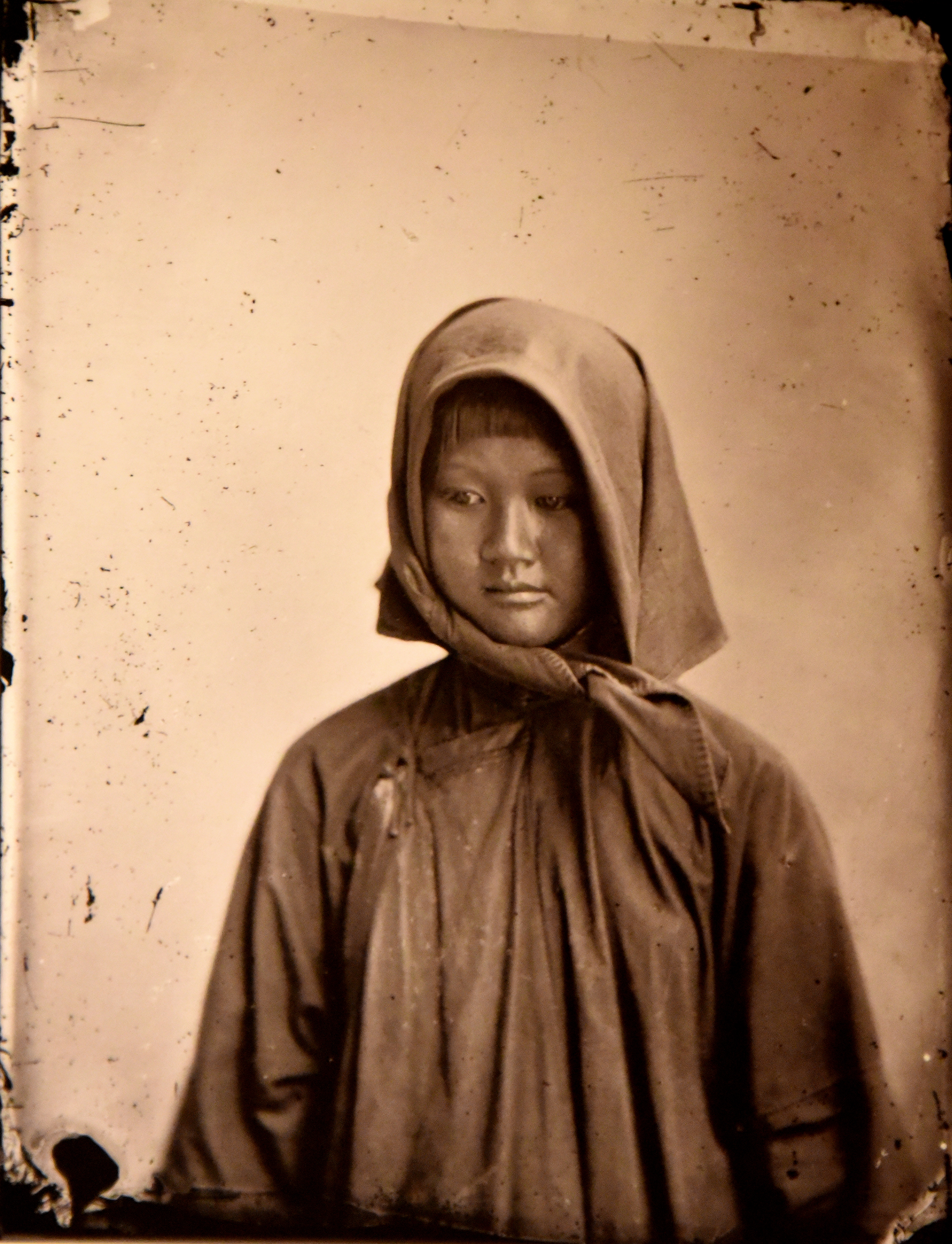
A Cantonese boat girl. John Thomson. China, 1869. The Wellcome Collection, London

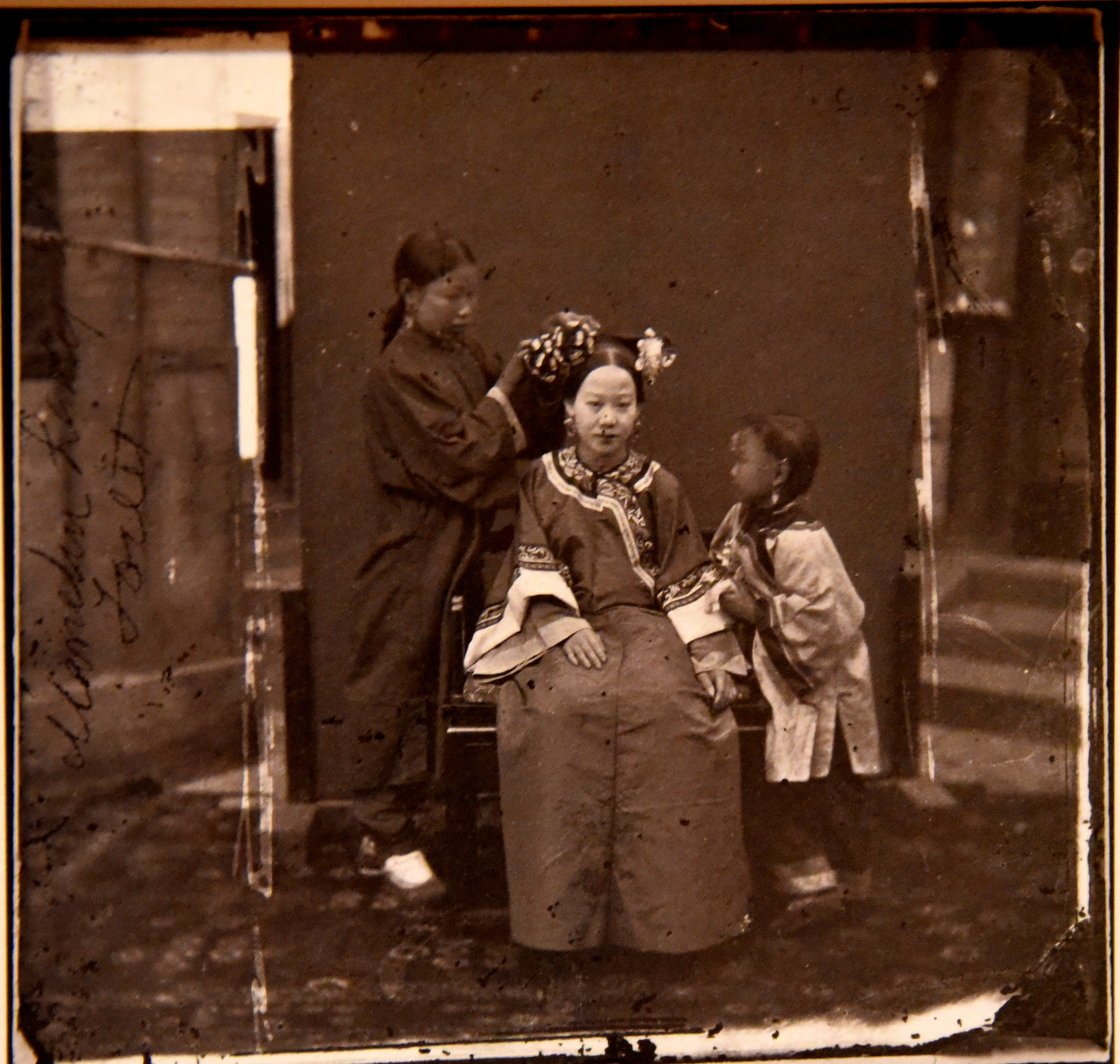
Manchu lady having her hair styled. John Thomson. China, 1869. The Wellcome Collection, London

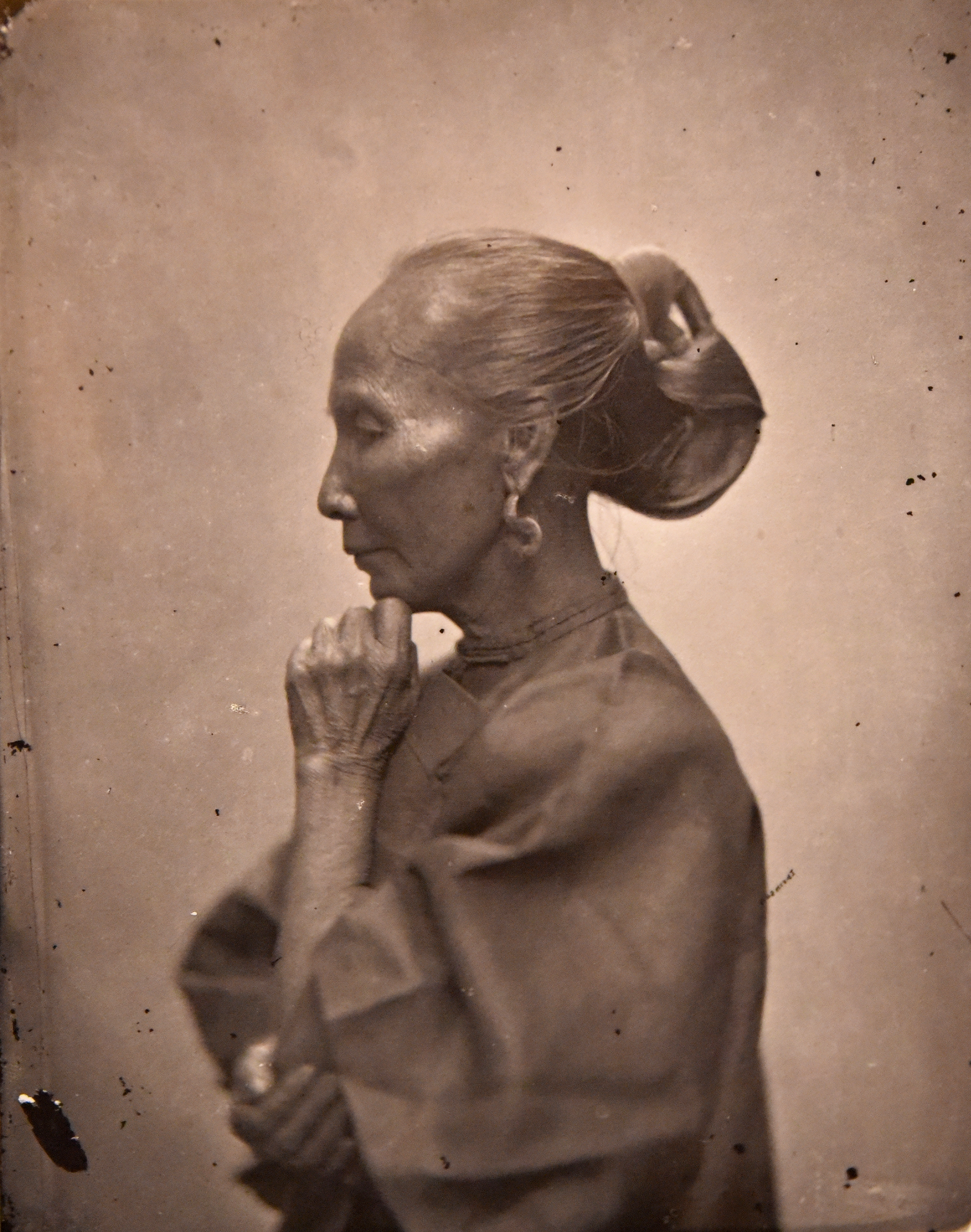
Old Chinese woman with elaborate hair style. John Thomson. China, 1869. The Wellcome Collection, London

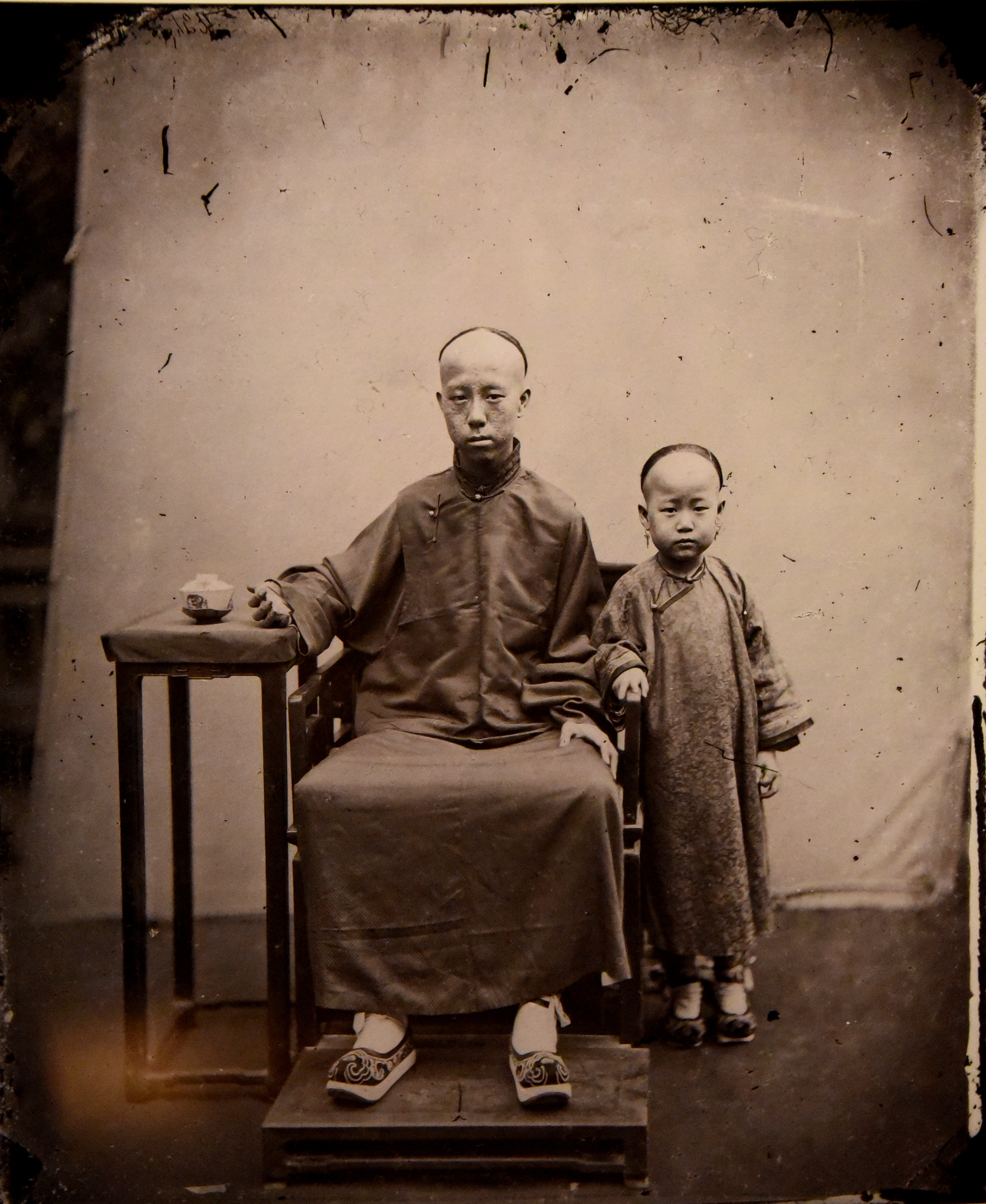
Mandarin and son. John Thomson. China, 1869. The Wellcome Collection, London

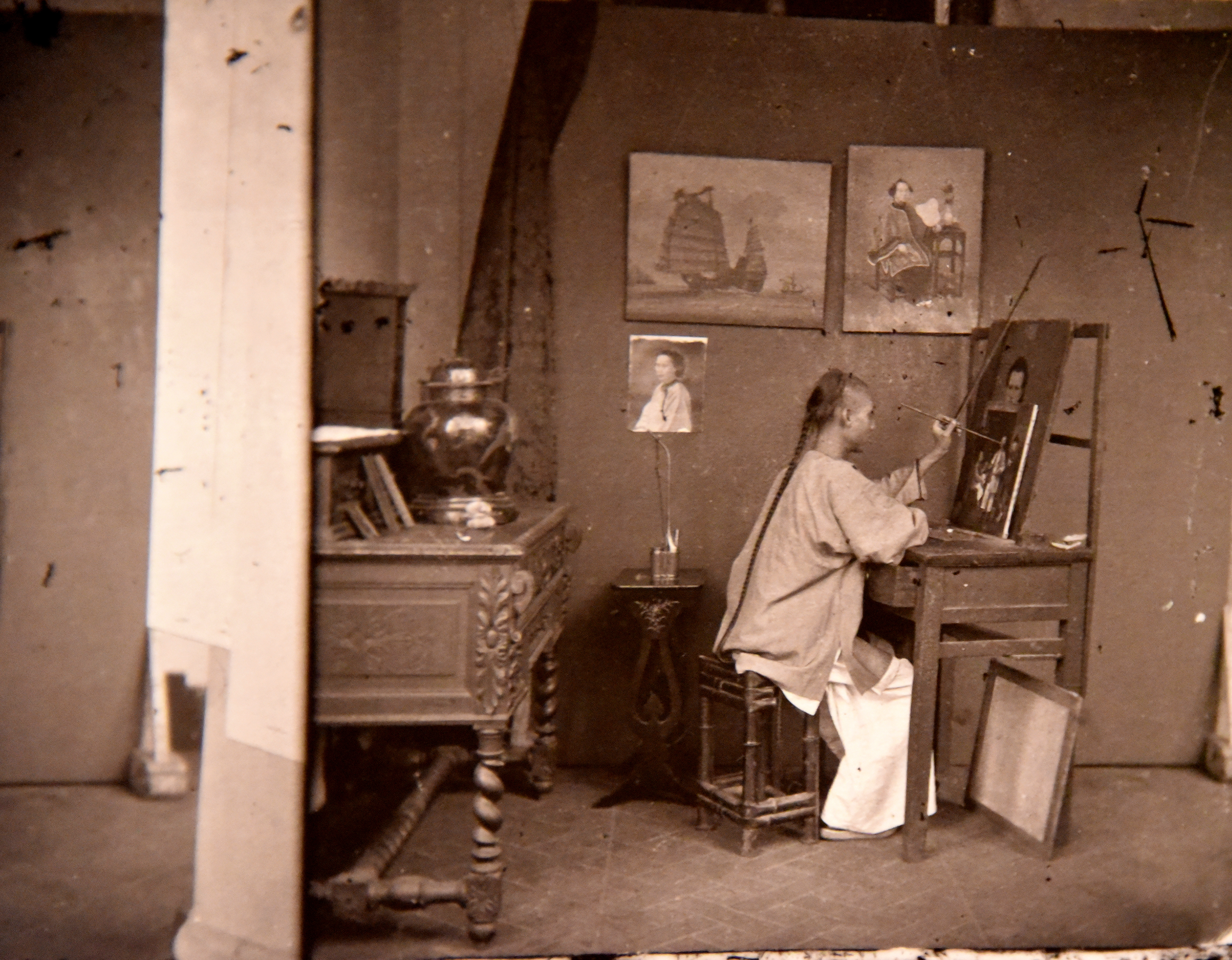
A painter at work. John Thomson. Hong Kong, 1871. The Wellcome Collection, London

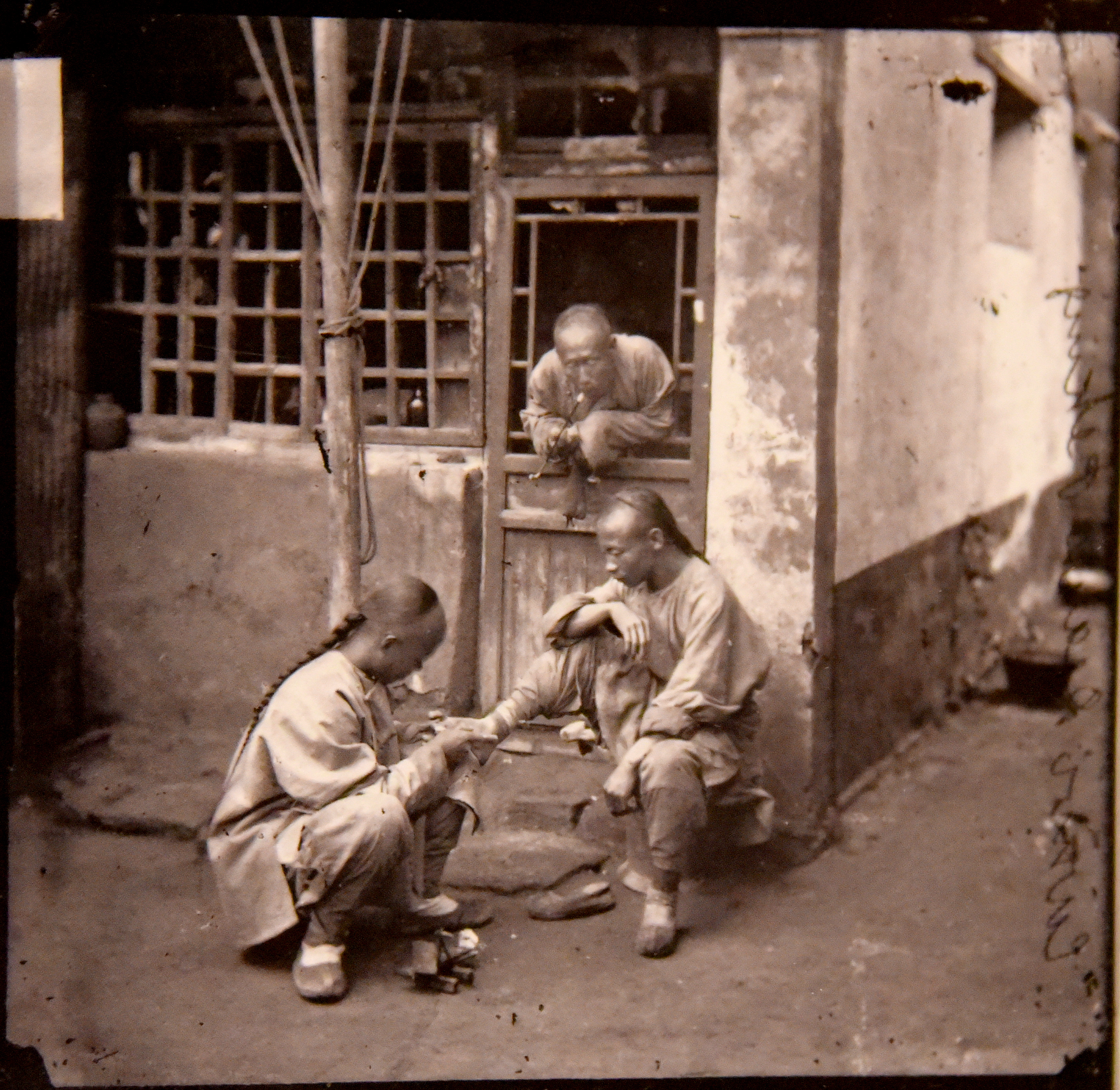
A Pekingese chiropodist. John Thomson. China, 1869. The Wellcome Collection, London

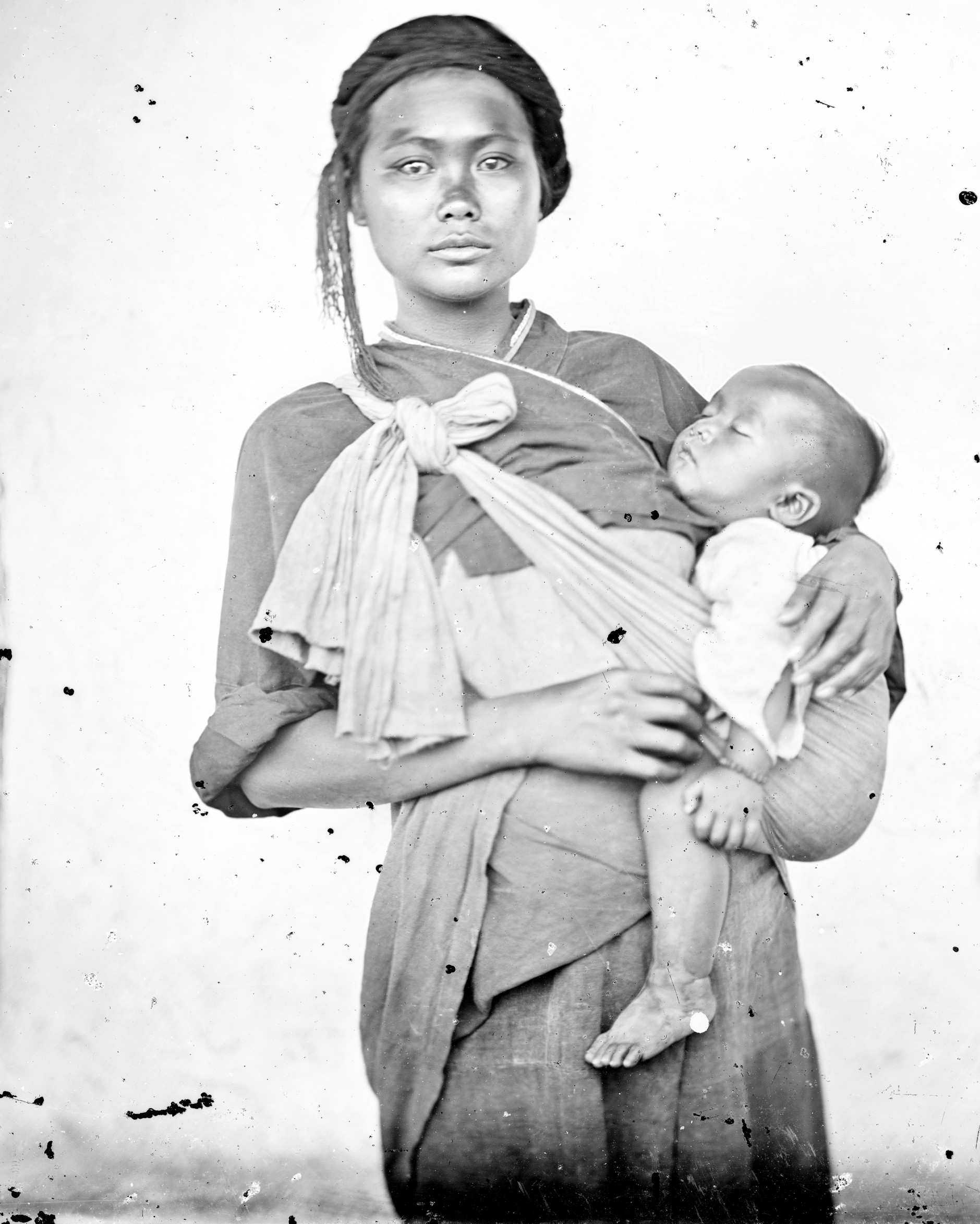
A Baksa woman and child, Formosa 1871

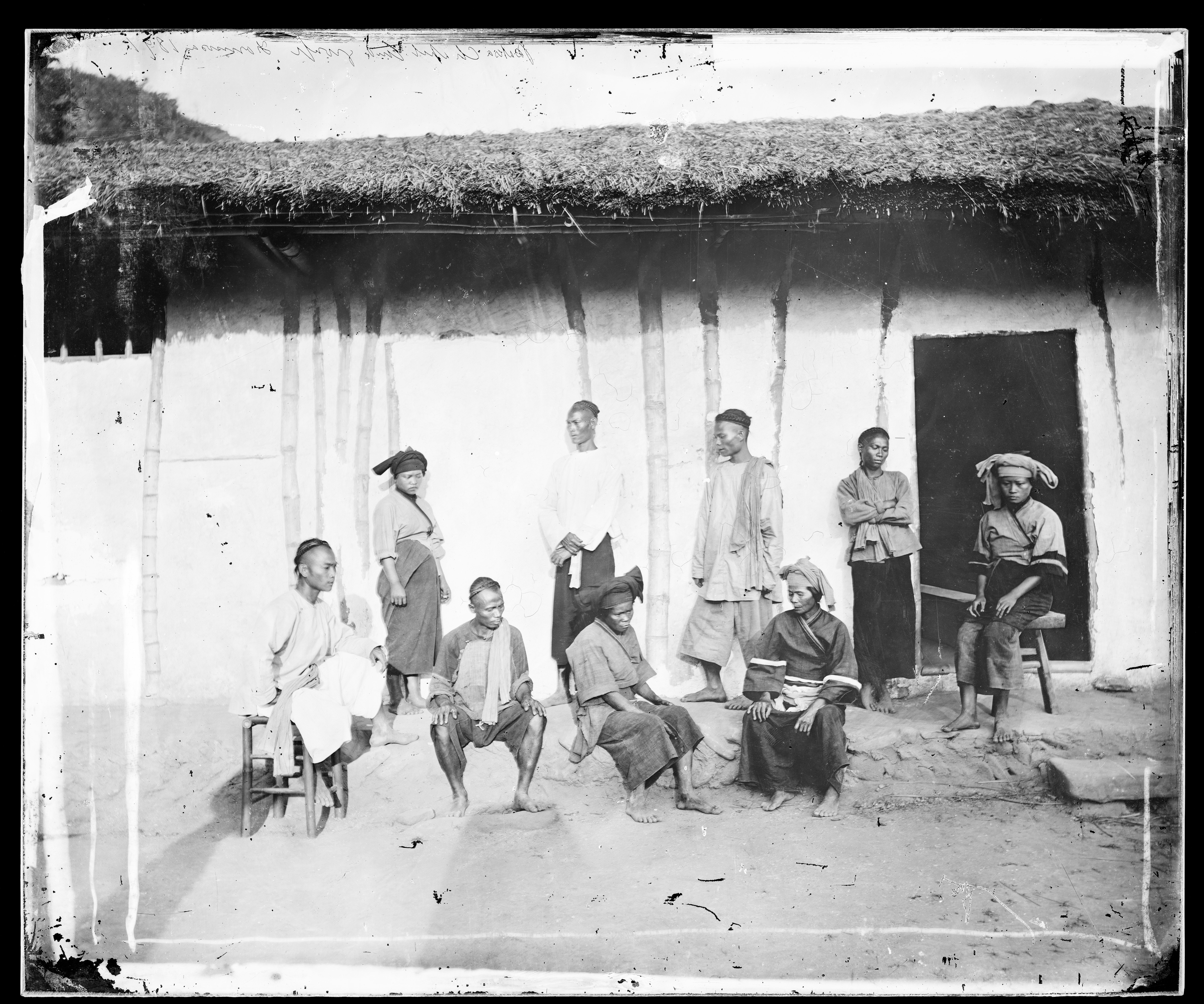
Formosa, 1871

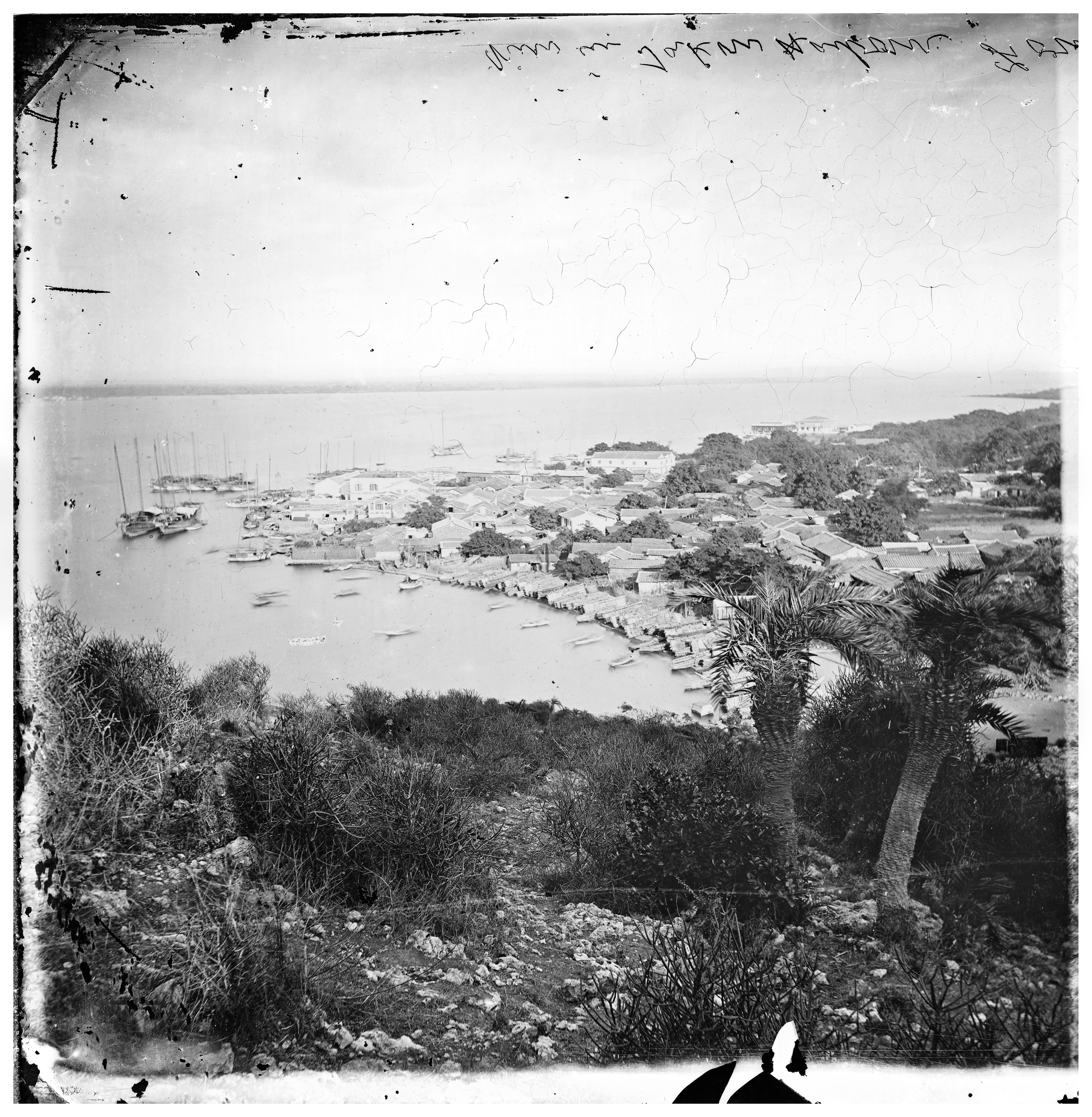
Takow harbour, 1871

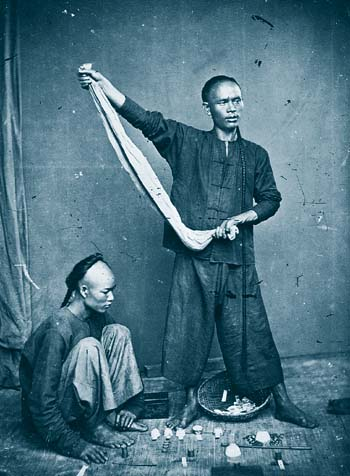
Street Gamblers, c. 1868–1871

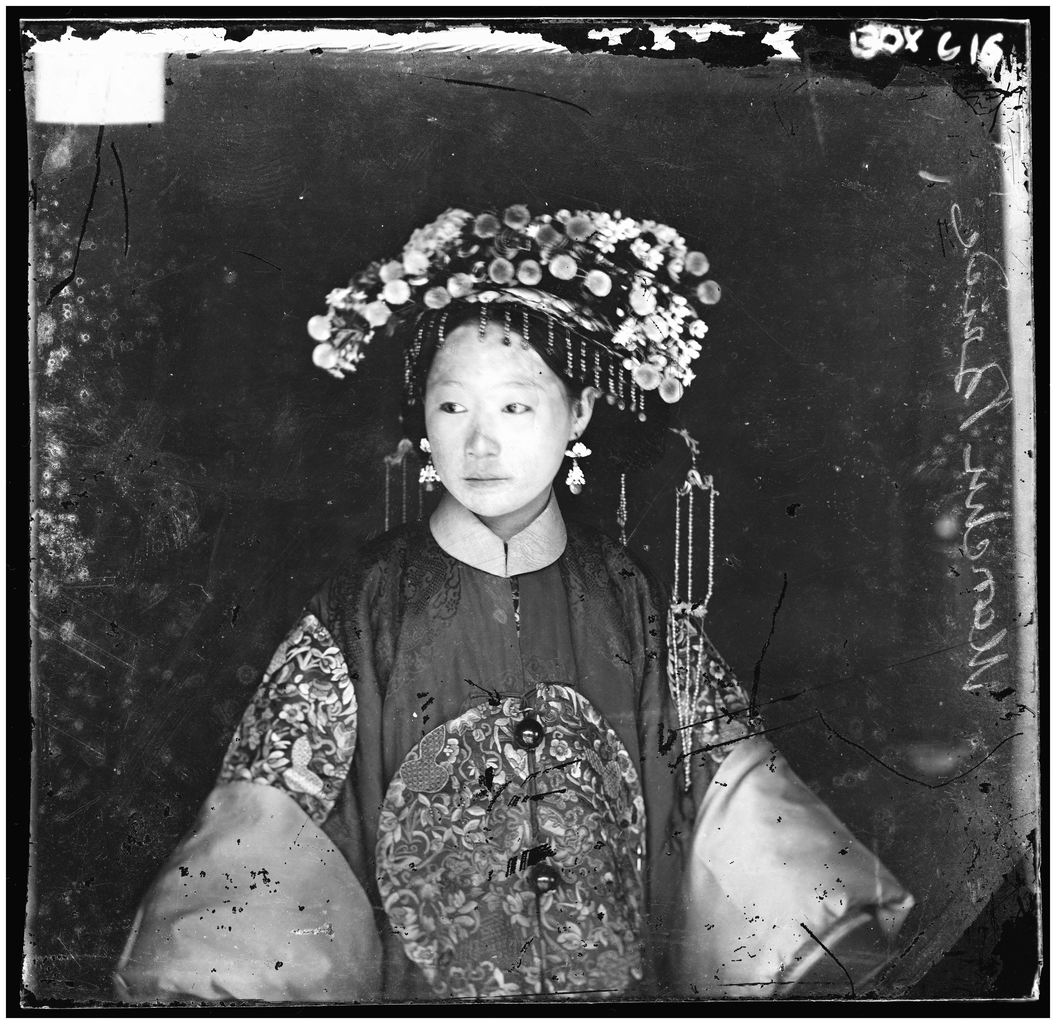
China: A Manchu Bride, 1871

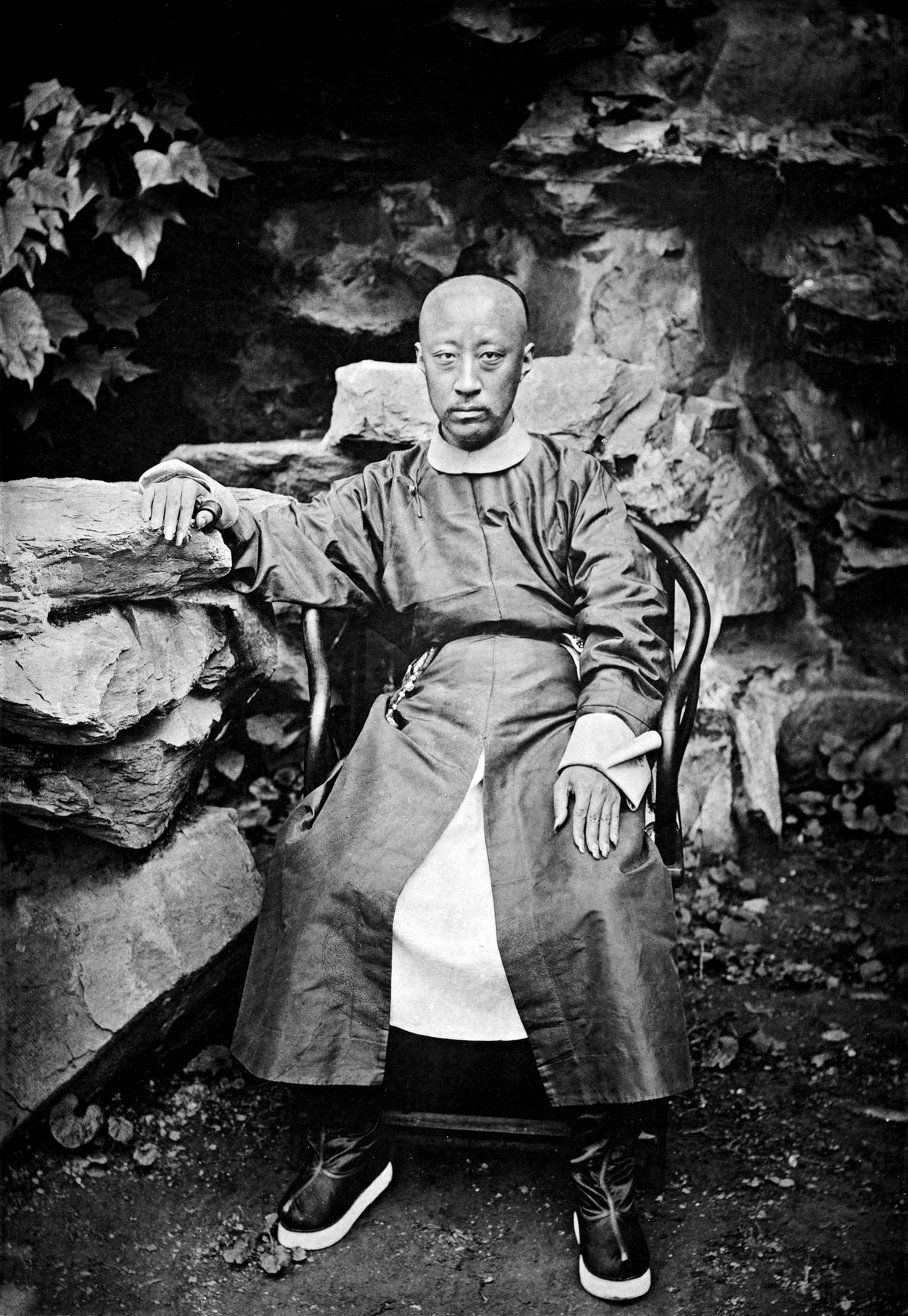
Prince Kung, 1872

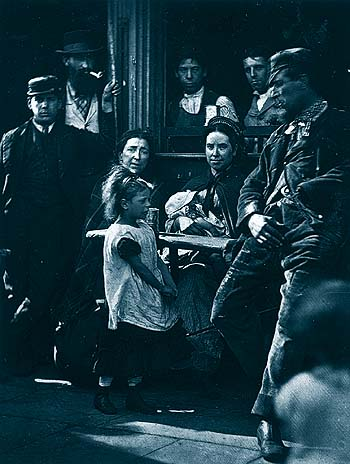
"Hookey Alf" of Whitechapel, 1876–1877

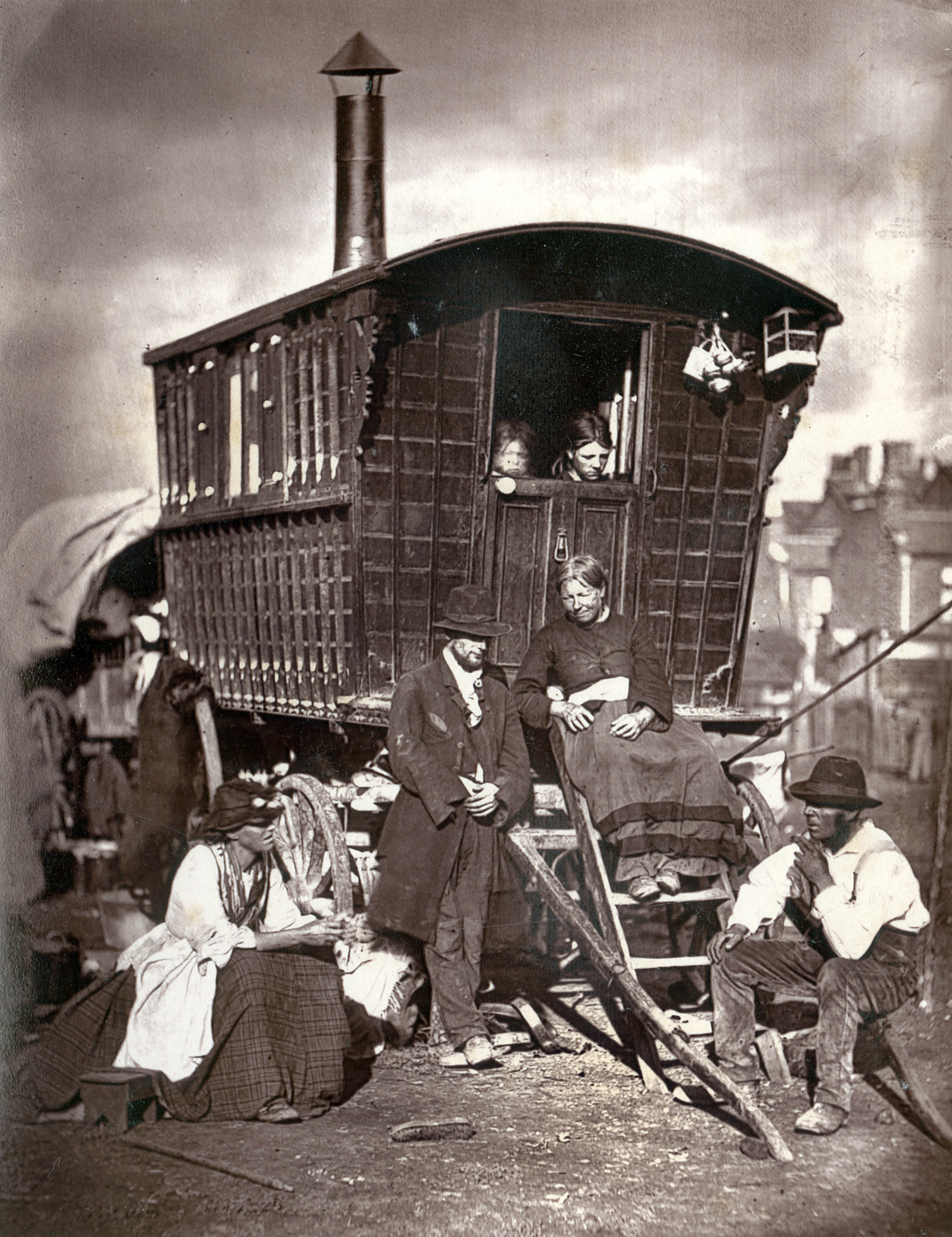
London Nomades, from Thomson's 1877 book Street Life in London, which features Mary Pradd sitting on a caravan's steps

== See also ==
- Wilhelm J. Burger
