= Adolphe Smith Headingley =

English writer and photographer (1846–1925)

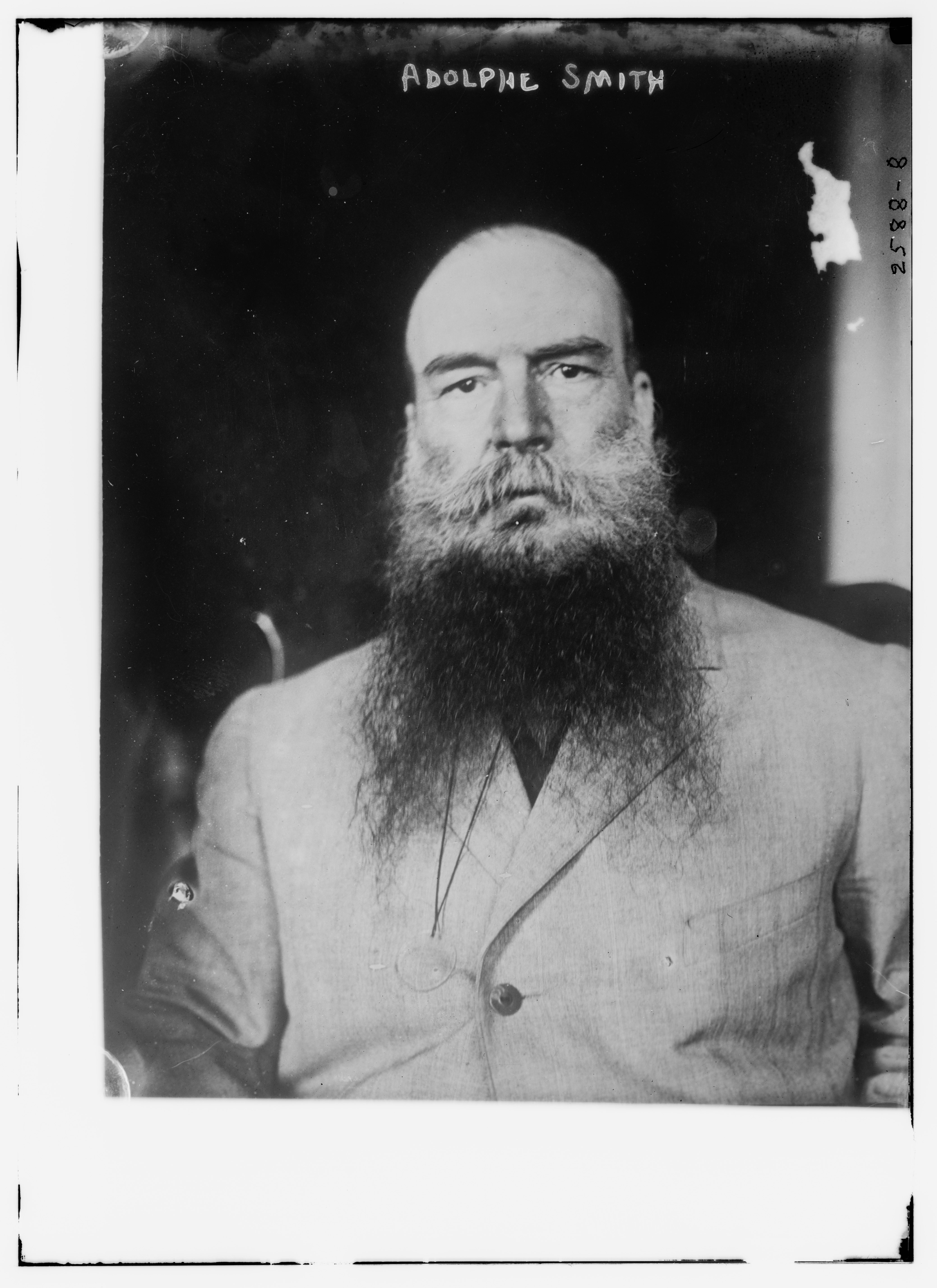
Adolphe Smith

Adolphe Smith Headingley (1846–1925) was a British left-wing political writer. Half-French, Smith Headingley was a member of the First International and took part in the Paris Commune. In 1877–78, he wrote and published the magazine series Street Life in London with photographer John Thomson, to raise awareness of the plight of the city's poor. Smith Headingley played a key role in organising the 1882 International Trades Union Congress and served as an interpreter at successive conferences from 1886 to 1905. It was Smith Headingley that, in the 1890s, popularised the singing of the socialist anthem "The Red Flag" to the tune of "O Tannenbaum".

== Biography ==
Smith Headingley was born in 1846 and was half French. A left-wing political writer (under the name Adolphe Smith) and activist he was a member of the First International (1864–1876). He joined the Paris Commune in 1871 and narrowly escaped execution when the commune was suppressed by the French Army. The following year, he married the author Alice Jerrold in London.

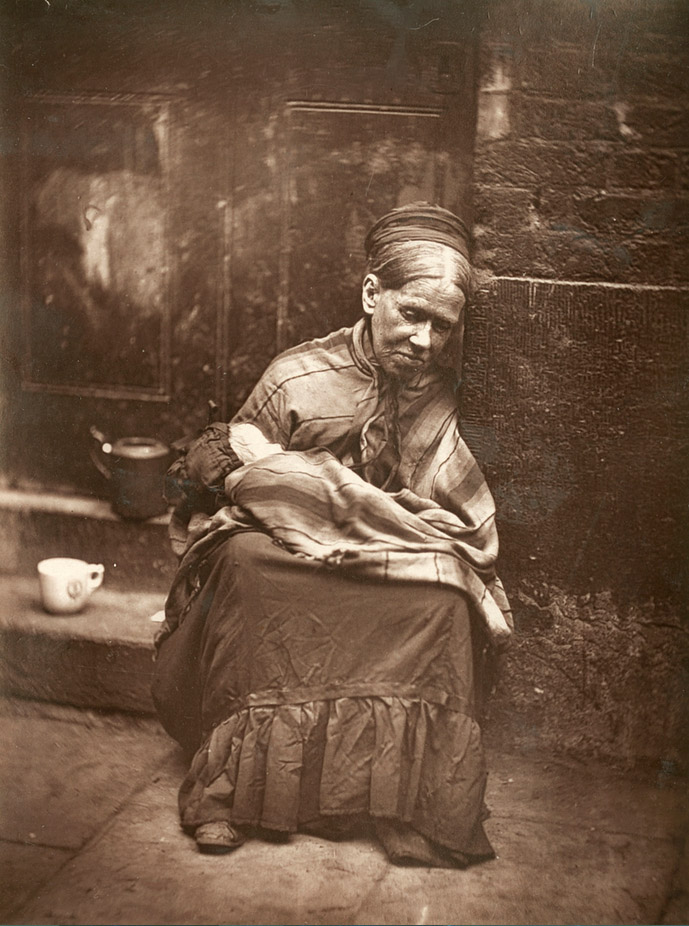
A photograph of a poor woman and child from Street Life taken by Thomson

Smith Headingley worked with photographer John Thomson to produce the magazine series Street Life in London between 1877 and 1878. The 12-issue monthly publication documented the lives of the poor in the city and was intended to raise public awareness of the issue. The authors acknowledged that they had been inspired by a similar project from the early 1850s, London Labour and the London Poor, by journalist Henry Mayhew with woodcut prints after daguerreotypes by Richard Beard. Smith Headingley contributed 24 of the essays in the work and Thomson 12. Critical opinion considered Smith Headingley's contributions to be more detailed and socially relevant. The series was compiled into a book a year later.

After Street Life in London Smith Headingley continued to write on social matters and became renowned as a left-wing campaigner for social reform. Using his fluency in French he played a key role in organising the International Trades Union Congress of November 1882. Smith Headingley became known as "Mr. Interpreter" in trade unionist circles. He served as an interpreter at successive meetings of the International Trades Union Congress from 1886 to 1905.

In the 1890s Smith Headingley popularised the singing of the socialist anthem "The Red Flag" to the tune of "O Tannenbaum". Its author Jim Connell had intended the tune to be sung to the Jacobite tune "The White Cockade", associated with the Irish nationalist movement that Connell supported. Connell disapproved of the change of tune, to which the song remains most closely linked, as he regarded "O Tannenbaum" as "church music" and conservative by nature.

Smith Headingley was an associate of English writer and socialist Henry Hyndman and of the women's suffragists Sylvia, Christabel and Adela Pankhurst. Smith Headingley died in 1925 [Alfreton and Belper Journal, 20 November 1925]. His eulogy was written by barrister and campaigner Ernest Belfort Bax who described him as an "excellent socialist".
