= Thomas Child (photographer) =

English photographer working in China (b. 1841, d. 1898)

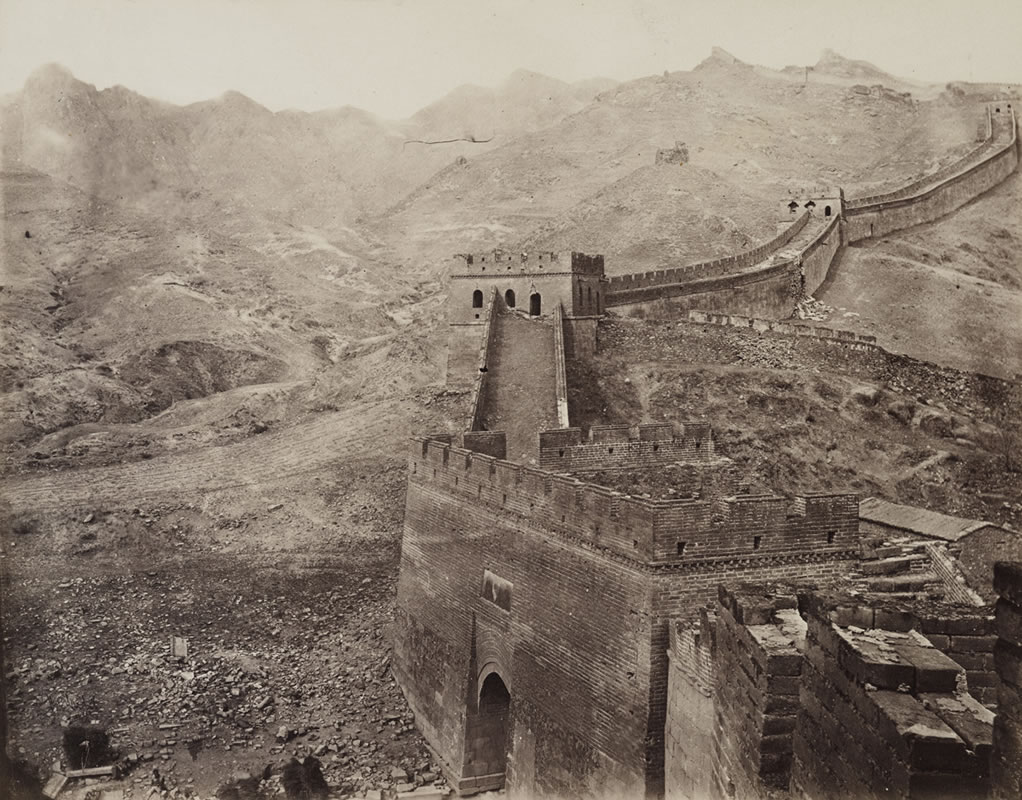
Thomas Child, "Great Wall with Gate, Badaling", 1870s, albumen silver print. Source: Stephan Loewentheil Photography of China Collection

Thomas Child (1841–1898) was an English photographer and engineer best known for his pioneering photography work in China. Child produced a large body of photographs during his time in Beijing in the 1870s and 1880s, a time when virtually no other photographers operated in the city. During the two decades he spent in China, Child compiled the earliest comprehensive photographic catalogue of the customs, architecture, and people of late Qing dynasty Beijing. A keen photographer of architecture, some of Child's images are among the earliest and the only known photographic records of their architectural subjects.

== Life and work ==
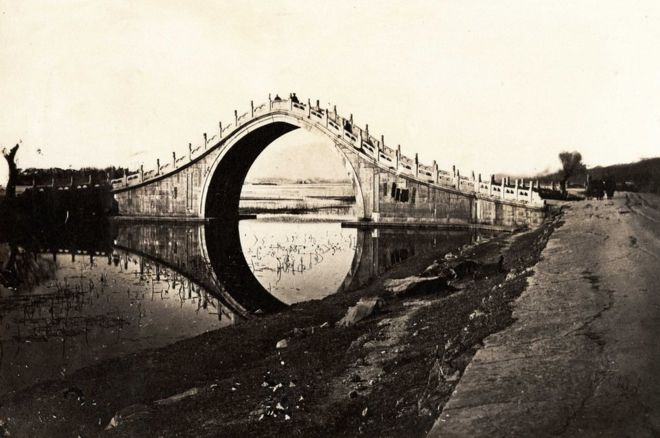
Thomas Child, "Jade Belt Bridge," 1870s, albumen silver print. Source: Stephan Loewentheil Photography of China Collection

Thomas Child was born in Shropshire, England, in 1841 to John and Elizabeth Child. In 1870, Child was hired by Sir Robert Hart to join the Chinese Maritime Customs Service as a gas engineer, and left England for Beijing with his photographic equipment in June of that year. Child lived in Beijing until 1889. When he arrived in Beijing, the city was still largely devoid of foreigners, and only a few photographers had ever produced images in and of the Chinese city. Child immediately set about learning the Chinese language, stating in a letter from November 1870 that he was spending three hours a day with a Chinese tutor; he would later become reasonably fluent. Although his initial employment contract was for only five years, Child's photographic career kept him there for much longer.

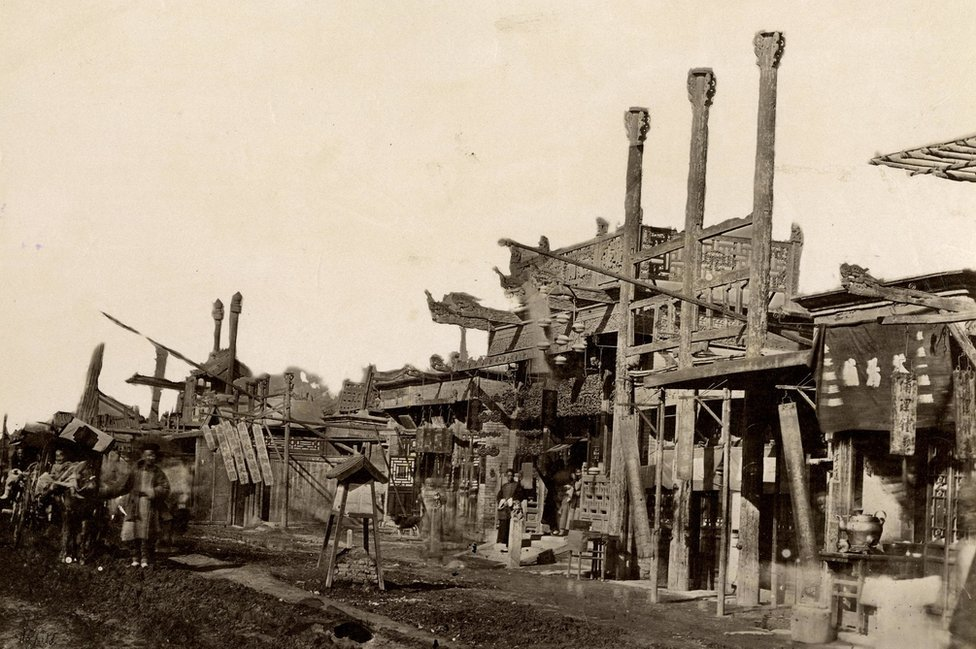
Thomas Child, "Peking Street Shops", 1870s, albumen silver print. Source: Stephan Loewentheil Photography of China Collection

By March 1871, Child had started to photograph the architecture of Beijing. Since there was no commercial photography studio in Beijing at the time, Child saw demand develop quickly for his photographs and began devoting more of his time to photographing the architecture and people of Beijing and the surrounding areas.

Child's renown as a photographer grew significantly in the coming years. In the late 1870s, he became a contributing photographer for The Far East, a periodical published in Japan and China that featured images of both regions from the greatest photographers working in those locations. His images were published in the July 1877, August 1877, December 1877, and January 1878 issues of the quarterly, and an advertisement he took out in the April 1878 issue offered nearly 200 individual "Views of Beijing and its Vicinity" for 50 cents each. Although most of his negatives were created during the 1870s, Child continued to make and sell his prints throughout the 1880s.

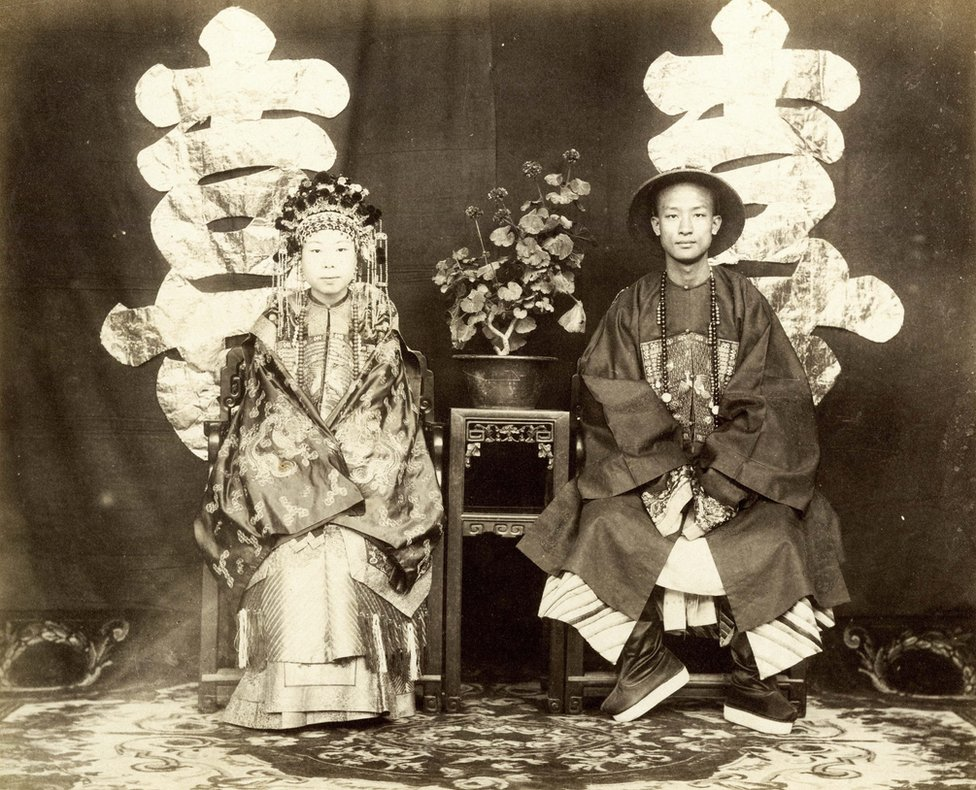
Thomas Child, "Bride and Groom", 1870s, albumen silver print. Source: Stephan Loewentheil Photography of China Collection

Child returned to England in 1889 with his family, except for his eldest son Alfred, also employed with the Chinese Maritime Customs Service, who stayed behind in Beijing as his father's successor. Child formally retired from the Customs service the following year. He purchased a home in Chelsfield, Kent, and, in a nod to his time in China, named it "Chang-an-Tang," loosely translated as "Everlasting Tranquillity Studios". Child died near his home on 27 May 1898, after falling from a horse-drawn carriage and fracturing his skull.

== Photographs of China and Chinese architecture ==
Child photographed landmarks of Chinese architecture such as the Old Summer Palace, the Temple of Heaven, the Peking Observatory, the Great Wall of China, the Forbidden City, the Temple of Azure Clouds, the Hall of Prayer for Good Harvests, and more. He also captured street scenes that show the bustling commerce of late Qing Dynasty Beijing. Although primarily known for his architectural photography, Child was also an accomplished portrait photographer, and created images of pedlars, beggars, religious leaders, ambassadors, and a magnificent wedding portrait of a young aristocratic bride and groom.

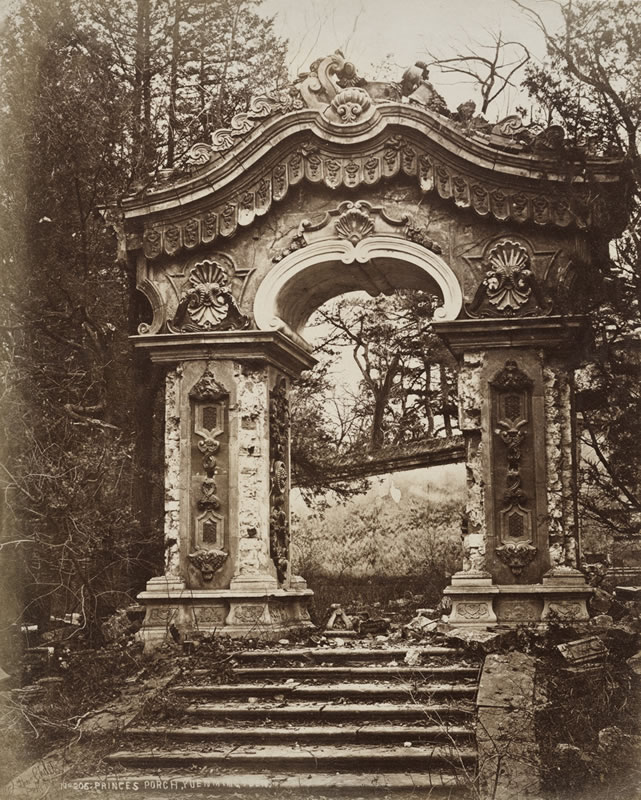
Thomas Child, "Princes Porch, Old Summer Palace (Yuanmingyuan), Beijing," 1870s, albumen silver print. Source: Stephan Loewentheil Photography of China Collection

One of Child's most significant contributions to both 19th-century photography and the study of Chinese architecture and history are his photographs of Yuanmingyuan – known in English as the Old Summer Palace – one of the most potent symbols of China's past. Child's images are among the earliest and most important photographic evidence of particular features at the significant historical site. Child's photograph of the Prince's Porch is of particular importance. It is the only known photographic record of this architectural masterpiece. Additional sites that Child photographed such as the Xiyang Lou and the Fountain Gate would be further destroyed in the Boxer War and subsequent conflicts.

== Surviving photographs and desiderata ==
The Stephan Loewentheil Photography of China Collection contains the most significant archive of Child's life work, including the largest group of his photographs of Beijing, Child's personal diaries, and the only known set of his original glass plate negatives. Child's diaries "provide fascinating insight" into his journey to China, and describe "local inhabitants, cultural and religious practices, buildings and architecture but also ... detailed descriptions of photographs."

Child's original albumen print photographs are scarce, and rarely come up for sale. A group of 31 of Child's original albumen prints, from the collection of scholar Colin Osman, were auctioned at Sotheby's in 2006, one of the first notable contemporary auction results for Child. Child's albumen prints have also been discovered in albums alongside the work of other Chinese and international photographers of the region such as Lai Afong, Felice Beato and William Saunders. Child's photographs are held in the permanent collections of museums such as the Metropolitan Museum of Art in New York, NY; the George Eastman Museum in Rochester, NY; the Peabody Essex Museum in Salem, Mass.; and the Getty Museum in Los Angeles, CA.

== Legacy ==
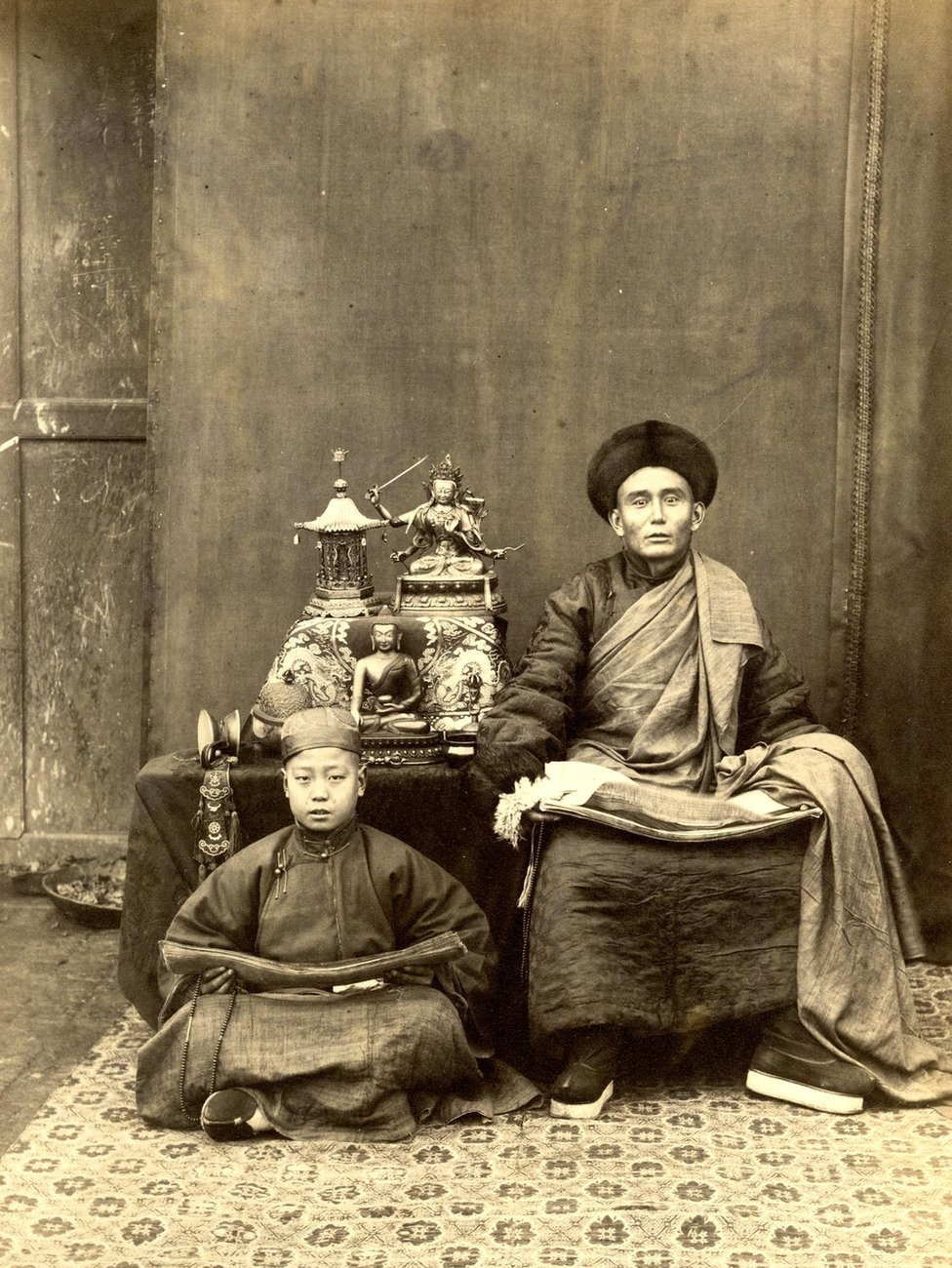
Thomas Child, "Mongolian Lama", 1870s, albumen silver print. Source: Stephan Loewentheil Photography of China Collection

In 2015, the first modern exhibition of Child's work was held at the China Exchange in London, as part of Asia Art Week. The exhibition, Qing Dynasty Peking: Thomas Child’s Photographs, featured more than 40 of Child's photographs from the Stephan Loewentheil Photography of China Collection – holder of the largest and most important group of Child's photographs – many of which had never been publicly displayed. In October 2016, the exhibition travelled to New York, where it was presented at the Sidney Mishkin Gallery at Baruch College. The exhibition was praised by news outlets such as The New York Times, BBC, and The Atlantic.

In 2020, a group of Child's photographs, also from the Stephan Loewentheil Photography of China Collection, were presented at the Carl A. Kroch Rare Manuscript Collection of the Cornell University Library in the exhibition Lai Fong and Thomas Child: Photographs of Late Qing Dynasty Chinese Street Life, "the first exhibition devoted to 19th-century photographs of street life in Chinese cities."

Unlike other foreign photographers who passed through Beijing – including Felice Beato and John Thomson – Child's work demonstrates a more invested and knowledgeable approach to the sites and people of Beijing, owing perhaps to his status as a resident. Child's photographs were appreciated by both international and Chinese clientele during his lifetime, and his images were circulated around the world. Curator Stacey Lambrow has stated that "Thomas Child is under-recognized. What he did was remarkable, creating ... the most comprehensive photographic portrayal of 19th-century Peking."

== Chinese language sources ==
- 洛文希尔中国摄影收藏
- 清华大学艺术博物馆、洛文希尔收藏编.世相与映像——洛文希尔摄影收藏中的19世纪中国[C].北京：清华大学出版社，2018.
- [英]泰瑞·贝内特.中国摄影史：西方摄影师1861–1879[M].徐婷婷译.北京：中国摄影出版社，2013.

== See also ==
- Photographs of Beijing by Thomas Child
