= Lai Afong =

Chinese photographer (1838/39–1890)

- 黎芳
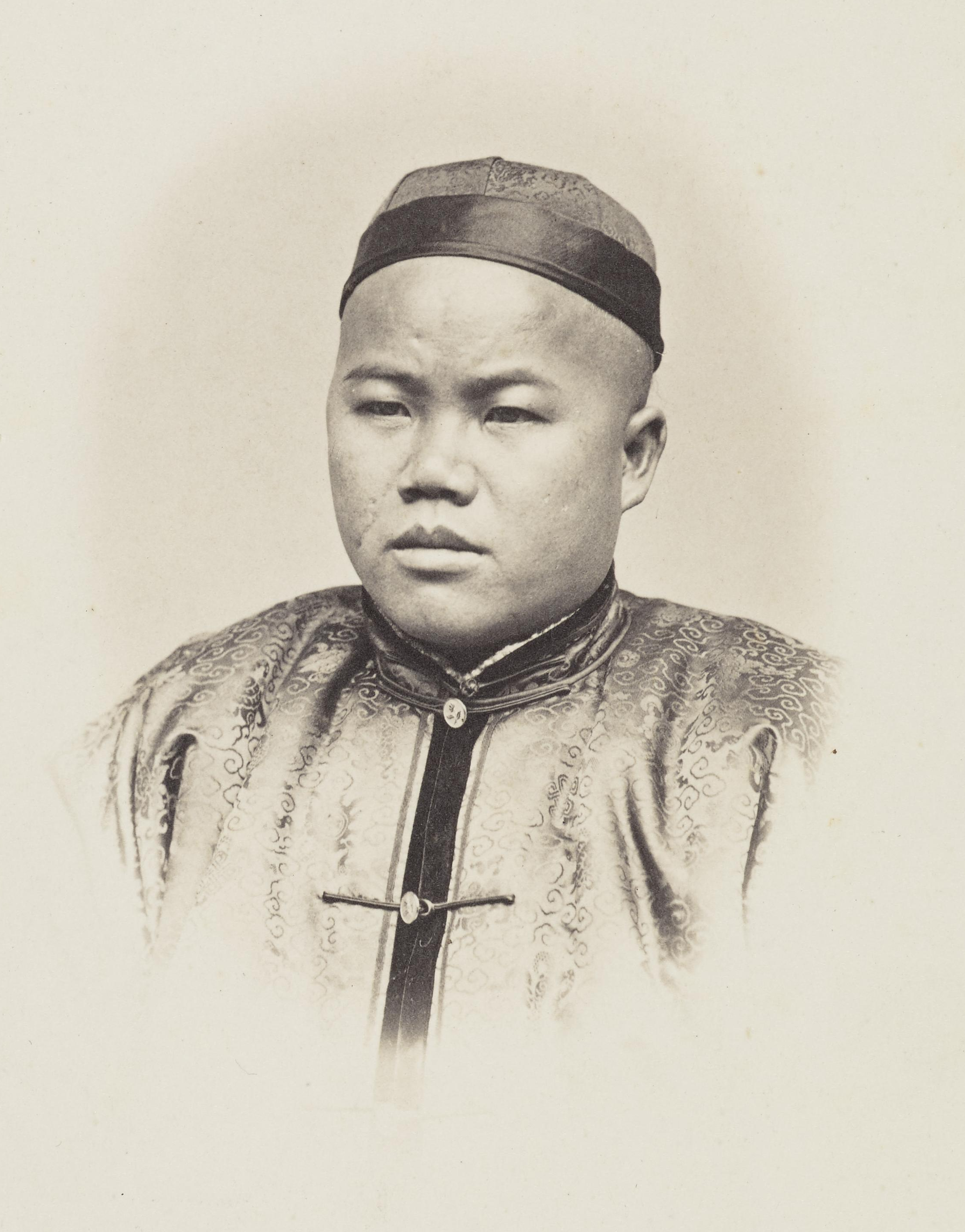
- Afong, c. 1870
- Born: 1838 or 1839; Gaoming, China
- Died: April 19, 1890 (aged 51); British Hong Kong
- Other names: Lai Ah Fong, Huafang; Fang Lai, Lihua Fang; Li Fang, A'Fong Lai; 賴阿芳, 賴華芳, 黎華芳, 華芳
- Occupation: Photographer
- Years active: 1859–1890

Lai Afong or Lai Fong (Chinese: 黎芳; 1838 or 1839 – 1890) was a Chinese photographer who established Afong Studio, considered to be the most successful photographic studio in the late Qing dynasty. He is widely acknowledged as the most significant Chinese photographer of the nineteenth century.

== Early life ==
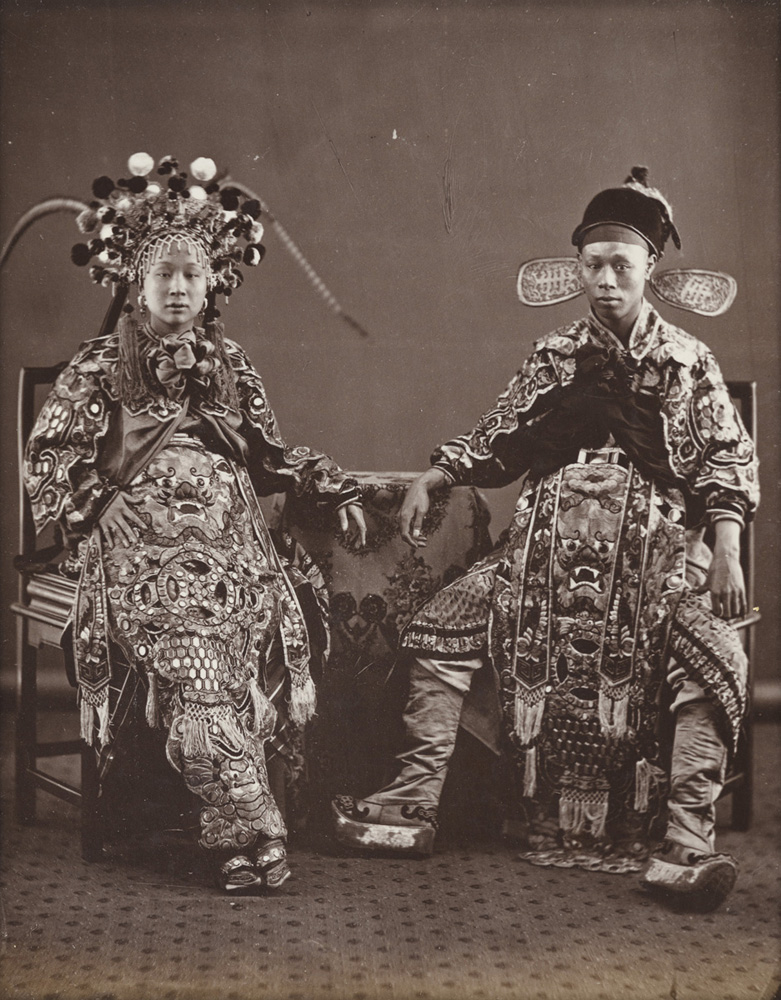
Lai Fong. "Chinese Performers." 1870s. Albumen silver print. Source: Stephan Loewentheil Photography of China Collection.

Lai Afong was born in Gaoming, Guangdong and arrived in Hong Kong in the 1850s as a refugee of the Taiping Rebellion. It is not known how he learned the wet-plate collodion process, but it is said that by as early as 1859, he had learned the art of photography.

== Career ==
At some point between 1865 and 1867, Lai Afong worked at the Hong Kong studio of Portuguese photographer José Joaquim Alves de Silveira; by 1870, the earliest known announcement of the Afong Studio was printed as an advertisement in the Hong Kong Daily Press. Lai Afong's subject matters ranged from portraits and social life pictures to cityscapes and landscapes. Little is known about his life, although many of his images survive today as testament to his extraordinary talent. After Lai Afong's death, the business was taken over by his son in the 1890s.

Lai Afong traveled through the provinces of Fujian, Guangdong, Hebei, Songjiang (today Shanghai), and Hong Kong, creating photographs. His collection of views included photographs of masterpieces of Chinese architecture such as sites within the Summer Palace and the Fragrant Hills Pagoda in Beijing, the Temple of the Six Banyan Trees in Guangzhou, and numerous others, as well as magnificent panoramas of such locations as Victoria harbor and Gulangyu island. As Lai Afong's reputation quickly grew, both Chinese and foreign clientele flocked to his studio for portrait sessions, including some of China's most important people such as Qing dynasty official Li Hongzhang. According to the verso of many of his Carte de visite works, he was photographer to Governor of Hong Kong Sir Arthur Kennedy KCB and Grand Duke Alexei Alexandrovich of Russia.

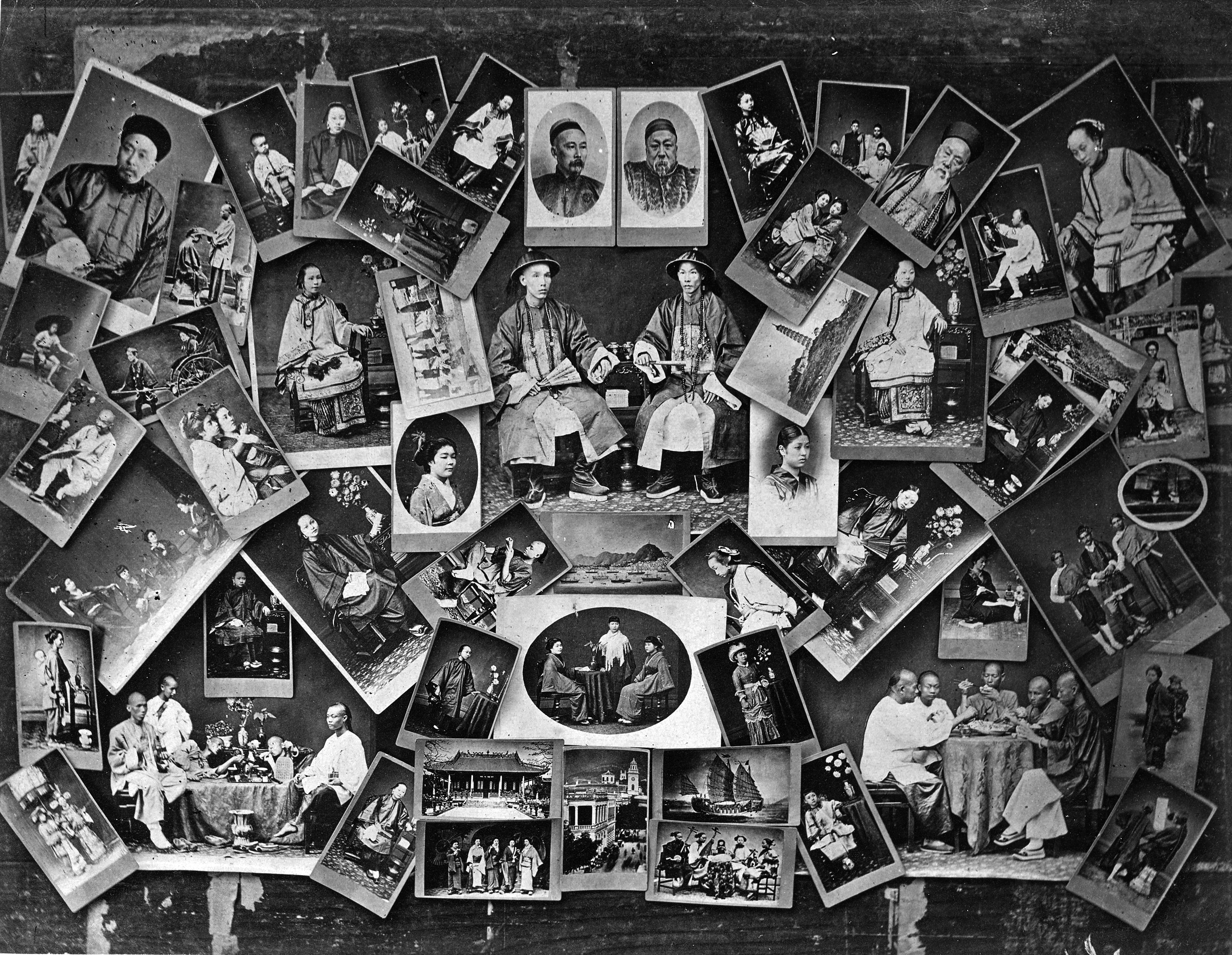
Picture wall in Afong Studio

Lai Afong was the most successful of his generation of Chinese photographers in appealing to both a Chinese and foreign cosmopolitan clientele. Lai Afong advertised in English-language newspapers – offering a "Larger, and more complete collection of Views than any other Establishment in the Empire of China" – and the artist captioned much of his work in both Chinese and English. Afong Studio photographs were sold to both Chinese patrons – both those local to Hong Kong and those visiting from other parts of China – and foreign visitors to China.

The Afong Studio became a destination and training ground for foreign photographers in the region, and photographers such as Emil Rusfeldt and D.K. Griffith began their careers under the tutelage of Lai Afong. In 1875, Griffith claimed that his mentor had "entered the arena of European art, associating his name with photography in its best form, and justly stands first of his countrymen in Hong Kong." John Thomson, a Scottish photographer working in China at the time, praised Lai Afong's images as "extremely well-executed, [and] remarkable for their artistic choice of position," in his book The Straits of Malacca, Indo-China, and China.

Lai Afong seems to have been the only Chinese photographer of his generation to be embraced by his foreign contemporaries. However, his work is distinct among them, as many of Lai Afong’s photographic compositions show the technical and aesthetic influence of traditional Chinese painting, known as guóhuà. Additionally, Lai Afong favored the panorama more than any other photographer working in China in the 19th century, earning his work a place among the giants of 19th century landscape photography such as Carleton Watkins in America and Gustave Le Gray in France. No other nineteenth-century Chinese photographer offered as extensive and diverse a view of late Qing dynasty China.

== Legacy ==
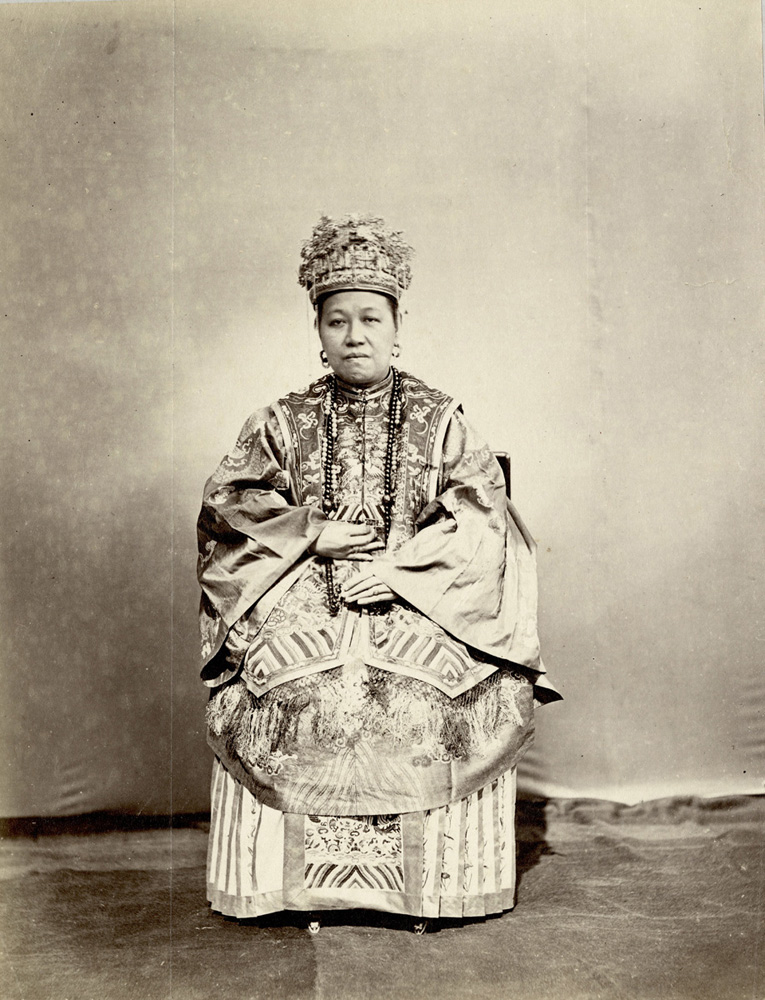
Lai Fong. "A Mandarin’s Wife." 1870s. Albumen silver print. Source: Stephan Loewentheil Photography of China Collection.

In February 2020, the Johnson Museum of Art at Cornell University presented Lai Fong (Ca. 1839-1890): Photographer of China, the first museum exhibition dedicated to Lai Fong. The majority of the photographs exhibited were on loan from Stephan Loewentheil China Photography Collection, one of the world's foremost collections of Early Chinese Photography. Although in-person viewing was cut short by the COVID-19 pandemic, the exhibition received praise from international news outlets such as China's largest newspaper, People's Daily for "truly [showing] the life of Chinese society in the 19th century, telling the story of China in that era" and in Fine Books and Collections for showcasing "magnificent views of a rapidly growing Hong Kong, Guangzhou, Beijing, Shanghai, Fuzhou, and Xiamen, and important early portraits of the diverse people of late Qing Dynasty China."

After languishing in near obscurity for decades after his death, the presence of his work in archives such as the Stephan Loewentheil China Photography Collection has helped to expose Lai Afong to a wider contemporary audience. Lai Afong's photographs are currently held in the permanent collections of the Metropolitan Museum of Art, the J. Paul Getty Museum, the National Galleries of Scotland, and several other prominent museum collections.

== Identifying Afong Studio photographs ==
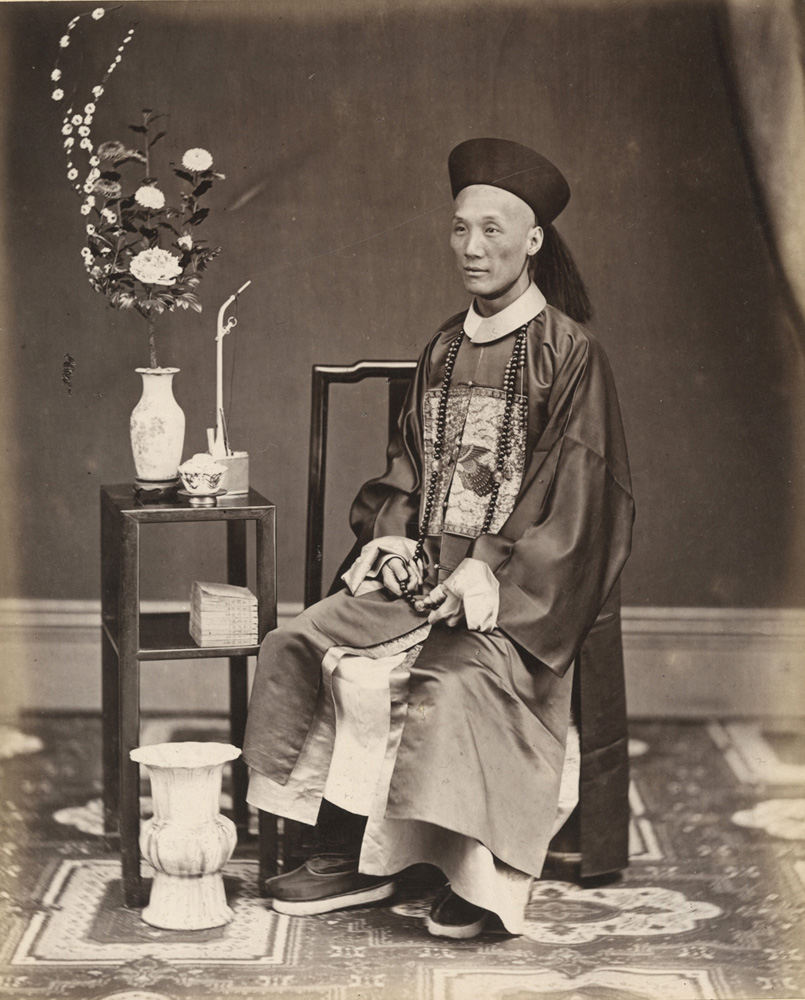
Lai Fong. "Portrait of an Official." 1870s. Albumen silver print. Source: Stephan Loewentheil Photography of China Collection.

Several obstacles make it difficult to reliably identify the artists who photographed nineteenth-century China: the scarcity of material which is scattered around the world is seldom correctly recorded or catalogued, and the few identifiers and indexes that exist (artist, studio, location, etc.) are often erroneous. When early photographers went out of business or left China, the contents of their studios (including their glass plate negatives) were sold or auctioned off, and were often acquired by other photographers working in China who would then make new prints from the negatives to be incorporated into their own stock. Furthermore, especially in a country as large as China, travelers would often purchase photographs by several photographers they visited throughout their trips, and would combine them into a single album upon their return. As such, 19th century photograph albums, even those bearing the label of a particular studio, are often the work not only of that studio, but of several other unaccredited photographers as well.

Despite Lai Afong's prominence, relatively few works can be securely identified as being from his hand. The scarcity of original photographs and absence of archival records make it challenging to identify Lai Afong's work. Although photographs printed from Lai Afong's own negatives dominated his photography studio's production, The Afong Studio was known to occasionally include prints from negatives made by other photographers in albums it produced. This phenomenon extended to other studios as well, and Lai Afong's photographs would often find their way into albums produced by other studios, or into albums assembled by the purchasers of the prints. Since Lai Afong was a "master photographer with a highly attuned artistic sense," he only incorporated work from well-regarded foreign photographers – such as Milton Miller, John Thomson, and Dutton & Michaels. For example, the album People and Views of China, attributed to Lai Afong, contains images from Milton Miller, St. John Edwards, and other unidentified photographers. However, as Lai Fong expanded his collection of views through extensive photographic expeditions, he replaced the negatives by others with his own views. Afong Studio albums created after circa 1880 appear to contain few or no images from other photographers.

== Gallery ==
Selected photographs by Lai Afong (Note: See more of Lai's images on Wikimedia Commons)

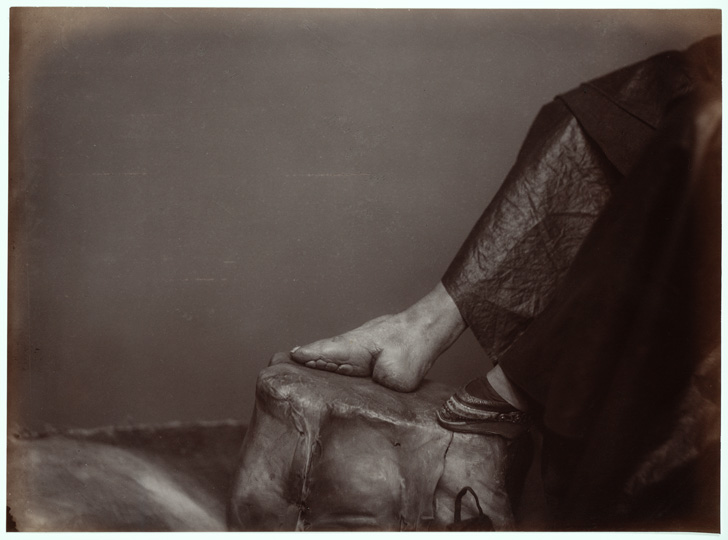
Golden Lily Foot

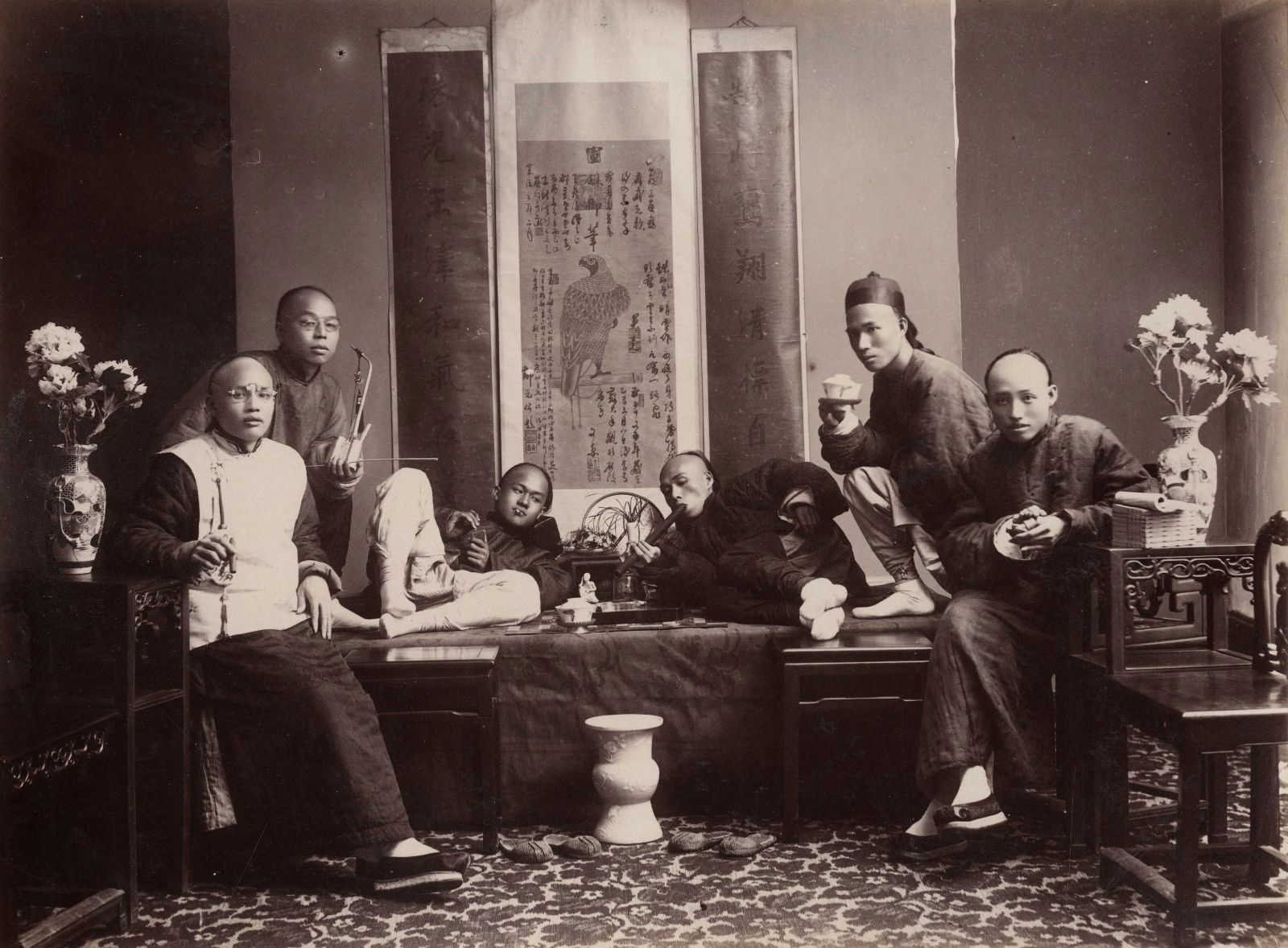
Opium smokers

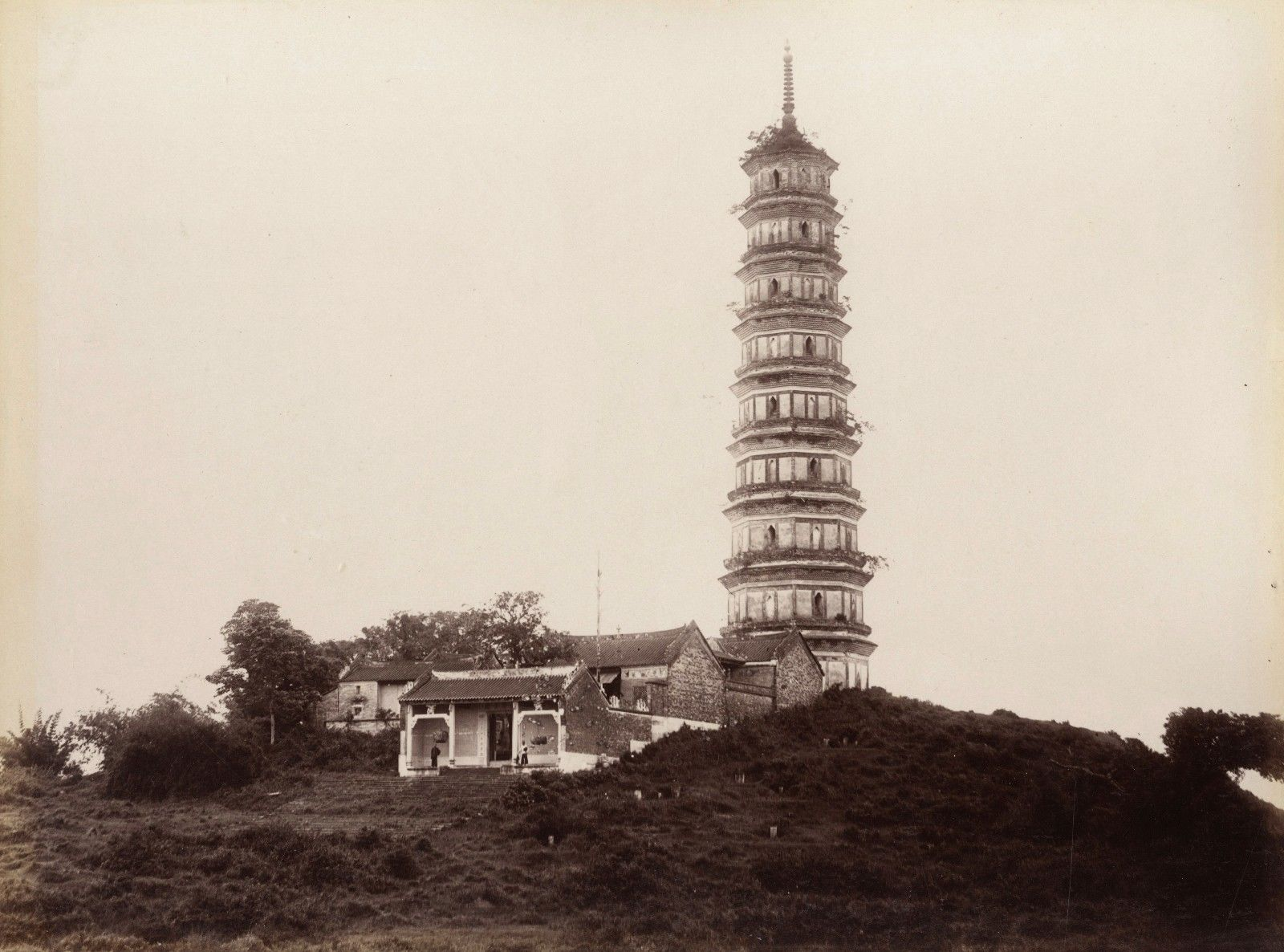
Temple of the Six Banyan Trees

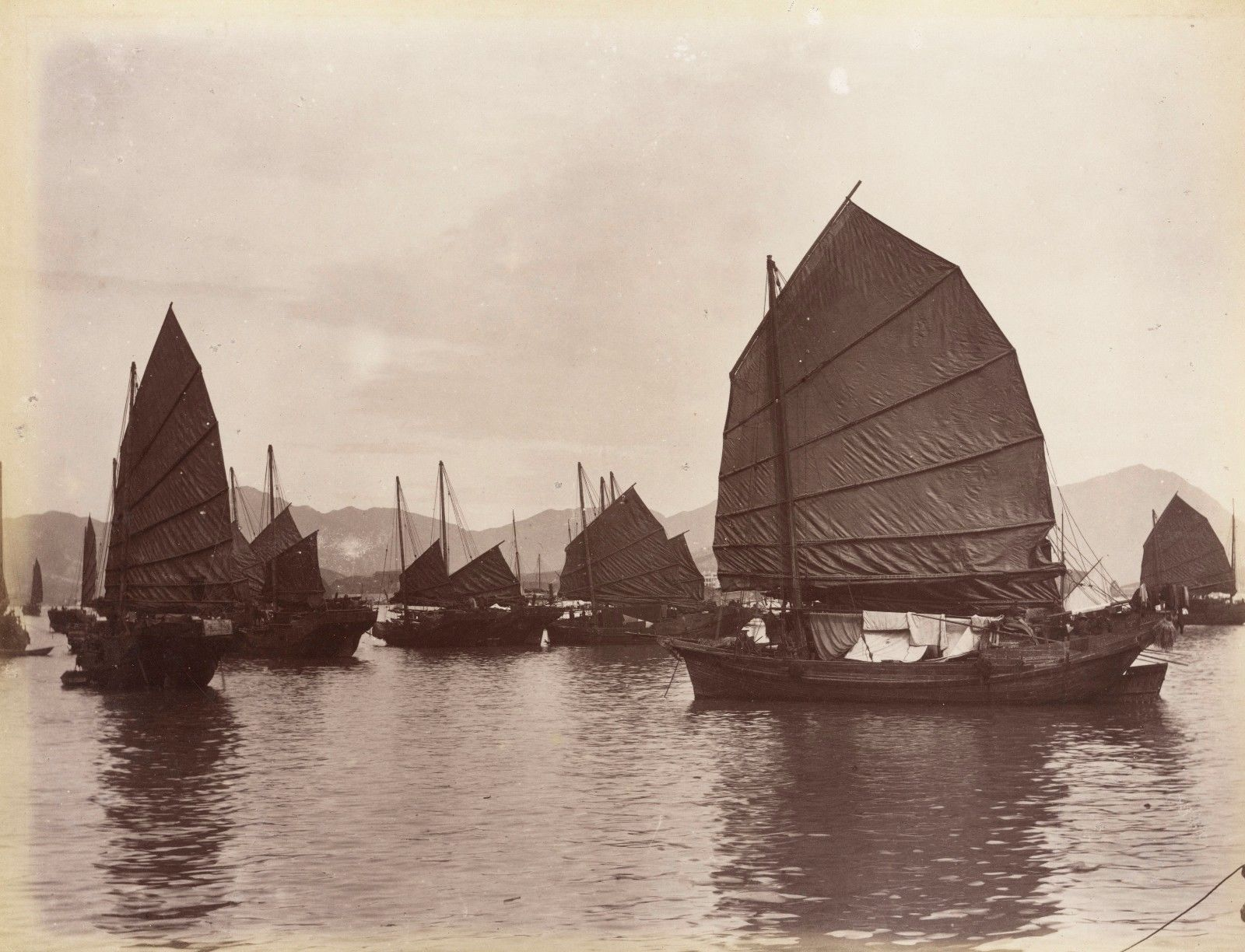
Junks in Guangzhou

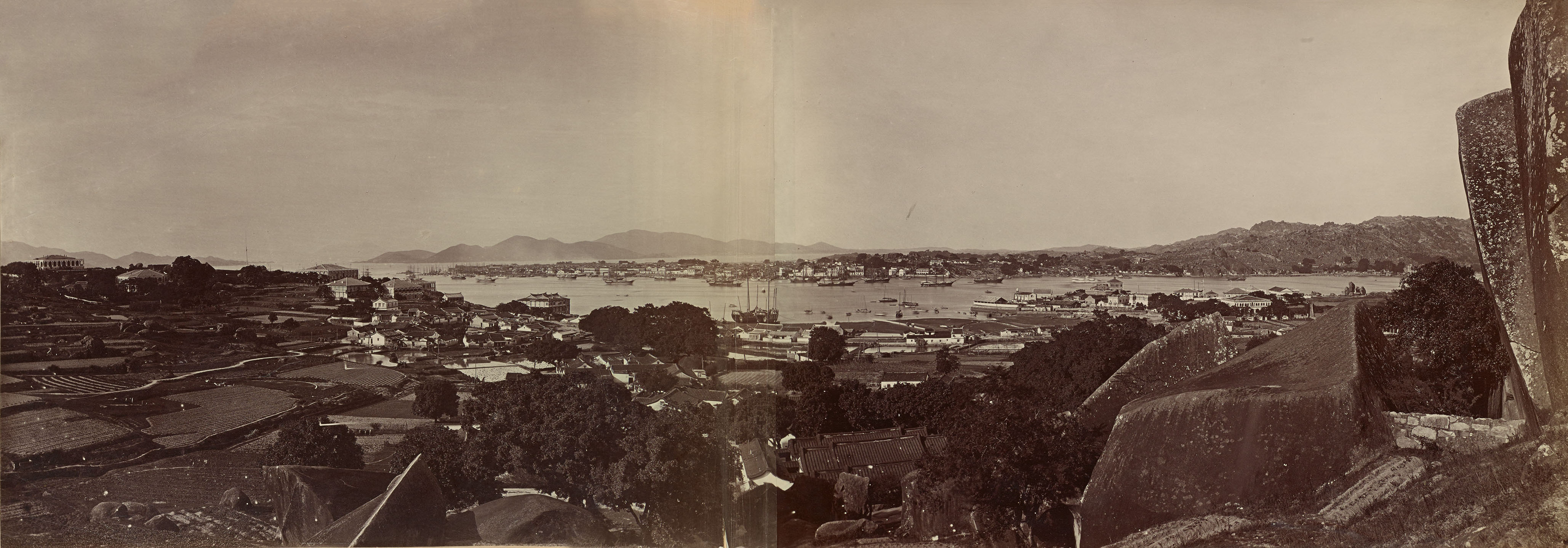
Panorama of Gulangyu Island and Amoy

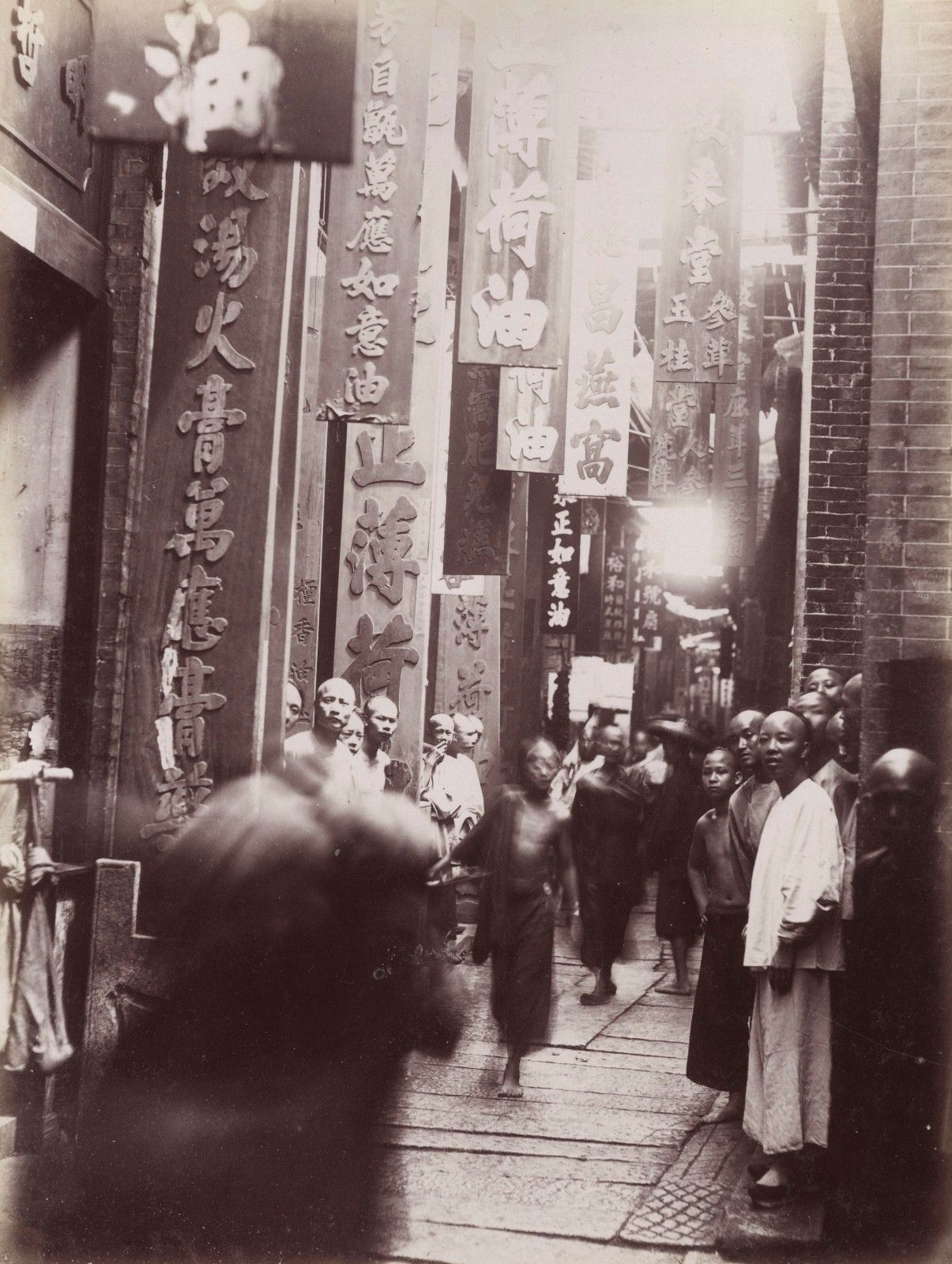
A commercial street in Guangzhou

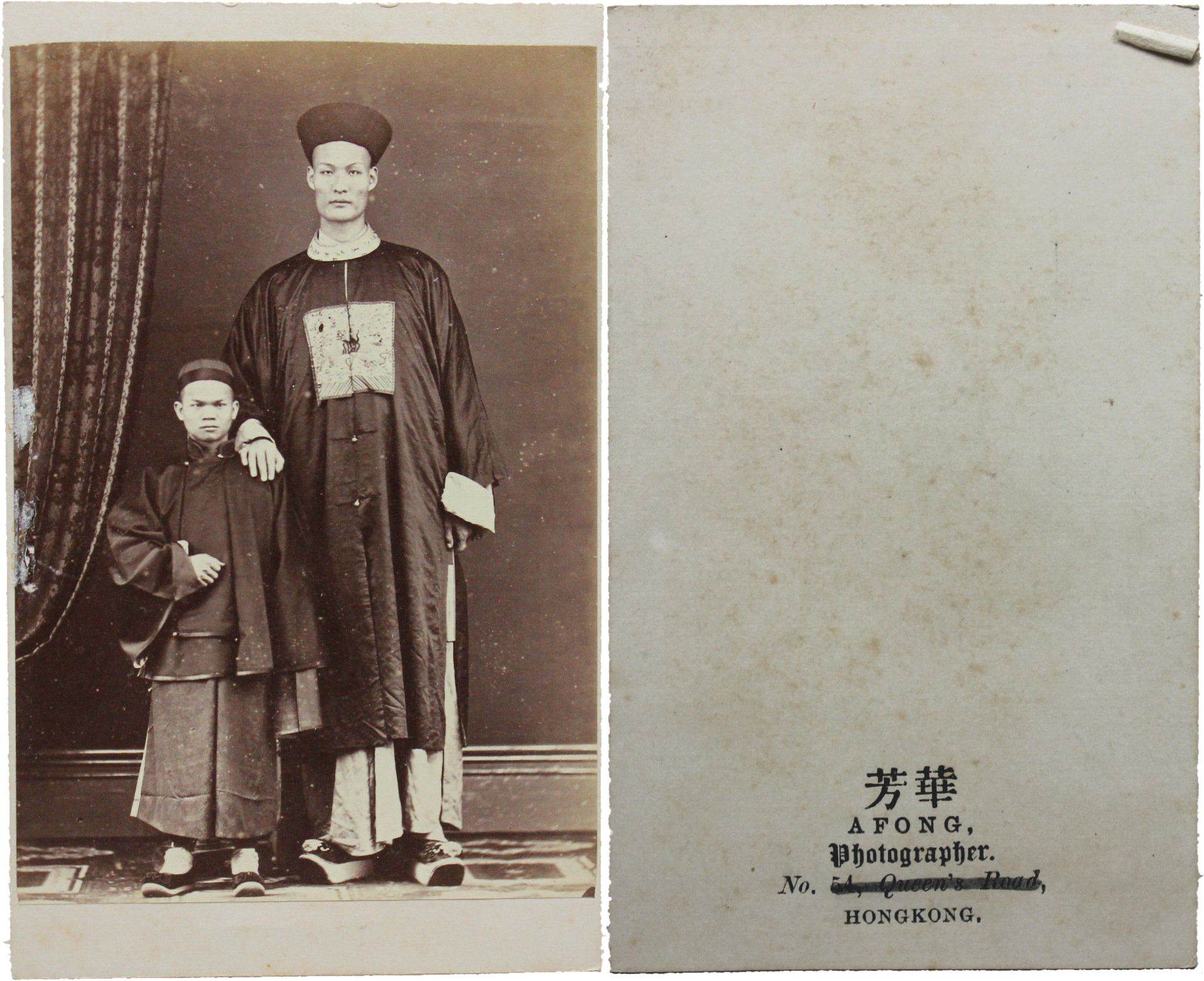
Zhan Shichai

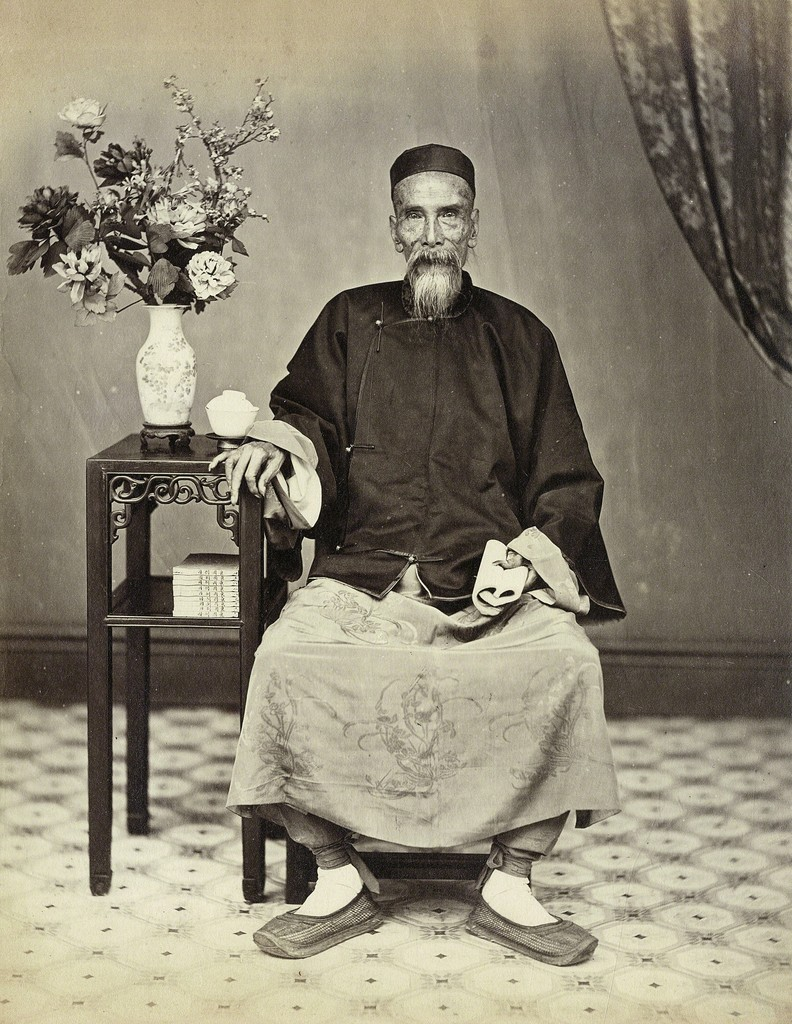
studio portrait

== Albums ==
- Album of photographs of Peking and its environs
- An album mainly of landscape photographs of China
- From Afong, Photographer
- Images related to Shanghai and other Chinese cities
- People and views of China

== See also ==
- Photography in China

== Chinese language sources ==
- * 洛文希尔中国摄影收藏
- 清华大学艺术博物馆、洛文希尔收藏编.世相与映像——洛文希尔摄影收藏中的19世纪中国[C].北京：清华大学出版社，2018.
- [英]泰瑞·贝内特.中国摄影史：中国摄影师1844-1897[M].徐婷婷译.北京：中国摄影出版社，2014.
- [英]泰瑞·贝内特.中国摄影史：1842-1860 [M].徐婷婷译.北京：中国摄影出版社，2011.
