= Stephan Loewentheil =

American antiquarian and rare book and photograph collector

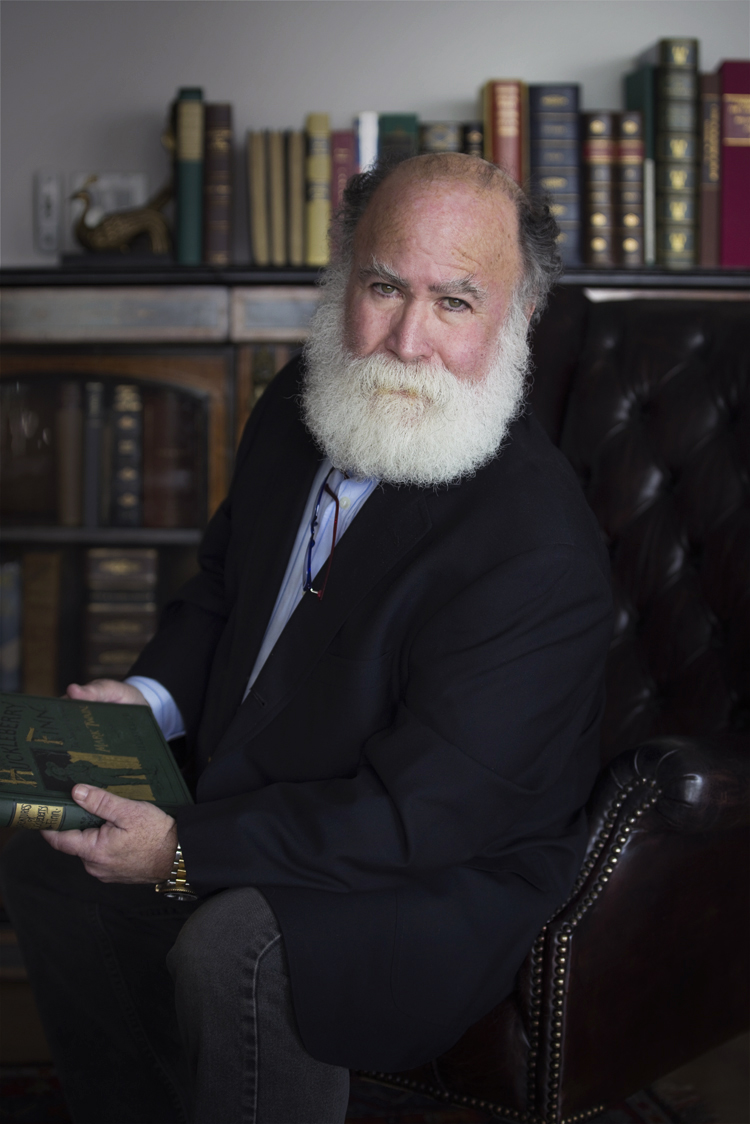
Stephan Loewentheil, New York, 2018. Photograph by Timur York

Stephan Loewentheil (born 1950) is an American antiquarian and a rare book and photograph collector. He is the founder and president of the 19th Century Rare Book and Photograph Shop, located in New York, New York and Baltimore, Maryland. Over a career spanning four decades, Loewentheil "has excelled … in unearthing obscure bibliographic details leading to the acquisition of under-appreciated rarities, seminal documents and early historic photographic images." Loewentheil has been described as a "super-collector," whose clients include celebrities, heads of state, American presidents, and some of the most prominent private collectors and institutional clients of rare books and photographs.

== Early life ==
Born in Brooklyn in 1950, Stephan Loewentheil was raised in New Rochelle, New York, where he attended New Rochelle High School. In 1968, he enrolled in Washington & Jefferson College, where he graduated cum laude with a bachelor's degree in history. In 1975, Loewentheil graduated from Cornell University Law School with a Juris Doctor.

He later moved to Baltimore, Maryland, where he managed a historical neighborhood restoration and redevelopment project. He devoted increasing time and energy to collecting rare books, a passion he had nurtured since his mid-20s. Eventually, Loewentheil opened his rare book store in Baltimore, calling it the 19th Century Rare Book and Photograph Shop.

== Rare book and photograph acquisitions and sales ==
=== The White House ===
During the 1980s, Loewentheil began selling books to the White House, through a relationship with Joseph Verner Reed Jr., Chief of Protocol to President George H. W. Bush. Reed suggested that antique books on American history and culture be given as official state gifts to foreign dignitaries, and sought the help of Mr. Loewentheil to procure these gifts. Upon Soviet President Mikhail Gorbachev's visit to Washington in 1990 to sign the Chemical Weapons Accord, he was presented with an original 1804 edition of John Marshall's biography of George Washington, which was acquired from the 19th Century Rare Book and Photograph Shop. Loewentheil continued this relationship with the White House through the Obama administration.

=== Rare book acquisitions ===
Loewentheil has purchased several high-profile rare books and manuscripts at auction throughout his career.

In 2010, Loewentheil purchased one of the few remaining privately owned copies of William Shakespeare's First Folio at a Sotheby's auction in London, one of multiple copies of the First Folio he has owned over the years. Charles Darwin has long been of particular interest to Loewentheil, who purchased a leaf of Darwin's original manuscript of On the Origin of Species for $250,000 at Sotheby's in 2016.

Loewentheil is a leading collector of and dealer in Edgar Allan Poe books and manuscripts. In 1991, he acquired the first edition of Poe's first book, Tamerlane and Other Poems, one of twelve extant copies. In 1992, Loewentheil published The Poe Catalogue: A descriptive catalogue of the Stephan Loewentheil collection of Edgar Allan Poe material. He was awarded an honorary membership by the Poe Studies Association in 2009 for his contribution to Poe scholarship.

On October 14, 2020, Loewentheil bid and won another copy of the complete First Folio of Comedies, Histories and Tragedies by William Shakespeare. The volume was published in 1623 by English actors John Heminges and Henry Condell, friends of the playwright. After a six-minute bidding battle between three telephone buyers at Christie's New York, Loewentheil prevailed with a bid of $9.98 million—making it the most expensive printed volume of literature sold at auction to date. This volume, at least the fifth copy of the First Folio that Loewentheil has owned – and one of only six known complete copies in private hands – had been owned since 1977 by Mills College, a private four-year, women-only, liberal arts college in Oakland, California.

In June 2024, Loewentheil acquired a copy of William Blake's Songs of Innocence and of Experience with a winning bid of $4.32 million at Sotheby's. The book was etched, printed, and hand colored by Blake and is one of only six copies in private hands.

=== Judaica ===
In 2015, Loewentheil purchased the eight-page Book of Esther from the Gutenberg Bible for $970,000 at Sotheby's in New York City, with the goal of preserving it as a whole rather than selling individual pages. He also purchased, on behalf of a client, a complete set of the Daniel Bomberg Babylonian Talmud for $9.3 million in 2015, the highest price ever paid for an item of Judaica at auction.

Loewentheil's personal collection includes some of the oldest surviving Hebrew Bible manuscript scrolls, including the earliest Torah scroll sheet of the Exodus story, the so-called "London Manuscript." The manuscript contains the text of Exodus 9:18–13:2 (the Seventh through Tenth plagues, the Passover, and the Exodus). Loewentheil loaned the manuscript to the Israel Museum in 2010, where it was exhibited at the Shrine of the Book alongside another section from the same Torah scroll, the Ashkar-Gilson Manuscript, containing the text of Exodus 13:19 to 15:27.

=== Photography ===
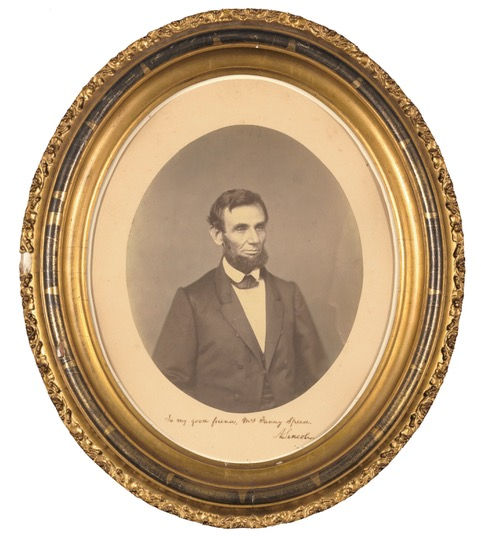
Abraham Lincoln. Salt Print Photograph Inscribed and Signed by Lincoln to Fanny Speed, wife of his closest friend, Joshua Speed, 1861. From the Stephan Loewentheil Photography Collection,19th Century Shop

Loewentheil's photography collection is rooted in early photographic methods of the 19th century – daguerreotypes, cartes de visite, albumen prints, tintypes, and cyanotypes. Much like his rare book collection, Loewentheil's photography collection has a historical theme, featuring rare portraits of some of the most notable Americans of the 19th century – John D. Rockefeller, Abraham Lincoln, Clara Barton, and John C. Calhoun, among many others.

Loewentheil has collected many images from the early American photographer Mathew Brady. Brady's whole-plate daguerreotype portrait of American politician and states-rights advocate John C. Calhoun, one of Loewentheil's most notable acquisitions, set a new record for the photographer upon its sale for $338,500 in a Sotheby's auction on April 6, 2011. The Calhoun portrait, along with a rare image of American Red Cross founder Clara Barton sitting with soldiers and a personal photograph album compiled by Mark Twain, were featured in the 2011 Cornell University Library exhibition Dawn's Early Light: The First 50 Years of American Photography. Another Brady photograph from the Loewentheil Collection, "Collected for Burial" – taken at the Battle of Antietam – was loaned to the Metropolitan Museum of Art for their 2014 traveling exhibition, Photography and the American Civil War, along with Brady's own studio camera.

== Historical photography of China Collection ==
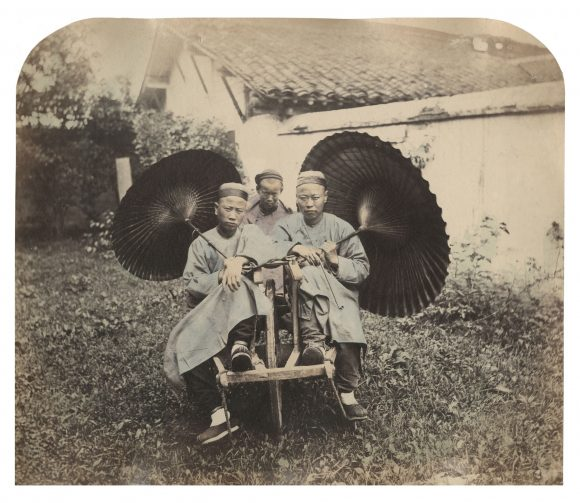
No. 47 in Sketches of Chinese Life and Character series, Shanghai, 1860s–1870s. Original hand-tinted albumen silver print. Photograph by William Saunders – The Stephan Loewentheil Historical Photography of China Collection.

Lowentheil owns the Stephan Loewentheil Historical Photography of China Collection, which has been described as invaluable window into nineteenth century Qing Dynasty China, before the upheavals of modernity would change the country and its people irrevocably. One highlight of the building of the collection over three decades was the acquisition of an album of 56 albumen prints by Felice Beato, which included some of the earliest photographic images of China, at an auction in Pennsylvania in 2014.

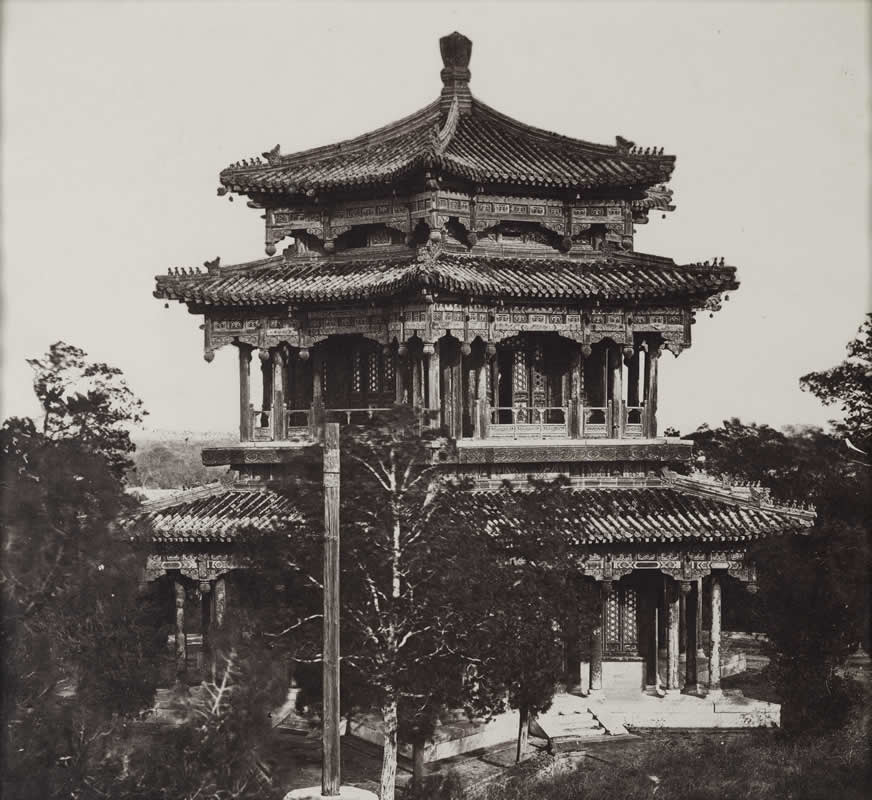
The Great Imperial Palace Before the Burning, Beijing, 1860. Photograph by Felice Beato – The Stephan Loewentheil Historical Photography of China Collection

The collection, numbering more than 21,000 photographs, includes work from both international and Chinese photographers, among them Italian-born Felice Beato; British expatriates Thomas Child and William Saunders; Scottish traveling photographer John Thomson; and native Chinese photographers Pun Lun, Lai Afong and Tung Hing, among many others.

The Stephan Loewentheil Historical Photography of China Collection has been exhibited both in the United States and abroad. The Collection's extensive holdings of early Peking photographs by Thomas Child were exhibited in November 2015 at the China Exchange in London, and in 2016 at the Sidney Mishkin Gallery at Baruch College in New York. Child, a British gas engineer sent to Peking to work for the Imperial Maritime Customs Service in 1870, brought his camera with him throughout his travels and created the most comprehensive photographic portrayal of 19th century Peking. A selection of 30 photographs from the Historical Photography of China Collection, including Felice Beato's rare portrait of the Old Summer Palace, taken just before its destruction in 1860, was displayed as part of Asia Week New York in March 2017.

Beginning in November 2018, 120 images from the Loewentheil China Photography Collection were shown in Beijing at the Tsinghua University Art Museum in the museum's first photography exhibition, Vision and Reflection: Photographs of China in the 19th Century from the Loewentheil Collection. The largest exhibition of 19th century photographs to be staged in China, Vision and Reflection attracted 70,000 viewers in its first two months. Su Dan, Vice Director of the museum, described the exhibit as "a must-see exhibition for scholars who are interested in literature, history, folklore and architecture. ... a grand feast of historical culture and artistic aesthetics." In an interview with CNN about the exhibition, Loewentheil expressed a similar sentiment: "photography is the greatest preserver of history ... because it was simultaneous with the technological revolutions that were to change everything." Loewentheil was also interviewed on China Global Television Network program "The Point with Liu Xin," where he discussed the exhibition as well as the past, present, and future of photography in China. Vision and Reflection: Photographs of China in the 19th Century from the Loewentheil Collection remained on display through March 31, 2019.

In 2022, the Loewentheil China Photography Collection launched Seizing Shadows: Rare Photographs by the Late Qing Dynasty Chinese Masters, a virtual exhibition featuring a selection of images from the vast collection.

Loewentheil has been published and quoted extensively on the subject of early Chinese photography.

== Discovery and recovery of lost and stolen books ==
Loewentheil has assisted in the recovery of stolen rare books and artifacts several times over the course of his career. In 1990, Loewentheil was involved in the discovery and return to the University of Pennsylvania of several stolen early editions of William Shakespeare's plays. A part-time employee of the Van Pelt Library had stolen nearly 120 rare books, including multiple quarto editions of Shakespeare plays, an incunable edition of Dante's Divine Comedy, a first edition of Thomas Paine's Common Sense, and many others. Loewentheil encountered the books at Bauman Rare Books in Philadelphia, where his suspicions were aroused that they might be stolen. After researching their provenance, he discovered that they were the property of the University of Pennsylvania, and contacted the FBI, leading to the thief's arrest and the return of the books to the Van Pelt Library.

In 2013 Loewentheil returned two rare books on early American exploration and travel that had been stolen from the National Library of Sweden in the 1990s. The theft was not uncovered until 2004, when a library patron requested to view a rare map of the Mississippi River that was discovered to be missing. Soon after, library employee Anders Burius was arrested in a case that made international headlines. Further investigations revealed that Burius had stolen dozens of books, including a 1651 first edition of Hobbes' Leviathan and a 1633 collection of John Donne sonnets, from the library between 1995 and 2004, although the recovery of these volumes was hindered by Burius's suicide five days after his arrest.

Years before the theft was discovered, Loewentheil unwittingly acquired two of the National Library of Sweden's stolen volumes – a 19th-century illustrated text of the Mississippi River and a 17th-century French book on the Louisiana Territory by Louis Hennepin, – in an auction at Ketterer Kunst in Germany before selling them to a client in 1998. Loewentheil did not become aware of their theft until fourteen years later, when a stolen copy of the 1597 Wytfliet Atlas – the earliest printed atlas of the Americas – was offered for sale in New York City, prompting the Royal Library to finally release a list of missing books. Loewentheil immediately set to work tracking down the books to purchase them back himself and donate them to the Royal Library, which he accomplished in 2013.

Some of the returns of stolen books and artifacts Mr. Loewentheil has negotiated have gone unacknowledged, since the victimized institutions declined to report the theft publicly.

Loewentheil has been active in condemning theft and fraud in the rare book industry, and has been a featured speaker in conferences (including "The Written Heritage of Mankind in Peril" at the British Library in 2015) and articles on the subject.

== Organic and kosher farming ==
Loewentheil owns and operates an organic farm in the Catskills Region of Upstate New York. There he grows organic produce and fruit and breeds and raises cattle, sheep, turkeys, and chickens.

The animals are kosher processed with the help of a shochet. The farm was borne out of Loewentheil's desire to serve food to his family and friends that he was "personally responsible for" and to carry on the increasingly threatened traditions of shechita.

Loewentheil's farm reflects his belief in the necessity of taking accountability for our food in a world dominated by agribusiness. This is consistent with the Eco-Kosher Movement, a growing farm philosophy that seeks to merge traditional Jewish dietary laws with modern socio-environmental concerns in an attempt to promote sustainable farming and the highest quality meat.

== Philanthropy ==
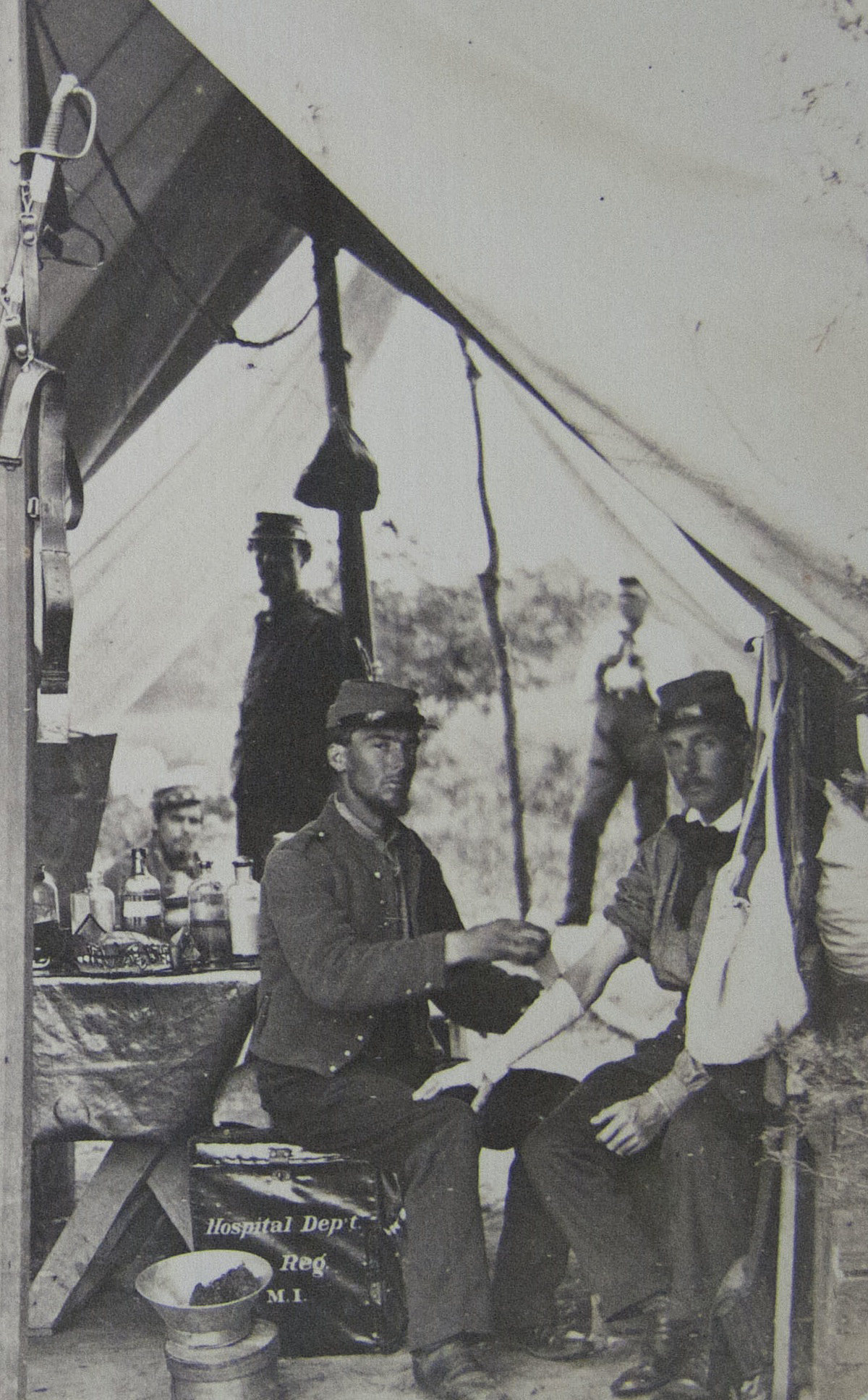
From the Civil War photographic album of Louis Philippe d'Orleans Comte de Paris. ca. 1862 – The Stephan Loewentheil Family Photography Collection, Cornell University

Loewentheil has maintained a close relationship with his alma mater, Cornell University, and, through multiple donations, has established the Beth and Stephan Loewentheil Family Photography Collection, the centerpiece of the Cornell University Library's collection of fine-art photography. The Loewentheil Collection, which numbers over 16,000 images, "includes 19th- and 20th century photographs organized in several major groups: Daguerre ephemera and early photographic processes, African-American collection, Mathew Brady and the Civil War, Lincoln, Native Americans and the West, hand-colored photography, and cartes de visite." In 2014, Loewentheil donated a rare Civil War-era photograph album, containing 265 photographs from noted Civil War photographer Mathew Brady and others, to the Cornell University Library, where it was celebrated as the library's eight millionth volume.

Photographs from the Collection have been featured in the Cornell University exhibitions Dawn's Early Light: The First 50 Years of American Photography and The Lincoln Presidency: The Last Full Measure of Devotion. On the occasion of the retirement of Carl A. Kroch University Librarian Anne Kenney after 30 years at Cornell University Library, Mr. Loewentheil donated a unique photograph of Abraham Lincoln by Alexander Gardner to the library in Kenney's honor.

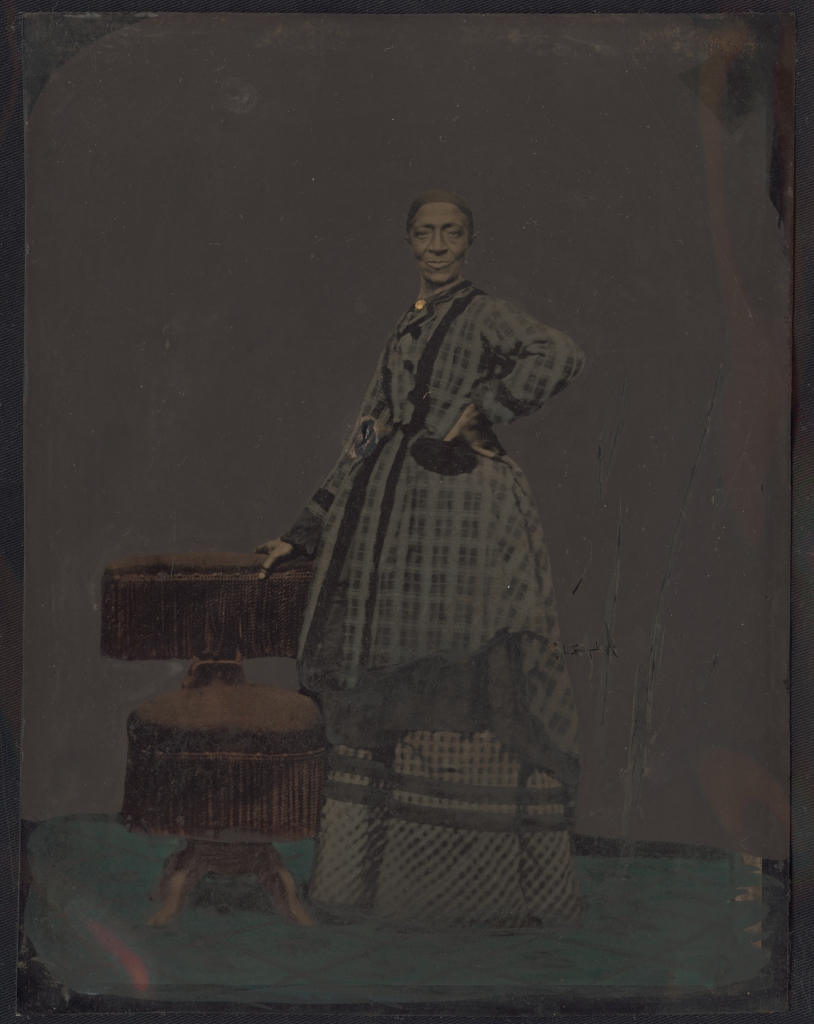
Hand-painted tintype of an African-American woman; verso reads "Marguerite, a former slave." ca. 1880 – The Stephan Loewentheil Family Photography Collection, Cornell University

In 2012, Loewentheil established The Loewentheil Collection of African-American Photographs: a group of 645 photographs depicting African-American life from 1860 to the 1960s, to be housed at Cornell University Library. The collection – which focuses on images of everyday African-American life and includes cartes de visite, stereoviews, hand-painted tintypes, cyanotypes, and daguerreotypes – was fully digitized in February 2017 and is available to view in its entirety on the library's website.

Loewentheil is a member of the Board of Trustees for his undergraduate alma mater, Washington & Jefferson College.

Loewentheil has been a supporter of the New York Public Library, and of the Library's annual Young Lions Fiction Award for over a decade. Since its inception in 2001, the award, given each spring to an author under the age of 35 of a novel or collection of short stories, has honored such luminary young writers as Molly Antopol, Karen Russell, Jonathan Safran Foer, and Uzodinma Iweala. Fellow donors to the award's endowment include Ethan Hawke, Russell Abrams, and Rick Moody.

== Personal life ==
Loewentheil has three adult children and, as of 2019, is unmarried. His oldest son, Nate, found and co-manages Commonweal Ventures, a venture capital firm focused on sustainability development; Nate previously worked as a special assistant to President Barack Obama and ran in the 2018 elections for the Maryland House of Delegates. Loewentheil's daughter Kara earned a J.D. from Harvard Law School and previously worked in reproductive rights litigation. Kara has since moved on to become a Masters-certified Life Coach and creator of the feminist podcast UnF*ck Your Brain, which has ranked #13 in Apple Health and Fitness podcasts and also been included on "best of" lists including Glamour, Refinery29, and The New York Times. His youngest son, Jacob, is an author, antiquarian, and rare photography dealer at 19th Century Rare Book and Photograph Shop; Jacob is also the curator of the Marcel Sternberger Collection.
