= Photography in China =

Photography in China (in Chinese 攝影 shè yǐng, literally ‘capturing images’, although other appellations exist) dates back to the mid-19th century with the arrival of European photographers in Macao. In the 1850s, western photographers set up studios in the coastal port cities, but soon their Chinese assistants and local competition spread to all regions.

By the end of the 19th century, all major cities had photographic studios where middle-class Chinese could have portraits taken for family occasions. Western and Chinese photographers documented ordinary street life, major wars, and prominent figures. Affluent Chinese adopted photography as a hobby; Empress Dowager Cixi had her portrait taken repeatedly. In the 20th century, photography in China—as in other countries around the world—was used for recreation, record keeping, newspaper and magazine journalism, political propaganda, and fine-art photography.

== Overview ==
According to the scholar Meccarelli, Chinese photography is the result of several factors. These include the study of optics (invention of camera obscura), the development of modern chemistry (photosensitive substances), the diffusion and settlement of Western medicine (especially anatomy), the presence of Westerners and missionaries (know-how and use of the photographic tool) Photographers were interested not only in recording what they saw, but also in using new techniques to express traditional aesthetics and poetics.

== History ==
=== 1842–1890: Pioneers ===
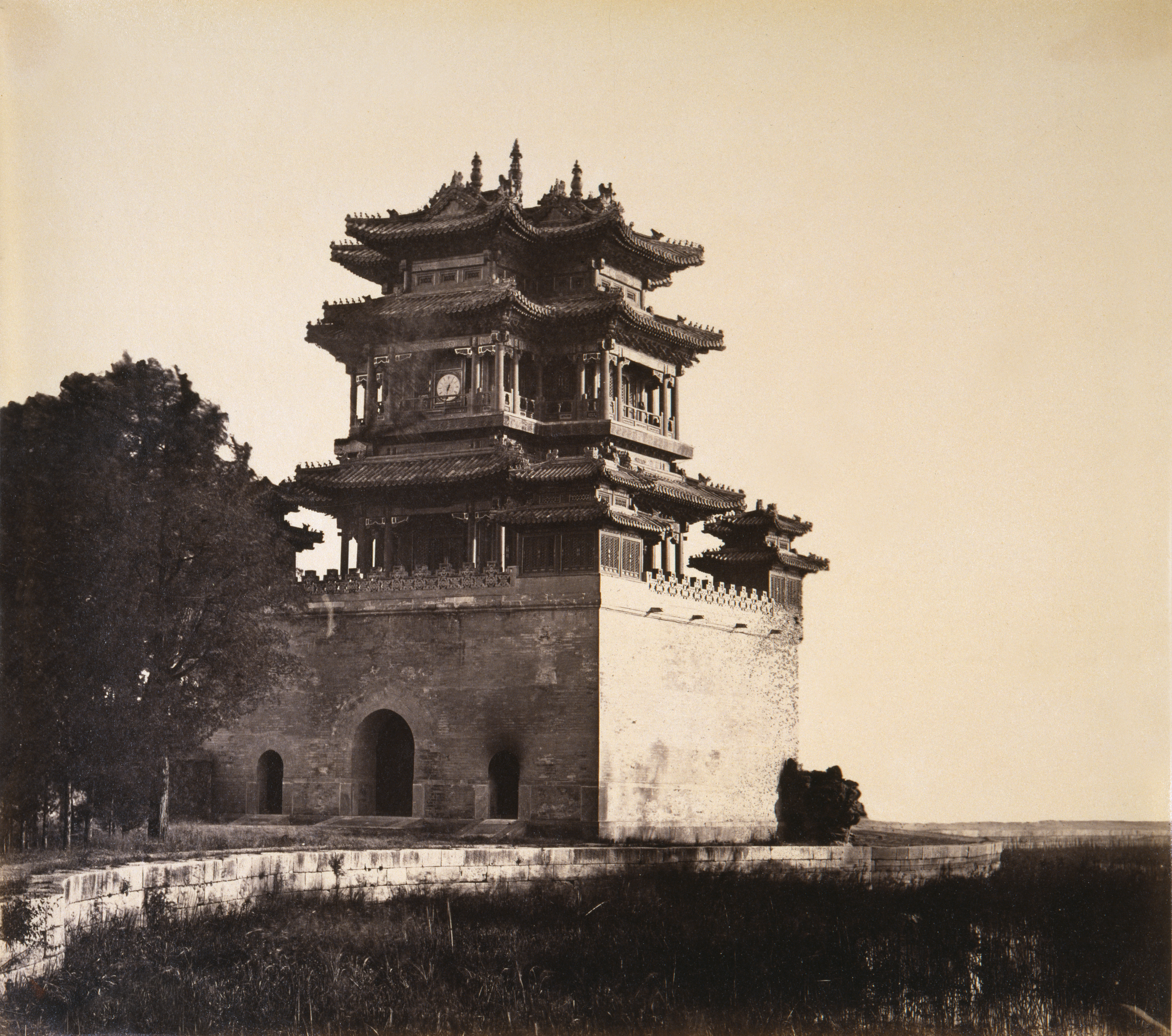
Wenchang Pavilion (文昌阁) of the Summer Palace (Yihe Yuan) Photograph by Felice Beato, October 1860.

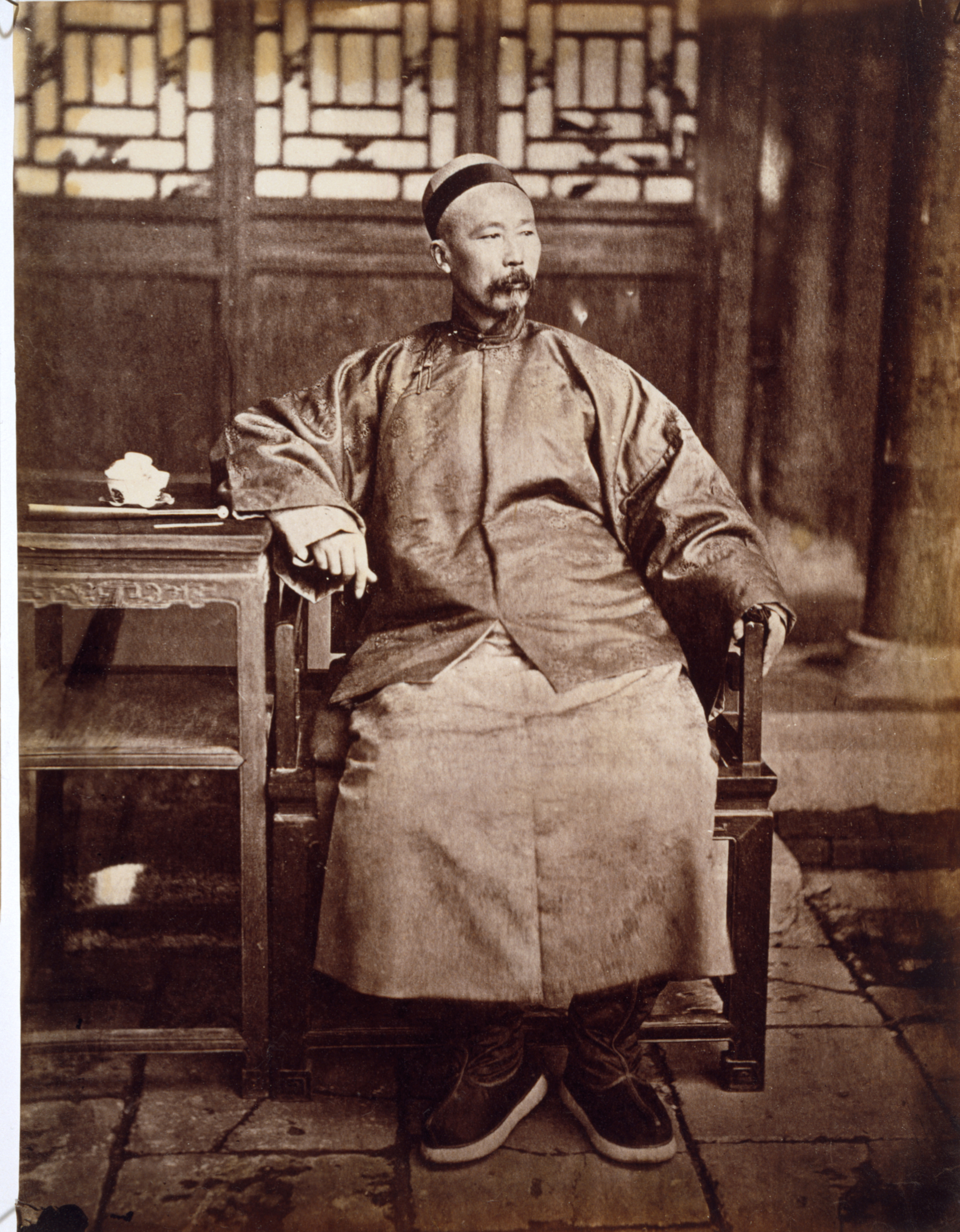
Li Hongzhang, 1871

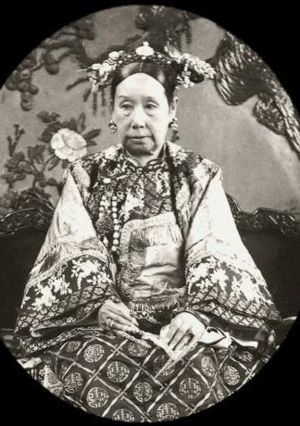
Empress Dowager Ci Xi

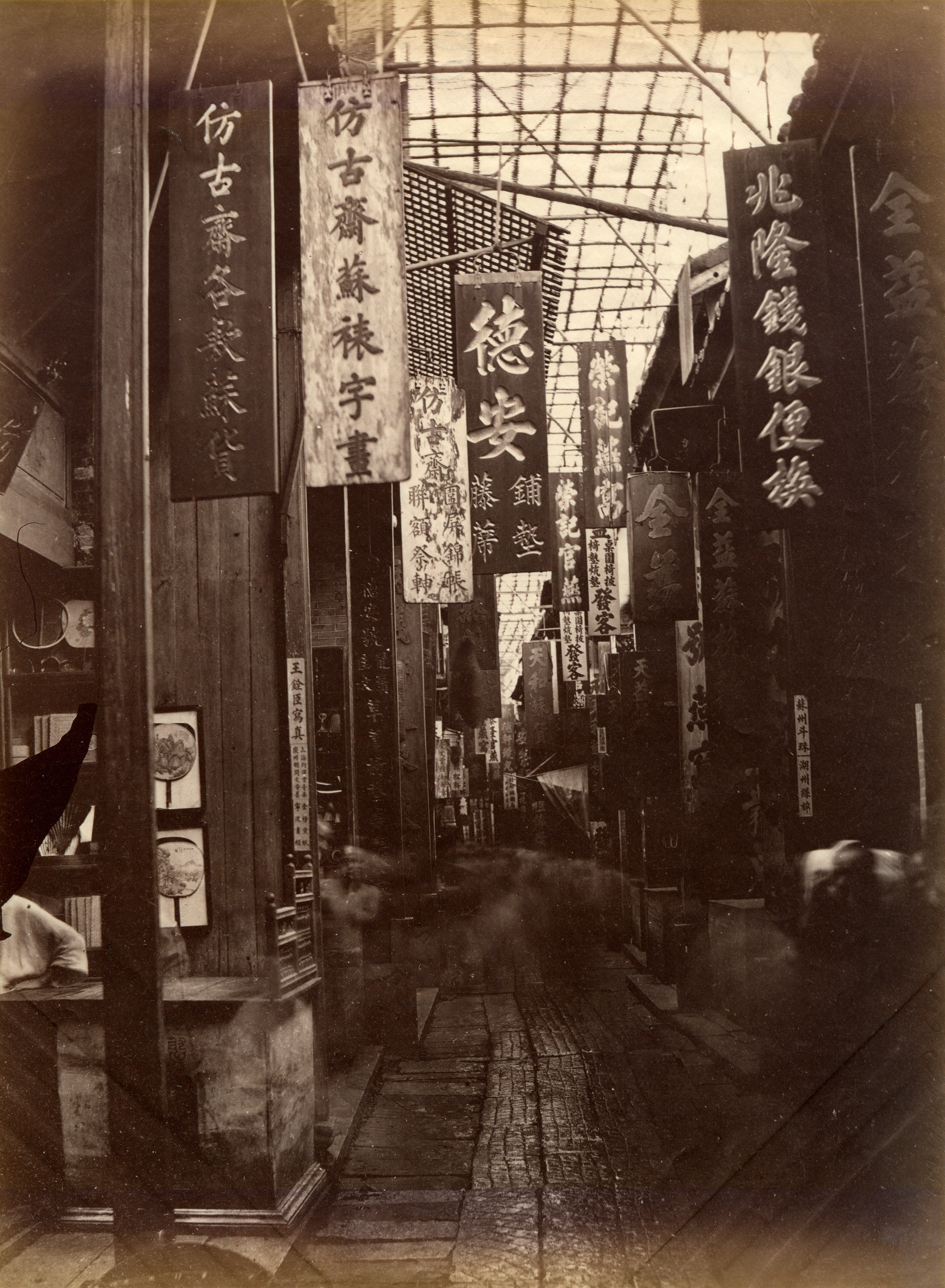
Street view of Guangzhou 1860

Some of the very early photographers in China include Dr Richard Woosnam, Major George Malcolm, Henry Collen, Jules Itier and Zou Boqi.

In the second half of the 19th century, some Chinese photo studios were established, such as Kung Tai (公泰照相樓) and Sze Yuen Ming (上洋耀華照相) in Shanghai, and Pun Lun (繽綸) and Lai Afong (赖阿芳) in Hong Kong. Major contributions in this would come from George R. West and Hugh Mackay.

Several pioneers of photography in China include Felice Beato (British, 1832–1909), John Thomson (British, 1837–1921) and Afong Lai (Chinese, 1839–1900).

=== Early 20th century ===
Photographers of the early 20th century include the poet and scholar Liu Bannong (1891–1934, 劉半農) and Zhang Yin Quan (1900–1971, 張印泉). Photographers of this period sometimes branched into filmmaking such as Ho Fan (1937–2016, 何藩), and China's first steps into photojournalism done by Lang Jingshan (1892–1995). Foreign and Chinese missionaries used photography intensively, both to record their activity for the home base and to show their Chinese congregations.

Shortly before the fall of the dynasty, the Empress Dowager Ci Xi turned to photography and had a series of photographs taken to show her imperial aura .

During the wars and instability of the Warlord Era, photographers like Gao Fan (1922–2004) ventured into wartime photography, as did Niu Weiyu (1922–), who would also take many photographs for the Chinese Communist Party leaders. The (Second Sino-Japanese War, 1937–1945) would be much covered by Sha Fei (1912–1948).

=== Early Communist rule: 1949–1965 ===
In the early years of the People's Republic, the state organized artists and writers into official groups that directed their work and provided them with steady salaries. Accordingly, many were assigned to photographers of Mao and high Party members. Among these were Hou Bo, Lu Houmin, and Xu Xiaobing.

=== Cultural Revolution: 1966–1976 ===
Photography in China was seen as a Socialist Realist propagandist tool. Li Zhensheng was one of the few photographers who managed to take pictures in an honest way during the Cultural Revolution. Subjects of his Cultural Revolution photographs included "negative" scenes such public humiliation, street violence, executions, etc., as well as "positive" moments, like people studying Mao's works, singing revolutionary slogans, performing loyalty dance, and participating in farm work, etc. Li's photographs of the Cultural Revolution are published in a book titled Red-Color News Soldier by Phaidon.

=== Modern: 1976–1993 ===
The April Fifth Movement in 1976 marked the start of a new photographic vision in China. During the movement, ordinary citizens (amateur photographers) picked up the cameras and documented people's public mourning for Chinese Premier Zhou Enlai in Tiananmen Square in Beijing. A couple of years later, some of these photographs were published in a book called "People's Mourning". Many of these amateur photographers became professional ones and joined the official press. They also found an unofficial photo club called "April Photo Society."

The aftermath of the Cultural Revolution led to a documentary photography movement that rapidly grew in strength. Many photojournalists worked for the state, and therefore they do not own their copyright in their work.

=== Contemporary: 1993–present ===
The establishment in 1993 of the East Village area of the capital Beijing, established an artistic coterie that used photography as an adjunct to experimental performance art and conceptual art. In 1994, Rong Rong co-founded the first Chinese conceptual art photography magazine, New Photo.

Many artist-photographers have had success, especially in the west. Although their work has not been as explicitly political as that by very similar conceptual artists in the west, it has used the same repertoire of 'shock'; nakedness, swear words, dead babies and elephant dung, among other items that have now become tired clichés. Some photographers also work in 'Chinese kitsch' – sometimes called "Mao goes Pop" – a collage style very similar to western pop art of the 1960s. Presently, we are reminded of the discursive autonomy contemporary Chinese art is increasingly afforded, seen in works by artists such as Xu Zhen, Xing Danwen, and Zhang Yue – artists who can not be easily summarized under the umbrella of a single artistic praxis such as "kitsch" or "pop" or "shock."

== Chinese magazines for photography ==
- Chinese Photography (中國攝影, Peking) publishing as of 1957
- Popular Photography (大众攝影 (大衆攝影), Peking) publishing as of 1958

== See also ==
- Felice Beato
- Henri Cartier-Bresson
- Robert Capa
- China Lucky Film
- Auguste François
- Hakuyō Fuchikami
- Greg Girard
- Tadahiko Hayashi
- Joris Ivens
- Hou Bo
- Li Zhensheng
- Liang Shitai
- Liu Xucang
- Lu Guang
- Ma Liuming
- Hedda Morrison
- Mu Qing
- Ou Ning
- Wang Qingsong
- Qiu Zhijie
- Eva Sandberg
- Marc Riboud
- Pierre Rossier
- William Saunders (photographer)
- John Thomson (photographer)
- Xia Xiao Wan
- Xu Xiaobing
- Yip Cheong Fun
- Zheng Guogu
- Zhang Ou
- Zhou Chengzhou

== References and further reading ==
- Rosenblum, Naomi (1997). A World History Of Photography (3 ed.). New York; London: Abbeville Press. Internet Archive. ISBN 0-7892-0028-7.
- Bennett, Terry (2009). History of Photography in China 1842–1860. Bernard Quaritch. ISBN 978-0956301208.
- Bennett, Terry (2013). History of photography in China : Chinese photographers, 1844–1879. London: Quaritch. ISBN 978-0956301246.
- Bennett, Terry (2010). History of Photography in China : Western Photographers, 1861-1879. London: Quaritch. ISBN 978-0956301215.
- Chen, Shi (2009). Early Chinese Photographers from 1840 to 1870: Innovation and Adaptation in the Development of Chinese Photography (PDF) (Master of Arts thesis). University of Florida.
- Cody, Jeffrey W.; Terpak, Frances (2011). Brush & shutter: early photography in China. Los Angeles: Getty Research Institute. ISBN 978-1-60606-054-4.
- Ho, Joseph W. (2022). Developing Mission: Photography, Filmmaking, and American Missionaries in Modern China. Cornell University Press..
- Kent, Richard K. (2013). "Early Twentieth-Century Art Photography in China: Adopting, Domesticating, and Embracing the Foreign". Local Culture/Global Photography. 3 (2). hdl:2027/spo.7977573.0003.204.
- Meccarelli, Marco; Foo, Yee Wah; Flamminii, Antonella (December 2013). "China and the West in the Art of the Nineteenth Century: A Cultural and Historical Review of the Relations between Painting and Photography". Ming Qing Studies. Aracne. pp. 117–160. ISBN 978-88-548-6635-5.
- Meccarelli, Marco (2015). "New Perspectives about the Origins of Chinese Photography and Western Research in China". In Fedi, P.; Paolillo, Marco. (eds.). ARTE DAL MEDITERRANEO AL MAR DELLA CINA Genesi ed incontri di scuole e stili. Scritti in onore di Paola Mortari Vergara Caffarelli. Palermo: Officina di Studi Medievali. pp. 587–598.
- Roberts, Claire (2012). Photography and China (Exposures). Durrington, UK: Reaktion Books. ISBN 978-1861899118.
- Wu, Shengqing (2020). Photo Poetics: Chinese Lyricism and Modern Media Culture. New York: Columbia University Press. ISBN 9780231192200.
