= Dutton & Michaels =

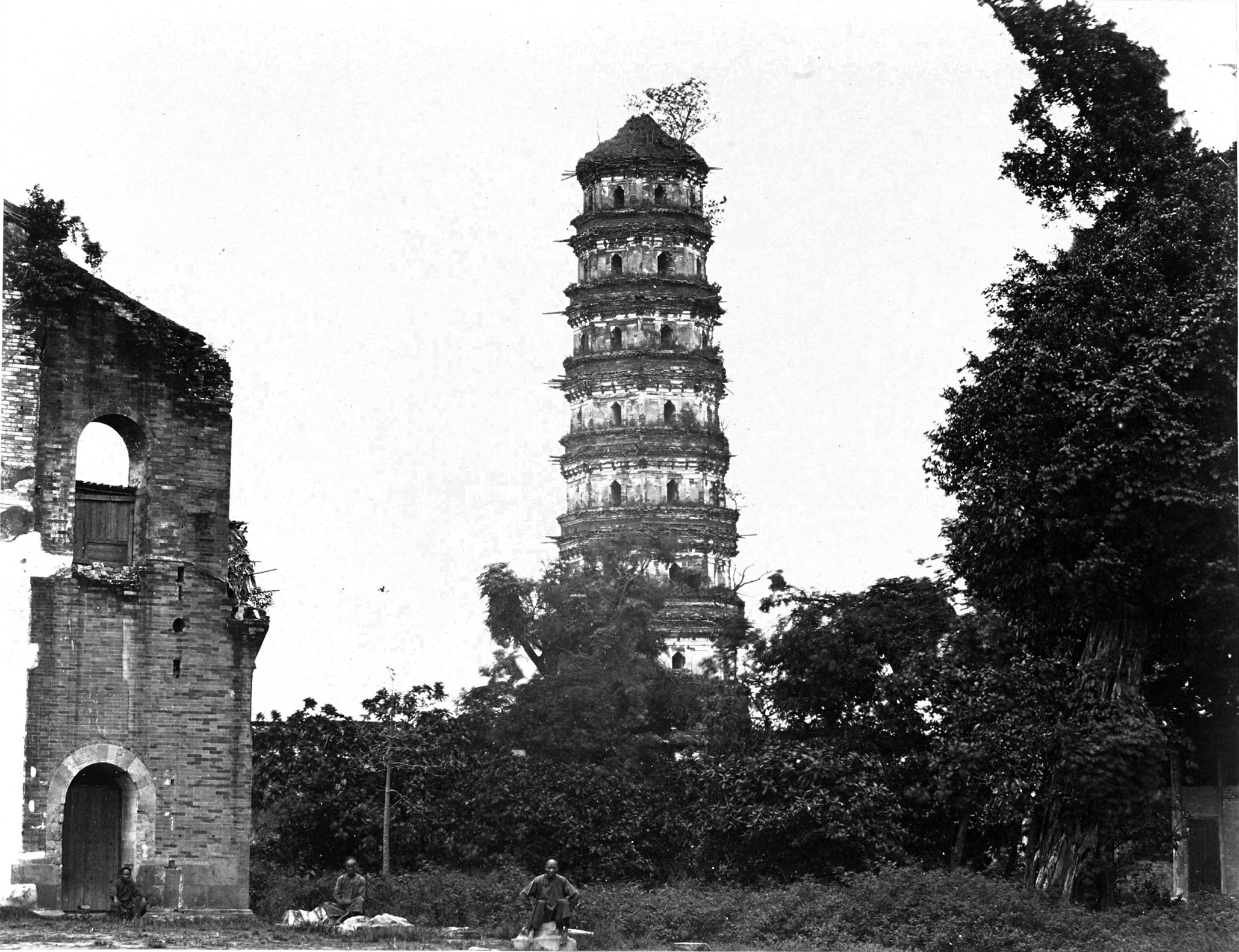
View of the ruins of the Flowery Pagoda [Hua Ta], Liurong Si (also known as Six Banyans Temple), Canton (now Guangzhou), China. Albumen print by Dutton & Michaels, negative exposed 1863.

The Dutton & Michaels photographic studio was a photography partnership between Sylvester Dutton, an American from Maine, and someone named Michaels (possibly Vince Michaels), which was based in Canton (now Guangzhou), China, in the mid-1860s.
