= William Saunders (photographer) =

British-born photographer

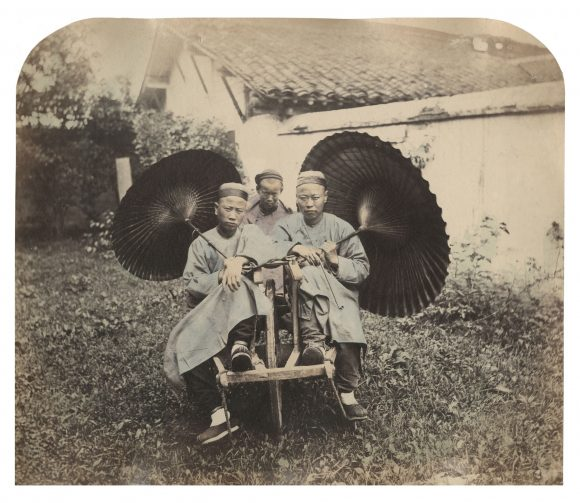
William Saunders, Hand Carriage, c. 1865. Hand-coloured albumen silver print. Source: the Stephan Loewentheil China Photography Collection

William Thomas Saunders (1832–1892) was a British-born photographer who settled in China and became the leading photographer in Shanghai during the late Qing dynasty. He was the first photographer known to produce hand-coloured photographs in China.

== Life and career ==
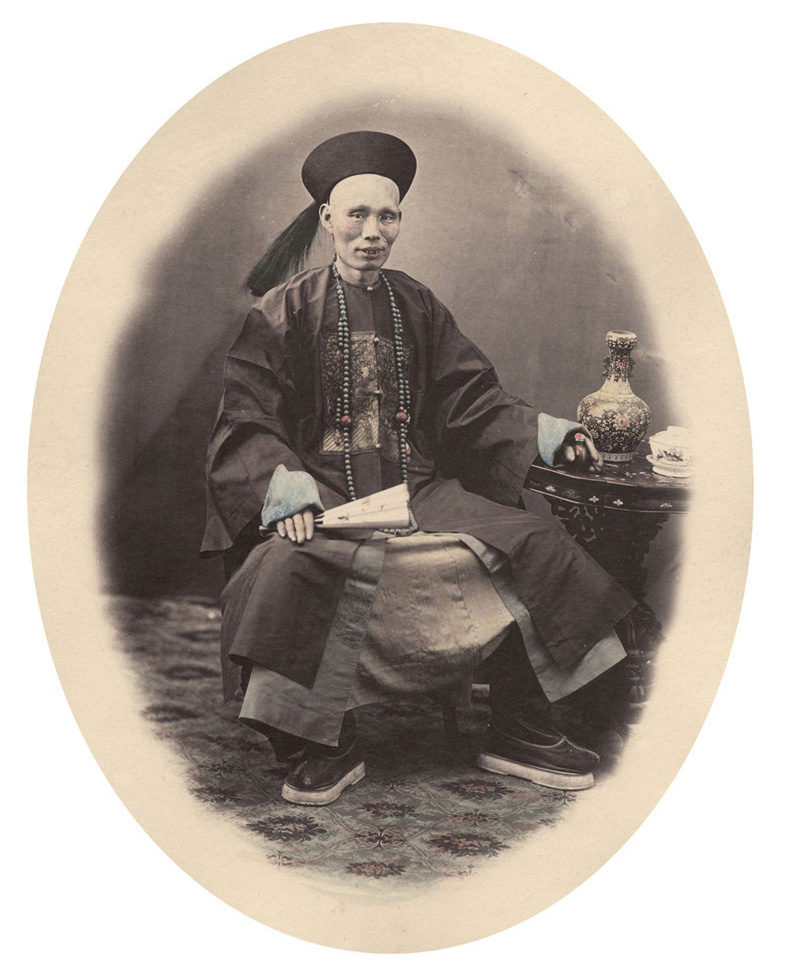
William Saunders. Qing Dynasty Official. c. 1865. Hand-coloured albumen silver print. Source: the Stephan Loewentheil China Photography Collection

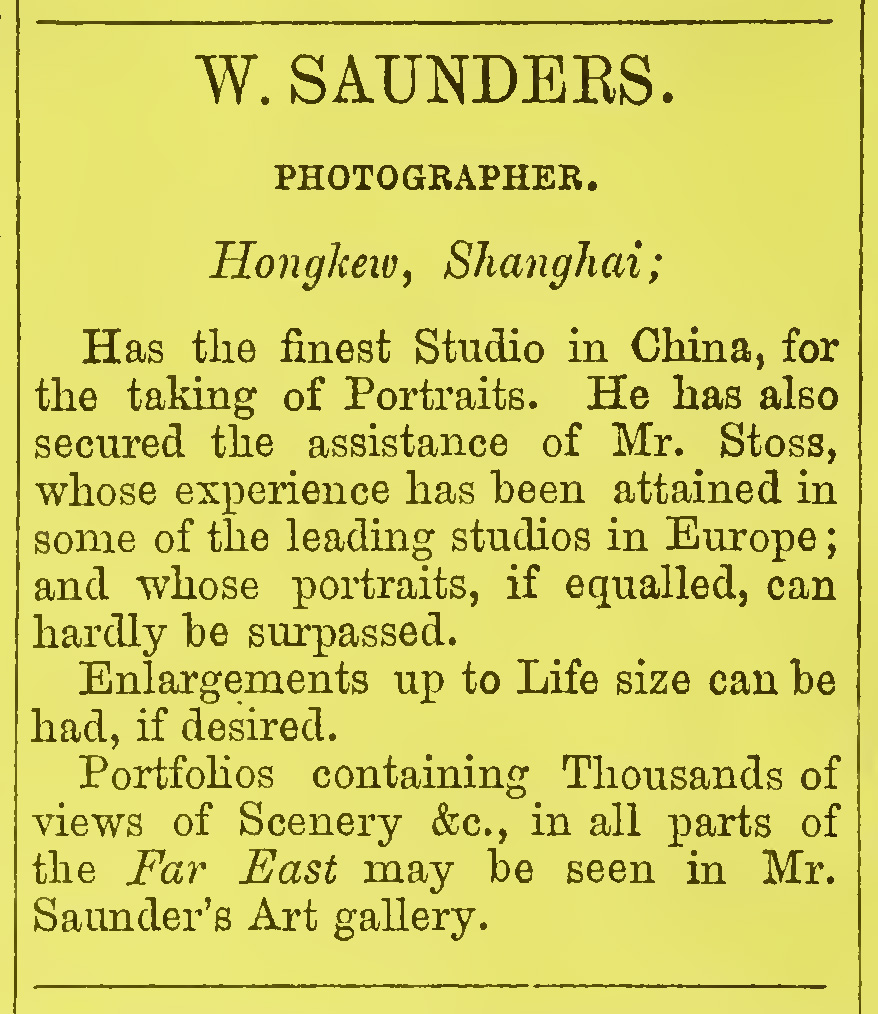
Advertisement for “Mr. Saunders' Art gallery." The Far East Journal (Shanghai) Vol. 2, No. 3. 1877

Saunders was born in Britain in 1832, and first travelled to China in 1860 as an engineer. He then returned to Britain, studied photography, and returned again to China with photographic equipment, where he opened one of Shanghai's first photography studios in January 1862. Located near the famous Astor House Hotel at the centre of Shanghai's commercial hub, Saunders' studio became the city's leading photographic studio. Saunders' studio was to remain open for twenty-five years, a testament to his "considerable photographic talent [combined] with business acumen and marketing flair." Although chiefly a portrait photographer, Saunders' fascination with China led him to photograph current events, local scenery and the local population.

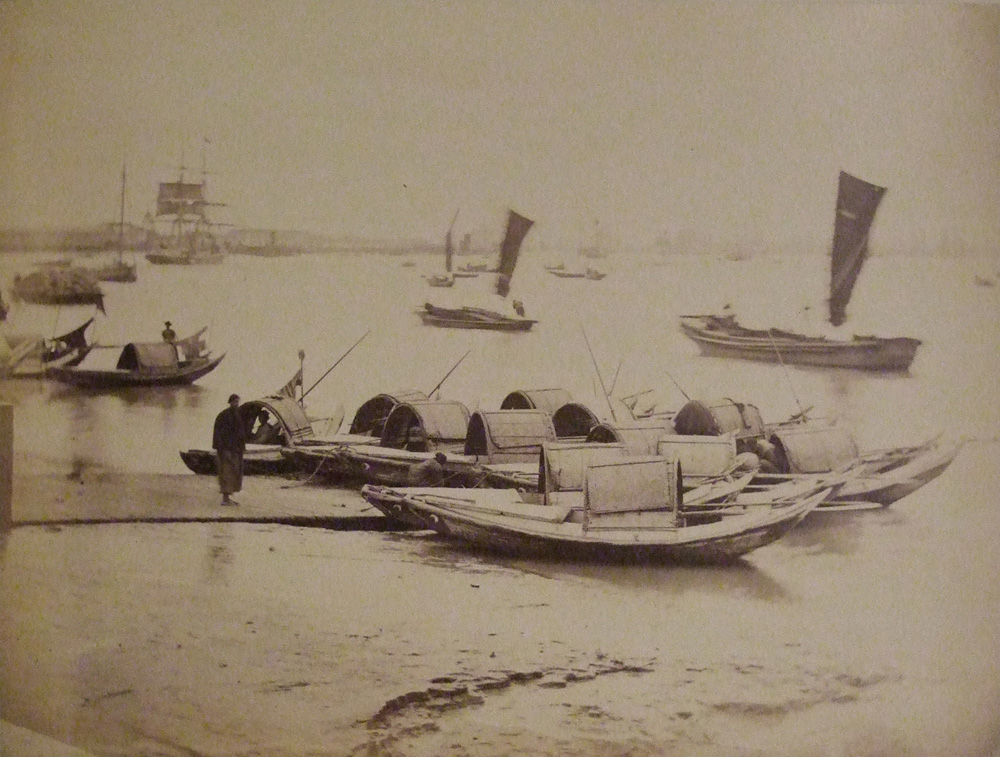
William Saunders. Waterfront in Shanghai. c. 1865. Albumen silver print. Source: the Stephan Loewentheil China Photography Collection

Saunders created his photographs – some of the earliest of the city and its people – "at a critical time in Chinese history; just as Shanghai was emerging as an international commercial city." Saunders' photographs offer an intimate view of the diverse inhabitants of Shanghai and their traditional lifestyles and occupations. His studio portraits often featured props that signified the trade or social status of the subject, and the photographer exhibited particular interest in the clothing and hairstyles of the subjects. Although many of Saunders' scenes of everyday Chinese life were posed due to limitations of photographic processes, they provide accurate reflections of life in 19th-century China, and contributed to the spreading of knowledge of Chinese customs and traditions throughout the West.

Saunders retired to England in the late 1880s, but continued to travel to China regularly. On a return trip to Shanghai, he became unwell during the passage; his health continued to deteriorate upon arrival, and Saunders died in December 1892 of bronchitis at the age of sixty.

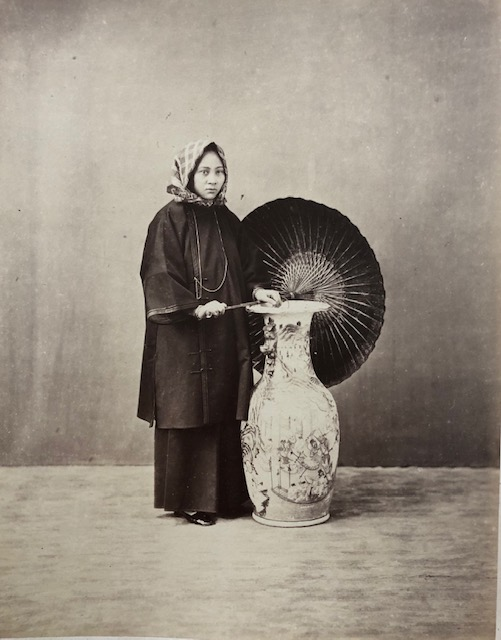
William Saunders. Portrait of a Woman from Guangzhou. c. 1865. Albumen silver print. Source: the Stephan Loewentheil China Photography Collection

== Publications ==
Saunders' success was built upon the production of photographic albums of Chinese landscapes and genre studies. A selection of William Saunders' photographs was published in an early series of 50 prints published before 1871 as a Portfolio of Sketches of Chinese Life and Character. While all other extant copies of this portfolio contain 50 images, a unique copy of the portfolio containing more than 70 photographs was acquired in Sweden by collector Stephan Loewentheil. Saunders contributed regularly to publications such as the Far East and the Illustrated London News. He also photographed local ports in China and Japan, including Yokohama where he settled for three months in August 1862 and assembled a portfolio of approximately 90 images during his time there.

Photographs from Saunders' series were reproduced and distributed throughout the world in illustrated journals and books until well into the 20th century.

== Legacy ==
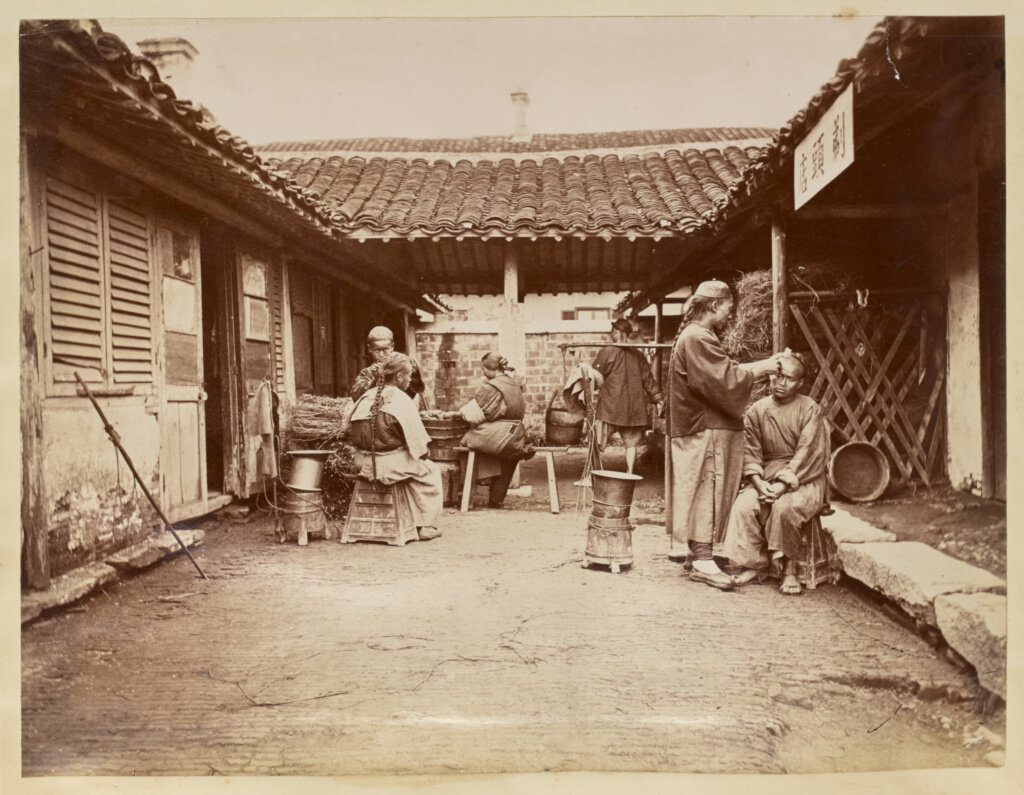
William Saunders. Itinerant Barbers. c. 1865. Albumen silver print. Source: http://photographyofchina.com/blog/william-saunders

In October 2016, the China Exchange in London presented Qing Dynasty Shanghai: The Photographs of William Saunders, the first exhibition dedicated solely to Saunders' work. The exhibition displayed nearly 40 hand-coloured albumen prints on loan from the Stephan Loewentheil China Photography Collection, "the largest private holding of late Qing dynasty photographs".

Saunders photographs from the Stephan Loewentheil China Photography Collection were also displayed as part of the mammoth exhibition Vision and Reflection: Photographs of China in the 19th Century from the Loewentheil Collection, held at the Tsinghua University Art Museum in Beijing in 2019. The exhibition displayed 120 "masterpieces" of 19th-century photography of China, including 10 hand-coloured albumen prints by Saunders.

== Chinese language sources ==
- 洛文希尔中国摄影收藏
- 清华大学艺术博物馆、洛文希尔收藏编.世相与映像——洛文希尔摄影收藏中的19世纪中国[C].北京：清华大学出版社，2018.
- [英]泰瑞·贝内特.中国摄影史：西方摄影师1861-1879[M].徐婷婷译.北京：中国摄影出版社，2013.
- 中国日报网.别创一格的上海老照片赴伦敦参展[N/OL].中新网，2016-08-10
