= Xia Xiao Wan =

Chinese artist

Xia Xiaowan (simplified Chinese: 夏小万; traditional Chinese: 夏小萬; pinyin: Xià Xiǎowàn) (born 1959 in Beijing, China) is a painter.

== Biography ==
In 1982, Xia graduated from the Third Studio of Oil Painting Department of the Central Academy of Fine Arts. The following year, he became Art Editor for China Machinery Publishing, leaving in 1984.

Xia currently lives in Beijing, working as a professor in the stagecraft department of the Central Academy of Drama. He is also a member of the China Oil Painting Institute, Beijing Artists Association and Beijing Arts of Oil Painting Commission.

== Exhibitions ==
- 2012 "Xia Xiaowan Solo Exhibition", Museum of Contemporary Arts, MoCA, Singapore
- 2006 "Hyper Design – the 6th Shanghai Biennale", Shanghai Art Museum, Shanghai, China
- 2006 "2006 New York Asia Art Fair", New York, USA
- 2006 "The 2nd Biennale of Austria 2006", Klagenfurt, Austria
- 2006 "Mahjong – Chinesische Gegenwartskunst aus der Sammlung Sigg", Hamburger Kunsthalle, Hamburg, Germany
- 2005 "Mahjong – Chinesische Gegenwartskunst aus der Sammlung Sigg", Kunstmuseum
- 2005 Bern, Bern, Switzerland
- 2005 "Yellow River – A Review of New Chinese Oil Painting", National Museum of China, Beijing, China
- 2005 "Hand in Hand with the New Century – The Third Exhibition of Chinese Oil Painting", National Museum of China, Beijing, China
- 2005 "2005 – Pingyao International Photography Art Exhibition", Pingyao, China
- 2004 "Posers – Group Exhibition of Courtyard Gallery Artists, Courtyard Gallery, Beijing China
- 2004 "2004 Asia contemporary Art Exhibition", Gwangju, Korea
- 2004 Art of Xiaxiaowan, Time Gallery, Qingdao, China (solo)
- 2003 "How do you see with your mind & body? Xia Xiaowan's works on paper", Today Art Gallery, Beijing, China (solo)
- 2003 "The International Sketch Art", China, England, Australia
- 2002 "Vigor of the Century – Contemporary Art of Chinese 50 Artists", China Millennium Monument, Beijing, China

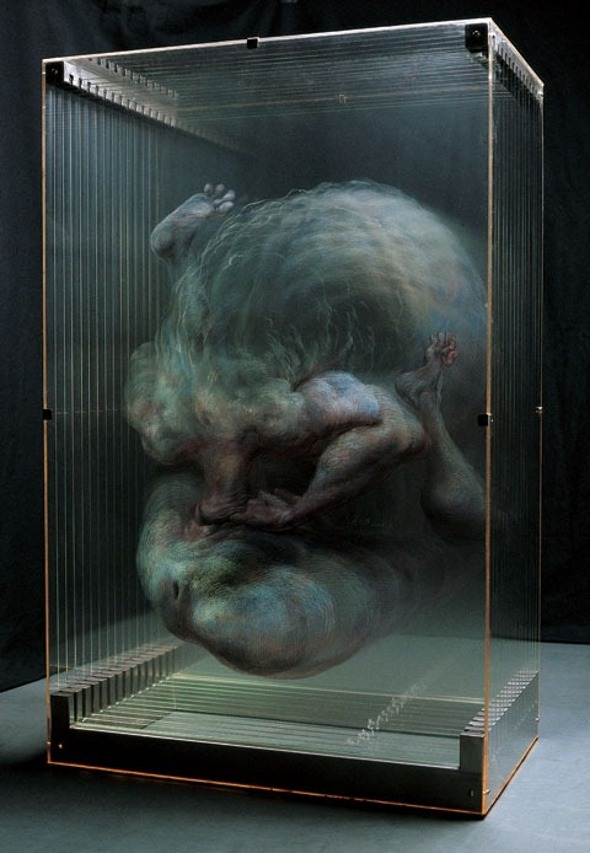
Work from 2002

- 2001 "Anxiety: the drawn figure", The University of New South Wales College of Fine Arts, New South Wales, Australia
- 2001 Chengdu Biennale, Chengdu, China
- 2000 "20th Century Chinese Oil Painting Exhibition", National Museum of Art, Beijing, China
- 1998 The MEDIAWAVE FESTIVAL, Hungary.
- 1998 "Looking Up", SCHOENI Gallery, Hong Kong, China (solo)
- 1996 The Repetition of Beginning, China
- 1996 Chinese Oil Painting Annual Exhibition, Beijing Museum of Art, China
- 1996 "Group Exhibition in Düsseldorf", Düsseldorf, Germany
- 1995 The April Exhibition, the Gallery of the Central Academy of Fine Arts, China
- 1994 "The Annual Exhibition of Works of the artists Nominated by Art Critics", Beijing Museum of Art, Beijing, China.
- 1991 "'91 March Exhibition", the Central Academy of Fine Arts, Beijing, China.
- 1991 "Chinese New Art Post 1989", Hong Kong Arts Center, Hong Kong. Marlborough Gallery, England and Australia
- 1989 "Modern Art from China", Beijing Museum of Art, Beijing, China
- 1988 "An exhibition of modern Chinese Art", National Museum of China, Beijing, China
- 1987 "Towards the Future", Beijing Museum of Art, China
- 1985 "The November Exhibition", the Palace Museum, Beijing, China
