= List of Chinese photographers =

This is a list of Chinese photographers.

- Cang Xin
- Chen Jiagang
- Chen Man
- Chen Wei
- Hong Cheong
- Feng Xuemin
- Fu Bingchang
- He Chengyao
- Hou Bo
- Lai Afong
- Lang Jingshan
- Li Zhensheng
- Liu Xucang
- Lu Guang
- Lu Houmin
- Luo Yang
- Feng Li
- Ma Liuming
- Miao Xiaochun
- Mu Qing
- O Zhang
- Ren Hang
- Sam Tata
- Sha Fei
- Shao Hua
- Shen Wei
- Stephen Chow
- Yijun Liao
- Sun-chang Lo
- Tchan Fou-li
- Tong Cheong
- Wang Fuchun (1943–2021) – Chinese People on the Train, Black Land and Manchurian Tiger
- Wang Qingsong
- Wu Shanzhuan
- Xu Xiaobing
- Yang Fudong
- John Yu Shuinling
- Zhao Xiaoding
- Zhang Jingna
- Zheng Guogu
- Zhuang Xueben
- Zhou Chengzhou

== See also ==
- List of Chinese women photographers
- List of Chinese artists
