= Sam Tata =

Chinese photographer

- Born: September 30, 1911; Shanghai, China
- Died: July 3, 2005 (aged 93); Sooke, British Columbia, Canada
- Occupation: Photographer
- Awards: Lifetime Achievement Award, Canadian Association of Professional Image Creators (CAPIC), 1990

Samuel Bejan Tata RCA (September 30, 1911 – July 3, 2005) was a Chinese photographer and photojournalist of Parsi descent. Tata grew up in Shanghai, where he learned the basics of photography from several mentors, including Lang Jingshan and Liu Xucang. Due to political unrest, he mostly confined himself in his early career to portraiture in the tradition of pictorialism.

In 1946, he moved to India for two years, where he took up photography full-time. A friendship begun in Bombay with the French photographer Henri Cartier-Bresson transformed his approach, emphasising street photography and a more natural style in his portraits. Tata returned to Shanghai and photographed for some months, accompanied by Cartier-Bresson during the occupation of the city by the new Communist regime. Starting in the 1950s, Tata engaged in assignments for prominent magazines such as National Geographic. Via Hong Kong and India, Tata emigrated to Montreal in 1956, where he created documentary stills for the National Film Board and continued photography for various publications. He became known for his portraits of Canadian artists and authors. Tata's work has been the subject of books and touring exhibitions. His photographs are found in several institutions, including the National Gallery of Canada.

== Early life ==
Samuel Bejan Tata was born to a mercantile Parsi family in Shanghai, China, on September 30, 1911. He went to Shanghai Public School, then studied business for two years at the University of Hong Kong. He took up photography at the age of twenty-four, and was one of the founding members of the Shanghai Camera Club. A friend at the club, Alex Buchman, working as a photojournalist for the China Press, inspired Tata to buy his first Leica and roam the streets for meaningful images. In 1939, he learned academic studio portraiture with Oscar Seepol and later studied with the photographers Lang Jingshan and Liu Xucang. He became adept in his early photographs with the use of lighting and the additive techniques favoured by the pictorialists. His focus on portraiture in these years was partly dictated by the Japanese occupation of Shanghai in 1937, and Tata could not take up photography full-time until 1946, when he arrived in Calcutta. Tata's first exhibition, featuring his pictorialist portraits and Lang's landscapes, was held in 1946.

== Bombay and Shanghai ==
In November 1947, through the efforts of the Indian pictorialist Jehangir N. Unwalla, sixty of Tata's photographs were presented in Bombay. The foreword by Unwalla in the exhibition catalogue cited Julian Smith and Edward Steichen as influences on Tata. Several months later, at another show sponsored by the Bombay Art Society, Tata met French photographer Henri Cartier-Bresson, and through his influence and mentorship, was galvanized to take up photojournalism with renewed vigour. He began to contribute to Bombay periodicals such as Trend and Flashlight.

In 1949, he returned to Shanghai, where he recorded the fall of the Kuomintang and the takeover of the city by Communist troops; for a period, he was accompanied by Cartier-Bresson. Tata remained in the city until 1952. In that year, he married 19-year-old Marketa (Rita) Langer, a Sudeten Czech, who, like Tata, had been raised in Shanghai. They soon fled to Hong Kong. During this period, the Chinese censors seized many of Tata's early photographs. However, he managed to smuggle his images of the revolution out of China with the help of a diplomat. He made a trip to Kashmir and India in 1955, and his photo-essay, "Himalayan Pilgrimage", was published by National Geographic in October 1956.

== Montreal and later years ==
Tata immigrated, with his wife and daughter Antonia, to Canada in 1956 and settled in Montreal. He quickly found work doing stills for documentary films at the National Film Board and became a photo editor for The Montrealer magazine. Partly due to their age difference, Tata's marriage ended in divorce. In the early 1960s, rejecting his former academic style, he destroyed most of his pictorial work apart from the portraits. Tata's photographs continued to appear in publications such as Maclean's, Chatelaine, and Time. He recoiled at being a mere illustrator to a written text, as his aim was for the images to stand independently. Tata came closest to this ideal in his submissions to the magazine Perspectives, where he was allowed to choose from his photo files.

Sometimes on assignment, but increasingly on his initiative, he began to amass a portfolio of Canadian literary and artistic figures, including Michel Tremblay, Leonard Cohen, Bill Reid, Irving Layton, George Bowering, Donald Sutherland, Alice Munro, and Jacques de Tonnancour. Tata preferred to take pictures with a 35mm camera and use the available light in his subjects' home, where they would feel more at ease and their personalities would be more fully evoked by posing amidst their personal possessions. His flowing conversational style, abounding in stories and anecdotes, also helped allay the sitters who were sometimes wary of being photographed. Tata's experience was that the better portraits often started to appear in the middle of the film roll, after subjects had relaxed their guard and became active participants. Most of his portrayals show the person in eye contact or near eye contact with the photographer.

Tata had accumulated thousands of negatives documenting the fall of Shanghai, and an exhibit revised from a 1970 version was mounted at the National Gallery in 1981, entitled Shanghai 1949: Photographs by Sam Tata. In 1983, he journeyed to India for a third time, where he paid particular attention to the ubiquitous symbols of divinity present in daily life. Five years later, a major retrospective of his life and work, The Tata Era / L’Époque Tata, was mounted by the Canadian Museum of Contemporary Photography and toured the country. He received the Canada Council's Victor Martyn Lynch-Staunton Award (1982) and was made a member of the Royal Canadian Academy of Arts. He was awarded in 1990 the lifetime achievement award from the Canadian Association of Professional Image Creators (CAPIC). Forty of his photographs appeared in the 1991 exhibition Canadian Writers at the National Library of Canada.

Books devoted to his photography include Montreal (with Frank Lowe, 1963), Expo 67: Sculpture (1967), A Certain Identity: 50 Portraits (1983), Shanghai 1949: The End of an Era (1989), Portraits of Canadian Writers (1991), and India: Land of My Fathers (2005).

Tata died on July 3, 2005, at 93 in Sooke, British Columbia, Canada. On April 8, 2015, Canada Post issued a permanent domestic stamp with a photograph entitled Angels, Saint-Jean-Baptiste Day, taken in Montreal by Tata in 1962.

== Selected solo exhibitions ==
- Portraits of Canadian Writers, National Library of Canada, Ottawa, 1991
- The Tata Era/ L’Époque Tata, The Canadian Museum of Contemporary Photography, Ottawa, 1988
- Shanghai 1949: Photographs by Sam Tata, National Gallery of Canada, Ottawa, 1981
- A Certain Identity, Centaur Gallery of Photography, Montreal, 1974
- Sam Tata: 30 Photographs, Perception Gallery, Montreal, 1971
- Photographs of Asia, George Eastman House, Rochester, New York, 1958
- Photographs by Sam Tata, Royal Ontario Museum, Toronto, 1957
- A One-Man Show of Photographs by Sam B. Tata, Bombay, 1947

== Selected group exhibitions ==
- It's All Happening So Fast: A Counter-History of the Modern Canadian Environment, Art Museum of the University of Toronto, 2017
- Photography in Canada, National Gallery of Canada, 2017
- Tendances actuelles au Québec: la photographie, Musée d'art contemporain, Montreal, 1979
- La Fête, Rencontres internationales de la photographie, Arles, France, 1978
- The Magic World of Childhood, National Film Board Photo Gallery, Ottawa, 1971
- Three Canadian Photographers: Guenter Karkutt — John Flanders — Sam Tata, National Film Board Photo Gallery, Ottawa, 1970
- Photography at Mid-Century, George Eastman House, Rochester, New York, 1959
- Seventh All-India Exhibition of Photography, Bombay, India, 1948
- Two-person show with Lang Jingshan, Shanghai, 1946

== Collections ==
- National Gallery of Canada, Ottawa
- Musée national des beaux-arts du Québec
- National Portrait Gallery, London
- Winnipeg Art Gallery
- University of Toronto
