= Lü Houmin =

Chinese photographer

- Born: 9 September 1928; Yilan County, Heilongjiang, China
- Died: 9 March 2015 (aged 86); Beijing, China
- Occupation: Photographer of the chinese government
- Political party: Chinese Communist Party
- Awards: Gold medal in Soviet Union International Photography Exhibition (1961); World's Great Artists by New York Eastern and Western Artists Association (1997); Outstanding Contribution Award from International Federation of Photographic Art (1997)

Lü Houmin (Simplified Chinese 吕厚民; 9 September 1928 – 9 March 2015) was a Chinese photographer who gained national and international recognition for taking official photographs of Chinese leaders, most notably Mao Zedong, from 1950 to 1964. Lü started out as a teacher, and later switched to photography. He was called Mao's private photographer because many of his photographs were different from the official ones, showing Mao in a more relaxed and personal manner.

Lü maintained a rather friendly and simple image of Mao Zedong throughout his life and the Cultural Revolution. He received many international photographic awards.

Lü, Xu Xiaobing and Hou Bo have been called the best photographers of Mao.

== Early life ==
Lü Houmin was born on 9 September 1928, to a Han family in Yilan County, Heilongjiang. Houmin taught in an elementary school in March 1948, and then joined the Chinese Communist Party. At the age of 21, he was asked to take photos of top Chinese leaders.

== Career ==
Lü started working as the official photographer for the Chinese government in 1950. He was assigned to take pictures in Zhongnanhai of the main Chinese leaders of that time including chairman Mao Zedong, Premier Zhou Enlai and President Liu Shaoqi. From 1950 to 1957, he worked in the photography section of the Central Garrison Bureau in the General Office of the Chinese Communist Party and was hired by the Xinhua News Agency in 1958. Lü continued taking pictures from 1950 to 1964. Lü had to be always ready to take the correct image; in a 2008 interview with the South China Morning Post in Hong Kong, he said, "You had to have your camera ready at all times, when the time came you could not doubt for a second, then the leaders would not hold the pose for you".

Many of Lü's pictures depicted Mao in a completely different manner from how he was normally seen as leader. The images portrayed him as a family man who enjoyed his free time by playing ping pong, joking with his children, and swimming. Lü refuted claims that Jiang Qing, Mao's third wife, learned photography from him, although he took pictures of her as well.

One of the most famous pictures taken by Lü was of Mao sitting on a stone bench and looking at Lushan Mountain in Jiangxi (1961). Another iconic photograph was taken in 1953 when Mao was embraced by one of the Chinese volunteers who were returning after the Korean War. Mao's son was killed by an airstrike in the War. A picture of Mao and Zhou Enlai showed them standing side by side, smiling and handing papers to each other. In a 2001 interview with People's Daily, Lü said that Mao had given him full freedom and never posed for the pictures, and he never complained about the picture-taking.

=== Positions held ===
Lü Houmin was allowed (by Mao) to travel to Cuba to receive an award for his photography and to attend the opening ceremony for the Film Show of World People against Imperialists. In 1965, he became team leader of the Photography Department of the Xinhua News Agency, Jiangsu Branch. In 1979, he was appointed as the fourth National Literary Federation committee member, and Executive Director and Vice Executive Secretary of the Chinese Photographers Society. In 1985, Lü was the Permanent Secretary of the Secretariat of Chinese Photographers Society. He was also the vice president of the China Literary Federation and the Chinese Photographers Society. He was an honorary member of the China Federation of Literary and Art Circles, fifth vice-chairman, and the sixth and seventh consultant, of the China Photographers Association. His works have been shown in domestic and foreign photo exhibitions, and published in newspapers and magazines. He has held many solo exhibitions in Beijing, Tokyo, and New York City. He published four picture albums: Chairman's Elegant Demeanor, Mao Zedong, Public Servant, and Long Journey of Split of Time. Lü Houmin’s work was represented on the Sariwon Street of Hamhung in 1958. In 1961, he won the silver medal in the German International Photography Exhibition and the gold medal in the Soviet Union International Photography Exhibition. Lü described his period of working with Mao as the golden time in his life. He is regarded as one of the best photographers of Mao Zedong, along with Xu Xiaobing and Hou Bo.

=== Other works ===
Lü took part in an exhibition at the Shanghai Art Museum which featured 100 of his photographs of Mao, titled "Mao Zedong in My Lens". He also attended a photography exhibition in Beijing on 24 December 2014, to celebrate the 111th anniversary of Mao Zedong's birth, which was attended by Xi Jinping, the General Secretary of the Chinese Communist Party. Lu talked about his experience with photography, emphasizing that technology and knowledge are indispensable.

== Views on Mao Zedong ==
Lü described Mao in his own words, "I shall never forget the time I spent with chairman Mao. Although a great leader, he struck me more like a kind older person. His virtues, like his strong will, courage and resourcefulness, tolerance, integrity and simplicity, have always inspired me" Houmin also said that Mao was a person who cared deeply about his staff. According to Lu, Mao was extremely thrifty having only a well-patched blanket and one pair of leather shoes, and he was able to convince the staff not to take advantage of their privileges.

Lü was targeted during the Cultural Revolution and was sent to Jiangsu countryside to be reeducated with his family for seven years. He said that he didn't felt mistreated since he loved the peace and harmony of the countryside, and being close to nature. Later, on his friend's suggestion, he wrote a letter to Mao, thereby getting a new job in Jiangxi. After writing a second letter he was able to return to Beijing. In an interview with Shanghai Daily in 2009, Lü said he never thought to write his memories with Mao since his pictures were more powerful and honest. Lu had a special connection with Mao and kept meeting his family members at memorial activities. He also went to the Mao's memorial hall with former staff every 9 September and 26 December, the dates of Mao's death and birth.

== Death ==
The Shanghai-based media outlet, thepaper.cn, reported Lü's death due to cancer on 9 March 2015. His death was also reported by the China Times (Taiwan). According to Beijing News, Lü's funeral was held on Sunday and was attended by Mao's grandson Mao Xinyu, and hundreds of photographers and artists. Mao had described Lü as "short and hardworking".

== Recognition ==
- Award in Film Show of World People against Imperialists in Cuba, 1961.
- Silver medal in German International Photography Exhibition, 1961.
- Gold medal in Soviet Union International Photography Exhibition, 1961.
- World's Great Artists by New York Eastern and Western Artists Association, January 1997.
- Prize of honor in 24th congress of International Federation of Photographic Art, September 1997.
- Outstanding Contribution Award from International Federation of Photographic Art, November 1997.
