= Xu Xiaobing =

Chinese cinematographer, filmmaker and photojournalist

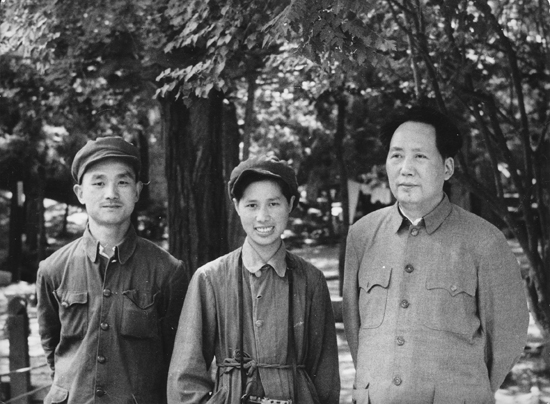
Xu Xiaobing, Hou Bo, and Mao Zedong 1949

Xu Xiaobing 徐肖冰 (16 August 1916 – 27 October 2009) was a Chinese cinematographer, filmmaker, and photojournalist. The Chinese Communist Party commissioned Xu and his wife, Hou Bo, to make an official photographic record to share with the Chinese and world public of Party leaders, scenes of battle, and vignettes of everyday life during the Second Sino-Japanese War (1937–1945) and especially of Mao Zedong from the 1930s down to the 1960s. The couple shot many of the best-known photos of Mao and other leaders.

Xu was a member of the China Federation of Literary and Art Circles and President of the Chinese Photographers' Association. Xu Xiaobing, Hou Bo, and Lu Houmin have been called the best photographers of Mao.

== Early life ==
Xu Xiaobing was born in 1916 in Tongxiang county, Zhejiang, to a family that had declined socially and economically. He was first schooled at home, then, at his grandfather's insistence, sent to a local traditional school, where he studied the Confucian classics.

Xu went to Shanghai in 1932 and began his career in the photographic division of the Tianyi Film Company, then in the Mingxing Film Company, though he was not involved in A list films. These studios were known for their careful use of Hollywood cinematographic styles, which Xu studied and absorbed, and Shanghai in the 1930s was also a place where international art and photography flourished. When he lost his position at Mingxing, his friend Wu Weiyun introduced him to a studio in Wuhan, then, when war broke out in 1937, another friend, Wu Yinxian introduced Xu to the Northwest Film Company (西北电影公司任职) in Taiyuan, in the Northwest province of Shanxi.

== Wartime photography at Yan'an ==
Xu, along with other left-wing photographers, such as Cai Shangxiong made his way to the Communist controlled areas outside Xi'an. He joined the communist Eighth Route Army and was assigned to its Yan'an Film Studio (延安电影制片厂). He and Wu Yinxian were cinematographers for Yuan Muzhi's Fighting Combine: Nanni Bay, as well as battlefield documentaries of his own. Party leaders as the war with Japan continued became even more eager to establish film studios to make their case both to the Chinese public and world opinion, and Xu was quickly given resources and responsibilities. In the summer of 1938 Xu made his first photo of Mao, taken while the rising leader was addressing a training session on military tactics.

Mao Zedong Addresses the Troops

The critic-historian Claire Roberts observes that this 1938 photograph of Mao making a speech at Yan'an "presaged his leadership of the country". She analyzes the message of the photograph by saying that Mao "stands in profile to the right of the frame, his hands placed confidently on his hips, towering over a crowd of soldiers". This pose, she continues, was an "unusual side-on view," in contrast to the traditional way of depicting leaders in a "frontal view in order to emphasize their integrity and authority." But Xu explained his choice in a practical way, saying "If I had stood in front, I would have had to stand in the middle of the crowd", so "all I could do was move over to the side and take the shot".

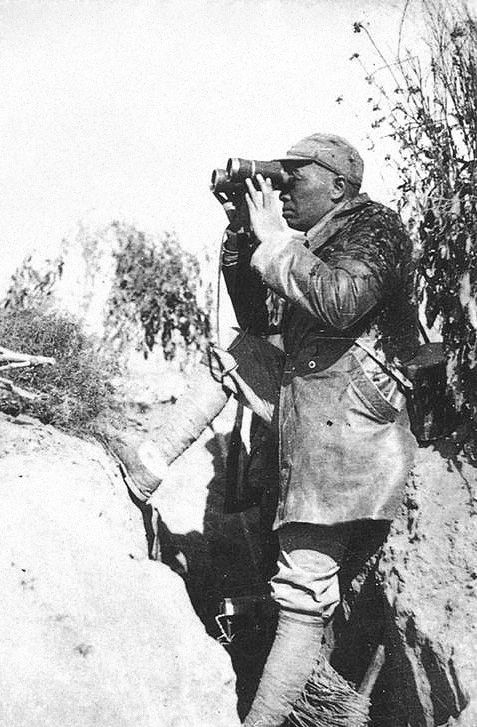
Peng Dehuai Scouts the Enemy (1940)

Xu travelled with the army in Northwest China during campaigns against the Japanese in 1939–1940, where he took candid, on-the-spot photos of battle scenes and everyday life behind the lines. Another historian of Chinese photography adds that at this time there was no "personal" photography in China, since very few people had cameras, and those few were primarily for official use, such as identification, documentation of government projects and political leaders, and for propaganda.

Xu met his future wife, Hou Bo, in Yan'an in early 1942. She was from a poor peasant background, and Xu introduced her to photography. They married in the spring of 1943. According to the austere style of the times, Hou Bo later recalled. "About 10 friends gathered with us in our cave; we bought jujubes and dried buns, and we all sang together". But the couple was separated for much of the time until January 1949, when the PLA entered Beiping. They were reunited in Mao's summer house in the Fragrant Hills temporary headquarters outside the city, where Xu was photographing Mao's meetings with foreign delegations. Mao took an interest in Hou Bo and asked her to join the group of official photographers.

Xu's assignments from 1943 to 1949 produced widely distributed images. Among them was the arrival in Yan'an of United States Special Envoy Patrick Hurley; the negotiations in Chongqing between the Nationalists and the Communists; the North China campaigns of the Eighth Route Army after 1946; and the arrival of Mao and the People's Liberation Army in Beiping in 1949.

== After 1949 ==
Xu's wife, Hou Bo, became Mao Zedong's official photographer and the couple lived in the Forbidden City, the residence of top party officials. By one count, although she was the only woman on the film crew, Hou Bo took more than 400 of the officially published photographs of Mao. The couple, in the words of one China watcher, became "court photographers" who took photos both of Mao in "Stalinesque" poses that became famous propaganda posters and also relaxed pictures of Mao with his family, some on the beach at Beidaihe.

During the Cultural Revolution (1966-1976) the couple was criticized. Jiang Qing, Mao's wife and leader of the radical left wing, charged that Hou "never produced any good pictures of Mao", and Hou spent several years in prison. The leftists did not approve of Xu's photos of Mao's family life and did not allow them to be published.

After Mao's death and the opening of China, the couple, who had retired nearly a decade earlier, published book collections of their work and arranged their papers. The French film-maker Claude Hudelot made a documentary devoted to their lives, They travelled to Europe, where they were honored with exhibitions of their work in London and Paris. Their photographs of Mao were exhibited at the Photographers' Gallery, London, 8 April - 30 May 2004.

Xu Xiaobing died at the age of 93 on October 27, 2009, in the Beijing Military Region General Hospital.
