= Hong Cheong =

Chinese photographer

Hong Cheong (also Hung Chiong and Hung Chong) was a Chinese photographer who operated a photographic studio in Yokohama, Japan, between 1875 and 1885. In addition to his photographic work, he was an artist, chart copier, portrait painter, and dealer in picture frames. Cheong left Japan in 1885 and opened a studio in Hong Kong. His photographic works included large format hand-coloured albumen prints.

It is possible that Hong Cheong was related to Tong Cheong, the Chinese operator of another photographic studio in Yokohama known from an advertisement of 1884.
