= Chen Jiagang =

Chinese architect and photographer

Chen Jiagang 陈家刚
- Born: 1962 (age 63–64); Chongqing, China
- Education: Chongqing Architecture College
- Known for: Photography
- Style: Documentary and staged photography

Chen Jiagang (Chinese: 陈家刚, born in 1962 in Chongqing, People's Republic of China), a Chinese architect and photographer. His works, particularly focusing on the vanishing legacy of the country's "Third Line" military cities, "combined the Chinese countryside, factories and markets of cities with millions, industrial architecture and still-life human figures into hypnotic images", has earned him recognition both in China and internationally.

== Education and early career (1980–1992) ==
Chen Jiagang began his career in architecture. From 1980 to 1984, he studied at the Architecture College of Chongqing University, where he developed the foundation of his architectural and design skills. Upon graduation, he worked at the Southwest Architecture Design Institute from 1984 to 1992, where he became a National Certified Architect.

== Entrepreneurial Ventures in Architecture and Property Development (1992–1999) ==
In 1992, Jiagang transitioned from his role as an architect to become a developer and entrepreneur, founding Chengdu Haosi Property Development, a company that contributed to urban development in Chengdu. His growing interest in shaping the built environment led him to establish Sichuan Gangjia Architecture Design in 1996, a firm dedicated to architectural innovation and planning.

By 1997, Jiagang had founded Sichuan Upriver Stock Co., Ltd, marking his entry into larger-scale ventures, and that same year, he launched Upriver Art Gallery, which became the first private art gallery in China. This bold move not only established Jiagang as a forward-thinking businessman but also marked the beginning of his engagement with the arts and cultural landscape.

Chen Jiagang continued to bridge the gap between architecture and culture with the founding of the Chengdu Upriver Guildhall and the Kunming Upriver Guildhall in 1998. These guildhalls served as important cultural and social spaces, fostering dialogue between the arts, architecture, and the community.

In 1999, Jiagang was recognized on an international stage when he was named one of the twelve "Outstanding Young Architects" of China by the United Nations. This accolade further solidified his reputation in the architectural world and underscored his contributions to China's urban and architectural development.

== Transition to Art (2001–Present) ==
In 2001, Jiagang made a significant career shift, transitioning from architecture to become a full-time artist. This marked a turning point in his life, where he began to focus on capturing the changing landscape of China through photography.

His photography career gained momentum in 2003 when he began working on his Third Front series, later expanding to The Great Third Front in 2008. These series focus on documenting the remnants of China's "Third Line" cities—vast military-industrial complexes built during the 1960s under Mao Zedong’s directive to fortify China’s interior against potential threats. Jiagang’s large-format photographs present these cities as decaying remnants of a once-glorified industrial era, bringing attention to their fading collective memory and questioning their future relevance in a rapidly modernizing China.

In 2002 and 2003, he received Excellent Works Prizes at the 20th and 21st China Photographic Exhibitions. His work continues to explore themes of memory, displacement, and the tension between historical grandeur and the uncertain future of industrial relics.

His works are in collections of 21C Museum, Louisville, Kentucky, USA; Art Gallery of Central Academy of Fine Arts, Beijing, China; Baltimore Museum of Art, Baltimore, USA; Borusan Contemporary, Turkey; Institut Valencia d´ Art Modern (IVAM), Spain; The Museum of Modern Art (MoMA), New York, USA; Museo del Territorio, Biella, Italy, multiple private collections.

== Exhibitions ==
- 2004 Light•Space•Time: Solo exhibition for photographic works by Chen Jiagang, Tokyo Art Projects, Beijing, China
- 2005 Genre (Blue Top Arts Centre, Chengdu, China)
- 2006 Chen Jiagang’s works “Third Front” (Atelier Werner Schaarmann, Hamburg, Germany)
- 2007 Third Front (Paris-Beijing Photo Gallery, Beijing, China)
- 2007 China Forbidden City (Chinasquare Gallery, New York, USA)
- 2007 Diseased City, Art Gallery of Central Academy of Fine Arts, Beijing, China)
- 2008 Chen Jiagang: The Great Third Front (Edwynn Houk Gallery, New York, USA)
- 2008 Chen Jiagang: The Great Third Front (Paris-Beijing Photo Gallery, Beijing, China)
- 2008 Kalpa: Works by Chen Jiagang (Song Zhuang Art Center, Beijing)
- 2008 China Smog from our History:Photographs from Chen Jiagang's Third Front series, Contemporary by Angela Li (Hong Kong, China)
- 2009 Smog City, Contemporary by Angela Li, Hong Kong, China Third Front (Paris-Beijing Photo Gallery, Paris, France Crossroads, Paris-Beijing Photo Gallery, Beijing, China)
- 2010 White Box Museum of Art, Beijing, China The Great Third Front (Poligono Gallery, Malaga, Spain)
- 2011 Han Art Gallery (Montreal, Canada)
- 2012 Contemporary by Angela Li (Hong Kong, China Galerie Paris-Beijing, Paris, France Galerie Forsblom, Helsinki, Finland)
- 2014 The Great Three Gorges, (Galerie Edwynn Houk, Zürich, Switzerland)
- 2015 Moscow Museum of Modern Art (Moscow, Russia)
- 2024 Salo Art Museum Veturitalli (Salo, Finland)

== Awards ==
- 1999 United Nations 12 “Outstanding Young Architects”
- 2002- 2003 Excellent Works Prize in the 20th China Photographic Art Exhibition
