= Tong Cheong =

Chinese photographer active in Japan

Tong Cheong was a Chinese photographer who operated in Yokohama, Japan in the 19th century. Cheong advertised his services as a printer and photographer in the 1884 Japan Directory, offering souvenir albums of the "views and costumes" of Japan. The 1885 advertisement for his business, now called Tong Cheong Brothers, has no mention of photography, simply noting services as printers and bookbinders. Following a period in which many foreign photographers were living and working in Japan, by the end of 1886 Tong Cheong and Adolfo Farsari were the only foreign commercial photographers still operating in the country. By the following year Cheong had left Japan.

It is possible that Tong Cheong was related to Hong Cheong, the Chinese operator of another photographic studio in Yokohama between 1875 and 1885.
