= Tchan Fou-li =

Tchan Fou-li 陳復禮
- Born: June 21, 1916; Chaozhou, Guangdong, China
- Died: September 11, 2018 (aged 102); Hong Kong
- Known for: Photography

Tchan Fou-li (simplified Chinese: 陈复礼; traditional Chinese: 陳復禮; pinyin: Chén Fùlǐ; June 21, 1916 – September 11, 2018) was a Hong Kong photographer who worked to develop distinctive Chinese forms of photography and to establish photography as a serious art form in Hong Kong. He is known for his photographs, described as evoking the artistic values and composition of Chinese landscape paintings. A New York Times reviewer called him "one of the great visual artists of his time" because of his "carefully crafted images that celebrate the beauty of the human condition and the majesty of nature."

== Biography ==
Tchan was born on June 21, 1916, in Chao'an, Chaozhou (Teochew) in eastern Guangdong Province. Tchan graduated from the Guangdong Provincial Second Normal School in 1934, but learned to appreciate painting, music, and poetry from his father. As he explained to a reporter late in his life, "I never received formal art training, but my father liked paintings and calligraphy. I loved paintings but could not paint, photography allowed me to create pictures."

In 1944, Tchan moved to Vietnam in order to run a trading business but spent more and more time with photography. One of his most important influences was Lang Jingshan (1892-1995), whose photography was rooted in Chinese painting. Tchan followed Lang's example in montage works which printed several negatives into one image in order to evoke a Chinese painting. For instance, in the early 1950s, Tchan produced photographs which used the “one corner” pictorial style of the Song dynasty painter Ma Yuan (1189-1224). Although still pursuing photography as an amateur, after returning to Hong Kong in 1955, Tchan traveled to many countries on photographic expeditions, including Vietnam, Thailand, and Cambodia. In these photographs Tchan declared that his new ambition was to portray "the real object in collaboration with the skill of pictorial depiction," that is, to show the lives of ordinary people in vivid and aesthetically rigorous images. In 1959 and 1962 he returned to China, and photographed the classic landscapes of Guilin and Huangshan. In a 1962 essay, "Chinese Pictorial Painting and Landscape Photography" Tchang argued that restricting himself to black-and-white was similar to the three-dimensional textures and forms of Chinese paintings and that his use of space simplified the structures and enhanced the viewer's sense of solidity and emptiness.

Although the period of political turmoil during the Cultural Revolution in the 1960s and early 1970s was not productive for him, by the 1980s Tchan had developed an interest in ethnic photography and worked to encourage photo tourism to China's minority areas. In this period he frequently added brushstrokes to his photos, often taking inspiration from Western style paintings as well. In Hong Kong he founded the Chinese Photographic Association of Hong Kong.

Tchan died on 11 September 2018 in Hong Kong, aged 102.

== Major works and exhibitions ==
- Hong Kong Heritage Museum (2009). The Verve of Light and Shadow : Master Photographers, Tchan Fou-Li, Kan Hing-Fook, Leo K.K. Wong. Hong Kong: Leisure and Cultural Services Dept. ISBN 978-9627213666. Catalog of exhibitions held on Mar. 29, 2009 to Oct. 26, 2009 at Hong Kong Heritage Museum.
- Chen, Fuli (2005). 詩影凡心 : 作品・文論・圖傳 Shi Ying Fan Xin : Zuo Pin, Wen Lun, Tu Zhuan (My Hearltfelt Poetic Moments). Hong Kong: Xianggang Zhongguo lü you chu ban she. ISBN 9628746820.
- —— (1988). 中國風景綫 : 陳復禮旅遊攝影集 Zhongguo Feng Jing Xian : Chen Fuli Lü You She Ying Ji (China's Scenic Beauty through the Camera of Tchan Fou-Li). Hong Kong: San lian shu dian. ISBN 9620406087.
