= Feng Xuemin =

Chinese photographer

Feng Xuemin (born 1953) is a Chinese photographer. He has lived in Japan since 1985.

Born in Shanghai, he traveled to Japan in 1985 as a sponsored researcher for the Chinese News & Publication Association, and has held exhibitions throughout Japan, China, the United States, Canada and France. In August 2007, he exhibited work in New York as part of a United Nations exhibition.

In 1999, he was the first non-Japanese to receive a Taiyō Award. He won the gold prize at the World Chinese Art Exhibition in 2000.
