= Zhuang Xueben =

Chinese ethnographic photographer

- 莊學本
- Born: 1909; Pudong, Shanghai, China
- Died: 1984 (aged 74–75); Shanghai
- Occupation: documentary photographer
- Known for: pioneering ethnographic photography

Zhuang Xueben (traditional Chinese: 莊學本; simplified Chinese: 庄学本; 1909–1984) was one of China's first ethnographic photographers. In the 1930s, he left his native Shanghai and travelled to western China to photograph the minority people in four provinces: Sichuan, Yunnan, Gansu, and Qinghai. During the almost ten years of ethnographic research, he took more than ten thousand photographs and wrote a vast amount of materials including research reports, travel notes, and journals. In 1941, he held a photographic exhibition on Xikang in several Chinese cities and about 200,000 people attended the exhibit. These photos and written materials have become a valuable source for anthropologists to the ethnic groups in western China.

== Introduction ==
Zhuang Xueben was born in Shanghai in 1909. He left the city in 1930 and began to photograph the minority regions of western China. He mainly travelled in the provinces of Sichuan, Yunnan, Gansu, and Qinghai. Although he accompanied the 9th Panchen Lama on his journey to Tibet, he was never able to enter Tibet because of political difficulties between Tibet and China. He lived for long periods of time with the 16 minority groups he photographed, each of which spoke a different language. Many of his subjects were Tibetan Buddhists. The first trip took him nine months.

One of his goals was to make the Chinese world aware of these peoples and lands so they would come to value them. He photographed them with great dignity and empathy. Unlike so many “ethnographic” or “anthropological” artists, Zhuang Xueben was able to close the distance between himself and his subjects. He saw their beauty and recorded it. Although self-taught, he had an artist's eye. He was aware of the importance and rigor of good art, and he wrote about the connection of art and science. He kept meticulous notes about his travels and his work.

As Chinese art critic and writer Zhu Qi says, “Zhuang Xueben’s ‘anthropological’ photography is comparable to any western photography of its kind in the last century.” These works from the 1930s represent one of the richest periods of Zhuang Xueben’s photographic work. At a time when China itself was in turmoil, caught between the Japanese invasion on the east and north and British dominance in Tibet, the western border regions of China were vital to China’s security. They were also virtually unknown lands to most Chinese, and the government itself. Curious, perhaps deeply patriotic, Zhuang Xueben, as a young man, was conscious of the importance of these regions and their fascination.

Due to the Cultural Revolution, Zhuang Xueben’s work lay unseen and unknown for many years. Recently, Chinese scholars have re-discovered his work, and Zhuang Xueben’s son, Zhuang Wenjun, has been instrumental in retrieving and preserving his father’s work.

== Chronicle of events ==
- In 1909, Zhuang Xueben was born in a peasant family in Pudong outside Shanghai. His father doubled as farmer and teacher in a private school.
- In 1924, he quit from Shanghai Xunyuan Middle School because his family could no longer afford it. The next year when he was 16 years old, he started to work in several companies as an intern in Shanghai.
- In 1930, for seeking for genuine knowledge, he joined “National Pedestrian Team” formed by five educated youths and started his journey from Shanghai to northern China. They made social investigation and visited famous figures of cultural and educational circles like Tao Xingzhi on their journey. Finally, they had to go back to Shanghai from Beijing because of the Second Zhili–Fengtian War.
- In 1931, Japan occupied Manchuria after the Mukden Incident. As many youths thought that every man had a share of responsibility for the fate of his country, Zhuang Xueben was also filled with patriotic sentiments at that time. He decided to do explore western China and introduce the real state of minority people's lives to the world.
- In 1934, the 13th Dalai Lama died in Lhasa. The Kuomintang government organized a special delegation to Lhasa to attend Dalai Lama's funeral service. As a stringer of the Liangyou Pictorial (良友画报), Zhonghua Pictorial (中华画报), and Shen Bao, Zhuang Xueben entered western China with the Kuomintang special delegation, but they were refused entry to Tibet by Tibetan government when they arrived at Chengdu. Therefore, Zhuang Xueben planned to do ethnographic research in Golog Tibetan Region. That area was called “white land” or “uninhabited land” at that time because the positions or names of Golog was not marked on a map, and Tibetans in that area were known as “uncivilized man-eating minorities”. He got a tour passport with his friends’ help in Nanjing and started his adventure to Golog. Went up north through Li County, Barkam, he reached Ngawa in Sichuan Province. Having an opportunity to arbitrate the battle between the local tribe and warlord, he became the young chief Mosang's sworn brother. Finally he arrived at Golog and did research on Tibetans for nine months. His travel notes and thousands of photographs appeared in instalments in the Central Daily News, Shen Bao, and Liangyou Pictorial. In addition, he held a personal photographic exhibition in Nanjing and finished his first monograph Qiang Rong Investigation Report (羌戎考察记).
- During 1935 and 1937, he was hired as the photographer by Kuomintang government to squire the 9th Panchen Lama to Tibet with the Kuomintang Special Delegation. The Academia Sinica asked him to measure the western minority people's physiques and Sun Yat-sen Culture & Education Center requested him to collect samples of minority cultural relics. Zhuang Xueben and Kuomintang Special Delegation followed the 9th Panchen Lama to travel through Nanjing, Xi’an, Lanzhou, Xining, Golog, and arrived at Yushu. He documented the Buddhism ceremonies held by the 9th Panchen Lama in the Kumbum Monastery in Qinghai and the Labrang Monastery in Gansu. Furthermore, he visited minority groups such as Mongols, Tibetans, Monguor, and Salar people in his leisure time on the trip, especially the “Tiny Feet Monguor” in Minhe County, Qinghai. Liangyou Pictorial and Shen Bao serialized his travel notes and photographs titled Journey to the West (西游记) and Travels in Qinghai (青海旅行记).
- In January 1938, Zhuang Xueben was hired as a consultant by the Xikang Provincial Government to do research on minority groups. He went to Danba first to explore the Jiarong people in the Dajinchuan (大金川) river valley and the Yi people in Yuexitianba area (越西田坝).
- In early 1939, he disguised himself as a mailman to enter some significant regions, such as Zhaojue – the center of Yi Society, Muli – the Kingdom of Tibetan Buddhist monks, Lugu Lake – a matriarchal society. Later he went to photograph Tibetan dramas in Batang Tibetan Region. In spring 1940, he went back to Kangding braving wind and snow. During this period, he documented the minority groups including Tibetan, Yi, Pumi, Miao, Lisu, and Naxi, and published A Research Report on the Yi People in Xikang (西康彝族调查报告), Special Issue of New Xikang (新西康专号), and My Adventure in Xikang Tibetan Region (西康猎奇记).
- In 1941, Zhuang Xueben's photographic exhibition on Xikang, held in Chongqing, Chengdu, and Ya’an. The exhibition introduced Xikang's landscape, geographical features, nationalities, and products to the world, and attracted about 200,000 people, including many Kuomintang senior officers like Sun Ko, Yu Youren, Kong Xiangxi, Chen Lifu, Chen Guofu, and many public figures including Guo Moruo, Tian Han, Huang Yanpei, and Xu Shoutang.
- In 1942, he traveled to India and visited New Delhi, Bombay, Darjeeling, and Kalimpong. More than one thousand photographs he took in India were edited into a photography collection Xi Zhu Jian Ying (西竺剪影), or Photographs Taken in India, and published in Calcutta, India in 1945.
- After the victory over Japan in 1945, Zhuang Xueben went back to Shanghai to visit his family that he had been out of touch for ten years. He spent several months with his family and sorted out his photographs and travel notes. A book filled with photographs and introductions, Shi Nian Xi Xing Ji 《十年西行记》, or Ten Years in Western China was published soon.
- In 1948, Ji Shi Shan Qu Ying Zhan 积石山区影展, or An Exhibition of Photographs Taken in Jishishan Region held in Nanjing, Shanghai, and Hangzhou. In addition, Kang Zang Min Jian Gu Shi 《康藏民间故事》, or Folktales of Kham Tibetan Region was published by Shanghai Times Bookshop.
- In October 1949, the People's Republic of China was founded. Zhuang Xueben became an editor in the Editorial Departments of the Nationalities Press (民族出版社) and the Nationalities Pictorial (民族画报). The style of his photographs had changed sensibly. He still visited minority areas and took portraits as an official photographer, but he had to take photographs which fulfilled the political demands.
- During 1950 – 1952, he visited minority areas such as Sichuan, Xikang, Yunnan, Guizhou, Inner Mongolia, and Northwest China with the Chinese Central Visiting Mission (中央访问团).
- In 1952, he joined the founding celebration of Guangxi Zhuang Autonomous Region and visited Yao people in Jinxiu and Miao people in Rongshui.
- In 1953, he visited Yanbian Korean Autonomous Prefecture in Jilin Province.
- In 1954, he went to western and eastern Inner Mongolia to interview Mongolians, Manchu, Daur people, and Evenks.
- In 1958, he revisited Qiang area in Sichuan Province.
- In 1965, the Chinese Cultural Revolution was launched. Zhuang Xueben and his wife were expelled from the Editorial Department of Nationalities Pictorial because of “historical problem”. The Chinese government forced them to turn in all of their property including more than ten thousand of photographs and leave Beijing. Therefore, Zhuang Xueben went back to Shanghai with his family and stopped his photographic career. More than half of his photographs and travel notes were burned during the Cultural Revolution.
- In 1975, the Chinese government redressed him after ten-year Cultural Revolution, but he had already had a hemiplegia and couldn't move.
- In 1980, Zhuang Xueben Shao Shu Min Zu She Ying Xuan 《庄学本少数民族摄影选》, or Zhuang Xueben’s Minority People Photography Elects, published by People's Fine Arts Publishing House of China.
- In 1984, Zhuang Xueben died at his home in Pudong, Shanghai. Chinese government prohibited mourners to write "photographer" in the lament at his funeral.

== Exhibitions ==
- Ge Ren She Ying Zhan 个人摄影展, or A Personal Photographic Exhibition, held in Nanjing in 1935;
- Xi Kang Ying Zhan 西康影展, or An Exhibition of the Photographs Taken in Xikang Region, held in Chongqing, Chengdu, and Ya’an in 1941;
- Ji Shi Shan Qu Ying Zhan 积石山区影展, or An Exhibition of the Photographs Taken in Jishishan Region, held in Nanjing, Shanghai, and Hangzhou in 1948;
- Kang Ding Lao Zhao Pian Zhan Lan 康定老照片展览, or An Exhibition of Old Photographs of Kangding Region, held in Kangding in 2004;
- Zhuang Xueben She Ying Zuo Pin Zhan 庄学本摄影作品展, or An Exhibition of Zhang Xueben's Photographs, held in Lianzhou, 2005;
- Zhuang Xueben She Ying Zuo Pin Zhan 庄学本摄影作品展, or An Exhibition of Zhang Xueben's Photographs, held in Houston, USA in 2008;
- Zhuang Xueben She Ying Zuo Pin Zhan 庄学本摄影作品展, or An Exhibition of Zhang Xueben's Photographs, held in Daegu, South Korea, 2008;
- Zhuang Xueben Bai Nian Dan Chen Hui Gu Zhan 庄学本百年诞辰回顾展, or A Photographic Exhibition Commemorating the Centenary of Zhuang Xueben's Birth, held in Guangdong, 2009;
- Hui Mou Jing Dian – Zhuang Xueben Zang Zu She Ying Zuo Pin Zhan 回眸经典 —— 庄学本藏族摄影作品展, or Reviewing Classics – An Exhibition of Zhuang Xueben's Photographs Taken in Tibet, held in Nanjing Museum in May 2010.

== Publications ==
- Kang Zang Jin Shi (Current Events in Tibet) 《康藏近事》; October 1934
- Kuo Luo Ke Di Fang Feng Tu Ren Qing (The Custom of Golog Tibetan Region) 《廓洛克地方风土人情》; January 1935
- Yu Wang Miao Yi (King *Dayu’s Descendants: Miao People) 《禹王苗裔》; September 1935
- Shan Xi Nong Cun Yin Xiang (The Countryside of Shaanxi Province) 《陕西农村印象》; April 1936
- Qinghai Lü Xing Ji (Travels in Qinghai) 《青海旅行记》; May 1936
- Lian Ai Zai Qing Hai (Love in Qinghai Province) 《恋爱在青海》; May 1936
- Cong Xi Jing Dao Qing Hai (From Xijing to Qinghai) 《从西京到青海》; June 1936
- Qing Hai Tu Ren Zhi Luo Man Si (Love of Monguor in Qinghai Province) 《青海土人之罗曼斯》; June 1936
- Qing Hai Fu Nü Yu Tou Shi (Headdress of Qinghai Women) 《青海妇女与头饰》; September 1936
- Cong Lan Zhou Dao La Bu Leng (From Lanzhou City to Labrang Monastery) 《从兰州到拉卜楞》; December 1936
- Qing Hai Min Su (The Folk Custom of Qinghai Province) 《青海民俗》; February 1937
- Qiang Rong Kao Cha Ji (An Investigation Report of Qiang and Rong People) 《羌戎考察记》; March 1937
- Qing Hai Zhi Sa La Min Zu (The Salar People of Qinghai Province) 《青海之撒拉民俗》; July 1937
- Xi Kang Yi Zu Diao Cha Bao Gao (An Investigation Report of the Yi People in Xikang) 《西康彝族调查报告》; May 1941
- Shi Nian Xi Xing Ji (Ten Years in Western China) 《十年西行记》; 1945
- Kang Zang Min Jian Gu Shi (Folktales of Kangba Tibetan Region) 《康藏民间故事》; 1950
- Zhuang Xueben shao shu min zu she ying xuan (Selected Photographs of Ethnic Minorities by Zhuang Xueben) 《庄学本少数民族摄影选》; 1980
- Chen Feng De Li Shi Shun Jian (The World Forgotten by History) 《尘封的历史瞬间》; 2005
- Zhuang Xueben Quan Ji (The Complete Works of Zhuang Xueben) 《庄学本全集》; 2009

== Evaluations ==
An equal relationship and deep communication with the people he photographed. He lived and ate with those people, exchanged presents with them, made them happy by playing a gramophone... and letting them view his pictures. He gave them pictures. People were astonished by their pictures and passed the pictures on to others and this created a believable, warm atmosphere between them. It also made his pictures vivid, nature, relaxed, genuine, reflecting a true living status of the western minorities. (Zhuang Wenjun 庄文骏, Zhuang Xueben's son)

These unmarked regions, without marked positions or names on a map, were referred to as the “uninhabited land”. In the first half of the twentieth century, free-lance photographers who visited this “uninhabited land” on the borders of China were few enough to be easily counted. Among them, Zhuang Xueben's “anthropological” photography is comparable to any western photography of its kind in the last century. His photography was more a depiction of the spirit of the locals, whether the headman, the beautiful girl, the Kangba man, or the wrinkled elder. They all embody a sense of calmness, self-sufficiency and purity. They stare into the camera with serenity – there is neither anxiety nor attempt at performance. They seem to enjoy the ritual of looking at themselves, and noticing time passing by peacefully. Looking at the people in these pictures, one has the wish to become like them, to be able to attain that pure and noble satisfaction of being. (Zhu Qi *朱其, Chinese art critic and writer)

== Bibliography ==
- Zhuang Xueben 庄学本 (2005). 尘封的历史瞬间 Chen Feng De Li Shi Shun Jian (The World Forgotten by History). Chengdu, Sichuan, China: Sichuan Nationalities Press. p. 231. ISBN 9787540930868.
- Zhuang Xueben 庄学本 (2009). 庄学本全集 Zhuang Xueben Quan Ji (The Complete Works of Zhuang Xueben). Beijing, China: Zhonghua Book Company. p. 763. ISBN 9787101068597.
