= Liu Xucang =

Photograph of Liu Xu Chang (刘旭沧).

Liu Xucang (Chinese: 刘旭沧; 1913–1966) was a photographer, born in Nanxun, Huzhou, Zhejiang. Liu pioneered in the use of color film, photography of everyday objects, and nudes. He was twice elected secretary of the Chinese Photographers Association 中国摄影家协会. He died in 1966, at the beginning of the Cultural Revolution, presumably as a result of political harassment.

== Career as a photographer ==
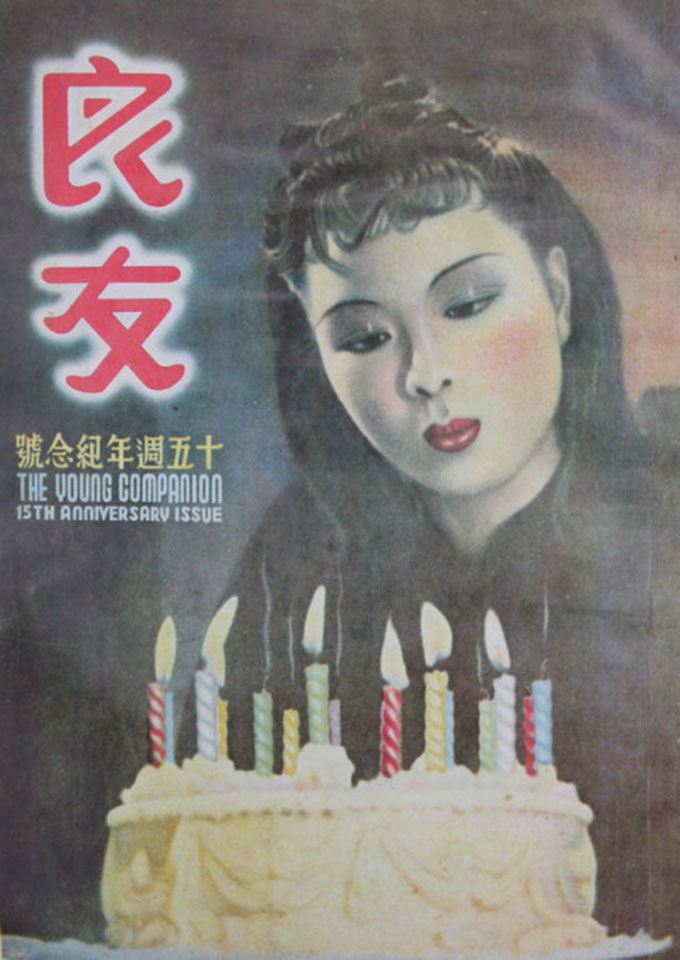
One of Xucang's photos that made a magazine cover, The Young Companion issue 162, 15th Anniversary Issue.

Liu Xucang was born into an affluent provincial family, and learned German and English in his early years. From his teens, he pursued photography, picking up darkroom techniques from observing a nearby photography studio. He moved to Shanghai with his family, reading books and magazines about photography, attending photographic exhibitions, and became acquainted with the Shanghai photographer Lang Jingshan. He did not study photography formally. In 1932, he collaborated with a friend to found the Art Life magazine, with himself as editor, to promote photographic art. He studied with Zhang Chongren to learn drawing, water color, and oil painting. After 1945 he worked in commercial photography and the film industry. In 1956 the Photographic Society of China was established and Liu he was elected executive director. Starting in the 1930s, his work was exhibited in Europe and North America.
