= Lang Jingshan =

Chinese photojournalist (1892–1995)

Lang Jingshan 郎靜山
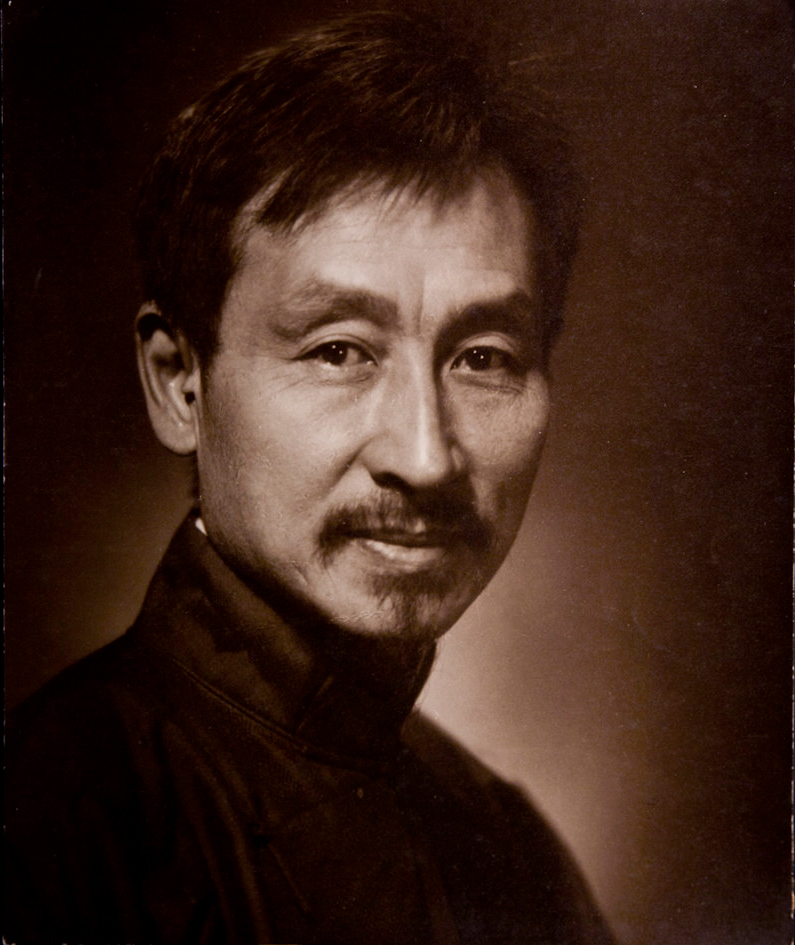
- Lang Jingshan, photograph by Sam Sanzetti
- Born: 4 August 1892; Huai'an, Jiangsu, Qing China
- Died: April 13, 1995 (aged 102); Taipei, Taiwan
- Education: Nanyang High School
- Known for: Photography

Lang Jingshan (Chinese: 郎靜山, Láng Jìngshān; 4 August 1892 – 13 April 1995), also romanized as Long Chin-san and Lang Ching-shan, was a pioneering photographer and one of the first Chinese photojournalists. He has been called "indisputably the most prominent figure in the history of Chinese art photography", and the "Father of Asian Photography". He joined the Royal Photographic Society in 1937 and gained his Associateship in 1940 and Fellowship in 1942. and in 1980, the Photographic Society of America named him one of the world's top ten master photographers. He was the first Chinese photographer to take artistic nude shots, and was also known for the unique "composite photography" technique he created.

== Early life and education ==
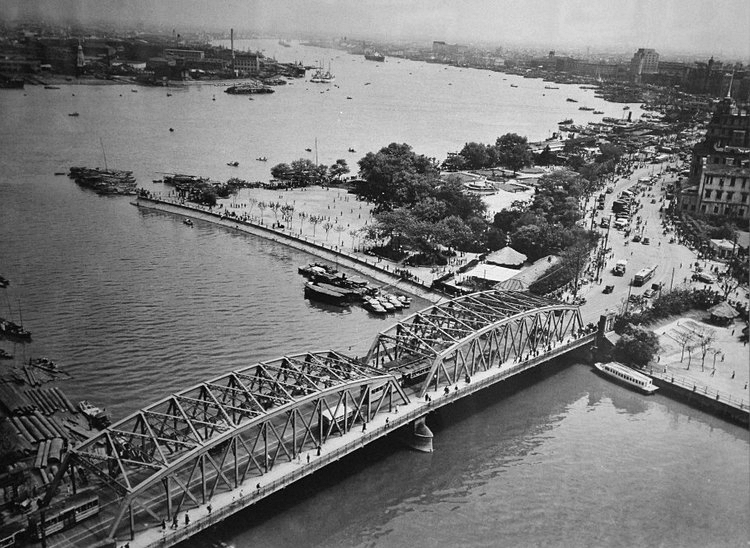
Lang's photograph of Shanghai's Waibaidu Bridge

Lang Jingshan was born in Huai'an, Jiangsu province, in 1892, but was considered a native of his ancestral hometown Lanxi, Zhejiang, by Chinese convention. His father, Lang Jintang (郎錦堂), was a Qing dynasty military officer who was interested in art and photography, and Jingshan grew up influenced by the arts. At age 12, while a student at Nanyang Middle School in Shanghai, he received his first training in photography from his art teacher Li Jinglan (李靖蘭), who instructed him in the techniques of photography.

== Career ==
In 1911, Lang began working for Shanghai's Shen Bao newspaper in advertising design. In 1926, he joined the Eastern Times (時報) newspaper as one of China's first photojournalists. In 1928, Hu Boxiang (胡伯翔), Chen Wanli (陳萬里), and Zhang Xiuzhen (張秀珍) founded the China Photography Association, China's first art photography association, in Shanghai. Lang, Hu, and manhua artist Ding Song were key participants of the society.

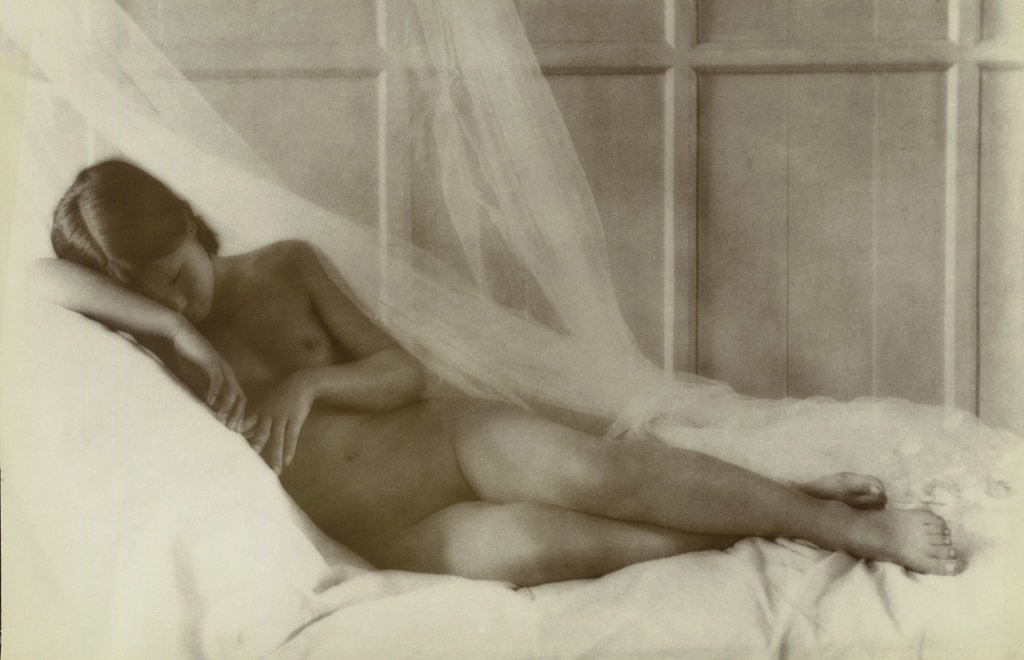
Meditation (1928), the earliest surviving Chinese artistic nude photograph

Lang's work was multifaceted. Commercial newspaper jobs made him one of China's first photojournalists, but his work in other areas put artistic values first. In 1928, he took what is considered the earliest surviving Chinese artistic nude photograph, "Meditation" (the model's father beat her when he heard what she had done). In 1930, he published the Album of Nude Photographs, the first in China. He exhibited his own work widely including After the Tang Masters in the Royal Photographic Society's 1937 Exhibition and Majestic Solitude (1937) in the Royal Photographic Society's 1940 Exhibition.

Long Chinsan's photographic works were influenced by the landscape pictures of masters in the Northern Song dynasty, and he praised also the elegance of the vivid spirit of Chinese painting. It is the first generation of Chinese art photography masters, and his wisdom in art has made the "composite picture（composition in the dark room）". The so-called "composite" is the multi-bottom synthesis, that is, during the developing procedure, the selected negatives were zooming in, using light-enhancing hand gestures to unify the shades in the darkroom. The artistic creation is performed on the composition, focusing on rhythmic vitality. He achieved composite pictures besides very few times by using brush and ink on the negatives. Together with his friend, Hu Boxiang, he established several photography groups and organized a series of exhibits which also traveled to Japan, the United States, and England.

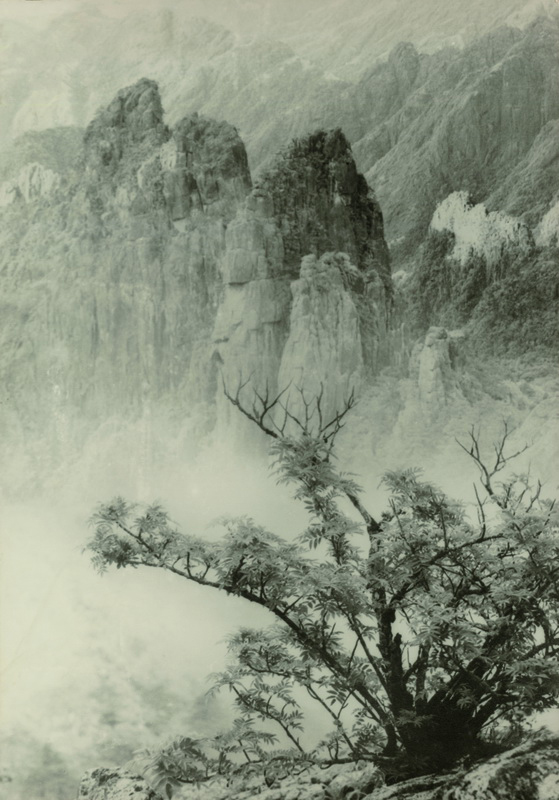
Majestic Solitude (1934), in the style of traditional Chinese ink painting

In 1939, Aurora University in Shanghai staged an exhibition of his works which demonstrated the concepts of Chinese painting in photography. When the Japanese occupied Shanghai during the Second Sino-Japanese War, he moved to inland Sichuan province, and returned to Shanghai after the war. With the Communist takeover of mainland China, he moved to Taiwan in the summer of 1949, but had to leave most of his photography equipment behind. Lang cofounded the Chinese Writers’ and Artists’ Association in 1950. In March 1953, the China Photography Association was reestablished in Taipei, and Lang served as its director for 42 years.

Beginning in the 1960s, Lang Jingshan's photography turned to creative landscape with figures, many modeled on paintings by Zhang Daqian, showing Taoist influence. He received awards from the Ministry of Education. In 1968 he visited the United States and the Kodak factories in New York state. In 1981 and 1983 he had solo retrospectives exhibitions in France, and in 1984 in Hong Kong. The 1991 "Lang Ching-shan Centenary Exhibition" was held in Beijing at the Palace Museum.

In October 2013, the National Art Museum of China (NAMOC) staged a special exhibition of Lang's art entitled "Distant Melody from Quiet Mountains". Lang Jingshan's daughter, Lang Yuwen, donated 134 of his artworks, including "Meditation", to NAMOC.

== Style and influences ==
Lang committed himself to teaching and spreading his ideas of a Chinese photography. His Chinese painting style photos were urged by the pioneering photographer and literary statesman Liu Bannong, who argued as early as 1928 that China should have its own style rooted in Chinese culture while Lang also viewed the scene of Chinese smoking marijuana and binding women's small feet spread by foreign journalists ."In turn he and his style influenced such younger photographers as Liu Xucang, and Tchan Fou-li, who worked in Hong Kong. He published an important article titled 'Composite Pictures and Chinese Art' in the Royal Photographic Society's Journal in February 1942 which reproduced and discussed his photograph Au Printemps.

== Personal life ==
Lang married four times and had fifteen sons and daughters. He died on 13 April 1995 in Taipei at the age of 102.

== Selected works ==
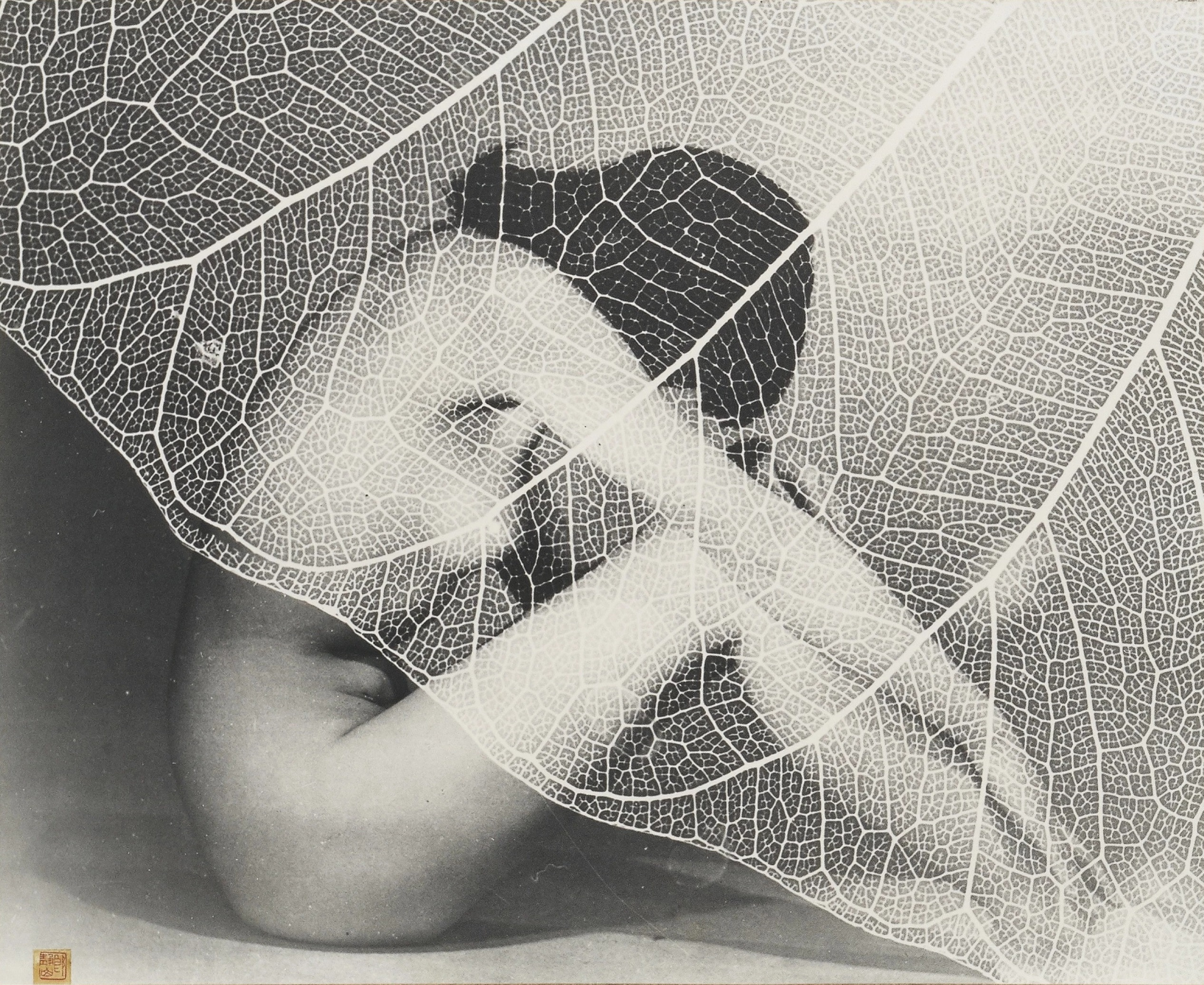
Beauty Separated by Autumn Water, 1932

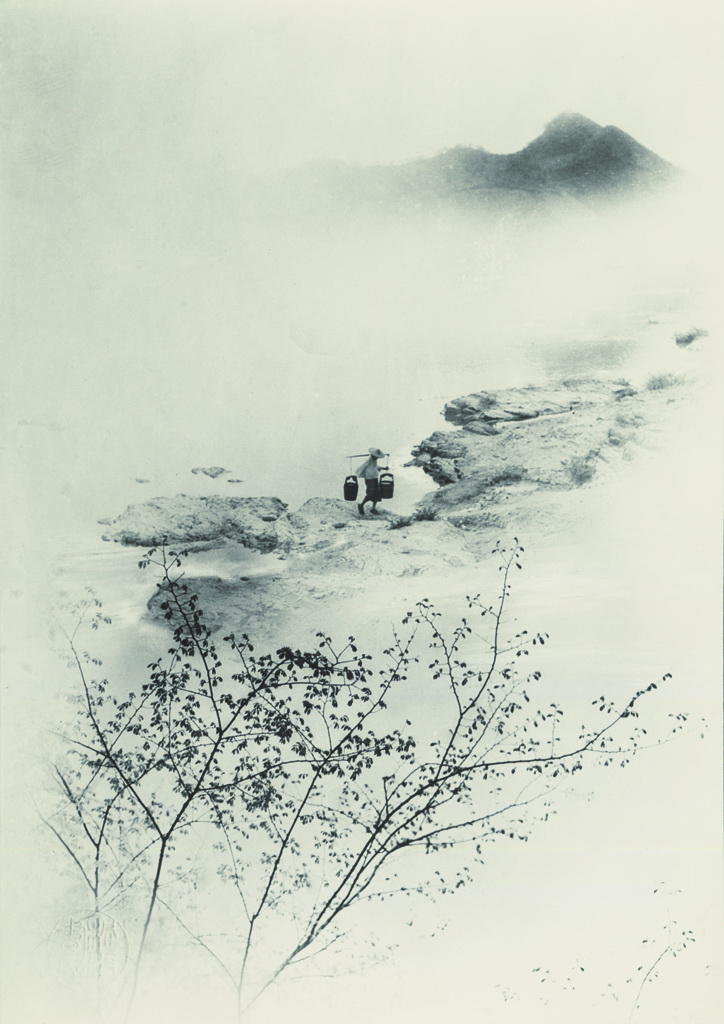
Drawing Water from the River at Dawn, 1934

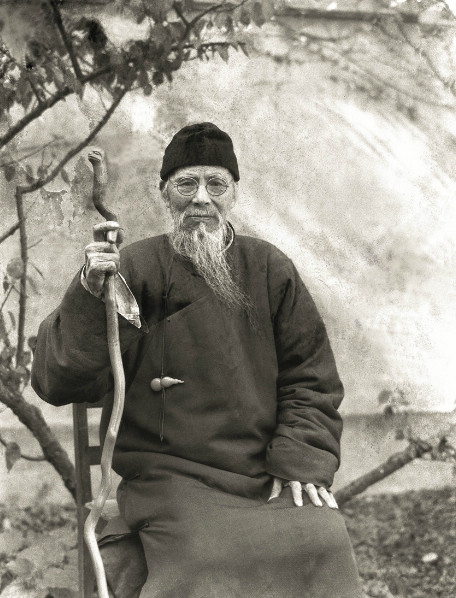
Portrait of Qi Baishi, 1930s

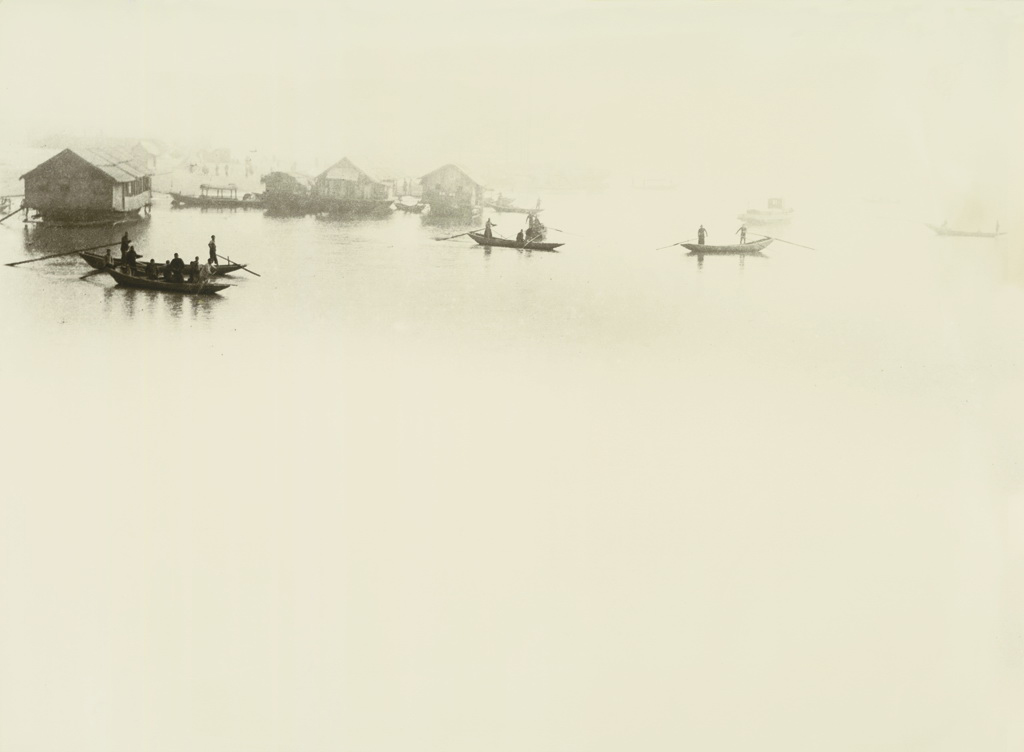
Mooring in the Misty River at Night, 1937

== See also ==
- Wang Wusheng

== References and further reading ==
- Lai, Kin-keung, Edwin. 黎健強, "The life and art photography of Lang Jingshan (1892–1995)," PhD Thesis, Fine Arts Department, The University of Hong Kong (Pokfulam, Hong Kong doi) (May be viewed for free by registering).
- Dikötter, Frank (2008). The Age of Openness: China Before Mao. University of California Press. ISBN 978-0-520-25881-5.
- Kent, Richard K (2013). "Early Twentieth-Century Art Photography in China: Adopting, Domesticating, and Embracing the Foreign". Local Culture/Global Photography. 3 (2). hdl:2027/spo.7977573.0003.204.
- Roberts, Claire (2012). Photography and China (Exposures). Durrington, UK: Reaktion Books. ISBN 9781861899118.
