= Hou Bo =

Chinese photographer (1924–2017)

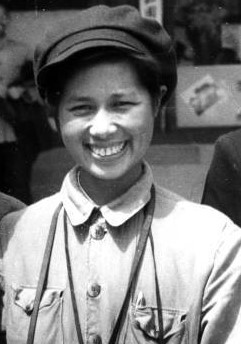
- Hou Bo in the 1940s
- Born: 17 September 1924; Xia County, Shanxi Province, Republic of China
- Died: 26 November 2017 (aged 93); Beijing, China
- Occupation: Photographer
- Political party: Communist
- Spouse: Xu Xiaobing (m. 1943; died 2009)
- Children: 2

Hou Bo (Chinese: 侯波; 17 September 1924 – 26 November 2017) was a Chinese photographer who, with her husband Xu Xiaobing, was among the best known photographers of Mao Zedong. Born into a poor peasant family, Hou Bo joined the Communist Party at the age of fourteen and learned photography during the Second Sino-Japanese War in order to present a better image of the Party's work to the world. After 1949, she and Xu Xiaobing lived in the same compound as Mao and took both official photos, some used for posters and publicity, which became the most widely circulated photos of Mao, and some family photos, taken informally behind the scenes.

Among her best known photographs are "The Founding of the PRC" (1949), "Mao Zedong Swimming Across the Yangzi" (1955), "Chairman Mao at Work in an Airplane" (1959), and "Mao Zedong with Students from Latin America" (1959), which won First Prize in the National Photography Exhibition of 1959.

== Early life ==
Hou Bo was born in September 1924 in Xia County, Shanxi Province, and was from a poor peasant background. She joined the Chinese Communist Party at 14. Her father, a laborer, was beaten to death by factory owner who refused to pay him, and her mother died of grief soon after. When she made her way to Yan'an, she finished school and enrolled in the Anti-Japanese Military and Politics University, where she studied politics.

She and her future husband, Xu Xiaobing, then a PLA photographer, met in Yan'an in early 1942 and he introduced her to photography. They married in the spring of 1943. Hou Bo later recalled, "About 10 friends gathered with us in our cave; we bought jujubes and dried buns, and we all sang together". Work assignments separated the couple for long periods of time, but Hou studied photography with Japanese prisoners. In January 1949, when the PLA entered Beiping, Hou and Xu were reunited in Mao's summer house in his Fragrant Hills temporary headquarters outside the city where Xu was photographing Mao's meetings with foreign delegations. Mao took an interest in Hou Bo, asking where she came from, and saying that she "grew up on the millet of Yan'an, so you must serve the people." Mao asked her to join his group of official photographers. Hou's photo of Mao and other new leaders on 1 October 1949, proclaiming the founding of the People's Republic of China is one of the most widely distributed photographs of modern times, but she also took less formal pictures of the leadership. She later recalled that when, "after all present sang the national anthem, Chairman Mao solemnly declared the founding of new China, I felt so exhilarated that I forgot about the danger and leaned as far out from the rostrum guardrails as I could and took a photo of Chairman Mao as he declared the rising of the new nation."

== After 1949 ==
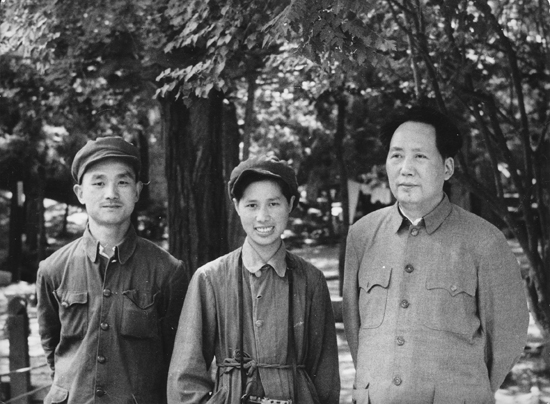
Xu Xiaobing, Hou Bo, Mao Zedong Fragrant Hills, 1949

From 1950 to 1961, Hou Bo lived in the Zhongnanhai, the residence of top party officials, where she set up the Photography Department. She was joined by her husband and two children, who were reared in the Party nursery there. Mao's children called her "Aunt Hou Bo." By one count, although she was the only woman on the film crew, Hou Bo took more than 400 of the 700 officially published photographs of Mao in this period. She and Xu Xiaobo became, as one China watcher put it, "court photographers" who took photos both of Mao in "Stalinesque" poses that became famous propaganda posters, and also relaxed pictures of him with his family, some on the beach at Beidaihe. Her assignment was to make a photographic record not only of Mao, but of Central Committee members including Zhou Enlai, Zhu De, and Liu Shaoqi. She travelled with these officials and often caught them in unguarded moments, such as "Chairman Mao at Work on an Aeroplane" (1957), which showed him intent on reading a document. These personal photos were not circulated to the public or the press; one print of each was for Zhongnanhai and one for the archive.

Hou Bo had a mixed relation with Mao's wife, Jiang Qing, who pursued photography as an avid amateur and had Hou Bo transferred from Zhongnanhai to New China News Agency in 1961. When she left Zhongnanhai, however, she recalled later, Mao told her "For 12 years, you took a lot of very good pictures of me". During the Cultural Revolution, Jiang Qing attacked Hou. "She said I was a fake communist, because I had joined when I was 14 even though the official age was 18," Hou said in a 2009 interview. "And she said the fact I had photographed disgraced figures like Liu Shaoqi meant I was definitely a counter-revolutionary. I hate her, but she did what she believed in".

== Later years ==
In their later years, she and her husband also received recognition outside China. They were the subjects of a documentary film, Hou Bo et Xu Xiaobing, photographes de Mao (Claude Hudelot et Jean-Michel Vecchiet, 2003, 52 mins), and an exhibition of their photographs of Mao was presented at the Photographers' Gallery, London, during April and May 2004.

After her husband's death in 2009 she noted that she was still a communist and an admirer of Mao Zedong's legacy. She said that she and her husband were "just ordinary workers who gave our lives for the foundation of a new China." Mao made mistakes in the Cultural Revolution, and "everyone's life was hard, but so was his. China was very poor, and he made a big contribution to provide a foundation for our country to be great." She died on 26 November 2017, aged 93.

== Legacy and reputation ==
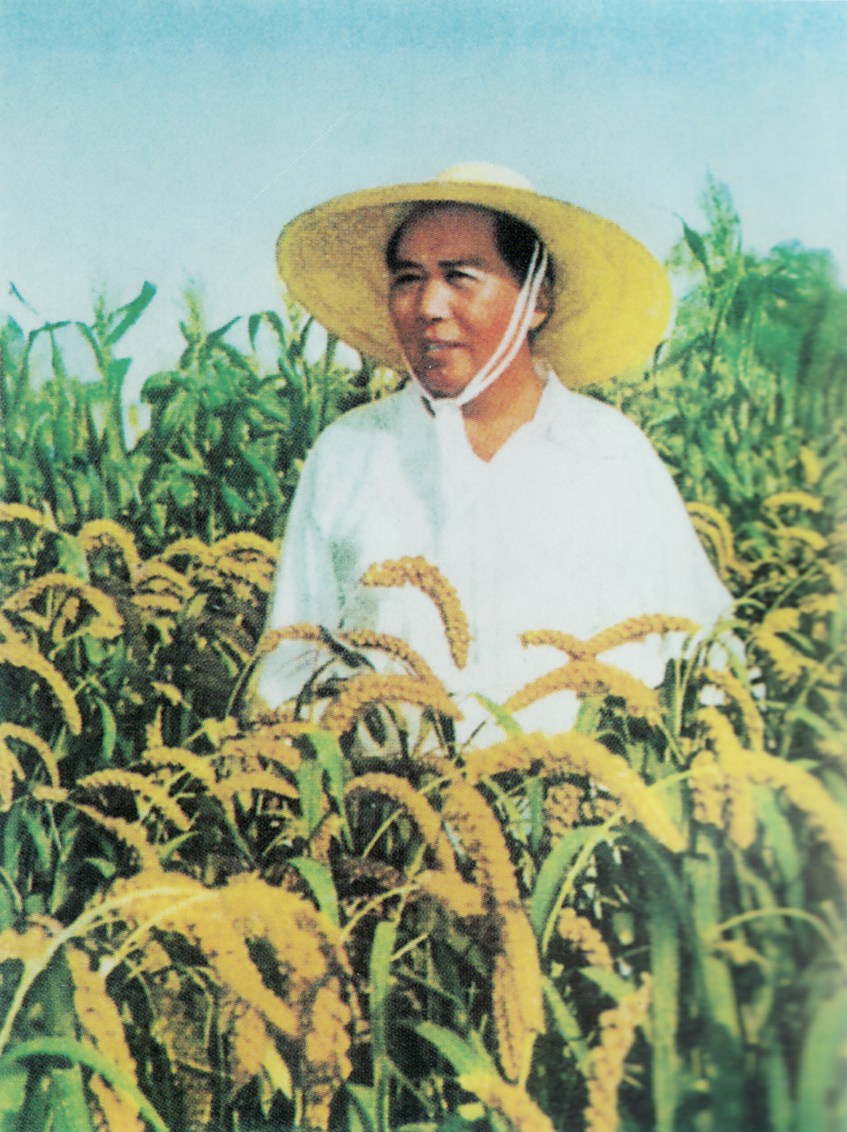
Mao Zedong in a rice field. Poster based on a photo by Hou Bo

The critic Claude Hudelot remarks that the widely circulated poster of Mao in the midst of a rice field, taken from Hou's photo, shows that Hou's farm background made her comfortable among China's cultures, where she "immersed herself with an almost childlike joy". She shows Mao wearing a straw hat that "seems to accentuate the effect of an Emperor of Nature, radiating rays of sunlight". Her photography explored deeper into the history of Mao Zedong, as well as attempt to highlight and depict the features of his image that made him a historical leader in Chinese history. The poster was issued in millions of copies in 1958, just at the start of the eventually devastating Great Leap Forward.

The Taiwan photographer Zhang Zhaotang said when an exhibition of Hou and Xu's photos reached Taiwan, "As an official photographer, Hou has managed to avoid showing rigid and affected postures; she's given her subject a natural and vivid shot, thanks to her diligence and perseverance"
