= Bessatsu Atorie Atarashii Shashin =

1957 Japanese special issue of Bessatsu Atorie

Bessatsu Atorie Atarashii Shashin (Japanese: 別冊アトリエ 新しい写真), published with the English cover title Subjective Photography, was the 34th issue of the Japanese periodical Bessatsu Atorie, issued by Atorie Shuppansha on 20 May 1957. The cover also bears the English line "A Collection of Subjective Photography in 1957 Japan: 130 Works by 29 Modern Photographers: A Special Number Atelier". The issue includes an essay by Shūzō Takiguchi, a round-table discussion among Nobuya Abe, Nobuo Ina, and Yōnosuke Natori, and a section of commentary and technical data on the work of 29 photographers.

The issue appeared in the context of the mid-1950s rise of subjective photography in Japan, following the domestic reception of Otto Steinert's Subjektive Fotografie and the formation of the Japan Subjective Photography League, in whose founding Shūzō Takiguchi, Nobuya Abe, and Kansuke Yamamoto participated.

== Background ==
The issue has been situated within postwar debates over subjective photography in Japan. In the opening essay, 「写真の表現について」 ("On photographic expression"), Takiguchi cautions against reducing photography to simple oppositions such as subjective versus objective or reportage versus formal construction, and argues instead for a broader understanding of photographic expression. Later scholarship has placed the issue within the same postwar current that led to the formation of the Japan Subjective Photography League in 1956 and the First International Subjective Photography Exhibition later that year.

== Contents ==
According to the issue's front matter, its contents were as follows:

- color plates by Nobuya Abe, Keiichirō Gotō, and Hisae Imai
- Takiguchi's essay 「写真の表現について」
- the round-table discussion 「新しい写真を語る」 ("Discussing new photography")
- a concluding section of commentary and technical data on the works of the participating photographers

== Contributing photographers ==
The issue presents 130 works by 29 photographers.

- Nobuya Abe
- Eiichi Akaho
- Keiichirō Gotō
- Tadao Higuchi
- Kōrō Honjō
- Hisae Imai
- Gorō Ike
- Yasuhiro Ishimoto
- Takeji Iwamiya
- Rokurō Kariya
- Tetsuya Ichimura
- Shōzō Kitadai
- Itaru Koshida
- Shizuo Matsuda
- Kōichi Mise
- Ikkō Narahara
- Kiyoshi Niiyama
- Kaoru Ōfuji
- Shigeru Onishi
- Mitsuo Otonari
- Kiyoji Ōtsuji
- Gen Ōtsuka
- Kōichi Sako
- Tsune Sugimura
- Noboru Ueki
- Tsuyoshi Ueda
- Shōji Ueda
- Kansuke Yamamoto
- Hitori Yoshizaki

== Round-table discussion ==
The round-table discussion 「新しい写真を語る」 was conducted by Nobuya Abe, Nobuo Ina, and Yōnosuke Natori. It traces the genealogy of postwar "new photography" in Japan through the reception of the Bauhaus, László Moholy-Nagy, Man Ray, Albert Renger-Patzsch, Japanese New Photography, and the relationship between prewar avant-garde photography and postwar realism.

Figures explicitly discussed in the round-table include Takiguchi, Moholy-Nagy, Man Ray, Renger-Patzsch, Sen'ichi Kimura, Franz Roh, Hajime Yamada, Iwata Nakayama, Bizan Ueda, Nakaji Yasui, Kanbei Hanaya, Christian Schad, Kazimir Malevich, Walter Gropius, Paul Klee, Piet Mondrian, Theo van Doesburg, Wassily Kandinsky, J. J. P. Oud, John Reed, Egon Erwin Kisch, Grosz, Canoldt, Weis, Isshū Nagata, Kiyoshi Koishi, Hiroshi Hamaya, André Masson, Gustave Courbet, Edward Weston, André Kertész, Marie Eborl, Edward Steichen, Tarō Okamoto, Yūshi Kobayashi, Noboru Ueki, Keiichirō Gotō, and Kansuke Yamamoto.

The illustrations and captions accompanying the round-table also mention Hiroshi Hamaya, Nakaji Yasui, Osamu Shiihara, Shisui Tanahashi, Bizan Ueda, Kōrō Honjō, Gingo Hanawa, Isshū Nagata, Kiyoshi Koishi, Kimitoshi Ikeda, Tsugio Tajima, Yoshio Shimozato, Minoru Sakata, Yoshifumi Abe, Tarō Sawano, and Yoshinori Tanaka.

Near the end of the discussion, Abe recalls a postwar special issue that gathered surviving prewar avant-garde photographers and names Kansuke Yamamoto, Yūshi Kobayashi, Noboru Ueki, and Keiichirō Gotō among its participants.

== Historical position ==
Ryūichi Kaneko has argued that the importance of Bessatsu Atorie Atarashii Shashin lies not only in its documentation of postwar subjective photography, but also in the way it briefly brought prewar avant-garde photographers and younger postwar practitioners together in the same printed forum. In Kaneko's account, the issue juxtaposed prewar avant-garde figures such as Kansuke Yamamoto, Nobuya Abe, Kōrō Honjō, and Hitori Yoshizaki with younger postwar photographers including Kiyoji Ōtsuji, Ikkō Narahara, Hisae Imai, and Yasuhiro Ishimoto. For that reason, the issue has been discussed as a point of intersection in print between prewar experimental photography and the postwar rearticulation of avant-garde practice in Japan.

== Holdings and later exhibitions ==
Major institutional holdings listed in CiNii Books include the library of the Tokyo Photographic Art Museum, Kyoto University, Tohoku University, Waseda University, and Ritsumeikan University.

In 2023, material from the issue was exhibited in "Avant-Garde" Photography: The Transformation of the Ordinary at the Toyama Prefectural Museum of Art and Design. The same material was also recorded as a magazine clipping in the annual report for the 2023-2024 exhibition of the same title at the Shoto Museum of Art.

== See also ==
- Japan Subjective Photography League
- Kansuke Yamamoto (artist)
- Shūzō Takiguchi
