= Gen Ōtsuka =

Japanese photographer

Gen Otsuka
- Born: May 10, 1912; Tokyo, Japan
- Died: 1992 (aged 79–80)
- Education: Ueno Art College
- Movement: Japanese Modern Photography

Gen Ōtsuka (大束 元, Ōtsuka Gen; 1912-1992) was a renowned Japanese photographer.

He was born on May 10, 1912, in the Kita ward in Tokyo, Japan. His father, Otsuka Masayoshi, was a pioneer of photographic retouching. After graduating secondary school in 1929, his father encouraged him to study photography at Tokyo Industrial Arts High School (currently part of Chiba University). He graduated in 1933.

Otsuka was a photographer who worked in various photographic styles. He was not tethered to specific photographic techniques or motifs. He was a leader in the Tokyo-based photojournalism that focused on social issues. But he was also a well established portrait photographer. He worked for the Asahi Newspaper.

== Father's Influence ==
Otsuka Gen was born in Tokyo, but his father, Masayoshi, was originally from the town of Toyotsu in Fukuoka prefecture. The family in Toyotsu owned a coal mine, so Masayoshi grew up privileged and entered Ueno Art College in Tokyo to pursue his artistic ambitions. But during University, the family's coal mine was destroyed due to a natural disaster that financially ruined the family, forcing Masayoshi to begin working as an art teacher soon after graduating. Forced to give up his ambitions as a painter, Masayoshi picked up photography and taught himself photo development and retouching techniques, which he later taught at the Tokyo Photography Academy.

Gen grew up in a home full of photographic equipment with a darkroom. As Masayoshi would work on retouching photographs using cutting-edge techniques, he forced Gen to help. He would have to hand pump the pressure for the air-brushing that his father would do, and he hated it.

Gen was interested in dance when he was younger and often went to Takarazuka performances. Still, his father would not allow him to pursue it and forced him to enroll as a photography student at the Tokyo Industrial Art High School in 1929. During his student days as one of the six photography students in his class, he began working for many different clients as the demand for photographic skills increased. The Mainichi Newspaper commissioned Gen to take face shots for Mainichi Newspaper. Through his father's various connections in the burgeoning photography societies, Gen found employment at the Asahi newspaper when he graduated in 1933.

== Influence of Koga Meetings ==
As a student, he had the opportunity to join meetings held by members who founded the photography magazine, Koga, like Ihee Kimura, Iwata Nakayama, and Yasuzo Nojima. Although he was young, these older photographers recognized his developing talent. The magazine included some of his work.

Other members included Hiromu Hara, Hikaru Yamanouchi, Koji Nishikigori, Tomizo Yoshikawa, and critics such as Takoho Tagaki, Nyozenkan Hasegawa, and Muneyoshi Yanagi.

At these meetings, 20 or so photographers would come together and share photos. The participants would often have intense debates about the modernity of their photographs. As the youngest regular member of the group, the lively egalitarian environment of open discussions heavily influenced him. There was an incident that was indicative of that egalitarian spirit. A photo of a puppet lying on a table that Otsuka took sparked a fierce debate between Kimura Ihee and Nobuo Ina. Ihee said that the photograph was blurry and reprimanded Otsuka for presenting such a photo to the group. Ina defended Otsuka's photo saying that the blurriness was the photograph's tone. The debate did not abate until days later, and Kimura apologized to Otsuka's father, Masayoshi, for criticizing Otsuka's photograph.

Otsuka said about these meetings: “Everyone was in earnest, and said exactly what they felt. Seniority counted for nothing. At that time, a student like myself would normally have been expected to remain silent in such company, but no one there ignored me, and I could speak out whenever I wanted to. There was never any master/pupil kind of atmosphere, no condescension – which is how it should be, since a good photo is a good photo no matter who took it.”

Although many of these members diverged stylistically from each other in the future, the Koga meetings were essential to modern Japanese photography. The experience profoundly influenced him as a photographer and the various styles and techniques he employed throughout his long career.

== Early career ==
Although Otsuka had been promised employment at the Asahi newspaper upon graduation, the newspaper told him that he would have to wait and that he would have to find a temporary job. He decided to create a small photography studio named Ginza Commercial Photography Research Center with his friends, including Ryukichi Shibuya. It was there that they developed a technique for making life-size prints of human models for department store advertisements, as mannequins were not yet widely used at the time. Ostuka struck gold as he became flooded with orders from various department stores; he became so busy that he had to hire students from Ueno Art College to help him.

A year later, Otsuka finally joined Asahi in 1934 and was sent to the company's Osaka branch. He was posted not as a photographer but as a reporter in the social affairs department. There, he learned to write news stories and take documentary photographs. He never used a staff photographer and covered various topics such as police, general interest, army-related, and travel stories. But only a few years into his career as a reporter, the Second Sino-Japanese war began.

== War years ==
During the war, Otsuka traveled all over China for 55 months. He had several series about the everyday life of Chinese people, like Here and there along the Yangtze and Autumn on the Continent. He wrote many stories of his own volition and avoided battlefronts when possible, unlike his contemporaries. However, it is not clear if he was viewed suspiciously by the Japanese military police, who detained Otsuka for two nights. They questioned him about the content of his reporting and his lack of coverage of the war efforts, although they let him go after he promised to change his ways.

In 1942, Otsuka was transferred to the Asahi Bangkok branch going to Saigon briefly before being sent to Singapore and finally Seoul in 1944, where he taught photographic and darkroom techniques to the staff of Mainichi Shinpo. But as American B-29s began to bomb Japan in 1945, he returned to Osaka. He was ordered to join a reconnaissance squad using the Shinshitei, Mitsubishi Ki-46 reconnaissance plane, to chase, photograph, and identify American bombers. These agile planes would climb up to 10,000 meters to photograph the B-29s, often drawing fire.

He said: “It was highly unusual for a civilian like myself to be involved in such work, but in those days, the army could do whatever it wanted. I learned that I had been chosen because I was the lightest photographer the army could find. The Shinshitei was made to carry only two people, the pilot, and the squad leader, and so if they wanted to carry another person, they needed someone light… It was, for all intents and purposes, a draft order."

As the strategic bombing of Japan shifted to napalm carpet bombing, Otsuka would watch the scene from above as cities were engulfed in flames. His parents, who had escaped to Wakayama, died in these fires. Even after his parents' death, he took pictures of the cities that burned from the nightly air raids. Reflecting on his ability to continue to take photographs despite his tragedy and the national tragedy unfolding, photography critic Teruo Okai said:

In my mind, this response reflects Otsuka’s ability, even when finding himself in the thick of the action, to distance himself from the war enough to view it with the objectivity of an impartial observer, an ability born out of his unyielding thirst for the truth, his insistence at all times on distilling the essence behind any given scene or situation. Therefore, he allowed himself, despite being fully away from the suffering going on below, to shudder at the sheer beauty of the conflagration. Becoming one with his camera, he accepted without judgment whatever impression the spectacle made on his senses.

== Post-war period ==
In 1945, Otsuka was promoted to deputy chief of the Photograph Department of the Asahi Osaka office. In 1948 he was sent to Tokyo as deputy chief of Asahi's Publications Photography Department.

During these years, he continued his photography. He covered Osaka's post-war recovery effort and did stage photography, taking pictures of the Tokyo Ballet and Komaki Ballet companies. He took photographs of the various European performers that visited Japan. He also photographed Emperor Hirohito’s visit to Osaka and other cultural events such as the Koshien high school baseball tournament.

When the Asahi Camera photography magazine restarted publication after the war in 1949, Otsuka worked with the magazine. This collaboration was radical at the time, as many newspaper photographers would have considered it a blow to their ego to stoop down and present their photographs on the same pages as amateurs. Ihee Kimura was the editorial advisor, and the magazine began to include works by foreign photographers and have columns on the latest global photography trends. Photographers such as Shoji Otake, Jun Miki, Takamasa Inamura, and Shotaro Akiyama featured prominently.

Otsuka's photographic production picked up pace during these years. In addition to his newspaper photographs, he took portraits and street photographs that captured the reality of post-war Japan, focusing on images that captured social trends and phenomena. He was also among the photographers included in Bessatsu Atorie Atarashii Shashin in 1957, a special issue that later scholarship has placed within postwar debates over subjective photography in Japan and that Ryūichi Kaneko described as a printed forum in which prewar avant-garde figures such as Kansuke Yamamoto intersected with younger postwar photographers including Kiyoji Ōtsuji, Ikkō Narahara, Hisae Imai, and Yasuhiro Ishimoto. His reputation only grew as he became the chief administrator of the All Japan Association of Photographic Societies, which was the largest organization for amateur photographers in 1958, and participated as a judge in various photography competitions.

=== Permanent collections ===
Museum Modern of Art (MoMA), New York, United States

J. Paul Getty Museum, Los Angeles, United States

Tokyo Photographic Art Museum, Tokyo, Japan
