= Shigeru Onishi =

Japanese visual artist (1928–1994)

- Born: November 2, 1928; Japan, Takahashi, Okayama Prefecture
- Died: December 2, 1994 (aged 66); Japan, Okayama, Okayama Prefecture
- Education: Takahashi High School→ Six Higher School→ Hokkaido University
- Alma mater: Hokkaido University
- Occupation: Visual artist

Shigeru Onishi (Japanese: 大西茂, Onishi Shigeru, November 2, 1928 – December 2, 1994) was a Japanese visual artist. Onishi produced photography-based work and abstract ink paintings. Michel Tapié introduced Onishi's calligraphic works to Europe with works by the Gutai group artists in the context of the Art Informel movement. These calligraphic works used the sumi method that Japanese painters traditionally use from ink made from soot or oil and animal glue.

He started his artistic career as photographer in 1950 and gradually shifted to abstract ink painting. Although he was a self-educated photographer, he was very familiar with various photographic and photo development techniques. He worked with multiple exposure, development processing with brushes and sponges, discoloration using developing agents, film processing, color tone manipulation using temperature, and other methods. These techniques would often achieve experimental results.

== Biography ==
=== Early life ===
Onishi was born in Takahashi City in Okayama prefecture, Japan. During his time at Okayama Prefectural Takahashi High School, focusing on mathematics and the sciences, he was friends with his classmate Tadao Ogura. After graduating from the high school, he witnessed the end of the war. He then attended the Sixth Higher School in Okayama city before enrolling at Hokkaido University. In a photography magazine introducing Onishi's work, his friend, Tadao Ogura, stated that Onishi showed no interest in his studies, other than two or three subjects. While the students hurried towards the examination centers, he went in the opposite direction to go hiking. Ogura also mentioned that Onishi became interested in divination and created his own system. Onishi was so precocious that he often stumped his philosophy teacher and would stand at the lectern himself to explain difficult topics.

=== University days ===
Onishi entered Hokkaido University to study topology and graduated in 1953. He stayed in Hokkaido to continue his studies in mathematics until 1958 while he worked on his theoretical mathematical treatise, A Study of Meta-Infinite, which can also be considered his life work. Around this time, Onishi began photography to convey his mathematical theories in art. He also scribbled dozens of abstract sketches in red ink every day.

According to Michel Tapié, Onishi was a Buddhist. After graduating from University, Onishi spent time at a Zen temple where he began to work with traditional Japanese sumi ink. His experimental photography and ink painting both started during his time in Hokkaido.

== Artistic career ==
=== Early experimental photographic works 1955–1957 ===
In 1955, Onishi exhibited his first one-person show at Nabis Gallery in Tokyo. In the exhibition pamphlet, he explains that he "used multiple exposure, solarization, and other various techniques… There are some works for which I barely relied on the camera lens." The exhibition pamphlet also includes written contributions from Shuzo Takiguchi and Shigene Kanamaru. At the time, his experimental photographs shocked viewers. Tatsuo Fukushima, a prominent photography critic, wrote:

Shigeru Onishi is one of those photographers whose work boldly strikes me with the unease and anguish of an individual living through our times. While his work aggressively takes a stand against all that harms and injures us, I also felt it issues a warning to our tamed souls, which, when confronted with such harmful things, tend to try and proceed by forgetting, evading, deceiving. His photographs shock our numbed souls and teach them to hate that which is hateful. The force they display – the opposite of what we see in the more accommodating salons – could not be more important for this society.

In March 1957, Takemiya Gallery in Tokyo held Onishi's second one-person show. It was titled The Second Shigeru Onishi Photography Exhibition and organized by Takiguchi. In an essay for this show, Onishi wrote that the goal of his photography was "to know the conditions of the subject's formation founded on a desire to pursue such metamathematical propositions such as the 'possibility of existence' and 'the possibility of arbitrary work'” He was deeply committed to his pursuit of photography through the lens of mathematics.

=== Connections to the Subjective Photography Movement 1956–1958 ===
In 1956, his works were presented in a traveling exhibition organized by Sankei Camera held at the Nihonbashi Takashimaya department store in Tokyo, titled The First International Subjective Photography Exhibition. Held in the same year that the newly founded Japan Subjective Photography League was established, the show focused on the Subjektive Fotografie movement initiated by the German photographer Otto Steinert and brought together Japanese artists including Onishi, prewar avant-garde figures such as Kansuke Yamamoto, and emerging postwar photographers including Kiyoji Ōtsuji, Ikkō Narahara, and Yasuhiro Ishimoto. One year after the exhibition, Onishi's photographs were introduced in a special feature for Subjectivist photographers with other major artists in the movement, such as Kōichi Sako.

In March 1958, Onishi participated in the Japanese Subjective Photography exhibition at the Fuji Photo Salon in Tokyo, organized by the Japan Subjective Photography League.

=== Connections to Gutai 1957–1961 ===
At this point in his career, Onishi shifted his artistic focus because he felt the mathematical propositions fundamental to him were beyond the scope of photography. He continued his theoretical mathematical treatise, but his artistic production shifted to large-scale abstract ink paintings.

Around this time, he became acquaintances with the French critic Michel Tapié who was involved with the Gutai group. Onishi participated in several shows that the Gutai group hosted through this relationship. In 1957, Contemporary World Art, an international exhibition curated by Tapié, featured Onishi's abstract ink paintings. The show focused on Art Informel and was first exhibited at the Bridgestone Museum of Art in Tokyo, and later at the Daimaru Department Store in Osaka. In 1958, he participated in the Osaka International Festival—The International Art of a New Era: Informel and Gutai, first exhibited in Osaka and later toured to Nagasaki, Hiroshima, Tokyo, and Kyoto. In 1959, he appeared in the Fifteen Japanese Contemporary Artists Recommended by Tapié at Gendai Gallery in Tokyo.

After meeting Tapié, Onishi's works made their first appearance in an exhibition outside Japan in late 1959. The Galerie Stadler in Paris featured his work in an exhibition titled METAMORPHISMES. Rodolphe Stadler opened the gallery in October 1955 and hired Tapié as an artistic advisor.

In May to June 1959, Onishi's work was presented at the exhibition Arte Nuova: Esposizione Internazionale di Pittura e Scultura ("New Art: International Exhibition of Painting and Sculpture") at the Palazzo Graneri in Turin, Italy.

In March 1961, he was included in an exhibition titled Continuité et avant-garde au Japon (“Continuity and the avant-garde in Japan”). The show was held at the now-closed International Center of Aesthetic Research in Turin, which Tapié cofounded.

Although Onishi was featured in several shows with the Gutai group and had many connections to Tapié, it appears that he was never a full member of the Gutai group.

=== Exhibitions shift to Europe 1960s–1990s ===
In April 1960, he had a solo exhibition at Gendai Gallery in Tokyo. This show focusing on his calligraphic works would be his last exhibition in Japan for 20 years. A review by the art critic, Yusuke Nakahara, titled “Intelligent compositions: Shigeru Onishi’s explorations of the possibilities of ink," appeared in the Yomiuri Shimbun newspaper. In it, Nakahara differentiates Onishi's calligraphic work from other typical Japanese calligraphic work. Nakahara states:

Onishi's works are expressed in ink, but they create a disparate world from modernist calligraphy. This departure is probably because the artist is deeply familiar with the limitations and possibilities of ink as a material. The world he creates results from his devotion to his singular vision. Onishi’s uniqueness comes from his confluent spatial expression influenced by the streaking subtly shaded lines of the sumi ink. The composition is purified and intellectual. Compared to this, his inner dramatic power is relegated to the background.

In 1961, a large-format catalog of Onishi's artworks was published by Edizioni d’Arte Fratelli Pozzo in Turin, entitled Onishi (Baroques Ensemblistes 5). And in March of the same year, he is included in an exhibition at the International Center of Aesthetic Research in Turin, titled Continuité et avant-garde au Japon (“Continuity and the avant-garde in Japan”).

In 1969, the International Center of Aesthetic Research, founded by Tapié, published Onishi's first monograph, titled A Study of Meta-Infinite: Logic of Continuum (1). It is noteworthy because Onishi's theoretical treatise fills the pages of the monograph. The following year, Orangerie Multiples in Cologne published his collected theoretical writings, Super Function Theory.

Although Onishi's abstract ink paintings were widely exhibited and published from the 1950s to the 1970s throughout Europe, he did not keep the company of international art circles. In Europe, his abstract calligraphic works were well received, but his earlier photographic works were largely ignored.

Over the years, critics tried to tie Onishi to many artistic movements, but Onishi never associated himself with any specific movement. He did not join Gutai though heavily involved with Tapié, and he shifted away from photography, so he was never fully engaged in the subjective photography movement. Onishi stayed in Okayama and continued to work on his primary endeavor, his mathematical research, until his death in 1994.

From the late 70s into the 90s, his calligraphic works and In Search for the Meta-Infinite were included in group shows at the Nara Prefectural Museum of Art, Okayama Cultural Center, and the National Museum of Art, Osaka.

In an introductory essay Tapié wrote for A Study of the Meta-Infinite, Tapié describes a personal episode when he met Onishi for Osaka's International Sky Festival in 1960. When Onishi arrived in Osaka, he was so excited to see Tapié and explain his new mathematical discoveries that the translator couldn't keep up with his highly specialized vocabulary borrowed from French, English, and German. Tapié recalls Onishi's passion captivated him.

=== Posthumous career ===
After Onishi died in Okayama city in 1994, his body of work was consigned to two different parties. The Onishi estate consigned his paintings to the Okayama Prefectural Museum of Art, and they consigned his photographic works to Ryuichi Kaneko, a photo historian and curator at the TOP Museum (formerly known as: Tokyo Metropolitan Museum of Photography). In 2014, Kaneko, a prolific photobook collector and researcher, curated an solo exhibition focusing on Onishi's photographic works, titled Shigeru Onishi: Elusive Avant-Garde Photographer at Galarie Omotesando in Tokyo.

In 2017, MEM, a Tokyo-based gallery, held a solo exhibition of Onishi's photographic works at their booth at Paris Photo. Although Onishi's calligraphic paintings had been shown internationally through his connections with Tapié in Europe, this 2017 exhibition at Paris Photo was the first time that Onishi's photographic works were shown to an international audience. This became the launching pad for the reevaluation of Onishi's career as a painter and a mathematician through the lens of his career as a photographer.

This exhibition rekindled international interest in his work. His photographic works are then absorbed into collections at MoMA, New York Public Library, and the Bombas Gens Centre d'Art, València. His photographic works are featured in the group exhibition Collection 1940s–1970s, 409 AbstractLens at MoMA in New York City from 2019 to 2020 for the first show inaugurating the reopening of the museum after its large-scale renovation. He was then featured in his first solo museum exhibition outside of Japan at Foam Photography Museum, Amsterdam, and the Bombas Gens Centre d'Art, València from 2021 to 2023.

In 2021, Steidl published the first monograph on Onishi's photographic works titled A Metamathematical Proposition, which was designed and edited by Manfred Heiting, a preeminent photography collector, researcher, and educator, in collaboration with MEM. The volume contains an essay by Ryuichi Kaneko in which he tries to position Onishi within the larger history of Japanese photography and modern photography, he writes:

Having blasted onto the photography scene in the late 1950s, Shigeru Onishi never found a place for himself there, despite being noticed by some critics and periodicals. And although he earned praise for the works he presented as part of the Informalism movement's glamorous worldwide activities, It is fair to say that his photographic output immediately preceding his transition to abstract ink has been almost totally overlooked... This may well be because he refused to situate his own creations within critical frameworks that fit their visual style or methods, such as Informalism or subjective photography… I am confident that his photography has the potential to reframe our historical understanding of post-war Japanese photography, and yet more, to deconstruct the very institution of modern photography.

In 2026, the Tokyo Station Gallery organized Onishi Shigeru: Photography and Painting, the artist’s first major museum retrospective in Japan, accompanied by an exhibition catalog that included essays by Mitsuhiro Wakayama, Stefano Turina, and Yoshiko Suzuki.

== Solo exhibitions ==
- 1955: The First Shigeru Onishi Photography Exhibition, Nabis Gallery, Tokyo, Japan
- 1957: The Second Shigeru Onishi Photography Exhibition, Takemiya Gallery, Tokyo, Japan
- 1960: Solo Exhibition, Gendai Gallery, Tokyo, Japan
- 2014: Shigeru Onishi: Elusive Avant-Garde Photographer, Galerie Omotesando, Tokyo, Japan
- 2021-2022: Shigeru Onishi: The Possibility of Existence, Foam Fotografiemuseum Amsterdam, Amsterdam, Netherlands
- 2022–2023: Shigeru Onishi: In Search of Meta-Infinite, Bombas Gens Centre d'Art, València, Spain
- 2026: Onishi Shigeru: Photography and Painting, Tokyo Station Gallery

== Group exhibitions ==
- 1956: The First International Subjective Photography Exhibition, Nihonbashi Takashimaya Department Store, Tokyo, Japan
- 1957: Contemporary World Art, Bridgestone Museum of Art, Tokyo, Japan
- 1957: Contemporary World Art, Daimaru Department Store, Osaka, Japan
- 1958: Osaka International Festival—The International Art of a New Era, Informel and Gutai, Namba Takashimaya Department Store, Osaka, Japan
- 1958: Japanese Subjective Photography, Fuji Photo Salon, Tokyo, Japan
- 1959: Arte Nuova: Esposizione Internazionale di Pittura e Scultura (“New Art: International Exhibition of Painting and Sculpture”), Palazzo Graneri, Turin, Italy
- 1959: Fifteen Japanese Contemporary Artists Recommended by Tapie, Gendai Gallery, Tokyo, Japan
- 1959: MÉTAMORPHISMES, Galerie Stadler, Paris, France
- 1960: International Sky Festival, Namba Takashimaya Department Store, Osaka, Japan
- 1961: Continuité et avant-garde au Japon (“Continuity and the avant-garde in Japan”). International Center of Aesthetic Research, Turin, Italy
- 1962: Strutture e Stile. Pitture e sculture di 42 artisti d’Europa, America e Giappone (“Structures and Style: Paintings and Sculptures by 42 Artists from Europe, America, and Japan”), Galleria Civica d’Arte Moderna, Turin, Italy
- 1964: Intuiciones y realizaciones formales (“Intuitions and Formalizations”), Centro de Artes Visuales, Instituto Torcuato Di Tella, Buenos Aires, Argentina
- 1964: Esposizione dei Pittori (“The Painters’ Exhibition”), International Center of Aesthetic Research, Turin, Italy
- 1965: Le baroque généralisé, International Center of Aesthetic Research, Turin, Italy
- 1969: Isologie–Homologie–Analogie : D'un esprit exact, d'un espace lyrique. D'un espace exact, d'un esprit lyrique. Serpan–Filhos–Onishi, Galerie Stadler, Paris, France
- 1973: Maîtres du Japon : Insho, Onishi, Suzuki, Teshigahara (“Masters of Japan: Insho, Onishi, Suzuki, Teshigahara”), Galerie Albert Verbeke, Paris, France
- 1977: Nihon no chūshō kaiga: Anforumeru o chūshin to shite (“Abstract Painting in Japan: With a Focus on Informalism”), Okayama Cultural Center, Okayama, Japan
- 1981: Ōhashi Kaichi korekushon kara: Gendai bijutsu no sekai (“From the Kaichi Ohashi Collection: The World of Contemporary Art”), Nara Prefectural Museum of Arts, Nara, Japan
- 1985: Action et emotion, peintures des années 50: Informel, Gutaï, Cobra (“Action and emotion, paintings of the ’50s: Informalism, Gutai, Cobra”), National Museum of Art, Osaka, Japan
- 1987: Recent Acquisitions 1985–6, The National Museum of Art, Osaka, Japan
- 1989: Kaiga to moji: Kakareta moji/kakareta e (“Painting and writing: lettering to be painted/painting to be written”), Hakodate Museum of Art, Hokkaido, Japan
- 1989: Sumi no sekai ten (“The World of Ink Exhibition”), Seibu Hall at the Otsu Seibu Department Store, Shiga, Japan
- 1992: Calligraphy and Painting: The Passionate Age: 1945–1969 at O Art Museum, Tokyo, Japan
- 1998: Aspects of Line, The National Museum of Art, Osaka, Japan
- 2000: Mirukoto no saihakken—Motto bijutsu o tanoshimu tameni (“Rediscovering the Act of Seeing—Getting More Enjoyment Out of Art”), Okayama Prefectural Museum of Art, Okayama, Japan
- 2002: Sengo Okayama no bijutsu: Zen’ei tachi no sugata (“Art in Postwar Okayama: The Pioneering Figures”), Okayama Prefectural Museum of Art, Okayama, Japan
- 2016: A Feverish Era: Art Informel and the Expansion of Japanese Artistic Expression in the 1950s and ’60s, The National Museum of Modern Art, Kyoto, Kyoto, Japan
- 2019: Japanese Nudes, Japan Museum SieboldHuis, Leiden, Netherlands
- 2019: Collection 1940s-1970s, The Museum of Modern Art, New York, United States
- 2026–2027: Light and Magic: The Birth of Art Photography, Tate Modern, UK, Photo SeMA, Seoul

== Selected public and private collections ==
- The National Museum of Modern Art, Kyoto (Kyoto)
- The National Museum of Art, Osaka (Osaka)
- Ohara Museum of Art (Kurashiki)
- Nara Prefectural Museum of Art (Nara)
- The Museum of Modern Art (New York)
- The New York Public Library (New York)
- Bombas Gens Centre d’Art (Valencia)
