= Tsune Sugimura =

Japanese photographer (1926–1991)

Tsune Sugimura (杉村 恒, Sugimura Tsune; 1926–1991) was a Japanese photographer. He was the author of 44 books, the most popular of which were Living Crafts of Okinawa (1973), which is a photographic documentary on traditional crafts from Okinawa, The Enduring Crafts of Japan (1968), and Hachijo: Isle of Exile (1973).

He was also among the photographers included in Bessatsu Atorie Atarashii Shashin, a 1957 special issue that Ryūichi Kaneko later described as a printed forum in which prewar avant-garde figures such as Kansuke Yamamoto briefly intersected with younger postwar photographers including Kiyoji Ōtsuji, Ikkō Narahara, Hisae Imai, and Yasuhiro Ishimoto.
