= Kōichi Sako =

Japanese photographer (1918-2010)

- Born: Yoshiura-cho Kure City, Japan
- Died: 2010

Kōichi Sako (1918-2010) was a Japanese photographer. Sako was born in Yoshiura-cho, Kure City, Hiroshima Prefecture.

When the atomic bomb fell on Hiroshima, he was 27 years old and working in Kure City. Although the bombing did not directly harm him, he was exposed to radiation when he entered Hiroshima city a few days later. He died in Hiroshima when he was 92 years old in 2010.

In 1952, Asahi Camera Yearbook published his Rural Family, and he began to contribute his photographs to various photography magazines and annuals actively. He also received instruction from Masaoka Kunio, a Chugoku Photographers Group member, and Akita Heihachiro, who had formed the Koyo Camera Club. In 1954, the newly established Nikakai Association of Photographers selected his work for the first time. He exhibited with them for 18 consecutive years until 1972. He also regularly contributed photographs to the avant-garde poetry coterie magazine VOU, which was presided over by the poet Katsué Kitasono.

Sako also wrote poetry. In his youth, he dreamt of becoming a poet but was inspired by the camera boom of the time, so he thought to use poetic imagery for his photographic expression. However, Sako realized later that photography and poetry are essentially two different forms of expression and began to search for an expression unique to photography. Based on the premise that merely realistically capturing the subject is not all there is to photography, he sought the realm of abstract expression.

In 1954, the subjektive fotografie 2 exhibition exhibited his Fushin. It was held in Saarbrücken, Germany, and Paris, France. Yusaku Kamekura first introduced the Subjective photography movement, first coined by German photographer Otto Steinert, to Japan in the May 1954 issue of Camera. Two years later, Shuzo Takiguchi and others founded the Japan Subjectivist Photography League, and the movement flourished. It was not limited to abstract, documentary, experimental techniques, or straight photography. It was based on individual subjectivity. At the time, Japan had been liberated from wartime repression of avant-garde artistic expression and found international support. Sako was one of the beneficiaries of the momentum of the Subjective photography movement. Five of his works were included in international exhibitions such as The Sense of Abstraction at the Museum of Modern Art in New York (1960).
