= Fujio =

- Gender: Male

Origin
- Origin: Japanese
- Meaning: Different meanings depending on the kanji used

Fujio (written: 正行, 藤雄, 藤夫, 不二夫, 富士雄, 冨士夫, 富士夫, 富士男, 希仁男 or ふじを, ふじお in hiragana) is a masculine Japanese given name. Notable people with the name include:

- Fujio Akatsuka (赤塚 不二夫; 1935–2008), Japanese manga artist
- Chiyoshōma Fujio (千代翔馬 富士雄; born 1991), Mongolian sumo wrestler
- Fujio Cho (張 富士夫; born 1937), Japanese businessman
- Fujio Imada (今田 富士雄), Japanese Deputy International Commissioner of the Scout Association of Japan
- Fujio Ishihara (石原 藤夫; born 1933), Japanese scientist and writer
- Fujio Ito (伊藤 富士夫; born 1945), Japanese cyclist
- Fujio Kakuta (角田 不二夫; 1911–1938), Japanese gymnast
- Fujio Kobayashi (小林 富士夫; born 1944), Japanese golfer
- Fujio Koyama (小山 富士夫; 1900-1975), Japanese scholar
- Fujio Masuoka (舛岡 富士雄; born 1943), Japanese inventor
- Fujio Matsuda (松田 富士夫; 1924–2020), Japanese American president of the University of Hawaii
- Fujio Matsugi (真継 不二夫; 1903–1984), Japanese photographer
- Fujio Mitarai (御手洗 冨士夫; born 1935), Japanese businessman
- Fujio Nagai (永井 希仁男; 1951–2007), Japanese boxer
- Fujio Noguchi (野口 富士男; 1911–1993), Japanese writer
- Fujio Shido (志度 藤雄; 1901–1986), Japanese chef
- Fujio Shimizu (清水 富士夫; born 1940), Japanese fencer
- Fujio Tamura (田村 藤夫; born 1959), Japanese Baseball catcher
- Fujio Watanabe (渡部 藤男; born 1939), Japanese former para table tennis player
- Fujio Yamamoto (山本 富士雄; born 1966), Japanese footballer
- Fujio Yoshida (吉田 ふじを; 1887–1987), Japanese artist

== Surname ==
- Fujiko Fujio (藤子 不二雄), Japanese manga writing duo
- Jerry Fujio (ジェリー藤尾; 1940–2021), Japanese singer, actor and tarento.
- Kaori Fujio (born 1981), Japanese field hockey player
- Masayuki Fujio (藤尾 正行; 1917–2006), Japanese politician
- Shota Fujio (藤尾 翔太; born 2001), Japanese footballer
