= Terushichi Hirai =

Japanese photographer

Terushichi Hirai (平井 輝七, Hirai Terushichi; 5 December 1900 – 11 December 1970) was one of the most prominent Japanese photographers in the first half of the 20th century in Japan.

As an amateur photographer, he was very energetic in photography groups, such as Naniwa Photography Club (浪華写真倶楽部, Naniwa Shashin Kurabu) and Tampei Photography Club.

In 1937, he founded Avant-Garde Image Group (Avant-Garde Zoei Shūdan, アヴァンギャルド造影集団) with Gingo Hanawa (1894–1957, 花和銀吾), Yoshio Tarui, Kōrō Honjō and Yoshifumi Hattori. The Osaka section of the 2022 Tokyo Photographic Art Museum exhibition Avant-Garde Rising: The Photographic Vanguard in Modern Japan situated the group within the Kansai avant-garde and included Hirai among its artists.

In 1956, Hirai also participated in the newly founded Japan Subjective Photography League and in the First International Subjective Photography Exhibition, which brought together prewar avant-garde figures such as Kansuke Yamamoto and Kōrō Honjō alongside emerging postwar photographers including Kiyoji Ōtsuji, Ikkō Narahara, and Yasuhiro Ishimoto.

He was good at imaginative, illusionary and surrealistic photography, using photomontages and color painting on prints. His works such as "Fantasies of the Moon" (月の夢想, 1938), "Mode" (1938, モード, Mōdo) and "Life" (1938, 生命, Seimei) are known among other important works for the history of Japanese photography before World War II.
