= Tadao Higuchi =

Japanese photographer

Tadao Higuchi (樋口 忠男, Higuchi Tadao; 1916 – 1992) was a renowned Japanese photographer.

He was among the photographers included in Bessatsu Atorie Atarashii Shashin, a 1957 special issue that Ryūichi Kaneko later described as a printed forum in which prewar avant-garde figures such as Kansuke Yamamoto intersected with a younger generation of postwar photographers, including Kiyoji Ōtsuji, Ikkō Narahara, Hisae Imai, and Yasuhiro Ishimoto.
