= Tadao =

- Gender: Male

Origin
- Origin: Japanese
- Meaning: Different meanings depending on the kanji used

Tadao (written: 忠雄, 忠夫, 忠男, 忠生, 忠郎 or 理男) is a masculine Japanese given name. Notable people with the name include:

- Tadao Ando (安藤 忠雄; born 1941), Japanese architect
- Aoyama Tadao (青山 忠雄; 1651–1685), Japanese daimyō
- Tadao Baba (馬場 忠雄; born 1944), Japanese motorcycle engineer
- Tadao Chino (千野 忠男; 1934–2008), Japanese banker
- Tadao Higuchi (樋口 忠男; 1916–1992), Japanese photographer
- Tadao Horie (堀江 忠男; 1913–2003), Japanese footballer and manager
- Tadao Ikeda (池田 忠雄; 1905–1964), Japanese screenwriter and film director
- Tadao Kasami (嵩 忠雄; 1930–2007), Japanese information theorist
- Tadao Kikumoto (菊本忠男), Japanese inventor and engineer
- Tadao Kitajima (北島 忠雄; born 1966), Japanese shogi player
- Tadao Kobayashi (小林 忠生; born 1930), Japanese footballer and manager
- Tadao Mitome (三留 理男; born 1938), Japanese photographer
- Tadao Nagahama (長浜 忠夫; 1936–1980), Japanese anime director
- Tadao Nakamura (born 1947), Japanese golfer
- Tadao Oda (小田 忠雄; born 1940), Japanese mathematician
- Tadao Onishi (大西 忠生; 1943–2006), Japanese footballer
- Tadao Sato (佐藤 忠男; born 1930), Japanese film critic and theorist
- Tadao Sawai (沢井 忠夫; 1938–1997), Japanese musician
- Shizuki Tadao (志筑 忠雄; 1760–1806), Japanese astronomer and translator
- Tadao Takayama (高山 忠雄; 1904–1980), Japanese footballer
- Tadao Tannaka (淡中 忠郎; 1908–1986), Japanese mathematician
- Tadao Tominari (冨成 忠夫; 1919–1992), Japanese photographer
- Tadao Tomomatsu, American actor
- Tadao Tosa (土佐 忠雄; born 1942), Japanese diver
- Tadao Uchikoshi (打越 忠夫; born 1965), Japanese long-distance runner
- Tadao Uesako (上迫 忠夫; 1921–1986), Japanese gymnast
- Tadao Umesao (梅棹 忠夫; 1920–2010), Japanese anthropologist
- Tadao Watanabe (渡辺 忠雄; 1898–1980), Japanese politician
- Tadao Yanaihara (矢内原 忠雄; 1893–1961), Japanese economist and academic
- Tadao Yasuda (安田 忠夫; 1963–2026), Japanese sumo and professional wrestler

== Fictional characters ==
- Tadao Hiiragi (柊 ただお), a character in the manga series Lucky Star
- Tadao Yokoshima (横島 忠夫), a character in the manga series Ghost Sweeper Mikami
