= Shibuya (disambiguation) =

Shibuya ([ɕì.bɯ̈́.jä́]) is one of the 23 special wards of Tokyo, Japan. Named after it are:

- Shibuya Station, a train station located in Shibuya, Tokyo
- Shibuya River, a river in Tokyo, Japan
- Shibuya-kei, a subgenre of Japanese pop music

== People ==
- Shibuya (surname) ([ɕí.bɯ̈̀.jä̀])

== See also ==
- Shibutani
- Shibuya Fifteen, a 2005 Japanese television drama
- Kōza-Shibuya Station, a train station on the Odakyū Enoshima Line, Japan
