= Masaoka =

Masaoka is a Japanese surname. Notable people with the surname include:

- Kenzō Masaoka (1898–1988), early anime creator
- Kunio Masaoka (1908–1978), renowned Japanese photographer
- Masaoka Shiki (1867–1902), pen-name of Masaoka Noboru, a Japanese author, poet, literary critic, and journalist
- Mike Masaoka (1915–1991), American activist and member of the Church of Jesus Christ of Latter-day Saints
- Miya Masaoka (born 1958), American musician and composer who performs on the 17-string Japanese koto zither
- Onan Masaoka (born 1977), Major League Baseball left-handed pitcher
