= Toshiko Okanoue =

Avant-garde artist (b. 1928)

- 岡上 淑子
- Born: January 3, 1928 (age 98); Kōchi, Japan
- Citizenship: Japanese
- Education: Keisen Girls' High School (Class of 1952), Bunka Gakuin in Ochanomizu
- Occupation: Collage artist
- Years active: 1950–present
- Movement: Surrealism

Toshiko Okanoue (岡上 淑子, Okanoue Toshiko; born 3 January 1928) is a Japanese artist associated with the Japanese avant-garde art world of the 1950s and best known for her Surrealist photo collages.

== Early career ==
Born in Kochi and raised in Tokyo, Okanoue began to make photo collages while studying fashion and drawing at the Bunka Gakuin in Tokyo in the early 1950s. The young Okanoue initially knew little of art history or the Surrealist movement.

In 1952, a classmate from Keisen Girls' High School introduced Okanoue to poet and art critic Shuzo Takiguichi, (Note: It was née Asaka Wakayama, or Mrs.Asaka Takemitsu, whom Okanoue met with at Keisen Girls' High School in 1946 and connected Okanoue with art critique Shuzo Takiguchi. Wakayama knew Tōru Takemitsu at an experimental artists' group Jikkenkōbō, and Okanoue was introduced to Shuzo Takiguichi via Takemitsu.) a leading figure in the Japanese Surrealist movement, who would help introduce her to the wider art world, including the work of European Surrealists, such as German artist Max Ernst, who was an influence on her subsequent work.

Over the next six years she would produce over 100 works. She exhibited in two exhibits including, solo shows in 1953 and 1956 at the Takemiya Gallery in Tokyo, (Note: Takemiya Gallery (1951 – 1957) was an exhibition space that shared a store space at Takemiya art material dealer which resumed its deal after the Second World War. Shuzo Takiguchi was producing art shows at Takemiya and entitled to select which author's works to put on the show between 1951 and 1956 before the gallery closed.) In the second show at Takemiya, over fifty pieces of Okanoue's monochrome photographs were hung on display. Also exhibited at the "Abstract and Illusion" exhibition at the National Museum of Modern Art, Tokyo between 1 December 1953 and 20 January 1954, which attracted total of 16,657 visitors appreciating 91 artworks by 91 artists.

== Artistic style ==
In post-war Japan, shortages of goods meant that foreign goods filled the market and fashion and lifestyle magazines such as Vogue, Harpers Bazaar, and Life magazine provided the raw materials for Okanoue's collages. Her black and white photo collages mix images of places, objects and people, often fashionable European women, in dynamic and often unsettling compositions whose subjects explored themes of war, femininity and the relations between the sexes.

== Early end of professional career, obscurity and rediscovery ==
Like many women of her generation, marriage meant the end of her career. In 1958, at only 28, she stopped producing collage work when she married painter Fujino Kazutomo, thought she would continue to draw and paint non-professionally. After divorce, Okanoue took her children and ailing mother to Kōchi and lived away from art activities.

Okanoue's early collage work faded into obscurity for 40 years until rediscovered in the 1990s by the curator Ryūichi Kaneko of the Tokyo Photographic Art Museum. In 1996 Meguro Museum of Art included Okanoue's work in the Light Up exhibition and a solo exhibit entitled "Toshiko Okanoue's Photo Collages: Droplets of Dreams" was presented in Dai-ichi Mutual Life Insurance Co. South Gallery. A first monograph of her work was published in 2002, entitled "Drop of Dreams: Toshiko Okanoue: Works 1950-1956."

In 2019, the Tokyo Metropolitan Teien Art Museum presented a one-artist show of works of Okanoue entitled, "TOSHIKO OKANOUE, Photo Collage : The Miracle of Silence" as well as an exhibit catalogue of the same name.

== Publications ==
=== Writings and catalogues ===
- Droplets of dreams : Okanoue Toshiko photo-collage. Tokyo: Dai-ichi Mutual Life Insurance Co. 2000. OCLC 921291047.
- Drop of dreams. Tucson, AZ: Nazraeli Press. 2002. OCLC 682185475.
- The miracle of silence. L.A, Or: Nazraeli. 2007. ISBN 9781590051962. OCLC 171130839.
- Bonajo, Melanie; Demand, Thomas; Ricci, Moira; Okanoue, Toshiko; Sauter, Martina; Lee, Myoung Ho (2008). Foam. No. 15, Summer 2008, Construct. Amsterdam: Foam Magazine.
- Haruka na tabi : Okanoue Toshiko sakuhinshū [A long journey : the works of Toshiko Okanoue] (in Japanese). Tokyo: Kawade Shobō Shinsha. 2015. ISBN 9784309275611. OCLC 905837687.
- Okanoue, Toshiko (2015). Haruka na tabi: Okanoue Toshiko sakuhinshū [A long journey : the works of Toshiko Okanoue]. Tokyo: Kawade Shobō Shinsha. ISBN 9784309275611. OCLC 905837687.

== See also ==
- Shuzo Takiguichi
- Ryuichi Kaneko
- Surrealism in Japan
- Avant-garde photography in Japan
- Photomontage
