= Matsushima (disambiguation) =

Matsushima is a scenic coastal area, notable for being one of the three views of Japan.

Matsushima can also refer to:

== Locations ==
- Matsushima, Miyagi, a town in northern Japan
  - Matsushima Station, a train station served by the Tōhoku Main Line
  - Matsushima-Kaigan Station, a train station served by the Senseki Line
- Matsushima, Kumamoto, a former town in Kumamoto Prefecture
- The Liancourt Rocks, a group of islets sometimes referred to on 19th-century maps as "Matsushima"
- Ulleungdo, an island sometimes referred to on 19th-century maps as "Matsushima"

== People with the surname ==
- Kotaro Matsushima, Japanese rugby union player
- Nanako Matsushima, Japanese actress
- Midori Matsushima, Japanese politician
- Mina Matsushima (松島 美菜, born 1991), Japanese swimmer
- Minori Matsushima, Japanese voice actress
- Susumu Matsushima, Japanese photographer
- Yozo Matsushima, Japanese mathematician

== Ships ==
- Japanese cruiser Matsushima, a protected cruiser launched by Japan in 1890, named after the coastal area
