= Susumu Matsushima =

Japanese photographer

Susumu Matsushima

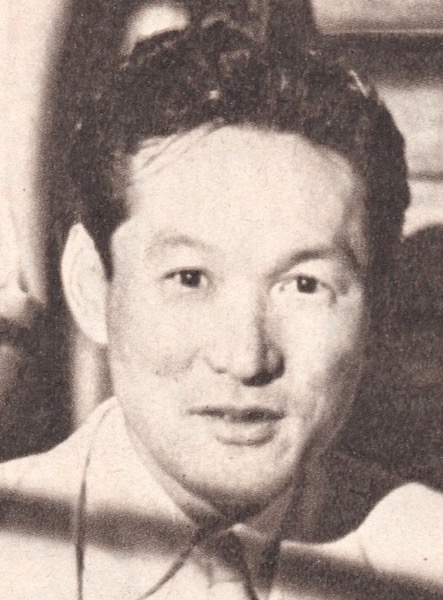
Matsushima Susumu 1956

(松島 進, Matsushima Susumu; 5 January 1913 – 2009) was a Japanese photographer famous for portraits of women, fashion photography, and nudes.

== Early life ==
Matsushima was born on 5 January 1913 in Ushigome, Tokyo. He studied at Tōkyō Kōtō Kōgei Gakkō (東京高等工芸学校, later incorporated within Chiba University), where a fellow-student was Gen Ōtsuka.

== Photography career ==
On graduating in 1933, he joined Jiji Shinpō-sha, but soon quit and moved to Nikkatsu, where he worked as a photographer, focusing especially on portraits of women, which he also submitted to Photo Times and other photographic magazines.

After the war Matsushima went freelance, working on portraits of women, fashion, and the like. In 1948 he created the group Shashinka Shūdan (写真家集団) with Fujio Matsugi, Sankichi Ozaki and others. He continued to work prolifically after this.

Matsushima was an honorary member of the Japan Professional Photographers Society and the Japan Photographers Association.

== Solo exhibitions ==
- Dai ikkai Matsushima Susumu Josei Shashin-ten (第1回松島進女性写真展), 1952.
- Matsushima Susumu Josei Shashin Kyōshitsu (松島進女性写真教室), 1969.

== Publications ==
- Josei satsuei no jissai (女性撮影の実際. Tokyo: Amiko Shuppansha, 1951. (in Japanese)
- Josei-bi no utsushikata (女性美の寫し方). 大泉書店, 1951. (in Japanese)
- Young Lady Nude: 36 Sheets of Color. 三世新社, 1968. A portfolio.
- (Joint work) Pōtrēto nūdo fotogurafi ポートレート・ヌード・フォトグラフイ). N.p. Matsushima Susumu Fotosutajio, 1979. (in Japanese)
- Āto forumu: 70-nin no moderu ni yoru rafu-pōzu (アート・フォルム：70人のモデルによる裸婦ポーズ). Tokyo: Erute Shuppan, 1990. ISBN 4-87199-020-6. (in Japanese)
- Sutā pōtrēto-shū (スターポートレート集). (in Japanese)
- Nūdo forumu (ヌードフォルム). (in Japanese)
