= Kōrō Honjō =

Japanese photographer

Kōrō Honjō (本庄 光郎, Honjō Kōrō; 1907-1995) was a renowned Japanese photographer.

By 1933, Honjō was active in the Naniwa Photography Club, where museum accounts list him among the members associated with the club's shift from New Photography toward Surrealist and abstract avant-garde work in Osaka.

In 1937, he co-founded the Avant-Garde Image Group with Yoshifumi Hattori, Gingo Hanawa, Tarui Yoshio, and Terushichi Hirai, a circle dedicated to experimental photographic expression. The Osaka section of the 2022 Tokyo Photographic Art Museum exhibition Avant-Garde Rising: The Photographic Vanguard in Modern Japan later discussed the group as part of the Kansai avant-garde.

In 1956, Honjō also participated in the newly founded Japan Subjective Photography League, a postwar framework through which prewar avant-garde photographers such as Kansuke Yamamoto were briefly regrouped alongside emerging postwar figures including Kiyoji Ōtsuji, Ikkō Narahara, and Yasuhiro Ishimoto in the First International Subjective Photography Exhibition later that year.
