= Yoshifumi Hattori =

Japanese photographer

- 服部 義文
- Occupation: Photographer
- Known for: Prewar experimental photography * Co-founding VIVI * Works such as The Legends (Gods) and the Allegory series
- Movement: Avant-garde photography

Yoshifumi Hattori (服部義文, Hattori Yoshifumi) was a Japanese photographer active in prewar experimental photography and postwar Nagoya avant-garde.

According to an exhibition text published by MEM, Hattori studied butoh dance under Baku Ishii in Tokyo before turning to photography in 1937. In that year he co-founded the Avant-Garde Image Group with Tarui Yoshio, Hanawa Gingo, Kōrō Honjō, and Hirai Terushichi, and his work The Legends (Gods), shown at the 27th Nami-ten Exhibition in 1938, received critical acclaim.

After World War II, Hattori became a founding member of the Nagoya photography collective VIVI, formed in 1947 with the photographer-poet Kansuke Yamamoto and photographers Keiichirō Gotō and Minayoshi Takada.

== Early life and turn to photography ==
MEM's profile states that Hattori initially studied dance under Baku Ishii in Tokyo and only switched to photography in 1937. This trajectory places him among those late-1930s Japanese photographers who entered the medium through broader avant-garde interests rather than through an older pictorialist tradition.

== Avant-Garde Image Group and prewar experimental photography ==
In 1937, Hattori helped found the Avant-Garde Image Group with Tarui Yoshio, Hanawa Gingo, Kōrō Honjō, and Hirai Terushichi. MEM describes the group as being dedicated to experimental photographic expression, and the Osaka section of the 2022 Tokyo Photographic Art Museum exhibition Avant-Garde Rising: The Photographic Vanguard in Modern Japan discusses it alongside the Naniwa Photography Club, Tampei Photography Club, and Ashiya Camera Club as part of the Kansai avant-garde. Hattori's work The Legends (Gods), exhibited at the 27th Nami-ten in 1938, received critical acclaim. The same source notes that he soon moved away from overt avant-garde styles and turned instead toward depictions of traditional Japanese life and aesthetics.

== VIVI and postwar Nagoya avant-garde ==
Takeba's survey of Nagoya photography notes that, like Minoru Sakata, Hattori had previously belonged to the Naniwa Photography Club, and that after moving to Nagoya he was active in the Akebono Photography Club. The same survey identifies Hattori as one of the four photographers—together with Yamamoto, Takada, and Gotō—who formed VIVI in 1947. Takeba characterizes this regrouping of figures who had stood near the prewar avant-garde movement as giving a strong impression of an avant-garde "revival" in postwar Nagoya.

The 2021 Nagoya survey also reproduces Hattori's postwar works Allegory A, Allegory B, and Allegory C, all dated 1950. These works help document Hattori's continued participation in the postwar experimental milieu around VIVI.

== Position in Nagoya photography ==
Hattori is relevant to the history of Photography in Nagoya as a figure linking prewar experimental photography with postwar avant-garde activity in the city. His career is also relevant to accounts of avant-garde photography in Japan, especially through the combination of his late-1930s experimental work and his later participation in VIVI alongside Kansuke Yamamoto.

== See also ==
- Kansuke Yamamoto (artist)
- VIVI
- Photography in Nagoya
- Surrealism in Nagoya
- Avant-garde photography in Japan
- Naniwa Photography Club
- Keiichirō Gotō
- Minayoshi Takada
