= Shibuya (surname) =

Shibuya (渋谷; Japanese pronunciation: [ɕí.bɯ̈̀.jä̀] (Note: The family name is only pronounced like this. The placename is prnounced [ɕì.bɯ̈́.jä́].)) is a Japanese surname. Notable people with the surname include:

- Jinshichi Shibuya, Japanese entomologist
- Kaho Shibuya (born 1991), Japanese media personality
- Kazuko Shibuya (渋谷 員子; born 1965), Japanese video game artist
- Kinji Shibuya (1921–2010), American professional wrestler and actor
- Kotono Shibuya (born 1975), Japanese actress and singer
- Miki Shibuya (渋谷 幹; born 1940), Japanese biathlete
- Minoru Shibuya (1907–1980), Japanese film director
- Momoko Shibuya (born 1987), Japanese actress
- Nagisa Shibuya (born 1996), member of the Japanese idol girl group NMB48
- Ryūkichi Shibuya (born 1907), Japanese photographer
- Tenma Shibuya (born 1969), Japanese actor, classical dancer, and cultural exchange activist

== Fictional characters ==
- Kanon Shibuya, one of the main characters in Love Live! Superstar!!
- Kazuya Shibuya, a character in Ghost Hunt
- Rin Shibuya, one of the main characters in The Idolmaster Cinderella Girls
- Tomochika Shibuya, a character in Uta no Prince-Sama
- Yuri Shibuya, the main character in Kyo Kara Maoh!
