= Shibutani =

Shibutani (渋谷) is a Japanese surname. Notable people with the surname include:

- Alex Shibutani, American ice dancer
- Goro Shibutani (渋谷 五郎), Japanese table tennis player
- Hiroshi Shibutani (渋谷 浩, born 1967), Japanese table tennis player
- Maia Shibutani, American ice dancer
- Shuu Shibutani, Japanese professional wrestler
- Subaru Shibutani, lead singer of Japanese idol group Kanjani8
- Toshihiro Shibutani, Japanese long-distance runner
- Tamotsu Shibutani, Japanese-American sociologist

== See also ==
- Shibutani Kaidō (渋谷街道), a road connecting Kyōto and Yamashina
- Shibutani Kōyama Tumulus (渋谷向山古墳), a circular shaped tumulus in Tenri, Nara
- Shibutani, Ōsaka, a region within Ikeda, Ōsaka
- Shibuya (disambiguation), an alternative way of reading 渋谷
