= Otto Steinert =

German photographer

Otto Steinert (12 July 1915 – 3 March 1978) was a German photographer.

== Life and work ==
Born in Saarbrücken, Germany, Steinert was a medical doctor by profession and was self-taught in photography. After World War II, he initially worked for the State School for Art and Craft (Staatliche Schule für Kunst und Handwerk, today HTW) in Saarbrücken.

Otto Steinert's photography is characterized by his opposition to straight photograph using experimental techniques that explore light, motion, and abstraction, often utilising the expressive potential of photographic blur. He frequently used long exposures, camera movement, and unconventional framing to transform ordinary subjects into dynamic, visually striking compositions.

He was the founder of the fotoform photography group.

From 1959, he taught at the Folkwang Hochschule design school in Essen, where he later died.

His archive is part of the photographic collection of the Museum Folkwang, Essen.

Steinert's conception of subjective photography also shaped postwar developments in Japan. Introduced there in 1954, his ideas informed the founding of the Japan Subjective Photography League in 1956 and the First International Subjective Photography Exhibition later that year, whose Steinert-curated international section briefly placed prewar avant-garde figures such as Shūzō Takiguchi and Kansuke Yamamoto alongside younger photographers including Kiyoji Ōtsuji, Ikkō Narahara, and Yasuhiro Ishimoto.

== Exhibitions ==
- Museum Folkwang, Essen, Germany, 2015/2016
- 2019/2020: Ludwig Windstosser. Fotografie der Nachkriegsmoderne, Museum für Fotografie, Berlin
- Photo Élysée, Lausanne, Switzerland, 2023 – Flou. Une histoire photographique / Blur. A Photographic History

== Publications ==
- Parisian Forms. Göttingen, Germany: Steidl, 2008. Edited by Ute Eskildsen. ISBN 978-3865216243. Published in conjunction with an exhibition at Museum Folkwang, Essen.

== Collections ==
Steinert's work is held in the following public collections:

- Metropolitan Museum of Art, New York: 2 prints (as of November 2019)
- Museum of Modern Art, New York: 3 prints (as of November 2019)
