= The Museum of Art, Kōchi =

Art museum in Kōchi, Japan

- 高知県立美術館
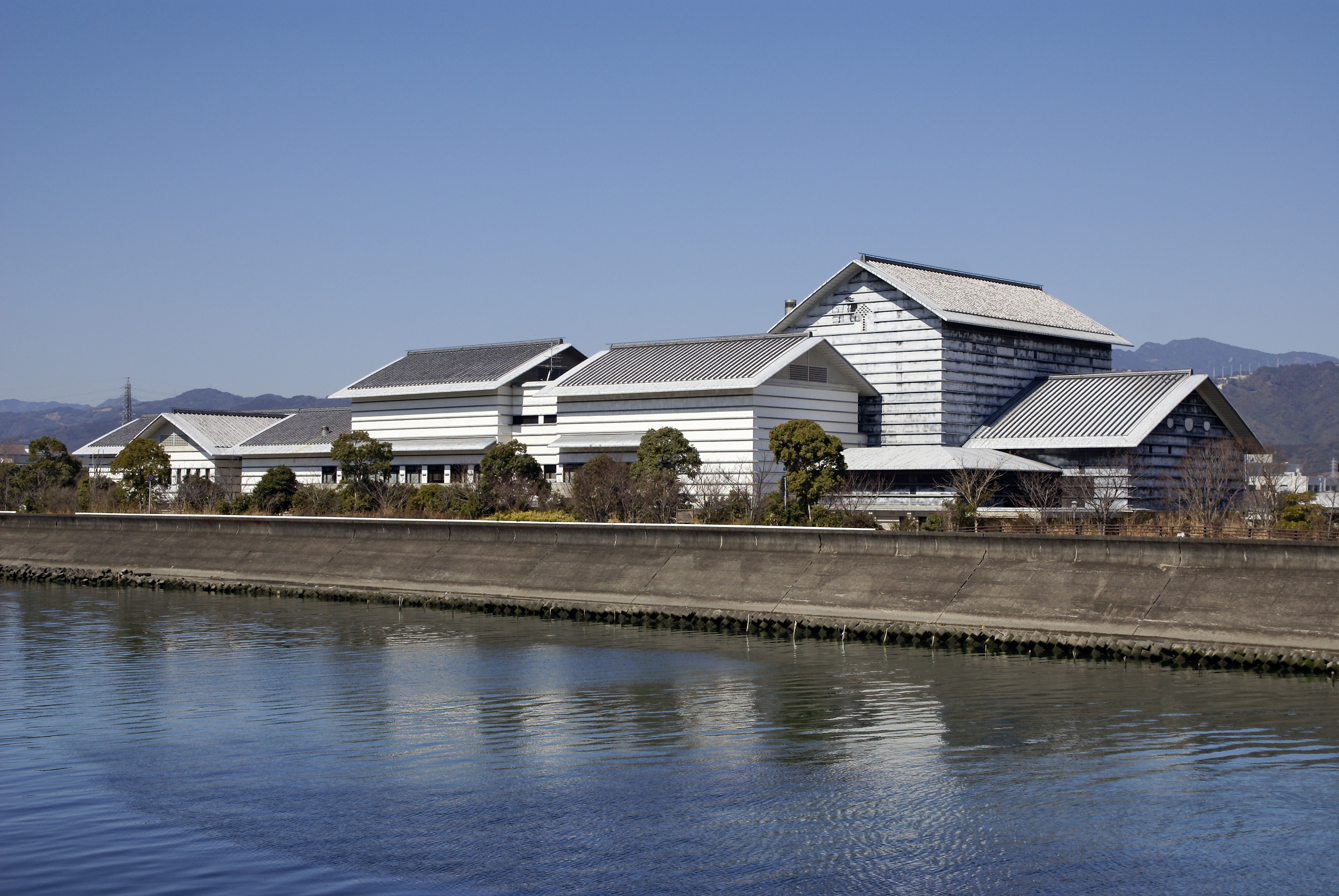
- The Museum of Art, Kōchi

- The Museum of Art, Kōchi The Museum of Art, Kōchi (Japan)
- Established: March, 1993
- Location: 353-2 Takasu, Kōchi-shi, Kōchi-ken 781-8123
- Coordinates: 33°33′40″N 133°34′22″E
- Map

The Museum of Art, Kōchi (高知県立美術館, Kōchi Kenritsu Bijutsukan) was established in Kōchi, Kōchi Prefecture, Japan in 1993. It is one of Japan's many museums which are supported by a prefecture.

The permanent collection includes works by local artists as well as Marc Chagall, a very large collection of photographs and personal items owned by Yasuhiro Ishimoto, and there is also a stage for Noh and other performances.

== See also ==
- Prefectural museum
