= Yoshio Tarui =

Japanese photographer

Yoshio Tarui (樽井 芳雄, Tarui Yoshio; 1902–1977) was a Japanese photographer.

In 1937, he co-founded the Avant-Garde Image Group with Yoshifumi Hattori, Gingo Hanawa, Kōrō Honjō, and Terushichi Hirai, a circle dedicated to experimental photographic expression. The Osaka section of the 2022 Tokyo Photographic Art Museum exhibition Avant-Garde Rising: The Photographic Vanguard in Modern Japan later discussed this Kansai milieu and included Tarui among its artists.
