= Japan Subjective Photography League =

- 日本主観主義写真連盟
- Formation: May 1956
- Type: Photography organization
- Purpose: Subjective photography
- Location: Japan
- Region served: Japan
- Key people: Shūzō Takiguchi; Kansuke Yamamoto; Kiyoji Ōtsuji; Ikkō Narahara; Hisae Imai; Yasuhiro Ishimoto

Japan Subjective Photography League (Japanese: 日本主観主義写真連盟 (Nihon Shukanshugi Shashin Renmei); also translated as Japanese Subjectivism Photography Federation) was a Japanese postwar photography organization founded in May 1956 in response to the international reception of Otto Steinert's Subjektive Fotografie. Closely associated with the First International Subjective Photography Exhibition held at Nihonbashi Takashimaya in Tokyo later that year, the league brought together critics and photographers ranging from prewar avant-garde figures such as Shūzō Takiguchi, Nobuya Abe, and Kansuke Yamamoto to younger postwar photographers including Kiyoji Ōtsuji, Ikkō Narahara, Hisae Imai, and Yasuhiro Ishimoto. Although short-lived, the league has been discussed as an important postwar site for rearticulating experimental and avant-garde photography in Japan after the dominance of realist photography in the early postwar years.

== Background ==
In postwar Japan, the dominant current in photography was the Realism Photography Movement, which privileged documentary directness and social legibility. At a time when photographic magazines still exerted considerable influence over the field, avant-garde photographic expression by Kansuke Yamamoto and others associated with prewar experimental photography was largely overlooked. Against that background, the reception of Steinert's Subjective Photography reopened the medium to techniques and attitudes associated with prewar avant-garde photography and New Photography, while positively valuing the photographer's subjective transformation of meaning rather than the mere recording of the visible world. Later commentators have accordingly treated subjective photography in Japan as an important countercurrent to realism, both for its revaluation of diverse prewar experimental techniques and for its emphasis on the photographer's interpretive role in creating new meanings for the subject.

== Origins and formation ==
The league emerged from the Japanese reception of Steinert's Subjective Photography, first articulated in Germany in 1951 and introduced in Japanese photography magazines by the mid-1950s. Japanese photographers had already appeared in Subjective Photography 2 (1954–55), and in May 1956 the Japan Subjective Photography League was founded with about forty members, including Takiguchi, Abe, Shōzō Kitadai, and Kansuke Yamamoto. In Stojković's account, the league was the main focused attempt of the 1950s to reformulate the importance of alternative approaches to photography after the decline of postwar realism.

== The First International Subjective Photography Exhibition ==
The league was closely tied to the First International Subjective Photography Exhibition, held at Nihonbashi Takashimaya in Tokyo in December 1956. Organized with Sankei Camera, the exhibition combined works selected by Steinert from fourteen countries with photographs by league members and open-call submissions from Japan. It later toured other cities, including Osaka, Fukuoka, Nagasaki, and Kanazawa, helping to circulate the language of subjective photography nationally. Stojković notes that the exhibition placed prewar Surrealist photographers such as Yamamoto alongside emerging postwar artists such as Ōtsuji, making it one of the clearest postwar sites where earlier avant-garde photography was temporarily recontextualized rather than simply forgotten.

=== Participants ===
According to Jelena Stojković, 67 Japanese photographers participated in the exhibition.

Participants documented in the literature include:

- Terushichi Hirai (1900–1970)
- Kōrō Honjō (1907–1995)
- Kiyoshi Niiyama (1911–1969)
- Hitori Yoshizaki (1912–1984)
- Shōji Ueda (1913–2000)
- Kansuke Yamamoto (1914–1987)
- Keiichirō Gotō (1918–2004)
- Yasuhiro Ishimoto (1921–2012)
- Kiyoji Ōtsuji (1923–2001)
- Shigeru Onishi (1928–1994)
- Tetsuya Ichimura (born 1930)
- Hisae Imai (1931–2009)
- Ikkō Narahara (1931–2020)

== Prewar avant-garde and postwar generation ==
One of the league's most distinctive features was its cross-generational composition. Later accounts note that figures such as Yamamoto, Kei'ichirō Gotō, Kōrō Honjō, Terushichi Hirai, and Hitori Yoshizaki participated in the league and exhibited in the First International Subjective Photography Exhibition, while Takiguchi was also involved in the movement. At the same time, the league and its associated publications brought younger postwar photographers into the same field of reference, including Ōtsuji, Narahara, Imai, and Ishimoto. This temporary regrouping of older experimental photographers alongside younger postwar practitioners is one of the league's main historical distinctions.

== Publications and printed platforms ==
The league's ideas also circulated through magazines and special issues. An important printed platform was the May 1957 special issue Bessatsu Atorie Atarashii Shashin, devoted to subjective photography. Ryūichi Kaneko notes that this issue presented 130 works by twenty-nine photographers and brought together not only Yamamoto, Abe, Honjō, and Yoshizaki—described there as pioneers of prewar avant-garde photography—but also Ōtsuji, Narahara, Imai, and Ishimoto, who had joined the field after the war. In this sense, the league's printed platforms did more than publicize a short-lived movement: they briefly made visible a continuity between prewar experimental photography and younger postwar practices.

== Reception and criticism ==
Later commentators have described the league's significance less in terms of institutional longevity than in its attempt to revalue experimental techniques associated with prewar avant-garde and New Photography at a time when realism dominated photographic culture. Subjective photography also positively valued the photographer's interpretive and imaginative transformation of the subject, but the movement was criticized for the formalization of technique and for the conceptual vagueness of "subjectivism" as a doctrine. Japanese photography histories have also noted that the movement's reception was mixed from the start and that it had largely lost momentum by the end of the 1950s.

== Legacy ==
Although short-lived, the league formed part of a broader postwar transition away from realism toward more subjective, symbolic, and formally experimental photographic languages. In this sense, it has been discussed as one of the contexts through which prewar avant-garde photography was reassessed in the 1950s and through which younger photographers such as Narahara entered a field newly open to non-realist experimentation. More broadly, the spread of subjective photography has been described as helping create the conditions in which the technical and symbolic expressiveness later associated with photographers such as Ikkō Narahara, Shōmei Tōmatsu, and Kikuji Kawada could emerge, while Stojković argues that the VIVO generation inherited a hybrid legacy of both realism and subjectivism. In that sense, the league can be understood not as the direct origin of VIVO, but as part of the larger postwar shift through which Japanese photography moved toward more subjective and symbolically charged forms of expression.

== Kansuke Yamamoto and the prewar avant-garde generation ==
For Kansuke Yamamoto, the league was significant as one of the few postwar contexts in which photographers associated with prewar Surrealist and avant-garde practice were briefly regrouped and re-exhibited. Yamamoto participated in the formation of the league in May 1956, and the First International Subjective Photography Exhibition placed his work alongside both prewar experimental photographers and a younger postwar generation. The league therefore serves as an important relay point in the postwar afterlife of prewar Japanese avant-garde photography, especially in histories that seek to reconnect Yamamoto and his contemporaries to broader international debates over subjectivity, experiment, and the legacy of Surrealist photography.

== See also ==
- Kansuke Yamamoto (artist)
- Shūzō Takiguchi
- Kiyoji Ōtsuji
- Ikkō Narahara
- VIVO (photography)
- Avant-garde photography in Japan
