= Hisae Imai =

Japanese photographer

- Born: July 19, 1931; Tokyo, Japan
- Died: February 17, 2009 (aged 77); Shinjuku, Tokyo, Japan
- Known for: Photography

Hisae Imai (今井 壽惠, Imai Hisae; 1931–2009) was a Japanese photographer who specialized in the photography of horses.

== Biography ==
Born in Tokyo in 1931, Imai graduated from Bunka Gakuin (文化学院) in 1952. Her father owned a photography studio in the Matsuya department store in Ginza, and after graduation she was encouraged to go into photography as well. She had her first solo exhibition in 1956 and went on to win several awards such as the Newcomer's Award from the Photographic Society of Japan and the Camera Geijutsu Art Award.

In 1957, Imai's work also appeared in Bessatsu Atorie Atarashii Shashin, a special issue devoted to subjective photography that emerged from the same postwar milieu as the newly founded Japan Subjective Photography League and brought together emerging photographers such as Ikkō Narahara, Kiyoji Ōtsuji, and Yasuhiro Ishimoto alongside prewar avant-garde figures including Kansuke Yamamoto.

In 1962 Imai was in a car accident that left her temporarily blind for a year and a half, which left her unable to create photographs. After the accident, Shuji Terayama invited her to watch a horse race with him. She was very moved by the horses, and after meeting the racehorse Nijinsky in 1970, she took up photography again. From the 1970s onward, most of her numerous solo exhibitions were of photographs of horses.

Imai died in a hospital in Shinjuku on 17 February 2009.

== Permanent collections ==
Imai's photographs are represented in the permanent collections of:

- Tokyo Metropolitan Museum of Photography
- Nihon University
- Museum of Modern Art, New York City
- Bibliothèque nationale de France (Paris)
- Museum für Kunst und Gewerbe Hamburg
- Yamaguchi Prefectural Museum of Art
- Kawasaki City Museum
- Kiyosato Museum of Photographic Arts
