= Fujio Shido =

Japanese chef

- Born: 志度 藤雄 (Shido Fujio); 1901
- Died: 1986 (aged 84–85)
- Education: Le Cordon Bleu
- Culinary career
- Cooking style: French cuisine; Curry
- Previous restaurants: Nichido Grill; Hana no Ki; Maison Shido; Four Seasons
- Award won: Culinary Academy of France Award (1972)

Fujio Shido (志度 藤雄, Shido Fujio; 1901–1986) was a Japanese chef who played an important role in introducing French cuisine to Japan. When he was in his early 20s, he stowed away on a ship going to London, where he was deported. However, on his trip back to Japan, he escaped the ship when it stopped in Marseille, eventually making his way to Paris. There he studied at the Le Cordon Bleu cooking school.

After World War II, he returned to Japan and opened a series of restaurants. In the mid-1950s, he served as the cook at the official residence of the Prime Minister of Japan. Shido was a pioneer of French cuisine in Japan, and is credited with creating fond de veau curry and soupe Paris soir, the former of which made him an overnight celebrity in Japan. He wrote books on Japanese and French cuisine, one of which influenced Iron Chef French Hiroyuki Sakai. Sakai studied under Shido for three years.

== Biography ==
Fujio Shido was born in 1901, the youngest son out of the eight children of Ueda Sadaemon and his wife. Shortly after birth, he was adopted by Shido Shigetarō. After graduating from grade school, he began working for an uncle at the Western-style food restaurant, Seiyōken (精養軒), in Kōbe while living above the restaurant. After working there for over four years, and after encouragement from mentors and friends, he took a position at Manyōken (萬葉軒) in 1921, where he worked under chef Tokuzō Akiyama's top protege, Kanematsu Imagawa (今川 金松).

Imagawa's techniques influenced Shido to take a position as a ship's cook on the Japanese Katori Maru (香取丸), where he traveled from Kōbe to Shanghai and then to Sydney. After stowing away on a ship bound for London, he was disappointed in the food at The Piccadilly Hotel. He was arrested in England for illegally entering the country and deported to Japan. When the ship he was on made a stop in Marseille, Shido jumped ship. He made his way to Paris, where he obtained employment at a Japanese restaurant while studying at the Le Cordon Bleu. He continued his studies of French cuisine at other restaurants, including Le Meurice and the Hôtel de Crillon.

He became good friends with the diplomat, Mamoru Shigemitsu, and Shigeru Yoshida, and served as the head chef of the Japanese embassy in London from 1941 until the end of World War II. After returning to Japan, he opened and became the head chef at Nichido Grill (日動グリル, Nichidou Guriru). There he created fond de veau curry (フォン・ド・ヴォー・カレー, fon do vō karē), a stock that could be used as a base for making curry, becoming an overnight celebrity. Around that time, he also created soupe Paris soir (パリ・ソワール, Pari sowāru), a chilled and gelled soup created by alternately pouring consommé and vichyssoise into a chilled glass. Yoshida then encouraged him to move to Tokyo.

In 1956, Shido opened and became the head chef at Hana no Ki (花の木). Shido then became the cook at the official residence of the Prime Minister before moving on to open and be head chef at Maison Shido (メイゾン・シド, Meizon Shido) and subsequently Four Seasons (四季, Shiki). The wedding reception of celebrities Hideko Takamine and Zenzo Matsuyama was held at Maison Shido.

His French cuisine was described as "at the highest level" by Iron Chef French Hiroyuki Sakai, who studied under Shido for three years at Shiki beginning when he was 19 years old. Sakai cites Shido's book, As a Cook, as a major influence on his learning and career. Shido received the Culinary Academy of France Award (Académie Culinaire de France Award) in 1972. He is considered a pioneer of French cuisine in Japan.

He died in 1986. He was featured, along with Nobuo Murakami and Asako Tsujimura, on the Nippon TV program Chefs That Changed the World (世界を変えた料理人, Sekai o Kaeta Ryourinin) on September 30, 2007.

== Bibliography ==
- 志度フランス料理 鶏・卵料理編 [Shido French Cuisine: Chicken and Egg Cuisine]. Shibata Shoten. 1972.
- 一料理人として : 神戸・パリ・ロンドン・銀座 [As a Cook: Kōbe, Paris, London, Ginza]. Bunka Shuppan Kyoku. June 1981. ISBN 4579300912.
