= Gochō Shigeo =

Japanese photographer

- 牛腸茂雄
- Born: November 2, 1946; Kamo, Niigata, Japan
- Died: June 2, 1983 (aged 36); Niigata, Japan
- Known for: Photography

Gochō Shigeo (牛腸茂雄) (November 2, 1946 – June 2, 1983) was a Japanese photographer.

== Early life ==
Shigeo was born in Kamo, Niigata Prefecture in 1946. As a child he suffered from Pott's Disease, a type of vertebral infection caused by tuberculosis. The treatment for the disease meant that Shigeo had to wear a lower body cast for an extended period of time.

== Career ==
In 1977 he published the book Self and Others. His work is included in the collections of the Museum of Fine Arts Houston, the San Francisco Museum of Modern Art, and the British Museum. The Japanese film Asako I & II (2018) features a scene outside an Osaka gallery exhibiting photographs by Shigeo.
