= All Japan Association of Photographic Societies =

The All-Japan Association of Photographic Societies was founded in 1926 under the auspices of The Asahi Shimbun, a well established Japanese newspaper, and is Japan's leading photography enthusiast group. It has about 700 local chapters with a total membership of around 14,000. It has the objectives of advancing and expanding photographic culture, holding photographic competitions and exhibitions, workshops, events and tours.

== The International Photographic Salon of Japan ==
The primary focus of The Asahi Shimbun and the AJAPS is on The International Photographic Salon of Japan. The first Salon was held in 1927. It was suspended during the World War II but resumed after its end. The 75th Salon will be held in 2015.
