= Kunio Masaoka =

Japanese photographer

Kunio Masaoka (正岡 国男, Masaoka Kunio; 1908–1978) was a Japanese photographer.

Masaoka has work held in the permanent collection of the Tokyo Photographic Art Museum.
