= Meguro Museum of Art, Tokyo =

Art museum in Japan

Coordinates: 35.634907°N 139.707663°E

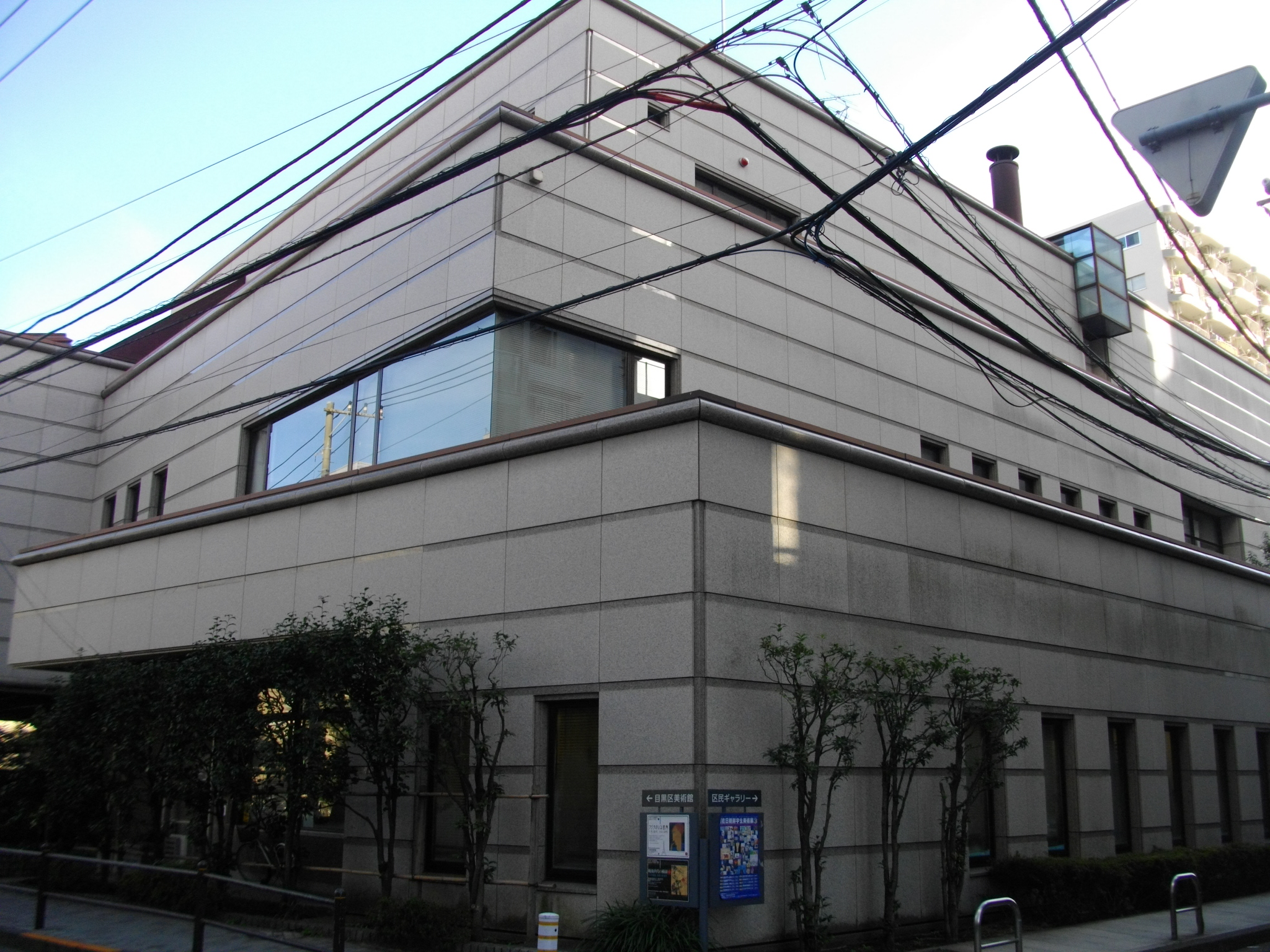
Exterior of the museum, 2014

The Meguro Museum of Art, Tokyo (目黒区美術館, Meguro-ku Bijutsukan) is an art gallery in Meguro, Tokyo, Japan.

The building was opened in November 1987. Designed by Nihon Sekkei (日本設計事務所), it is of reinforced concrete construction, with one basement floor and three floors above ground, and has floor space of 4059 square metres.

The permanent collection of the gallery includes works by such artists as Tsuguharu Fujita, Zenzōrō Kojima (児島善三郎), Shikanosuke Oka (岡鹿之助), Kazuo Sakata (坂田一男), and Kumi Sugai (菅井汲).

The museum is at Meguro 2–4–36, Meguro-ku, Tokyo, a ten-minute walk from Meguro Station.

The museum holds frequent exhibitions.
