= Ryūkichi Shibuya =

Japanese photographer

Ryūkichi Shibuya (渋谷龍吉, Shibuya Ryūkichi; 1907–1995) was a Japanese photographer.
