= Fujio Matsugi =

Japanese photographer

- 真継 不二夫
- Born: September 10, 1903; Kyoto Prefecture, Japan
- Died: June 11, 1984 (aged 80)
- Occupation: Photographer

Fujio Matsugi (真継 不二夫, Matsugi Fujio; September 10, 1903 – June 11, 1984) was a Japanese photographer who worked in Kyoto and Tokyo.

== Biography ==
Matsugi was born in Kyoto Prefecture. He co-founded the Kyoto Photographic Artists Association in 1927, and the Japan Photography Association in 1928, with Makihiko Yamamoto and others. He wrote Hōdō shashin e no michi (1942), a "book on photojournalism directed at amateur photographers", with advice on making realistic, artful images with modern techniques. In 1943 he published Kaigun Heigakko; Hodo Shashinshu, a photobook documenting the training of Japanese naval cadets. In 1948 he was a founding member of the Photographers Group (Shashin-ka Shūdan), and in 1950 he helped launch the Japan Professional Photographers Society.

In the 1950s, Matsugi contributed to the monthly hobbyist magazine Shashin no kyōshitsu (Photography Classroom). He won a photo tour of the Hawaiian Islands from the Canon Camera Company in autumn 1953, and published the resulting images as Hawaii As I See It (1953). His Hawaii photos were exhibited in 1954 in Tokyo and Osaka. Matsui photographed dancer Katherine Dunham in Tokyo, for the cover of her memoir A Touch of Innocence (1959). His "Person in a Room" (1930) was included in the A Century of Japanese Photography (1981). He died in 1984, at age 80.

The Museum of Modern Art has an untitled 1952 photograph by Matsugi. The Tokyo Photographic Art Museum has several nudes and portraits from Matsugi's Ecology of Beauty series. Work by Matsugi was included in the 2001 exhibition "Modern Photography in Japan, 1915-1940" at the Ansel Adams Center in San Francisco.
