= Yusaku Kamekura =

Japanese graphic designer

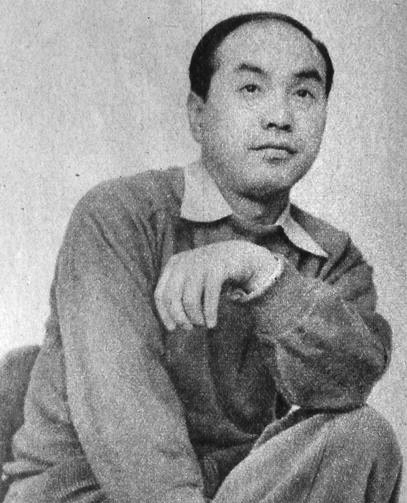
- Born: April 6, 1915
- Died: May 11, 1997
- Occupations: Illustrator, graphic designer, graphic artist
- Awards: Asahi Prize (1984); Order of the Sacred Treasure, 3rd class (1985); Person of Cultural Merit (1991); Art Directors Club Hall of Fame (1993)

Yūsaku Kamekura (亀倉雄策, Kamekura Yūsaku; April 6, 1915 – May 11, 1997) was a Japanese graphic designer, the leading figure in post-World War II Japanese graphic design. His stature in the field led to the nickname "Boss".

== Early life and career ==
Yūsaku Kamekura was born on April 6, 1915, in Yoshidamachi, Nishi-Kambara, Niigata Prefecture, Japan. He graduated from Nihon University High School in 1933. He took his first paying assignment at 17, when he designed the Japanese edition of Antoine de Saint-Exupéry's Night Flight.

From 1935 to 1937, Kamekura studied at the Institute of New Architecture and Industrial Arts in Tokyo. The Institute was founded by Renshichiro Kawakita to bring the precepts of the Bauhaus design movement to Japan. In 1938, he began working for Yōnosuke Natori laying out Nippon, a multilingual cultural magazine. Natori's training in Germany influenced Kamakura, who became fascinated with the moderns and, eventually, Bauhaus. He was a fan of Cassandre, Saint-Exupéry, and Jean Cocteau. Early on, it was recognized that Kamekura, Akira Kurosawa, and Kenzō Tange made up a trio of great Japanese visual artists of the 20th century.

In 1951, Kamekura helped found Japan Advertising Artists Club, which was the first group in Japan dedicated to graphic design. They were able to host their first poster exhibition within Tokyo and that ended up catching the publics attention to advertising design. He hosted the World Design Conference in 1960 but was still a trifle ashamed of the level of Japanese design. Convinced that it needed a boost and funding, Kamekura gathered the presidents of powerful corporations to sponsor a cooperative house agency: Nippon Design Center (NDC). The companies included were Asahi Beer, Toyota, Nomura Securities, Japan Railways, and Toshiba. After managing the design agency, he left to pursue an independent career.

In addition to the Bauhaus, Kamekura was influenced by the work of Cassandre and Russian constructivism. John Clifford writes that Kamekura's work "blended the functionality of these modern movements with the lyrical grace of traditional Japanese design," resulting in "a boldly minimal aesthetic that used color, light, geometry, and photography."

He was art director or editor for a series of magazines: Nippon (starting in 1937), Kaupapu (in 1939), and Commerce Japan (in 1949).

He later designed the katakana logo for the design magazine Idea, launched in 1953.

== 1964 Olympics ==

Yūsaku Kamekura's best known work is the logo and poster series he designed in 1961 for the 1964 Summer Olympics, reportedly created only a few hours before the design competition deadline. Kamekura eschewed the classical imagery traditionally associated with the Olympics in favor of a stark, modernist aesthetic, featuring the Olympic rings in simple gold below a red circle.

I drew a large red circle on top of the Olympic logo. People may have considered that this large red circle represented the hinomaru, but my actual intention was to express the sun. I wanted to create a fresh and vivid image through a balance between the large red circle and the five-ring Olympic mark. I thought that it would make the hinomaru look like a modern design.

The most memorable of Kamekura's Olympic posters captured a group of runners immediately after the start of a race, against a stark black background. Kamekura was the first to employ photography for Olympic posters, and this poster required split-second photography which was technically difficult to accomplish at the time. The photograph was made by Osamu Hayasaki, a commercial photographer inexperienced in sports photography; he took 80 exposures with a telephoto lens at 1/1000 of a second, and one was selected for Olympic poster. It is considered "a classic of modern poster design". Kamekura went on to design posters for many other events, including the 1972 Winter Olympics and the 1970 and 1989 World Design Expos.

== Graphic design ==
Kamekura created a number of distinctive corporate logos, including NTT, Nikon, Meiji, and TDK. Kamekura designed a series of logos for Nikon and the distinctive pyramid-shaped viewfinder of the Nikon F.

Yūsaku Kamekura was also a prolific author. One of his most notable works was an examination of what he considered the best logo designs, 1965's Trademarks and Symbols of the World, with a preface by Paul Rand. Kamekura's body of work is surveyed in his 1983 book The Works of Yusaku Kamekura.

In 1989 Kamekura founded the design magazine Creation. Bilingual in Japanese and English, Creation featured profiles and 20-page portfolios of international graphic designers, illustrators, and typographers selected by Kamekura. About seven designers were featured in each issue, and each issue was 168 pages in full color with no advertising. Creation ran for exactly twenty issues until 1993.

== Death and legacy ==
Yūsaku Kamekura died on 11 May 1997 in Tokyo.
