= Shūzō Takiguchi =

Japanese poet, art critic, and artist associated with Surrealism

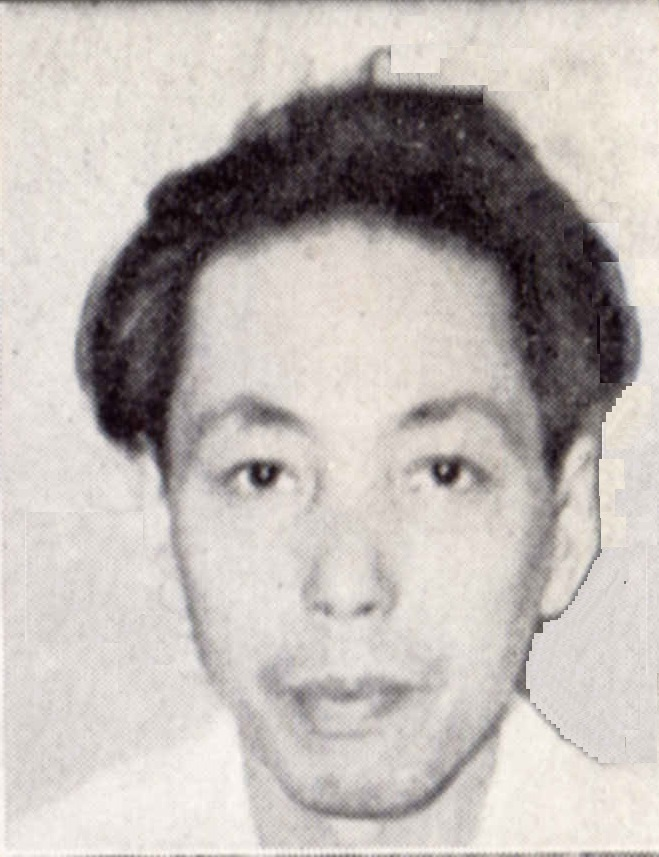
- Shūzō Takiguchi
- Born: December 7, 1903; Toyama Prefecture
- Died: July 1, 1979 (aged 75); Tokyo
- Education: Keio University
- Occupations: Poet, artist, art critic
- Writing career
- Language: Japanese
- Genres: Poetry, painting
- Literary movement: Surrealism, Dadaism, Avant-garde

Shūzō Takiguchi (瀧口 修造, Takiguchi Shūzō; December 7, 1903 – July 1, 1979) was a Japanese poet, art critic, and artist. He was a central figure in prewar and postwar Japanese Surrealism, helping introduce the movement through his 1930 translation of André Breton's Surrealism and Painting and through direct correspondence with Breton. He also published a 1940 monograph on Joan Miró that museum sources describe as the world's earliest monograph on the artist. He was also a key figure in the history of wartime repression directed at Japanese Surrealism: in 1941, he was arrested on suspicion of violating the Peace Preservation Law, and museum accounts note that he remained under police surveillance until the end of the war. Starting in the 1950s, he also supported younger postwar avant-garde artists through his work at Takemiya Gallery in Tokyo, where he was responsible for selecting artists and coordinating exhibitions from 1951 to 1957. In 1958, he served as commissioner for the Japan Pavilion at the 29th Venice Biennale and as a member of the international jury. Around 1960, he increasingly turned to his own visual practice, producing drawings, watercolors, decalcomanias, and other experimental works.

He was also recognized in international Surrealist circles: according to the Dalí Foundation, Takiguchi and Chirū Yamanaka were named in the 1938 Dictionnaire abrégé du surréalisme as "promoters of the surrealist movement in Japan".

His writings, artist books, and works have since entered the holdings of major international institutions including the Museum of Modern Art, the Metropolitan Museum of Art, the British Museum, and the Art Institute of Chicago. His posthumous reception has also included presentation in major international exhibition contexts, including Surrealism Beyond Borders, organized by The Met and Tate Modern, and a 1986–1987 programme at the Centre Pompidou in Paris.

== Early life and introduction to Surrealism ==
Born in Toyama Prefecture, Takiguchi moved to Tokyo in 1921. From 1926, he studied under Junzaburō Nishiwaki in the Department of English Literature at Keio University, where he developed an interest in Surrealism and began writing poetry.

In 1928, he helped launch the Surrealist periodical Ishō no taiyō (衣裳の太陽), an early publishing platform for Japanese Surrealism.

His translation of André Breton's Surrealism and Painting was published in 1930, after which he increasingly wrote on Surrealism and related visual art. According to the Metropolitan Museum of Art, Takiguchi "corresponded with André Breton" and translated texts related to Surrealism. Takiguchi was one of the poets who participated in Shi to shiron, a major modernist poetry magazine of the early Shōwa period.

Takiguchi also contributed to Ciné, the avant-garde poetry magazine founded by Chirū Yamanaka. Takiguchi was among the figures whom Kansuke Yamamoto came to know through Ciné. Getty scholarship describes both Takiguchi and Chirū Yamanaka as figures credited with fostering Surrealism in Japan.

== Prewar Surrealist activity and wartime repression ==
Among his early activities in Surrealism, in 1937, in collaboration with the poet Chirū (Tiroux) Yamanaka, he organised the traveling Kaigai Chōgenjitsushugi Sakuhin-ten (Exhibition of Overseas Surrealist Works) in the cities of Tokyo, Kyoto, Osaka and Nagoya. Yamanaka had made contact with and corresponded with French Surrealists André Breton and Paul Éluard, helping to promote international exchange around Surrealism. The exhibition introduced original Surrealist works to many Japanese audiences and left a lasting impression on the young poet-photographer Kansuke Yamamoto.

According to the Dalí Foundation, Takiguchi and Chiru Yamanaka were named in the 1938 Dictionnaire abrégé du surréalisme, published on the occasion of the Exposition Internationale du Surréalisme in Paris, as "promoters of the surrealist movement in Japan".

In later museum accounts, including the Tokyo section of the 2022 Tokyo Photographic Art Museum exhibition Avant-Garde Rising: The Photographic Vanguard in Modern Japan, Takiguchi was also identified as a founder of the Avant-Garde Photography Association in 1938 and described as its spiritual leader.

In the same period, Takiguchi also contributed a series of essays on avant-garde photography to Photo Times, including "Photography and Surrealism" and "A Trial Essay on Avant-Garde Photography" in 1938, helping to shape the magazine as a key forum for photographic Surrealism in Japan.

Takiguchi's prewar critical book Modern Art (1938) was later described by the Keio University Art Center as a benchmark for artists in the aftermath of World War II.

On 5 April 1941, Takiguchi was arrested together with the painter Ichiro Fukuzawa on suspicion of violating the Peace Preservation Law. The authorities suspected a connection between Surrealism and Communism, and the case has been described as one of the best-known incidents in the wartime repression of Japanese Surrealism. He was released in November 1941, but museum accounts note that he remained under police monitoring until the end of the war.

== Postwar avant-garde and later visual practice ==
In 1947, Takiguchi participated in the formation of the Japan Avant-Garde Artists Club, alongside critics and artists including Takachiyo Uemura, Kazuhiko Egawa, Nobuya Abe, Iwami Furusawa, Yoshio Komatsu, Masanari Murai, Tarō Okamoto, Kitawaki Noboru, and Ichiro Fukuzawa.

After the war, Takiguchi became closely involved with Takemiya Gallery in Tokyo. With full responsibility for selecting artists and coordinating exhibitions, he helped shape the gallery from its opening in June 1951 until its closure in April 1957, during which it hosted 208 solo and group exhibitions. Museum accounts describe Takemiya Gallery as an experimental space that showed both established prewar artists and younger figures, including members of Jikken Kōbō (Experimental Workshop), the postwar interdisciplinary group that Takiguchi helped christen and for which he served as a key mentor and promoter, as well as artists such as Ay-O, On Kawara, and Yayoi Kusama.

In 1952, he became an operating committee member at the National Museum of Modern Art, Tokyo.

In the 1950s, Takiguchi was also active as a critic writing on the open-call Yomiuri Indépendant Exhibition, further consolidating his role in the postwar Japanese avant-garde.

In 1956, Takiguchi also helped found the newly established Japan Subjective Photography League, a postwar framework through which prewar avant-garde photographers such as Kansuke Yamamoto were briefly regrouped alongside emerging postwar figures including Kiyoji Ōtsuji, Ikkō Narahara, and Yasuhiro Ishimoto in the First International Subjective Photography Exhibition later that year.

In 1958, Takiguchi served as commissioner for the Japan Pavilion at the 29th Venice Biennale and as a member of the international jury. After his official duties in Venice, he spent about four months traveling in Europe, mainly in Paris, during which he visited André Breton and Salvador Dalí.

In 1959, he was elected president of the Japanese section of the International Association of Art Critics (AICA Japan), and served in that role from 1960 to 1963.

Around 1960, he scaled back his critical writing and turned increasingly to his own visual practice, holding his first solo exhibition, ''From My Sketchbooks'', at Nantenshi Gallery in October 1960 and beginning the more sustained production of visual works that he referred to as ''dessins''. Throughout the 1960s and 1970s, he continued to present drawings, watercolors, decalcomanias, and other experimental works.

His later work also maintained strong international connections through artist books and collaborative projects, including Ma de Proverbis (1970) and En compagnie des étoiles de Miró (1978), both produced with Joan Miró. Later accounts have also emphasized his engagement with Marcel Duchamp, reflected in works such as To and From Rrose Sélavy (1968).

After Duchamp's death, Takiguchi also played a leading role in the creation of the Tokyo Version of The Large Glass, reflecting the long-standing relationship he had maintained with Duchamp.

== Legacy and archives ==
Takiguchi's papers, works, and related materials are now preserved across several major institutional collections. The Keio University Art Center holds the Shūzō Takiguchi collection, which comprises about 3,500 letters. The Artizon Museum, operated by the Ishibashi Foundation, holds 163 works by Takiguchi, including collaborations with other artists. At the Toyama Prefectural Museum of Art and Design, the Shuzo Takiguchi Collection developed in part from the museum's early relationship with Takiguchi and later expanded through a posthumous contribution by his wife of about 700 works and objects from his study.

Museum presentations have also emphasized Takiguchi's later idea of a "Shop of Objects", through which he pursued object-based works and collaborations with other artists from the 1960s onward.

The Museum of Modern Art in New York also holds works by Takiguchi; its online collection currently lists three works and records their inclusion in exhibitions including Tokyo 1955–1970: A New Avant-Garde (2012–2013) and From the Collection: 1960–1969 (2016–2017).

The Metropolitan Museum of Art's Thomas J. Watson Library holds Takiguchi's Album surréaliste (1937), and the museum highlighted both Takiguchi and the catalogue in connection with Surrealism Beyond Borders, a project organized by The Met and Tate Modern.

The Art Institute of Chicago also holds works by Takiguchi, including Self-Portrait of Duchamp for Shuzo Takiguchi, from To and From Rrose Sélavy (1967, published 1968).

Books authored by Takiguchi are also held by the British Museum, including Chicago, Chicago (1969) with photographs by Yasuhiro Ishimoto and Kamaitachi (1969) with photographs by Eikoh Hosoe.

At the Centre Pompidou in Paris, Takiguchi's graphic works were presented in the 1986–1987 programme Japon : Kotobaimai-Kakinuma-Takiguchi, organized in connection with the exhibition Japon des avant-gardes 1910-1970.

Works by Takiguchi are also held in major Japanese national museum collections, including the National Museum of Modern Art, Tokyo and the National Museum of Art, Osaka.

== Selected works ==
=== Poetry, criticism, and artist books ===
- Translation of André Breton's Surrealism and Painting, 1930
- Album surréaliste (special supplement of Mizue), with Chirū Yamanaka, 1937
- Modern Art, 1938
- Miró, 1940
- Fairy's Distance (妖精の距離, Yōsei no Kyori), 1937
- Marginalia, 1966
- Poetic Experiments by Shūzō Takiguchi 1927–1937, 1967
- To and From Rrose Sélavy, 1968
- Ma de Proverbis, with Joan Miró, 1970
- En compagnie des étoiles de Miró, with Joan Miró, 1978

=== Periodicals and publishing networks ===
- Contributor to Ciné, c. 1929

== See also ==
- Surrealism in Japan
- Kaigai Chōgenjitsushugi Sakuhinten
- Toshiko Okanoue
