= Kiyoji Ōtsuji =

Japanese photographer (1923–2001)

Kiyoji Ōtsuji (大辻 清司, Ōtsuji Kiyoji; 1923–2001) was a Japanese photographer, photography theorist, and educator. He was active in the avant-garde art world in Japan after World War II, both creating his own experimental photographs, and taking widely circulated documentary photographs of other artists and art projects. He became an authority in Japanese photography, extensively publishing commentaries and educating future generations of photographers.

== Biography ==
=== Early life: 1923–1945 ===
Ōtsuji was born in the Kōtō ward of Tokyo on July 27, 1923. He first became interested in photography when he purchased back issues of the photography periodical Photo Times from a used book store. Through Photo Times he first encountered avant-garde photography from Europe, the United States, and Japan, and was deeply inspired by the photography criticism of Shūzō Takiguchi and Abe Nobuya.

In 1942, Ōtsuji enrolled in the art department at the Tokyo Professional School of Photography (today Tokyo Polytechnic University). In 1943, in the middle of his studies, he was drafted into the army and trained as an aircraft mechanic. He later graduated from the Tokyo Professional School of Photography in 1944.

=== Early career: 1945–1952 ===
In 1945, after World War II, Ōtsuji returned to Tokyo and began work as a photographer at Takabayashi Studio, a photography studio run by Takabayashi Takafusa and Takabayashi Yasushi. In 1946, he met the artist Yoshishige Saitō, who invited him to join the magazine Katei Bunka (Home Culture). Ōtsuji worked as a staff photographer for Katei Bunka for one year. In 1947, he opened his own photography studio in Sendagaya, Tokyo.

In 1949, Ōtsuji joined the modernist exhibition society Bijutsu Bunka Kyōkai ("Art and Culture Association") and showed his photograph Itamashiki Buttai ("Painful Object"). The same year, he and other alumni from the Tokyo Professional School of Photography began to publish the magazine Fotogurafii ("Photography"), to which Ōtsuji contributed several written essays on photography.

Ōtsuji's early individual works are often viewed as a re-exploration of prewar Surrealist photography in Japan. Art historian Masachika Tani argues that Iwata Nakayama, Kansuke Yamamoto, and Ōtsuji each developed distinct possibilities for Surrealist photography, adapting Surrealist procedures to local conditions. For example, his work Aishi ni tsuite ("About Feet") (1949) captures a raw chicken positioned upside down with its legs dramatically crossed in mid-air, thus offering a strange, almost lifelike view of the dead animal. Another early series of photographs, shot in the leading Bijutsu Bunka member Nobuya Abe's studio in 1950, depict the future Jikken Kōbō member Hideko Fukushima and other women, both clothed and nude, posing within a geometric network of strings, thus appearing like dolls or puppets. Following these examples, for the rest of his career, Ōtsuji's individual work continued to explore the presence of objects (もの, mono) – ready-made or found objects – and to capture their ephemerality with his camera.

Additionally, Ōtsuji continued to take on contract jobs, including photographing the pianist Alfred Cortot during his visit to Japan.

=== Work with avant-garde groups: 1953–1959 ===
In 1953, Ōtsuji collaborated with the avant-garde art collective Jikken Kōbō on a project for the weekly graphic magazine Asahi Picture News, a serialized section of Asahi Graph. Each artist constructed a three-dimensional assemblage containing the letters "A," "P," and "N" and Ōtsuji photographed the object. Each photograph was printed as a small header in the top corner of the Asahi Picture News double-page spread. After this project, Ōtsuji joined the group as an official member. He contributed photographs made into autoslide projections for the 5th Experimental Workshop Presentation in 1953, and continued to photograph the group's events and rehearsals until they split up in 1957.

In 1953, Ōtsuji also joined Gurafikku Shudan ("Graphic Group"), a group of photographers and designers, with whom he exhibited photography and collaborated on publications and other projects. In 1955, Ōtsuji screened the experimental film Kine Calligraph at the 2nd Graphic Group Presentation. The film, produced with Yasuhiro Ishimoto and Saiko Tsuji, with a score by Tōru Takemitsu, involved painting directly onto film to create purely abstract effects. It was an early example of abstract film in Japan.

From 1956 to 1959, Ōtsuji worked as a part-time photographer for the art magazine Geijutsu Shinchō, contributing photographs for articles covering art, design, architecture, music, theater, dance and film. His photographs ranged from portraits of artists to documentation of performances, putting him in contact with some of the most prominent figures in the Japanese art world. He notably photographed works by Gutai members at the 2nd Gutai Art Exhibition in 1956, as well as Tatsumi Hijikata’s performances of Butoh, among other major events.

Throughout the 1950s, Ōtsuji continued to experiment both with photographic expression and with the photographic apparatus. In 1956, he took a series of close-up photographs of Lake Ōnuma, focusing on such images as slanted lines left behind on its frozen surface by ice skates. With none of the surrounding landscape depicted, the icy surface resembled gestural abstraction.

In 1956, Ōtsuji also participated in the newly founded Japan Subjective Photography League, a postwar framework through which prewar avant-garde photographers such as Kansuke Yamamoto were briefly regrouped alongside emerging figures such as Ikkō Narahara and Yasuhiro Ishimoto in the First International Subjective Photography Exhibition later that year.

He built his own camera and even devised a cinematic device called an "autoscope" that was used to project images at the Sekiya Industries booth at the Japan International Trade Fair in Tokyo in 1957.

=== Teaching, publishing, and writing: 1960s–1970s ===
Ōtsuji began to spend more time teaching in the 1960s. From 1960 to 1970, Ōtsuji was a lecturer at the Tokyo College of Photography. This was his first teaching position. He also lectured at the Musashino Art University in the 1960s, and was appointed a professor at Tokyo Zōkei University from 1967 to 1976. Ōtsuji became a professor at University of Tsukuba in 1976, where he taught until 1987.

Around 1965, Ōtsuji began to frequently contribute essays and articles to photography magazines such as Camera Mainichi, Camera Jidai, S D: Space Design, and Shashin Hihyō, among others. Throughout the 1960s and 1970s, he also continued to experiment with his individual works and publish them, often alongside his texts. In the 1970s, his published works became increasingly theoretical. A series of photographs for Asahi Camera, "Ōtsuji Kiyoji Experimental Workshop of Photography" (1975), featured both essays and photographs that considered the theoretical issues surrounding photography as a process and discipline. His series Hitohako no kako ("Past of One Tin Can") was created for his first solo exhibition in 1977, and featured a 23-photograph sequence showing a can of memories being unpacked and individual elements examined by the camera – including old photographs. The series can be seen as a prolonged meditation on the object, which had interested him since his early career.

Although no longer working on the staff of Geijutsu Shinchō, Ōtsuji continued to take on contract work for the magazine and others, including S D and Bijutsu Techō. He also began photographing artwork for books and exhibition catalogues, and continued to do so until late in his career.

In 1968, he famously coined the term konpora, derived from kontenporarī fotogurafī (contemporary photography), which he used to describe a certain type of documentary photography newly present in Japan that had affinities with the work of Western documentary photographers Robert Frank and Garry Winogrand. Exemplified by two photo books published in 1971 – Hibi (Day to Day) by Ōtsuji’s student Shigeo Gochō, and A Sentimental Journey by Araki Nobuyoshi – konpora photography’s clear, steady images were a contrasting response to the 'are-bure-boke' ( 'grainy/rough, blurry, out-of-focus') style of documentary photography published in Provoke. Instead of Provoke’s negative, anti-establishment attitude, konpora photographers attempted to capture the world dispassionately, with simple, straightforward snapshots of commonplace, ordinary subjects.

By the 1970s, Ōtsuji’s authority in the Japanese photography world had solidified, and in addition to publishing frequently, he was asked to become a regular guest in a series of roundtable discussions published in Asahi Camera titled "Roundtable: On Talked-About Photographs," where he was joined by other prominent photographers. He participated in these discussions in 1974, from 1976 to 1978, and again in 1985.

Ōtsuji's students include Yutaka Takanashi, Shinzō Shimao, Tokuko Ushioda, Shigeo Gochō and Naoya Hatakeyama.

=== Later career: 1980s–2001 ===
After leaving University of Tsukuba in 1987, Ōtsuji was a professor at Kyushu Sangyō University until 1996. He spent the later decades continuing to publish his photographs and essays widely, but his contract work decreased and he began to show his own works in such prominent venues as the Tokyo Metropolitan Museum of Photography, the Chiba City Museum of Art, Meguro Museum of Art, Tokyo, and others. In the last few years of his life, an initiative was established to preserve his negatives, and he received recognition through several major solo exhibitions and the publication of the photo book Kiyoji Ōtsuji (Japanese Photographers 21) by Iwanami Shoten in 1999.

== Selected solo and group exhibitions ==
- VIVI exhibition, Maruzen Gallery, Nagoya, 1949.
- 9th–12th Bijutsu Bunka Exhibitions, Tokyo Metropolitan Art Museum, 1949–1952
- Ogawa Yoshikazu and Ōtsuji Kiyoji Two-Man Show, Takemiya Gallery, Tokyo, 1952
- The 5th Experimental Workshop Presentation, Daiichi Seimei Hall, Tokyo, 1953
- 1st–3rd Graphic Group Exhibitions, Matsuya Department Store, Ginza, 1953, 1955–1956; 4th Graphic Group Exhibition, Konishiroku Gallery, Tokyo, 1956
- From Space to Environment, Matsuya Department Store, Ginza, Tokyo, 1966
- Past of One Tin Can, Prism, Tokyo, 1977
- Exhibition Ōtsuji Kiyoji, Tokyo Gallery, Tokyo, 1987
- Ōtsuji Kiyoji 1948–1987 Exhibition, University of Tsukuba Gallery, Tsukuba, 1987
- The Age of Modernism, Tokyo Metropolitan Museum of Photography, 1995
- Ōtsuji Kiyoji Portfolio, Mole, Tokyo, 1997
- Kiyoji Ōtsuji Retrospective: Experimental Workshop of Photography, National Film Center, National Museum of Modern Art, Tokyo, 1999
- Kiyoji Ōtsuji and Fifteen Photographers, Tokyo Zōkei University Yokoyama Memorial Manzu Art Museum, Tokyo, 1999
- Kiyoji Ōtsuji: Shūzō Takiguchi & Yoshishige Saitō on Photo, Museum of Modern Art, Toyama, 2003
- Kiyoji Ōtsuji: Photographs as Collaborations, Shoto Museum of Art, Tokyo, 2007
- APN Research, Kunsthalle Bern, 2012
- Kiyoji Ōtsuji "Photographic Archive": The Traces of the Photographer and the Art of His Era 1940–1980, Musashino Art University Museum & Library, Tokyo, 2012
- Gutai: Splendid Playground, Solomon R. Guggenheim Museum, New York, 2013
- Jikken Kōbō: Experimental Workshop, Museum of Modern Art, Kamakura, 2013
- Ōtsuji Kiyoji, Taka Ishii Gallery, Tokyo, 2013
- For a New World to Come: Experiments in Japanese Art and Photography, 1968–1979, Museum of Fine Arts, Houston, 2015
- Japanese Photography from Postwar to Now, SF MoMA, San Francisco, 2016

== Collections and archives ==
Ōtsuji’s photographic archives are held by the Musashino Art University Museum & Library. Prints of his photographs are also held in the collections of the National Museum of Modern Art, Tokyo, the Tate Modern, the Museum of Modern Art, SF MoMA, and M+ Hong Kong.

== Sources ==
- Obinata Kin’ichi, ed. 大辻清司 武蔵野美術大学美術館・図書館所蔵作品目錄 = Ōtsuji Kiyoji: Photographs in the Collection of the Musashino Art University Museum & Library. Tokyo: Musashino Bijutsu Daigaku Bijutsukan + Toshokan, 2016.
- The National Museum of Modern Art, Tokyo, ed. 大辻清司写真実験室 = Kiyoji Ohtsuji retrospective--experimental workshop of photography. Tokyo: Tōkyō Kokuritsu Kindai Bijutsukan, 1999.
- Nakamori Yasufumi, ed. For a New World To Come: Experiments in Japanese art and photography, 1968–1979. Houston: The Museum of Fine Arts Houston, 2015.
