= Yasuhiro Ishimoto =

Japanese-American photographer

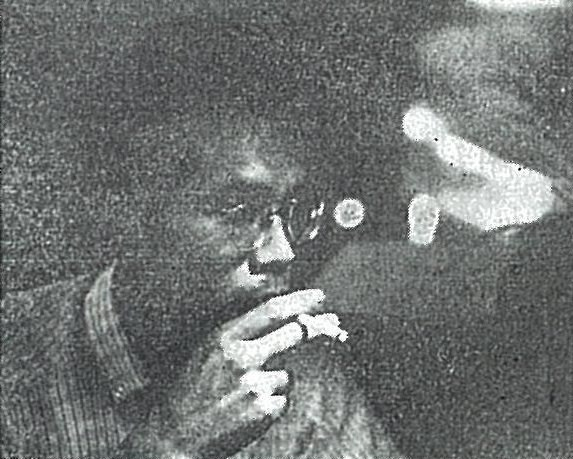
- Born: June 14, 1921; San Francisco, California
- Died: February 6, 2012 (aged 90); Tokyo, Japan
- Occupation: Photographer

Academic background
- Education: Illinois Institute of Technology

Academic work
- Discipline: Photography
- Institutions: Tokyo Zokei University; Tokyo College of Photography

Yasuhiro Ishimoto (石元 泰博, Ishimoto Yasuhiro; June 14, 1921 – February 6, 2012) was a Japanese-American photographer. His decades-long career explored expressions of modernist design in traditional architecture, the quiet anxieties of urban life in Tokyo and Chicago, and the camera's capacity to bring out the abstract in the everyday and seemingly concrete fixtures of the world around him.

Born in the United States and raised in Japan, Ishimoto returned to the States as a young adult as the Second World War began to escalate, and was soon after sent to the Amache Internment Camp in Colorado after the signing of Executive Order 9066. After the war, he studied photography at the Bauhaus-inspired Institute of Design (ID) at the Illinois Institute of Technology, and established a robust photographic practice between the United States and Japan.

As a transnational interlocutor between Japanese and American art and architecture circles, Ishimoto played a prominent role in bringing visions of Japanese architectural modernism to audiences abroad. His photographs of the Katsura Imperial Villa, taken in 1953-54 and published in 1960 as Katsura: Tradition and Creation in Japanese Architecture, were widely celebrated in architecture and design circles for evoking the formal, geometric purity of the villa’s structural details with a deep sensitivity towards the atmospheric qualities of the space. The book, which features accompanying essays by Kenzō Tange and Walter Gropius, was instrumental in stimulating the discourse surrounding modernism’s relationship to tradition in Japanese architecture.

Ishimoto’s work was exhibited widely in the United States and Japan during his lifetime, and two of his photographs were featured in the monumental 1955 Museum of Modern Art exhibition The Family of Man. He maintained close ties to Chicago and published a series titled Chicago, Chicago in 1969. In tandem with his architectural photographs, Ishimoto was a prolific recorder of everyday life. His photographs of streetscapes and ordinary people captured the candor, anxiety, paradoxes, and joy of modern urban life through a sensitive and deliberate lens.

== Biography ==
=== Early life ===
Ishimoto was born on June 14, 1921, in San Francisco, California, to Ishimoto Toma and Yoshine, who both hailed from Takaoka-cho, or present-day Tosa, in Kōchi Prefecture, Japan. His father had come to the U.S. in 1904 at the age of 17 seeking agricultural work, eventually finding success as a salt farmer in California. In 1924, the family left the United States and returned to his parents' hometown in Kochi. Ishimoto attended Nada Narukawa Elementary School (now Tosa City Takaoka Daini Elementary School) and Kōchi Agricultural High School, where he was a competitive middle- and long-distance runner and participated in races at the national level at Meiji Jingu Gaien Stadium.

After graduating from high school, he returned to the United States in 1939 to study modern agricultural methods at the behest of his parents and teachers. Ishimoto first lived with a Japanese farmer friend of his father, before moving in with an American family in Oakland, California and attending an elementary school to learn English. He continued to study at Washington Union High School in Fremont and San Jose Junior College (now San Jose City College), while working on a farm over the summers. In January 1942, he enrolled in the University of California, Berkeley, School of Agriculture (now the University of California, Davis). His studies were cut short, however, as the war in the Pacific quickly escalated. On February 19, 1942, president Franklin D. Roosevelt signed Executive Order 9066, authorizing the mass incarceration of Japanese Americans across the west coast.

=== Internment and post-war education (1942-53) ===
On May 21, 1942, Ishimoto was forcibly sent to the Merced Assembly Center in central California before being transferred to the Granada War Relocation Center, or Camp Amache, in Colorado, where he was assigned to work as a firefighter. It was at the camp that Ishimoto first learned how to use a camera and develop film in the darkroom from fellow incarcerated Japanese Americans. Though cameras had initially been confiscated by authorities, by May 1943 restrictions on cameras had lifted in camps outside of the Western Defense Command (including Amache), and Ishimoto began taking photographs around the camp using a Kodak 35mm camera. Ishimoto and his fellow photographs used creative solutions to work through the technological limitations in the camp, recalling how his friend fashioned an enlarger from a ketchup container and the bellows from a folding camera.

After being granted temporary permission to leave the camp and visit Illinois in January 1944, Ishimoto was twice questioned about his responses in the loyalty questionnaire before being officially released from the camp in December 1944. The War Relocation Authority had established its first resettlement office in Chicago, with the express goal of dispersing Japanese Americans from the west coast in order to weaken the strength of ethnic enclaves and diminish their allegiance to Japan. Thus, Ishimoto found himself in Chicago, where he worked for silkscreen company Color Graphics (another skill he had picked up in the camps). In 1946, he entered Northwestern University to study architecture. Though he dropped out shortly after enrolling, architecture would hold an important place in his photographic practice.

The following year, Ishimoto joined the Fort Dearborn Camera Club through the introduction of Japanese-American photographer Harry K. Shigeta, who co-founded the organization in 1924. Many of the club members still adhered to the late 19th-, early 20th century conventions of pictorialism, which sought to replicate the painterly qualities of pictorial art through photography. At the same time, Ishimoto encountered avant-garde publications such as György Kepes' The Language of Vision and László Moholy-Nagy’s Vision in Motion, both of which had a profound impact on Ishimoto's thinking on the perceptual dimensions of the visual world and the structural qualities of the built and natural environments.

==== Institute of Design (1948-52) ====
In 1948, following the encouragement of Shigeta, Ishimoto enrolled in the Institute of Design (ID) of the Illinois Institute of Technology, otherwise known as the "New Bauhaus." Founded by Moholy-Nagy in 1937, the school brought the pedagogical spirit of the Bauhaus to Chicago through its similar foundational interdisciplinary course and orientation towards human-centric design. Moholy-Nagy shifted the craft-based distinctions entrenched in the German institution, which served to enhance gendered perceptions and discrimination, and instead split the school into three departments—architecture, product design, and light workshop (advertising arts).

In his teaching, Moholy-Nagy encouraged students to treat light as a "raw material," subject to experimentation and manipulation through carefully calibrated engagements with chemicals, atmospheric conditions, surfaces, camera settings, and spatial arrangements—an orientation that would percolate into Ishimoto's deliberate and meticulous arrangements of light and form in his architectural photographs. Ishimoto studied with photographers such as Aaron Siskind, Gordon Coster, and Harry M. Callahan. In comparison to his fellow instructors, Callahan was less interested in the theoretical dimensions of photography, and instead encouraged his students to go out into the city and take a more freeform approach to photographing whatever interested them most. While at the ID, Ishimoto struck up a lasting friendship with fellow student Marvin E. Newman. The two frequently explored and photographed the neighborhoods of Chicago together, and created a short film titled The Church on Maxwell Street, which took as its subject an African-American outdoor revival meeting.

Ishimoto's time at the ID instilled in him a range of technical and artistic ways of seeing, from the Bauhaus attitudes of avant-garde experimentalism and engagement with geometric principles, to Siskind's documentary vision, to Callahan's more subjective, instinct-driven practice, all of which played a role in shaping his orientation towards photography in the decades to follow.

=== Death and legacy ===
After returning to Japan in 1961, Ishimoto became a naturalized Japanese citizen in 1968. He taught photography at Kuwasawa Design School (1962–66) the Tokyo College of Photography (1962-66) at Tokyo Zokei University (1966–71).

Ishimoto died at the age of 90 on February 6, 2012, after being hospitalized the month before for a stroke.

Ishimoto's many accolades include winning the Life magazine Young Photographer's Contest (1951); the Japan Photo Critics Association photographer of the year award (1957); the Mainichi Art Award (1970); the annual award (1978, 1990) and distinguished contribution award (1991) of the Photographic Society of Japan; and the Kochi prefectural cultural award (1996). In 1996, the Japanese government named Ishimoto a Person of Cultural Merit. In English, Yasuhiro Ishimoto signed his name "Yas Ishimoto" (see examples).

== Artwork ==
=== Katsura (1953-58) ===
While at the ID, Callahan introduced Ishimoto to renowned photography and curator Edward Steichen, who aided in opening up new professional avenues for the burgeoning photographer's career. Steichen featured two of Ishimoto's images for the landmark Family of Man exhibition at the Museum of Modern Art in 1955 and its accompanying catalogue. One of the images, which was featured in a section of the exhibition on children, was a slightly blurry photograph of a young girl with her wrists bound behind her back and tied to a tree. Though presumably captured in the midst of a playful game, the image carries with it a somewhat unnerving tone that alludes to Ishimoto's resistance against excessive sentimentalism. Steichen also selected Ishimoto to be part of a group show of twenty-five emerging photographers in 1953, followed by a three-person exhibition at MoMA in 1961.

In 1954, Ishimoto held his first solo exhibition at Gallery Takemiya, a prominent avant-garde art space in Kanda, Tokyo run by poet and art critic Shūzō Takiguchi. He was also featured in the National Museum of Modern Art, Tokyo's first exhibition on photography in 1953, a group show titled The Exhibition of Contemporary Photography: Japan and America (Gendai shashin-ten: Nihon to Amerika), alongside established figures such as Ansel Adams, Berenice Abbott, Walker Evans, and John Szarkowski. The exhibition not only marked a new shift in the Japanese art world in terms of medium, but also participated in the production of post-occupation cultural discourse between the United States and Japan, within which Ishimoto was now fully immersed.

In October 1956, Ishimoto and his wife Kawamata Shigeru were married at the International House of Japan (Kokusai bunka kaikan), in a ceremony overseen by Sōfū Teshigahara and Kenzō Tange. The two had met at a Sōgetsu-ryū study group, where she was an instructor and assistant to Teshigahara. Shigeru would continue to support Yasuhiro as an assistant and producer throughout his career. In the same year, Ishimoto's work was also shown in the First International Subjective Photography Exhibition at Nihonbashi Takashimaya in Tokyo, held in the same postwar moment that the newly founded Japan Subjective Photography League briefly brought emerging photographers such as Ishimoto, Kiyoji Ōtsuji, and Ikkō Narahara into a shared field of reference with prewar avant-garde figures including Kansuke Yamamoto.

==== Katsura Imperial Villa ====
Steichen introduced Ishimoto to MoMA architecture curator Arthur Drexler, who in 1953 tasked Ishimoto, along with architect Junzō Yoshimura, to guide him through Japan to conduct research for his 1954 exhibition "Japanese Exhibition House." It was during this trip that Ishimoto visited the Katsura Imperial Villa (Katsura rikyū) in Kyoto for the first time. Struck by the seventeenth-century villa's resonance with the geometries and compositional structures he encountered in his New Bauhaus education, Ishimoto brought his photos to Kenzō Tange, who saw in them a similar capacity to deconstruct and depict in lucid detail the aspects of premodern design that he believed formed the foundation of postwar modernist architecture. Designed and constructed over a fifty-year period under the auspices of Prince Toshihito and Prince Toshitada of the Hachijō-no-miya family, the villa complex consists of a series of aristocratic dwellings built in the shoin style, along with four tea-ceremony houses built in the sukiya style, and a Buddhist hall surrounded by a lavish and carefully curated garden. Architect Arata Isozaki described the complex as an "assemblage" of layered styles and varied construction methods, which made it a source of great intrigue and inspiration for architects throughout the 19th and early 20th century.

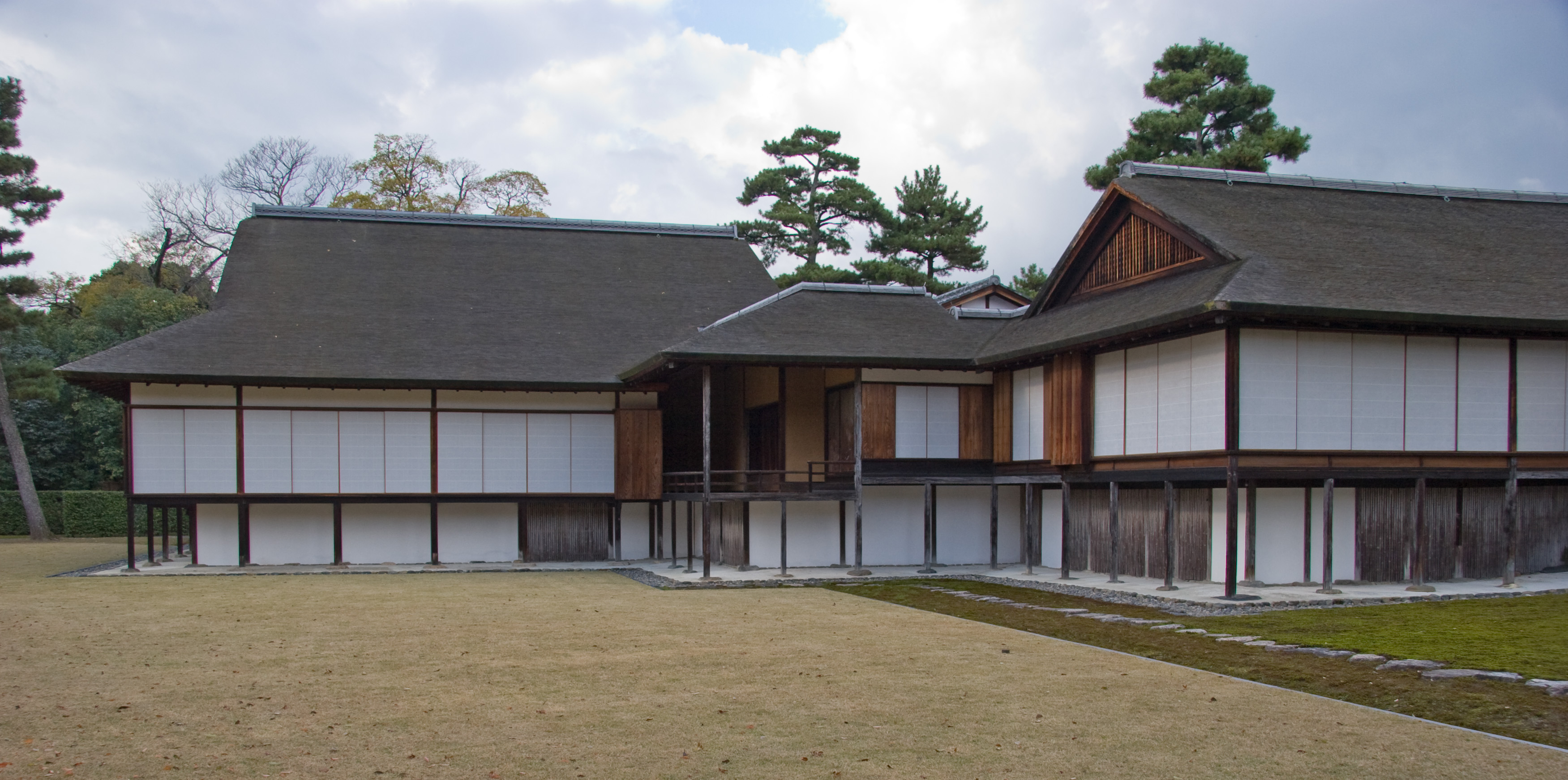
Katsura Villa

Ishimoto returned to Katsura the following year, and was granted permission by the imperial household to photograph the site for the full month of May, between the designated hours of 9:00 a.m and 4:30 p.m. His access to the codified space (considering the little time that had elapsed since the American occupation of Japan) was made possible in part due to his American passport. Many of the images Ishimoto took using his 4x5 Linhof, he recalled, were shot on an up-to-date format that was not widely recognized in postwar Japan, leading to many of the negatives becoming ruined during the development process. The photographs thus emerged at a time of immense flux and cultural reinvention, with Ishimoto himself occupying a social and political threshold that enabled him with both physical access and a distinct visual perspective.

Ishimoto honed in on structural and environmental details instead of capturing more conventional views of the architecture and garden as a whole. His black-and-white images reveal the strong orthographic formalisms of the shoji and fusuma sliding doors, delicate interplays between light and shadow, the textural impressions of the wooden beams, moss, bamboo, and other natural elements, and the curated naturalism of features such as the stepping stones in the garden, which were aligned to be ever so slightly askew. The stones were a particularly arresting visual feature for Ishimoto, who expressed being in awe of the fact that they did not merely indicate avenues of movement, but rather that "their placement is carefully thought out, in a sense [to accommodate] the angle for a certain way of walking, to psychologically guide people to other parts of the garden or the next building, to create an atmosphere."

The photographer was approached by the publisher David-sha and editor Hideo Kobayashi in 1954, and initially planned to publish a straightforward photobook of his images of the site. Over the course of the editing process, however, Tange, who Ishimoto had invited to contribute an essay, eventually became the de facto editor and publicist of the book, taking on a prominent role in the selection, cropping, order, and arrangement of the images in ways that set forth his own ideas surrounding the dialectical forces of tradition and modernity inherent in the villa. Tange cropped and grouped images to emphasize the presence of modular units in both built and natural elements (often against the wishes of Ishimoto), and coordinated them against a white background to accentuate rectilinearity and suffuse the publication with a sense of rhythmic order.

After an extended, and at times fraught, editing process, which also involved the participation of Herbert Bayer as book designer, Katsura: Tradition and Creation in Japanese Architecture (sometimes shortened to Katsura) was published in 1960, featuring an introduction by Walter Gropius and an essay by Tange. The book had a resounding impact on architects in both Japan and abroad, fueling the ongoing ideological discourse and debates surrounding the characteristics of Japanese postwar architecture, and presenting a radical view of a previously tightly regulated traditional structure during a period of intense social and cultural upheaval in Japan.

==== Katsura revisited (1981-82) ====
From 1976 to 1982, the Imperial Household Ministry conducted a rigorous renovation of the Katsura complex's largest residential structure, the Goten. After receiving a commission from publisher Iwanami Shoten, Ishimoto revisited the site in November 1981 and February 1982, this time photographing the villa in both black-and-white and color using a Sinar camera with a variety of lenses. The color images were published as Katsura Villa: Space and Form in 1983 with Iwanami Shoten in Japan, and in 1987 with Rizzoli in the United States, and both the appearance of the villa and layout of the book differed significantly from the 1960 version edited by Tange. The second publication, for which Arata Isozaki provided substantial input and contributed an essay, featured images that were far more expansive in their framing, embraced ornamentation and chromatic diversity, and considered design details within their architectural contexts rather than highlighting them through isolation. Isozaki described Ishimoto's new approach to Katsura as a "de-modernist" vision, presenting the centuries-old villa in an altogether transformed field of vision that embraces the coexistence of varied, heterodox elements sharing the same environment.

=== Architecture ===
Following the publication of Katsura: Tradition and Creation in Japanese Architecture, Ishimoto would continue to photograph architectural buildings across the world, maintaining his keen interest in the atmospheric qualities of space and the intimations of structural detail. He received a commission to retrace the spread of Islam beginning in Córdoba, Spain, and traversed across Asia to Fatehpur Sikri, India, and Xi'an, China. The results of the journey were published as Islam: Space and Continent in 1980.Ishimoto maintained close relations with many modern architects, including Kenzo Tange, Arata Isozaki, and Hiroshi Naito, and photographed many of their buildings. In 1974, he photographed the work of early 20th-century architects Charles Sumner Greene and Henry Mather Greene of Greene and Greene in California for the Japanese design magazine Approach.

In 1993, Ishimoto was invited to photograph Ise Grand Shrine during the 61st iteration of the ceremonial dismantling and rebuilding process, which takes place every twenty years. Ishimoto took cues from the series of architectural details photographed by Yoshio Watanabe in 1953, accentuating the lucid forms of the eaves and posts. In contrast to Watanabe, who captured his images at late afternoon to create a more dramatic aura using stark contrasts of light and shadow, Ishimoto opted to work under even midday lighting, infusing the setting with a softer and more brooding air.

=== Chicago and street photography ===
==== Early postwar work in Chicago ====
Ishimoto's arrival in Chicago following the war took place alongside the second great migration of African Americans to the north. Chicago was only second to New York City in the number of new residents received in both migrations. As Jasmine Alinder suggests, Ishimoto's photographs of newly settled African Americans in Chicago from the rural south to the urban north mirror his own patterns of relocation first from rural Japan, to the west coast, and eventually to the shared ground of the urban north. Ishimoto's own experiences of facing anti-Japanese discrimination, both in the camps and Chicago, may also be read as informing his sensitivity towards the plight of disenfranchised communities, and his steadfast desire to immerse himself in the nooks and crannies of the urban landscape.

Many of Ishimoto's early photos in Chicago focus on children across varied neighborhoods, capturing the reckless vigor of their play, their urban stomping grounds, and their unflinching, and at times impenetrable gazes towards the camera with a frankness that was neither sentimental nor sardonic. In 1958, he published his first photobook, Someday Somewhere, which featured images of Chicago and Tokyo in conversation with one another, using strategies of arrangement and seriality that could be traced back to his training at the Institute of Design.

==== Second stay in Chicago (1958-61) ====
In December 1958, Ishimoto, whose Japanese visa was close to expiry, returned to Chicago with his wife Shigeru on a fellowship from camera maker Chiyoda Kōgaku Kōgyō (now Konica Minolta). Though they had initially planned on staying for a year, they extended their stay to three years and settled in the North Side, during which Ishimoto roamed the streets of the city, taking over 60,000 photographs. The works from this period were featured in a number of Japanese magazines and exhibited at the Nihonbashi Shirokiya department store in 1962. In 1969, they were published by Bijustsu shuppan-sha as Chicago, Chicago, featuring accompanying texts written by Harry Callahan and Shūzō Takiguchi.

The book design was conducted by Yūsaku Kamekura, and the 210 images were printed using a duotone relief process, which provided a richness to the dark tones and shadows captured in his street shots. The book captures the radical urban upheaval taking place in the late 1950s and early 60s in Chicago, with images that juxtapose the demolition of pre-war buildings against new modernist high-rises and public housing projects, and sensitively capture the intricacies of racial and political tensions as they manifested in public space . Ishimoto also immersed himself in allies and parades, and captured a dynamic image of Martin Luther King Jr. amidst an impassioned speech at a 1960 convention, flanked by a row of floating posters protesting against segregation in schools. Ishimoto was also the subject of a solo exhibition at the Art Institute of Chicago in 1960.

=== Color photography ===
Though perhaps best known for his black-and-white work in Katsura and Chicago, Chicago, Ishimoto had begun experimenting with color photography since his days at the ID, and he began to utilize it more heavily later in his career.

During his second stay in Chicago, Ishimoto began experimenting with multiple exposures in color film, overlapping silhouettes with colored filters to create abstracted, transparent forms that were subject to the whims of photographic chance and inevitability. These techniques were later utilized in his series Color and Form (Iro to Katachi) (2003), an examination of the sensuous and abstracted forms of various types of flora.

==== Mandalas of the Two Worlds (1976) ====
In 1973, he photographed hundreds of Buddhist deities depicted in the Mandalas of the Two Worlds (Ryōkai Mandala) preserved inside the Tō-ji temple (also known as Kyō-ō-gokoku-ji) in Kyoto. By using color film and flash, Ishimoto captured the vibrant tones and intricate details of works that were typically kept in darkness for conservation purposes. His experience photographing the mandalas intensified his interests in the presence of tradition in contemporary life, and played a part in shifting his earlier penchant for "subtractive" beauty (reflected in his austere photographs of Katsura) towards an aesthetic mode that embraced the seemingly contradictory forces of the world and instead read them as co-constitutive and mutually interdependent—a way of thought shaped by the tenets of esoteric Buddhism

Ishimoto expressed the following reflections on the mandalas' effect on his attitude towards photographic vision: “Photographers tend to pick up the good things and push everything else out of the frame. But with the mandala Buddhas, the mandalas boldly affirm the lowly elements of human existence instead of excising them when attempting to achieve enlightenment. Instead of cutting out the bad things, I came to think that the framed space instead needed to be a condensed version of everything.” The photographs were published by Heibonsha in 1977 as a special boxed collectors' edition titled The Mandalas of the Two Worlds: The Legend of Shingon-in, and featured in a traveling exhibition organized by the Seibu Museum of Art and designed by Ikko Tanaka.

==== "Food Journal/Wrapped Foods" ====
In "Food Journal/Wrapped Foods" (Shokumotsushi/Tsutsumareta shokumotsu) (1984), Ishimoto photographed everyday food items from the supermarket, accentuating the strangeness of fish and vegetables stretching against plastic wrap and styrofoam by highlighting the intense chromatic qualities of his subjects against stark black backgrounds, and casting them in a blue-green tone that recalled the clinical appearance of x-ray radiographs . The series also calls attention to the rise of mass consumerism in 1980s Japan, and the anxieties that Ishimoto, as someone who grew up in a working-class family during an era of scarcity, felt with regards to the loss of distinctiveness and food safety that came in tandem with rapid industrial and commercial growth.

== Exhibitions ==
=== Solo exhibitions ===
- Ishimoto Yasuhiro Photo Exhibition, Gallery Takemiya, Tokyo, 1954
- Chicago, Chicago, Nihonbashi Shirokiya, Tokyo, 1962
- Mandalas of the Two Worlds, Seibu Museum of Art, Tokyo, 1977
- Machi - Hito - Katachi [Cities - people - shapes], P.G.I, Tokyo, 1986
- Yasuhiro Ishimoto, Rencontres d'Arles festival, France, 1994
- Yasuhiro Ishimoto: Remembrance of Things Present, National Museum of Modern Art, Tokyo, 1996
- Ishimoto Yasuhiro-ten: Shikago, Tōkyō (石元泰博展 シカゴ、東京) / Yasuhiro Ishimoto: Chicago and Tokyo, Tokyo Metropolitan Museum of Photography, Tokyo, 1998
- Yasuhiro Ishimoto: A Tale of Two Cities, Art Institute of Chicago, 1999
- Yasuhiro Ishimoto: Mandalas of the Two Worlds at the Kyoo Gokokuji, National Museum of Art, Osaka, Osaka, 1999
- Yasuhiro Ishimoto Photographs: Traces of Memory, Cleveland Museum of Art, 2000–2001
- Ishimoto Yasuhiro Shashinten 1946–2001 (石元泰博写真展 1946–2001) / Yasuhiro Ishimoto, The Museum of Art, Kōchi, Kōchi, Japan, 2001
- Tokyo: Yasuhiro Ishimoto, Canadian Centre for Architecture, Montreal, 2012
- Yasuhiro Ishimoto: Bilingual Photography and the Architecture of Greene & Greene, the Huntington, San Marino, 2016
- Yasuhiro Ishimoto: Someday, Chicago, DePaul Art Museum, Chicago, 2018

=== Select group exhibitions ===
- The Family of Man, Museum of Modern Art, New York, 1955
- NON, Matsuya, Tokyo, 1962
- Japanese Industry, Japan Pavilion, 1964 New York World's Fair (photomurals)
- Photography in the Twentieth Century, National Gallery of Canada, 1967
- New Japanese Photography, Museum of Modern Art, New York, 1974
- The Photographer and the City, Art Institute of Chicago, 1977
- Eight Japanese Photographers, P.G.I, Tokyo, 1988
- water, 21 21 Design Sight, Tokyo, 2007

== Collections ==
Ishimoto's family donated 34,753 prints, approximately 100,000 negatives and 50,000 positives, along with correspondences, camera equipment, and other archival materials to the Museum of Art, Kōchi. On June 14, 2013, the museum established the Ishimoto Yasuhiro Photo Center in order to foster continued preservation efforts and encourage further research on the photographer's work.

Ishimoto's work is also held in numerous major museum collections, including the National Museum of Modern Art, Tokyo, the Tokyo Photographic Art Museum, Kawasaki City Museum, Yamaguchi Prefectural Art Museum, Yokohama Museum of Art, Musashino Art University, Tokyo Polytechnic University, the Museum of Modern Art, the Museum of Fine Arts, Houston, the Art Institute of Chicago, the Nelson-Atkins Museum of Art, the George Eastman Museum, and the Bauhaus Archive.

== Publications ==
=== Photobooks by Ishimoto ===
- Aru hi aru tokoro (ある日ある所) / Someday somewhere. Geibi Shuppansha, 1958. Tuttle, 1959.
- Katsura: Nihon kenchiku ni okeru dentō to sōzō (桂 日本建築における伝統と創造) / Katsura: Tradition and Creation in Japanese Architecture. Zōkeisha and Yale University Press, 1960. Second edition (without English text): Tokyo: Chūōkōronsha, 1971. English-language edition: New Haven: Yale University Press, 1972. ISBN 0-300-01599-2
- Shikago, Shikago (シカゴ、シカゴ) / Chicago, Chicago. Tokyo: Bijutsu Shuppansha, 1969. Second edition Tokyo: Japan Publications, 1983. ISBN 0-87040-553-5
- Toshi (都市, "City"). Tokyo: Chūōkōronsha, 1971.
- (With Haruo Tomiyama.) Ningen kakumei no kiroku (人間革命の記録) / The Document of Human Revolution. Tokyo: Shashin Hyōronsha, 1973.
- Nōmen (能面, "Noh masks"). Tokyo: Heibonsha, 1974.
- Den Shingonin Ryōkai Mandara (伝真言院両界曼荼羅) / The Mandalas of the Two Worlds. Tokyo: Heibonsha, 1977. Photographs on folded screens, lavishly produced and packed in two very large boxes. (An edition of 500, priced at 880,000 yen.)
- Eros und Cosmos in Mandala: The Mandalas of the Two Worlds at the Kyoo Gokoku-ji. Seibu Museum of Art.
- Den Shingon in mandara (伝真言院曼荼羅). Kyoto: Sanburaito Shuppan, 1978.
- Kunisaki kikō (国東紀行, "Kunisaki travelogue"). Nihon no Bi. Tokyo: Shūeisha, 1978. A large-format collection of colour photographs of the Kunisaki peninsula in Kyūshū.
- Karesansui no niwa (枯山水の庭, "Dry gardens"). Tokyo: Kōdansha, 1980.
- Yamataikoku gensō (邪馬台国幻想). Nihon no Kokoro. Tokyo: Shūeisha, 1980.
- Isuramu: Kūkan to mon'yō (イスラム：空間と文様) / Islam: Space and Design. Kyoto: Shinshindō, 1980.
- Kōkoku no jūichimen kannon (湖国の十一観音). Tokyo: Iwanami, 1982.
- Shikago, Shikago: Sono 2 (シカゴ、シカゴ その２) / Chicago, Chicago. Tokyo: Libro Port, 1983. ISBN 978-4-8457-0098-1.
- Shikago, Shikago: Sono 2 (シカゴ、シカゴ その２) / Chicago, Chicago. Tokyo: Canon, 1983. More black and white photographs of Chicago. No captions; foreword and chronology of the photographer in Japanese.
- Katsura rikyū: Kūkan to katachi (桂離宮 空間と形). Tokyo: Iwanami, 1983. English translation: Katsura Villa: Space and Form. New York: Rizzoli, 1987.
- Hana (花) / Hana. Tokyo: Kyūryūdō, 1988. ISBN 4-7630-8804-1. English edition: Flowers, San Francisco: Chronicle, 1989. ISBN 0-87701-668-2.
- Kyō no tewaza: Takumi-tachi no emoyō (京の手わざ：匠たちの絵模様). Tokyo: Gakugei Shorin, 1988. ISBN 4-905640-14-8.
- The Photography of Yasuhiro Ishimoto: 1948–1989. Tokyo: Seibu Museum of Art, 1989.
- Ishimoto Yasuhiro Shashinten 1946–2001 (石元泰博 1946–2001) / Yasuhiro Ishimoto. Kōchi, Kōchi: The Museum of Art, Kochi, 2001. Text in Japanese and English.
- Arata Isozaki Works 30: Architectural Models, Prints, Drawings. Gingko, 1992. ISBN 4-89737-139-2.
- Ise Jingū (伊勢神宮, "Ise shrine"). Tokyo: Iwanami, 1995. ISBN 4-00-008061-X.
- Genzai no kioku (現在の記憶) / Remembrance of Things Present. Tokyo: National Museum of Modern Art, 1996. Catalogue of an exhibition held at the National Film Center in 1996. Captions and text in both Japanese and English.
- Ishimoto Yasuhiro (石元泰博). Nihon no Shashinka. Tokyo: Iwanami, 1997. ISBN 4-00-008366-X. A compact survey of Ishimoto's monochrome work; text in Japanese only.
- Yasuhiro Ishimoto: A Tale of Two Cities. Ed. Colin Westerbeck. Chicago: Art Institute of Chicago, 1999. ISBN 0-86559-170-9. Catalogue of an exhibition at the Art Institute of Chicago, May–September 1999.
- Toki (刻) / Moment. Tokyo: Heibonsha, 2004. ISBN 4-00-008366-X. A survey of Ishimoto's monochrome work; text in Japanese and English.
- Shibuya, Shibuya (シブヤ、シブヤ). Tokyo: Heibonsha, 2007. ISBN 978-4-582-27764-7. Monochrome images, mostly of the backs of individual people waiting for the lights to change at the main crossroads in front of Shibuya Station. No captions; the minimal text is in Japanese and English.
- Meguriau iro to katachi (めぐりあう色とかたち) / Composition. Tokyo: Heibonsha, 2008. ISBN 978-4-582-27769-2. Compositions of colors. The minimal text is in Japanese only.
- Tajū rokō (多重露光) / Multi Exposure. Exhibition catalogue.
- Katsura rikyū (桂離宮). 2010. ISBN 4-89737-655-6.
- Nakamori, Yasufumi. Katsura: Picturing Modernism in Japanese Architecture. Museum of Fine Arts Houston, 2010. ISBN 0-300-16333-9.
- Moriyama Akiko (森山明子). Ishimoto Yasuhiro: Shashin to iu shikō (石元泰博 写真という思考) / Yasuhiro Ishimoto: Beyond the Eye that Shapes. 武蔵野美術大学出版局, 2010. ISBN 4901631950。

=== Other publications including Ishimoto's work ===
- Szarkowski, John, and Shoji Yamagishi. New Japanese Photography. New York: Museum of Modern Art, 1974. ISBN 0-87070-503-2 (hard), ISBN 0-87070-503-2 (paper) Four photographs (1953–1954) from Katsura (1960).
- Nihon nūdo meisakushū (日本ヌード名作集, Japanese nudes). Camera Mainichi bessatsu. Tokyo: Mainichi Shinbunsha, 1982. Pp. 166–69 show nudes by Ishimoto.
- Nihon shashin no tenkan: 1960 nendai no hyōgen (日本写真の転換：1960時代の表現) / Innovation in Japanese Photography in the 1960s. Tokyo: Tokyo Metropolitan Museum of Photography, 1991. Exhibition catalogue, text in Japanese and English. Pp. 68–77 show examples from "Chicago, Chicago".
- Densha ni miru toshi fūkei 1981–2006 (電車にみる都市風景 1981–2006 / Scenes of Tokyo City: Prospects from the Train 1981–2006. Tama City, Tokyo: Tama City Cultural Foundation Parthenon Tama, 2006. Exhibition catalogue; pp. 4–13 are devoted to Ishimoto. Captions and text in Japanese and English.

== General references ==
- Auer, Michèle, and Michel Auer. Encyclopédie internationale des photographes de 1839 à nos jours/Photographers Encyclopaedia International 1839 to the Present. Hermance: Editions Camera Obscura, 1985.
- Yasuhiro Ishimoto, photographs, Canadian Centre for Architecture
- Colorado Department of Personnel & Administration. WWII Japanese Internment Camp; 'The Granada Relocation Center Site'. Accessed 31 March 2006
- George Eastman House. George Eastman House Database, s.v. "Ishimoto, Yasuhiro". Accessed 31 March 2006
- I Photo Central. 'E-Photo Newsletter, Issue 84, 1/17/2005'. Accessed, cited 31 March 2006
- Ishimoto, Yasuhiro. 'Postscript'. In Katsura Villa: Space and Form (New York: Rizzoli, 1987), 265, 266.
- Isozaki, Arata, Osamu Sato and Yasuhiro Ishimoto. Katsura Villa: Space and Form (New York: Rizzoli, 1987).
- Longmire, Stephen. "Callahan's Children: Recent Retrospectives of Photographers from the Institute of Design". Afterimage, vol. 28, no. 2 (September/October 2000), 6.
- Photo Gallery International. 'Gallery; Gallery Artists; Yasuhiro Ishimoto'. Accessed 29 October 2003
- Stephen Daiter Gallery. Yasuhiro Ishimoto Photographs. Accessed 26 May 2008.
- Tucker, Anne Wilkes, et al. The History of Japanese Photography. New Haven: Yale University Press, 2003. ISBN 0-300-09925-8
- Union List of Artist Names, s.v. "Ishimoto, Yasuhiro". Accessed 31 March 2006
- Yannopoulos, Charles. 'Uncommon Vision', Clevescene.com (originally published by Cleveland Scene, 2000-11-16). Accessed 31 March 2006
