= Reminiscence (Kansuke Yamamoto) =

1953 photograph by Kansuke Yamamoto

Reminiscence (追憶, Tsuioku) is a 1953 photograph by Japanese photographer and poet Kansuke Yamamoto. The image sets a distorted, empty birdcage against a Japanese cityscape. The birdcage was a recurring motif in Yamamoto's photography and poetry and appears in works from both before and after World War II.

The photograph has been read in relation to war, devastation and the aftermath of the atomic bomb, although commentators have differed over how specifically those associations should be understood. Reminiscence was included in the J. Paul Getty Museum exhibition Japan's Modern Divide: The Photographs of Hiroshi Hamaya and Kansuke Yamamoto in 2013 and was chosen for the front cover of the accompanying catalogue.

== Composition and technique ==
The Getty Museum identifies Reminiscence as a gelatin silver print. The print reproduced as plate 70 in the catalogue for Japan's Modern Divide measures 31.1 cm × 25.4 cm (12.2 in × 10.0 in).

Sources describe the construction of the image in different terms. Eiko Aoki calls Reminiscence a collage, Taka Ishii Gallery describes it as a photomontage, and amanasalto identifies it as a multiple exposure work.

Across the image, the bars of a birdcage are twisted and superimposed over an urban landscape. No bird is visible inside the cage.

== Interpretation ==
Writing about the Getty exhibition in Trans Asia Photography, Eiko Aoki describes the cage as superimposed over a city and reads the photograph as evoking a memory of devastation or the atomic bombing. She suggests that the work may also reflect Yamamoto's experience of wartime Japan, when the country's political and social climate had become increasingly oppressive. Aoki nevertheless stresses that the cage remains open to more than one interpretation.

Taka Ishii Gallery gives the atomic-bomb association greater weight, arguing that the twisted cage bars laid over the Japanese city unmistakably recall the memory of the atomic bomb.

The question was discussed in more detail in Aoki's 2014 interview with Judith Keller and Amanda Maddox, the curators of Japan's Modern Divide. Aoki introduced the work as an image of a birdcage and a devastated city that suggests an atomic-bomb landscape. Keller noted that Yamamoto returned to the cage motif repeatedly but said that it was not clear whether he himself meant the cage in Reminiscence to represent the atomic bomb.

Maddox agreed that the image could be read in terms of the atomic bomb, while pointing out that Yamamoto used the cage elsewhere as a symbol of imprisonment or censorship. She also noted that the city in the photograph has not been identified. Because many of Yamamoto's city scenes were photographed in Nagoya, she suggested that the city may be Nagoya and that the work could instead, or at the same time, express a feeling of being trapped there.

Sotheby's places the work in a similar postwar context but develops the symbolism of the cage in another direction. Its catalogue note describes the rusty, mangled cage as overlaid on a Japanese city in a way that evokes the devastating aftermath of the atomic bomb. It also draws a parallel between the cage and the houses below it, reading both as forms of enclosure and suggesting the entrapment of the unseen inhabitants of the city. The same note relates the work to Yamamoto's criticism of restrictions on free expression and to the political conditions of postwar Japan, including the U.S. occupation.

Sotheby's also finds a more hopeful possibility in the image. Its catalogue note states that Yamamoto associated birds with freedom because of their ability to fly and reads the absence of a bird from the cage as suggesting that neither the bird nor, symbolically, Japan and its people remain trapped inside it.

== Birdcage motif ==
The birdcage recurs in Yamamoto's photography and poetry and is one of the motifs most closely associated with his treatment of confinement and free expression. Amanda Maddox discusses the motif at length in her essay for Japan's Modern Divide, connecting it with Yamamoto's response to state restrictions on expression in wartime Japan.

In 1940 Yamamoto made at least two photographs titled Buddhist Temple's Birdcage, in which an old-fashioned telephone is placed in relation to a birdcage. He published the poem "Legend of a Buddhist Temple" in the magazine Kōkaku in the same year. Maddox relates the cage and temple imagery in these works to political control and restrictions on free expression, reading the cage as an image of the "prison" of Japanese society under the Peace Preservation Law. In one of the photographs, the telephone receiver appears outside the cage, which she interprets as suggesting the possibility of freedom.

Art historian Jelena Stojković likewise treats the two Buddhist Temple's Birdcage photographs as a sequence that was published together with the poem. She relates the works to the silencing of critical thought while also placing them within contemporary debates around the Surrealist use of photography and the Surrealist object.

Taka Ishii Gallery explicitly connects the appearance of the birdcage in the 1940 work with its return in Reminiscence in 1953, while giving the two images different historical readings. In Buddhist Temple's Birdcage, the gallery identifies the telephone with freedom of speech and the cage with Japan's social structure under wartime authority. In Reminiscence, the cage has been transformed into a set of twisted bars spread over the cityscape, which the gallery associates with the memory of the atomic bomb.

== Exhibition and publication history ==
Reminiscence was shown from March 26 to August 25, 2013, in Japan's Modern Divide: The Photographs of Hiroshi Hamaya and Kansuke Yamamoto at the J. Paul Getty Museum at the Getty Center in Los Angeles. The Getty presented the photograph in the section devoted to Yamamoto's experimental postwar work from the late 1940s through the early 1960s, a period in which he worked with color photography, combination printing, photograms, sculpture and photographic narrative sequences.

The photograph was reproduced as plate 70 in the exhibition catalogue, edited by Judith Keller and Amanda Maddox. It was also selected for the front cover, while a photograph by Hiroshi Hamaya appeared on the back. In Aoki's interview with the curators, Keller explained that attempts to combine works by both photographers on the cover had proved unsuccessful and that Reminiscence was ultimately chosen for the front because it worked effectively as a graphic image. The same discussion turned to the work's cage motif and the different meanings it might carry.

In 2016 Reminiscence appeared in a solo exhibition of Yamamoto's work at Taka Ishii Gallery in New York City. The exhibition ran from April 14 to May 14 and combined a selection of Yamamoto's vintage prints with fourteen modern prints of works dating from 1933 to 1953.

The fourteen modern prints were produced by amanasalto's platinum-palladium studio in Japan from Yamamoto's surviving negatives under the supervision of his son Toshio Yamamoto, then representative of the Estate of Kansuke Yamamoto. The group, titled Kansuke Yamamoto – Selection from Early Works (1933–1953), included Reminiscence, Buddhist Temple's Birdcage and A Chronicle of Drifting among its fourteen images. amanasalto states that digital technology was combined with platinum printing to reproduce works whose original printing methods, including complex multiple exposures, were difficult to reconstruct from the surviving negatives.

== Print and provenance ==
The print exhibited by the Getty in 2013 was a gelatin silver print measuring 31.1 cm × 25.4 cm (12.2 in × 10.0 in) from the collection of Anne and David Ruderman. The Getty assigned the exhibition loan number EX.2013.2.93 to the print.

The 1953 print later offered by Sotheby's was identified in the auction catalogue as the same print reproduced as plate 70 in Japan's Modern Divide. Sotheby's described it as possibly ferrotyped and gave the same dimensions of 31.1 cm × 25.4 cm (12.2 in × 10.0 in).

According to the Sotheby's catalogue, the reverse carries Yamamoto's credit, copyright and estate stamps, the date "53", and the annotation "TSG Catalogue #93" written in pencil by Toshio Yamamoto. The print was corner-mounted, and the mount was embossed, stamped and bore the same catalogue annotation in Toshio Yamamoto's hand.

== Auction history ==
On October 3, 2019, the 1953 print of Reminiscence was offered as lot 198 in Sotheby's Classic Photographs sale in New York. The pre-sale estimate was US$20,000–30,000. The print sold for US$50,000, exceeding the high estimate.

According to ArtDaily, the sale marked the first time a work by Yamamoto had been offered at auction and established a new auction record for the artist. Later that year, Sotheby's included Reminiscence in its year-end feature "Sotheby's Most Memorable Photographs Sold in 2019".

== See also ==
- Kansuke Yamamoto (artist)
- Buddhist Temple's Birdcage
- Japan's Modern Divide: The Photographs of Hiroshi Hamaya and Kansuke Yamamoto
- Surrealism in Japan
- Surrealist photography
- Surrealist photography in Japan
- Avant-garde photography in Japan
- Nagoya Photo Avant-Garde
- Photography in Nagoya
- Photography in Japan
