= Surrealism in Japan =

Artistic genre

Surrealism in Japan refers to the reception, translation, and local development of Surrealism in Japan from the late 1920s onward, across poetry, visual art, photography, publishing, and exhibition culture. Reference overviews commonly stress that there was no single cohesive surrealist group in Japan comparable to the Paris circle; instead, Japanese surrealism developed through diffuse circles, regional activity, and individual engagements under distinct historical conditions.

Political conditions were central to that development. Reference and exhibition overviews note that the 1925 Peace Preservation Law and the wider repressive atmosphere of early Shōwa Japan formed an important backdrop for the movement, and that several surrealists were arrested or interrogated in 1940 and 1941.

Recent transnational museum scholarship has further reframed Surrealism as a global field rather than a single Paris-centered narrative. In that context, museum and reference accounts describe the critic-poet Shūzō Takiguchi as an early introducer of Surrealism in Japan through translation, criticism, and exhibition activity, while Surrealism Beyond Borders identifies Nagoya as one of the liveliest centres of Surrealist activity in the country and discusses the poet-photographer Kansuke Yamamoto among the leading figures of its late-1930s milieu.

Because prewar activity was curtailed by censorship, repression, war, and the loss of works and artists, later understanding of Surrealism in Japan has depended heavily on retrospective scholarship, preservation, and museum reconstruction. At the same time, recent exhibition catalogues emphasise that surrealist impulses in Japan did not simply disappear after 1945 but continued across multiple cultural fields in the postwar period.

== Timeline ==
The following timeline summarizes selected developments in the history of Surrealism in Japan. Major exhibitions, periodicals, and regional centres are discussed in more detail below.

Year	Event
1923	The Great Kanto earthquake and subsequent political violence and repression are cited as part of the background for Japan's interwar cultural climate.
1924	Breton's Manifesto of Surrealism and the journal La Revolution surrealiste establish a framework that later Japanese periodicals translated and discussed.
1925 (Nov.)	Nishiwaki Junzaburo returns to Japan; later accounts treat student circles around Nishiwaki as one origin point for Japanese Surrealism.
1925	The Peace Preservation Law (Public Security Preservation Law) is passed; later accounts link this repressive atmosphere to surveillance and later arrests and interrogations of surrealists.
1925	The term chogenjitsushugi (超現実主義) appears in Japanese discourse, with later accounts discussing its coinage and early circulation.
1927–1928	Poets begin introducing French surrealists in Bungei tanbi and launch the poetry journal Shobi, majutsu, gakusetsu, which publishes four issues and includes a short manifesto.
1928–1931	Shi to shiron (Poetry and Poetics) begins in 1928, runs fourteen issues, and publishes translations from French surrealism, including Breton's manifestos in multiple issues.
1929	Nishiwaki publishes Chogenjitsushugi shiron (Criticism of surrealist poetry), treated in later accounts as a landmark in early literary reception.
1929	Surrealist painting begins to appear in Japanese exhibition contexts, including work presented as "surrealism" at the 16th Nika exhibition, while reception develops without a single programmatic center.
1930	A Japanese translation of Breton's Surrealism and Painting is published; Stojkovic notes that it reproduced fifty images, widening access to surrealist painting through illustrated print.
1932–1933	The Paris–Tokyo League of Emerging Artists exhibition tours multiple cities; the regional tour is cited as catalytic for interest beyond Tokyo.
1935	Kitasono establishes the journal VOU; overviews note its wartime interruption and later changes in character.
1936	Yamanaka publishes L'Échange surréaliste in Tokyo; copies were owned by Penrose and Éluard, and the publication was also known to Breton and Hugnet.
1937	Kaigai Chōgenjitsushugi Sakuhin ten (Exhibition of Foreign Surrealist Works) becomes a widely cited turning point; Stojkovic notes its predominantly photographic mode of display and its effects on photographic culture.
1937–1939	Avant-garde photography groups associated with Surrealism are formed in several cities, including the Avangyarudo Zōei Shūdan (Avant-Garde Imaging Group) in Osaka in 1937, the Zen'ei Shashin Kyōkai (Avant-Garde Photography Association) in Tokyo in 1938, Société Irf in Fukuoka in 1939, and the Nagoya Photo Avant-Garde in Nagoya in 1939.
1938	Japanese practitioners and works are reproduced in Breton and Eluard's Dictionnaire abrégé du surréalisme (1938), often cited as a marker of international visibility.
1938–1939	Kansuke Yamamoto publishes the surrealist magazine Yoru no Funsui in Nagoya. Stojkovic states that the magazine was banned by police. Yamamoto was interrogated by police in connection with its publication in 1939.
1939	Overviews note that by 1939 "avant-garde" could itself become unacceptable in group names; photography associations are recorded as undergoing renaming under wartime controls, including shifts toward shashin zokei (写真造形) and shashin bunka (写真文化) labels.
1941	Exhibition catalogues and overviews note arrests and detentions of figures such as Fukuzawa Ichiro and Takiguchi Shuzo in 1941 in connection with suspicion toward Surrealism and Communism.
1941–1947	The Zen'ei Bijutsu-kai (Avant-Garde Art Association), formed in 1941 and associated directly with Surrealism, was suppressed by the military authorities in 1943 and revived in 1947.
1951	Jikken Kōbō (Experimental Workshop) is formed with the involvement of Takiguchi as an interdisciplinary group of artists and musicians.
1954	Camera introduces the international "subjective photography" movement in Japan, as discussed in Stojkovic's account of postwar conditions.
1956	A Surrealism study group of critics and poets is formed with Takiguchi as a mentor; discussions from the group were published in Bijutsu hihyō that year.
1956	Japan Subjective Photography League is established in May, and the First International Subjective Photography Exhibition is held in December as part of the postwar reconfiguration of photographic modernism.
1959–1960	The Paris exhibition EROS (Exposition internationale du surréalisme) receives a significant response in Japan, mediated by Takiguchi and Shibusawa; Mizue publishes a special issue on the exhibition in July 1960.
1968–1970	Chi to bara (Blood and Roses) runs for four issues, with Shibusawa as editor in chief for the first three; it publishes translations of Surrealist writers and features on Surrealist artists alongside material on eroticism, occultism, and Japanese cultural traditions.
1970	Bijutsu techō publishes a special issue on Surrealism in December, with contributions addressing its place in contemporary art and criticism in Japan.

== Terminology and translation ==
Japanese reception used several overlapping labels for Surrealism and often treated translation and print circulation as the primary route by which surrealist texts, concepts, and visual examples became legible in the interwar period.

=== Key Japanese terms and semantic range ===
The standard Japanese term for Surrealism is chōgenjitsushugi (超現実主義). Stojkovic notes that the word was coined by the anarchist poet Muramatsu Masatoshi and first appeared in 1925, alongside early translations of Surrealist poetry that helped establish "Surrealism" as a readable label in Japanese literary culture. Overviews emphasize that the category "Surrealism" in Japan was applied across multiple media, with poetry and criticism providing one influential point of entry and later practices in painting and photography often developing without a single shared critical framework or unified programme.

=== Landmark translations and their effects ===
A key early landmark was the appearance of translated manifesto materials in little magazines: Stojkovic notes that Kitagawa Fuyuhiko's translation of Breton's Manifeste du surréalisme (1924) appeared in 1929 in the magazine Shi to shiron (詩と詩論) (Poetry and Poetics). The International Encyclopedia of Surrealism likewise situates Takiguchi as a central translator-critic who moved toward direct engagement with French Surrealist texts and published a Japanese translation of Breton's Surrealism and Painting in 1930, part of a wider proliferation of short-lived journals that combined translation and original writing in the late 1920s and early 1930s.

Illustrated translation could also function as a vehicle for visual reception. In Stojkovic's account, the June 1930 Japanese translation of Breton's Le Surréalisme et la peinture was accompanied by fifty reproductions from the original illustrated volume, widening access to Surrealist painting through print reproduction beyond earlier magazine notices alone.

=== Adjacent labels and boundary disputes ===
Japanese discussions frequently positioned Surrealism in proximity to other imported and domestic labels (including Dada, modernism, and "avant-garde"), and terminology could shift with medium and context. Stojkovic argues that, by the later 1930s, "avant-garde" could operate as a public-facing proxy in contexts where explicit Surrealist identification was politically risky. The International Encyclopedia of Surrealism similarly notes that "avant-garde" could function "almost as a synonym or even code for surrealism" in the late-1930s photography milieu, before "avant-garde" itself became unacceptable in group titles and was replaced by terms such as zōkei (造形) ("plasticity"/form-making) and bunka (文化) ("culture") in organisational names.

=== Mini-glossary ===
- chōgenjitsushugi (超現実主義): Surrealism; coined and first recorded in 1925 in later accounts.
- avangyarudo (アヴァンギャルド) / zen'ei (前衛): "avant-garde"; sometimes used as a proxy label in the late 1930s under political constraint.
- zōkei (造形): "plasticity"/form-making; used in some wartime-era renamings of photography groups (e.g., Shashin Zōkei Kenkyūkai).
- bunka (文化): "culture"; used in some wartime-era renamings of photography groups (e.g., Nagoya Shashin Bunka Kyōkai).

== Historical context ==
=== Post-1923 social climate and cultural politics ===
Some overviews locate the Japanese reception of Surrealism within a distinct interwar climate shaped by the aftermath of the Great Kanto earthquake (1923) and the political violence and repression that followed, contrasting this context with the post-World War I crisis that is often invoked for the Paris movement. In this account, the earthquake aftermath and subsequent crackdowns contributed to a repressive atmosphere in which avant-garde activity could attract suspicion even when it was not the immediate object of state policy.

=== Peace Preservation Law and Tokko as structural constraints ===
Overviews describe the 1925 Peace Preservation Law (referred to in some English-language accounts as the "Public Security Preservation Law") as a key legal framework for the policing of political thought and association in interwar Japan. Stojkovic argues that the dispersed, multi-centred character of Surrealist activity in Japan should be understood in relation to this changing political climate: the Peace Preservation Law proclaimed organised opposition to national policy illegal, and enforcement was carried out by the Special Higher Police (Tokubetsu kōtō keisatsu (特別高等警察)), which systematically suppressed the Communist Party as well as anarchist and proletarian art groups. In such a climate, surveillance could extend to Surrealist practices, and official discourse could treat Surrealism as politically suspect (including through association with Communism).

=== Internationalism under suspicion ===
Scholarship also notes that international cultural exchange could be politically sensitive in interwar Japan, particularly when avant-garde circles were perceived (accurately or not) as aligned with leftist politics. Munro emphasises that French–Japanese contact operated through correspondence and the circulation of publications and documentation, a form of exchange that could require careful navigation under domestic scrutiny.

=== Media ecology: magazines, exhibitions, associations ===
Rather than consolidating around a single institution, Surrealist reception and debate in Japan circulated through overlapping infrastructures such as translation, little magazines, exhibition-related print, and the semi-formal organisational forms typical of interwar art and photography culture. The exhibition catalogue Surrealism and Japan (『シュルレアリスム宣言』100年 シュルレアリスムと日本) similarly frames the spread of Surrealism in the 1930s as accelerated by art-school students forming avant-garde groups and exhibiting in local galleries, and it notes that group activities occurred not only in Tokyo but also in cities such as Kyoto, Nagoya, and Fukuoka.

== Early reception in the 1920s ==
=== Nishiwaki circle and study networks ===
Overviews often locate an early point of entry for literary Surrealism in the work and teaching of poet Junzaburo Nishiwaki, who studied at Oxford (1923–1925) and returned to Japan in late 1925. The International Encyclopedia of Surrealism describes Nishiwaki as a conduit who treated surrealism as part of literary modernism and organised an extra-curricular surrealist study group after becoming a professor at Keio University; this environment helped shape later figures including Shuzo Takiguchi.

The same overview stresses that early Japanese engagements were not unified in aim: Nishiwaki and Katue Kitasono are both presented as approaching surrealism primarily as poetics, but with different emphases, and Kitasono is noted as not actually joining Nishiwaki's study group (first meeting Nishiwaki only in 1929). The exhibition catalogue Surrealism and Japan (『シュルレアリスム宣言』100年 シュルレアリスムと日本) likewise frames Nishiwaki's circle as one origin point for Japanese Surrealism, and it situates Takiguchi as a leading translator-critic within the subsequent reception history.

=== Early periodicals as transmission channels ===
Accounts of early reception emphasise that little magazines and poetry journals provided practical infrastructure for translation, discussion, and the articulation of positions before any stable institutional base existed. The International Encyclopedia of Surrealism describes how Kitasono established his own small "faction" (with Toshio and Tamotsu Ueda) and founded the journal Shobi, majutsu, gakusetsu (薔薇・魔術・学説), which ran for four issues (1927–1928) and included a short manifesto setting out aims. The Surrealism and Japan catalogue similarly notes that poets associated with Bungei tanbi introduced French surrealist work and then launched Shobi, majutsu, gakusetsu, characterising it as publishing a text that could be regarded as an early manifesto issued by Japanese poets, and describing later consolidation with Nishiwaki's circle.

Takiguchi is described in these overviews as moving toward direct engagement with French surrealist texts, with periodicals serving as a key venue for translation and original writing in the late 1920s and early 1930s. The International Encyclopedia of Surrealism singles out Shi to shiron (詩と詩論) (Poetry and Poetics) as a comparatively sustained platform (fourteen issues, 1928–1931) that published both Japanese texts and translations from French surrealism, including Breton manifesto materials across multiple issues.

=== Breton, automatism, and early framing in print ===
In early Japanese introductions, translated excerpts and summaries of surrealist ideas often functioned as "concept objects" in print: readers encountered surrealism through discussions of its methods (including automatic writing/automatism) and through the circulation of translated texts in magazines rather than through a single consolidated group programme. Stojkovic notes, for example, that manifesto materials entered Japanese poetic culture via small magazines, including a 1929 publication of a translation of Breton's Manifeste du surréalisme in Shi to shiron.

Munro notes that Freudian ideas were in circulation in Japan from at least 1926 and enjoyed some popularity during the 1930s. She also observes that Japanese artists, psychoanalysts, and commentators sometimes related Freudian theory to indigenous ethical and religious systems.

The Surrealism and Japan exhibition catalogue similarly frames the late-1920s print environment as an important precondition for the 1930s expansion: it positions surrealism as first becoming widely legible through poetry-oriented reception and translation activity, before later developments unfolded in other media.

=== Early debates over "movement" vs "individual practice" ===
Later historiography frequently treats this period as setting a pattern in which "surrealism" in Japan was pursued through distinctive individual or circle-based interpretations rather than through a single collective consciousness. The International Encyclopedia of Surrealism characterises the prewar history as "more a history of individual penchants than one of a cohesive 'movement'". Munro likewise records internal reflection on the absence of a unified national centre: she cites a 1971 statement by Takiguchi that "there is not a proper group or collective Surrealist activity in Japan", and she frames the prewar field as motivated by multiple groups in metropolitan areas with differing interpretations.

== Networks with Paris ==
Scholarship on transnational surrealism emphasizes that the exchange between Japanese and French surrealists was not simply a one-way importation of ideas, but developed through correspondence, the circulation of publications, and the practical logistics of exhibition-making. In Munro's account, the most sustained prewar channel was built through the Nagoya-based poet and editor Chirū Yamanaka (also known as Tiroux Yamanaka) and the poet-critic Shuzo Takiguchi, who mediated contact with figures including Paul Éluard and André Breton.

=== Yamanaka / Takiguchi correspondence network ===
Munro describes correspondence as a working infrastructure for surrealist exchange in the 1930s: Japanese publications and information were sent to Éluard and Breton via Yamanaka, who remained in contact with Takiguchi, while French surrealists also responded with materials and specific requests. In one example cited by Munro, Éluard suggested that Breton send a Man Ray photograph for reproduction in Japan, and Breton complied, illustrating how the correspondence network operated as a conduit for concrete, reproducible visual material as well as texts.

Harada dates Takiguchi's correspondence with Breton to around 1930 and Yamanaka's correspondence with Éluard to 1933. Harada describes this correspondence as giving rise to a series of joint projects, including the publication of Yamanaka's L'Échange surréaliste in 1936 and the 1937 Surrealist exhibition held in several Japanese cities. Munro notes that copies of L'Échange surréaliste were owned by Penrose and Éluard and that the publication was also known to Breton and Hugnet, both of whom wrote to Yamanaka asking when it would appear.

=== International visibility in the 1930s ===
In 1935, Benjamin Péret cited Japan among the countries in which Surrealism was already present while arguing that the movement needed to take on an international character.

A further marker of Japanese visibility within the international surrealist orbit came in 1938, when Japanese names and reproductions appeared in Breton and Éluard's Dictionnaire abrégé du surréalisme. Munro notes that the Dictionnaire included four reproductions of Japanese works and that Takiguchi provided a list of Japanese practitioners, largely centered on his close associates.

=== Exhibitions organised by mail ===
Munro characterizes the 1937 exhibition project as dependent on international relationships fostered through the correspondence network, noting the importance of Yamanaka's friendship with Éluard and describing Éluard, Georges Hugnet, and Roland Penrose as key figures credited in the 1937 exhibition-linked publication context for assisting the Japanese organisers. She further describes Yamanaka as bearing primary responsibility for soliciting works and handling logistics, including receiving bulk shipments of works and books from Penrose and Hugnet; Hugnet later wrote requesting additional copies of the 1937 exhibition catalogue and provided addresses for further distribution of Japanese surrealist publications, extending Yamanaka's role as a distributor as well as a receiver of materials.

=== Archival survival and later research ===
Munro also stresses that the documentary basis for reconstructing these exchanges is uneven: she identifies Yamanaka's prewar correspondence as the best preserved among Japanese surrealists and notes that, while many prewar letters (including those connected to Takiguchi and Taro Okamoto) were destroyed in wartime bombing, institutional archives preserved substantial correspondence received by Yamanaka (including from Hugnet and Éluard), later supplemented by facsimile reproduction in Yamanaka-related publications.

== Exhibitions and institutions ==
Exhibitions and exhibition-linked print culture functioned as major vehicles for making Surrealism visible in Japan, especially in contexts where activity tended to disperse across circles and cities rather than consolidate around a single organisational centre.

=== Pre-1937 exhibition circuits (including 1932) ===
A prewar exhibition frequently cited for stimulating interest beyond Tokyo was the 1932–1933 "Paris–Tokyo League of Emerging Art" exhibition (sometimes discussed under the Japanese title Pari shinkō bijutsu ten), which toured multiple cities including Tokyo, Osaka, Kyoto, Fukuoka, Kanazawa, and Nagoya. Munro argues that the breadth of this regional circuit helps explain why surrealist imagery and debate developed in multiple local settings rather than remaining concentrated in Tokyo alone. The exhibition catalogue Surrealism and Japan likewise treats early-1930s touring exhibitions as part of the infrastructure that widened audiences for Surrealist art in Japan.

=== Kaigai Chōgenjitsushugi Sakuhin ten (1937) ===
A widely cited turning point for public visibility was the 1937 Kaigai Chōgenjitsushugi Sakuhin ten (Exhibition of Foreign Surrealist Works). Stojkovic notes that the exhibition relied heavily on photographic reproduction rather than original works, with "just over 300 photographs" comprising more than three-quarters of the exhibits; in her account, this predominantly photographic mode of display produced notable reverberations in photographic culture and contributed to the spread of "avant-garde" labels among amateur photo clubs across multiple cities.

Ishii places the exhibition within the wider sequence of international Surrealist exhibitions of the mid-1930s. She notes that its French title, Exposition internationale du surréalisme, followed the naming used for other international Surrealist exhibitions and situates the Japanese exhibition between the 1936 exhibition in London and the 1938 exhibition in Paris. The poster for the Tokyo exhibition was subsequently displayed at the 1938 Paris exhibition alongside material from other major Surrealist exhibitions. Ishii argues that, in this context, the 1937 exhibition can be understood not only as an introduction of European Surrealism to Japanese audiences but also as an active response within Surrealism's international exhibition culture.

=== Exhibition catalogues and print apparatus ===
Accounts of Japanese Surrealism also stress that exhibition-related publications and special issues helped extend the reach of exhibitions beyond their venues. Stojkovic notes that readers were directed to special issues of art magazines such as Mizue (1937) and Atorie (1937) as sources for viewing and reading about Surrealist work in connection with the 1937 exhibition moment, illustrating how exhibition culture and periodical culture reinforced one another.

=== Major exhibitions in Japan (selected) ===
Year	Exhibition	Cities / venues (selected)	Notes
1932–1933	Pari Tōkyō Shinkō Bijutsu Renmei-ten (巴里東京新興美術連盟展; Paris–Tokyo League of Emerging Art / "Confederation of Avant-Garde Artists")	Tokyo; Osaka; Kyoto; Fukuoka; Kanazawa; Nagoya	Touring exhibition cited as catalytic for interest beyond Tokyo and for regional diffusion.
1937	Kaigai Chōgenjitsushugi Sakuhin-ten (海外超現実主義作品展; Exhibition of Foreign Surrealist Works)	Tokyo; Kyoto; Osaka; Nagoya	Predominantly photographic display; "just over 300 photographs" comprised more than three-quarters of the exhibits in Stojkovic's account.
1990	Nihon no Shururearisumu: 1925–1945 (日本のシュールレアリスム : 1925～1945; Surrealism in Japan, 1925–1945)	Nagoya City Art Museum	Survey exhibition frequently cited as a foundational reconstruction across media in later scholarship.
2023–2024	"Shururearisumu Sengen" 100-nen: Shururearisumu to Nihon (『シュルレアリスム宣言』100年 シュルレアリスムと日本; 100 Years of the "Surrealist Manifesto": Surrealism and Japan)	Itabashi Art Museum; (touring venues incl. Museum of Kyoto and Mie Prefectural Art Museum)	Touring exhibition marking the 100th anniversary of Breton's 1924 manifesto; venues and touring structure are described in museum and event listings.

=== Institutions and later reconstructions ===
Later museum exhibitions and catalogues have played a major role in reconstructing prewar Surrealism in Japan, particularly where wartime disruption, uneven survival of works, and fragmentary periodical archives complicate historical reconstruction.

== Literature and poetry ==
Accounts of Japanese surrealism commonly emphasize that poetry and criticism were early entry points, and that translation and small-scale publishing provided the practical infrastructure through which surrealist concepts, texts, and poetics circulated in the late 1920s and early 1930s.

=== Automatism, the surrealist image, and poetic modernism ===
In museum and scholarly overviews, early Japanese engagement with surrealism is frequently framed through poetry, where concepts such as automatism and the surrealist image were discussed as methods for rethinking language, imagination, and the production of imagery. The International Encyclopedia of Surrealism similarly treats Japanese surrealism as developing through divergent literary approaches rather than a single programme, with figures such as Junzaburō Nishiwaki and Katue Kitasono often presented as approaching surrealism primarily as poetics, albeit with different emphases and circles of activity.

=== Translators and poet-critics ===
Overviews frequently position Shūzō Takiguchi as a central poet-critic whose translations and criticism helped stabilize surrealism as a readable category in Japanese literary culture and connected literary discussion to broader avant-garde debates. Stojkovic likewise treats translation in little magazines as a key mechanism by which surrealist manifesto materials and related concepts entered Japanese poetic discourse in the late 1920s, contributing to reception before any durable institutional base existed.

=== Periodicals as publishing infrastructure ===
Rather than functioning only as repositories of texts, periodicals operated as engines of reception by combining translation, original writing, manifesto-like statements, and short critical notices, and by enabling circulation across cities and circles. The exhibition catalogue Surrealism and Japan (『シュルレアリスム宣言』100年 シュルレアリスムと日本) highlights poetry journals and little magazines as early transmission channels, including venues that introduced French surrealist work and published Japanese manifesto-style statements in the late 1920s.

Later accounts also stress that publishing networks could serve as bridges across media. For example, scholarship on Nagoya highlights surrealist-oriented magazines that combined poetry and visual material, including Yoru no Funsui, which is discussed in relation to Kansuke Yamamoto and late-1930s intermedia circles.

=== Periodicals and publishing networks (selected) ===
Title (romanization / English)	Japanese title	City	Years (approx.)	Function in Surrealism reception	Sources
Bungei tanbi (Literary Aesthetic)	文芸耽美	Tokyo	1920s	Introduced French surrealist work in poetry contexts (catalogue framing).	
Shobi, majutsu, gakusetsu (Roses, Magic, Doctrine)	薔薇・魔術・学説	Tokyo	1927–1928	Short-lived poetry journal associated with early manifesto-style positioning (catalogue framing); part of late-1920s little-magazine infrastructure.	
Shi to shiron (later Bungaku) (Poetry and Poetics; later Literature)	詩と詩論 (later 文学)	Tokyo	1928–1931	Published translations and discussion of surrealism-related texts in a comparatively sustained run (overview framing).	
VOU	VOU	Tokyo	from 1935 (wartime interruption noted)	Poetry and avant-garde journal associated with Kitasono; later accounts treat it as a durable publishing platform within Japan's surrealism-adjacent literary milieu.	
L'Échange surréaliste	L'Échange surréaliste	Tokyo	1936	Publication edited by Yamanaka and issued by Bon Shoten in Tokyo in 1936; Munro notes that copies were owned by Penrose and Éluard and that the publication was also known to Breton and Hugnet.	
Mizue	みづゑ	Tokyo	1937	Exhibition-linked print apparatus that helped extend access to surrealist imagery and commentary beyond venues (Stojkovic).	
Ciné	Ciné	Nagoya	1929–1930	Discussed in Francophone scholarship as an early site of reception and translation activity around Tiroux Yamanaka.	
Yoru no Funsui (The Night's Fountain)	夜の噴水	Nagoya	1938–1939	Surrealist-oriented magazine associated with late-1930s Nagoya networks; linked in the Surrealism and Japan exhibition catalogue to Yamamoto and intermedia activity.	
Carnet Bleu	Carnet Bleu	Nagoya	1941–1942	Bulletin issued by Seidōsha; associated with wartime Nagoya publishing networks.	

=== War-era constraints on literary production ===
By the late 1930s and early 1940s, censorship, surveillance, and material shortages increasingly constrained publication and contributed to the interruption, dispersal, or strategic reframing of avant-garde activity in print.

== Visual arts ==
In overviews of Japanese Surrealism, the visual arts are often described as developing through exhibition culture and illustrated print rather than through a single, stable "surrealist school" of painting. Stojkovic notes that Surrealist painting was discussed in Japan soon after it began to be shown in France, but early responses could be ambivalent: a 1928 article by the critic Tari Moriguchi drew on exhibition catalogues and journals such as Cahiers d'art and described "something characteristic of surrealism" in the new painting, while also reporting anti-surrealist sentiment that framed it as "regressive".

=== Painting and illustrated reception (late 1920s–early 1930s) ===
Stojkovic links early painterly reception to a combination of first-hand encounters and mediated reproduction. She notes that Moriguchi travelled to Paris in May 1929 to view Surrealist works at the Galerie Pierre, and that Fukuzawa Ichiro followed soon after, suggesting that some Japanese painters sought direct exposure even as most audiences encountered Surrealism through magazines and catalogues. By 1929, artists including Koga Harue, Abe Kongō, and Togo Seiji exhibited works framed in contemporary commentary as "surrealism" in the 16th 二科展 (Nika exhibition), which Stojkovic notes received mixed reviews in the January 1930 issue of 『アトリエ』 (Atorie), described as the first Japanese magazine issue dedicated to Surrealist visual art.

Illustrated translation further shaped visual reception. Stojkovic emphasizes that the Japanese translation of Breton's Le Surréalisme et la peinture (published in June 1930) reproduced fifty images from the original volume, widening access to Surrealist painting through print beyond scattered magazine notices.

=== Art associations and exhibition platforms ===
Rather than consolidating around a single surrealist organization in the visual arts, Stojkovic argues that the interwar Japanese art field operated through multiple institutions and independent associations with their own exhibition calendars and hierarchies, creating a setting in which Surrealist motifs and procedures could circulate without a single shared critical program or unified group identity.

The 2023 exhibition catalogue similarly frames the spread of Surrealist visual art in Japan as accelerated by art-school students forming avant-garde groups and presenting work in local galleries, noting that activity developed not only in Tokyo but also across other cities including Kyoto, Nagoya, and Fukuoka.

=== Collage, decalcomania, and Surrealist techniques ===
Later reconstructions often treat technique as one practical way Surrealism moved across circles. The exhibition catalogue's chronology notes that in 1931 Fukuzawa exhibited a group of works described as influenced by Max Ernst's collage at the first 独立展 (Independent exhibition), indicating an early, concrete route by which collage aesthetics entered Japanese painting through returnees and exhibition display.

The same catalogue devotes thematic sections to Surrealist methods that circulated internationally and were then introduced into Japanese practice. In its section on decalcomania, it defines the technique (pressing paint under paper or similar material to generate semi-automatic imagery), traces its first published discussion to an article in Minotaure no. 8 (June 1936), and notes that the technique was subsequently introduced and practiced in Japan.

== Photography and the "avant-garde" problem ==
In Japanese photographic culture of the 1930s, Surrealism circulated less as a stable group identity than as a set of procedures and discursive cues that travelled through camera-club networks, photo magazines, and exhibition-linked print. In this context, the label "avant-garde" (zen'ei (前衛) / avangyarudo (アヴァンギャルド)) often functioned as a workable public-facing substitute for "surrealism" in photography, creating what later overviews describe as an "avant-garde" naming problem: the terminology could broaden participation while also obscuring the specific Surrealist genealogy of the practices being pursued. In museum narratives of interwar Japanese modernist photography, shinkō shashin ("New Photography") is described as influenced in part by Surrealism, and photography as art is said to have drawn closer to Surrealism (and abstract art) in later-1930s contexts where it came to be called "avant-garde photography".

=== Naming strategies and wartime renamings ===
The International Encyclopedia of Surrealism notes that numerous photography groups appeared in the wake of the 1937 Kaigai Chōgenjitsushugi Sakuhin ten, and suggests that "avant-garde" was used "almost as a synonym or even code for surrealism" in this milieu. It further records that by 1939 the term "avant-garde" itself became unacceptable to the authorities, with groups adopting substitute labels such as zōkei (造形) ("plasticity"/form-making) and bunka (文化) ("culture") in their organisational names. A Nagoya City Art Museum catalogue similarly describes wartime-era shifts in naming and institutional framing, including changes away from "avant-garde" terminology under tightening cultural controls.

Stojkovic situates these naming strategies within the broader pressures of interwar Japan, arguing that surveillance and the political risks associated with collectivism shaped how avant-garde circles organised and presented themselves publicly, contributing to dispersion and strategic framing rather than a single consolidated "surrealist" photographic group.

=== Camera clubs, magazines, and a shared technical repertoire ===
Rather than treating Surrealist photography as a single school, Stojkovic describes a field of shared operations that moved across artists and photographers in different collectives. In her account, practices such as overlaying, staging, and re-photographing produced a "constellation" of images that resembled collage in structure and effect, abandoning stable centrality while remaining legible within photographic and exhibition circuits. This emphasis on photo-collage helped connect photographic work to adjacent avant-garde practices (including montage and object-oriented experimentation) without requiring a unified organisational centre for "surrealism".

The permeability between "art" and "photography" was also negotiated through institutional categories. Stojkovic notes that art associations and their exhibitions could provide a framework in which photography was admitted as an artistic practice under ambiguous avant-garde headings, including the appearance of "photo plasticity" categories in association exhibition contexts in the later 1930s. Such classifications mattered for what could be submitted, shown, and discussed in public-facing venues, especially as naming constraints tightened toward the end of the decade.

=== The 1937 exhibition as a photographic reception event ===
Accounts of Japanese Surrealism frequently treat the 1937 Kaigai Chōgenjitsushugi Sakuhin ten as a turning point specifically because it made Surrealist work widely visible through reproduction and print-mediated viewing rather than through access to original objects alone. Stojkovic connects this exhibition moment to the subsequent appearance of multiple photography groups adopting "avant-garde" labels, framing the spread of such terminology as part of a photo-magazine and camera-club ecology in which Surrealism could be pursued through displacement effects and montage-like procedures even when explicit "surrealism" naming was politically risky.

=== Case study: Kansuke Yamamoto and the Nagoya network ===
Because Surrealism in Japan rarely consolidated into a single, durable photography organization, later histories often reconstruct Surrealist-inflected photographic practice through regional networks where clubs, magazines, and exhibition circuits can be traced in surviving documentation. Nagoya is frequently used for this purpose, since literary activity, small-scale publishing, and camera-club culture overlapped there in ways that make the "avant-garde" naming problem concrete rather than abstract.

A recent transnational framing appears in Surrealism Beyond Borders, an exhibition and catalogue project of The Metropolitan Museum of Art and Tate Modern, which presents Surrealism as a field shaped by circulation across regions and media rather than a single Paris-centered narrative. In its discussion of interwar Japan, the catalogue describes Nagoya as one of the most active local centers for Surrealist work in the mid-to-late 1930s, emphasizing a milieu in which poetry, translation, painting, and photography were pursued in close proximity rather than in separate, medium-specific institutions.

==== A regional intermedia cluster and an "avant-garde" umbrella (1934–1939) ====
In Surrealism Beyond Borders, Nagoya's Surrealist activity is linked to local publishing and club infrastructures and to the touring impact of the 1937 Kaigai Chōgenjitsushugi Sakuhin ten when it reached Nagoya, after which new collectives formed under the broader (and often safer) umbrella label of the "avant-garde". The catalogue presents the Nagoya Avant-Garde Club (formed at the end of 1937) as explicitly intermedia, bringing together painters, poets, and photographers; it also notes that the club was dismantled in 1939.

Within this framing, the poet-editor Chirū Yamanaka is paired with the photographer-poet Kansuke Yamamoto, as key figures in the city's Surrealist-oriented activity, and the Nagoya case is linked to the broader correspondence-and-publication networks that connected Japanese participants to Paris surrealists through intermediaries such as Shuzo Takiguchi. Stojkovic similarly treats Nagoya as a setting where literary and photographic circles overlapped, and she discusses Yamamoto as a recurring figure in accounts of late-1930s Surrealist photography and publishing.

==== Small magazines as infrastructure: Yoru no Funsui (1938–1939) ====
The small magazine Yoru no Funsui (1938–1939) is described in the 2023 exhibition catalogue Surrealism and Japan as part of Surrealism's publishing infrastructure in late-1930s Nagoya, with a dedicated discussion of Yamamoto and the periodical's role in combining writing, translation, and visual material across media. In this account, the magazine functions as a practical bridge between poetry circles and photographic/visual experiment rather than as a stand-alone "movement" organ, illustrating how Surrealist ideas circulated through small-scale print even when institutional support was limited. A 1990 exhibition catalogue edited by Nagoya City Art Museum further described Yoru no Funsui as the last poetry journal in Japanese Surrealism to explicitly identify itself as purely Surrealist. Stojkovic likewise presents Yamamoto as active across clubs and periodicals in the 1930s and treats Yoru no Funsui as a key node within Nagoya's Surrealist-oriented publishing network.

==== Policing, renaming, and the instability of public labels (1939–1941) ====
The Nagoya network also illustrates why the "avant-garde" label could be both enabling and precarious. Surrealism Beyond Borders notes that Yoru no Funsui was banned by police in 1939 and that the Nagoya Avant-Garde Club was dismantled in the same year, even as a photographic offshoot continued briefly under new organizational forms. In Stojkovic's biographical notes, Yamamoto is recorded as having been interrogated by police in 1939 in relation to publishing Yoru no Funsui, with questioning framed in terms of wartime usefulness.

These pressures intersected with the broader wartime shift in what could be named publicly. The International Encyclopedia of Surrealism notes that "avant-garde" could function as a public-facing proxy for surrealism in late-1930s photography, but that by 1939 even "avant-garde" became unacceptable, prompting groups to adopt substitute terms such as zōkei (造形) ("plasticity"/form-making) and bunka (文化) ("culture") in organizational names. A Nagoya City Art Museum catalogue similarly records renaming pressures on local photography organizations under tightening controls, providing concrete institutional documentation for this shift in the Nagoya context.

Taken together, the Nagoya materials show why case studies matter for writing Surrealism in Japan: they reveal how Surrealist-inflected photography was sustained by clubs and small magazines while remaining vulnerable to surveillance and sudden changes in permissible terminology. For later scholarship and museum reconstruction, Yamamoto and the Nagoya network have therefore become a particularly well-documented case linking intermedia practice, small-magazine infrastructures, and the pressures of wartime censorship and surveillance.

== Regional centres ==
Because Surrealism in Japan rarely consolidated into a single national organisation, later histories often reconstruct its development through local infrastructures: periodicals, translators and critics, touring exhibitions, and camera-club networks that operated differently from city to city. Recent museum syntheses similarly frame Japan within a wider geography of Surrealism, encouraging attention to how practices travelled across regions and media rather than only through a Tokyo-centred narrative.

This section sketches regional centres that recur in English-language scholarship and Japanese museum catalogues. It is not exhaustive, but it helps explain why Japanese Surrealism is typically discussed as a set of parallel local scenes connected by print circulation and exhibition circuits rather than as a single, unified movement.

=== Why regions matter ===
Munro links the diffusion of Surrealism in Japan to touring exhibitions and publication networks, arguing that these channels encouraged local and individual development rather than a single national programme, and that distinctive regional emphases can be observed outside Tokyo. The 2023 exhibition catalogue likewise stresses that group activity unfolded not only in Tokyo but also in cities such as Kyoto, Nagoya, and Fukuoka, and that this provincial spread is central to how the field has been reconstructed after wartime disruption.

=== Tokyo (publishers, translators, exhibition-linked print) ===
Tokyo is often treated as a key hub for the translation and circulation of Surrealist texts and images through little magazines, critics, and exhibition-linked print culture. Overviews frequently place poet-critics such as Shuzo Takiguchi within these infrastructures, while also emphasising that Tokyo's publishing prominence did not produce a single cohesive national surrealist group comparable to the Paris circle.

=== Kyoto and Kansai (Kyoto; Osaka; Kobe) ===
Munro suggests that Kyoto-based surrealist practice could be inflected by local interests such as Buddhist sculpture and temple architecture, reflecting the city's concentration of religious sites and related visual traditions. In the wider Kansai region, Munro describes Surrealist practice in Kobe as dominated by the Kobe Poets Club, characterised as an underground, anti-fascist organisation, a profile that differs from other local circles. Osaka, meanwhile, is repeatedly noted in photography-focused accounts as one of the cities where "avant-garde" labels and camera-club networks became visible in the late 1930s, showing how photographic infrastructures could provide a practical (and sometimes safer) public-facing umbrella for Surrealist-inflected experimentation.

=== Nagoya (intermedia networks and photographic circulation) ===
Main articles: Surrealism in Nagoya, Photography in Nagoya, Kansuke Yamamoto (artist)

Nagoya is frequently highlighted as a major centre where poetry, translation, publishing, and photography overlapped in ways that make the "avant-garde" naming problem concrete rather than abstract. In Surrealism Beyond Borders (The Metropolitan Museum of Art and Tate Modern), Nagoya is described as one of Japan's most active centres for Surrealist work in the mid-to-late 1930s, with activity organised through clubs and small magazines that cut across media rather than through medium-specific institutions. Japanese museum reconstructions likewise foreground Nagoya's local infrastructures and document how wartime pressure destabilised public labels and forced rapid organisational renamings, leaving later scholarship and exhibitions to reconstruct the scene through surviving periodicals and institutional records.

=== Regional clusters (selected) ===
City/region	Typical infrastructure	Notes (summary)	Sources
Tokyo	Publishers; translators; critics; exhibition-linked print	Translation and criticism as key conduits; central to circulation but not a single national anchor.	
Kyoto	Local art networks; association-linked circles	Munro suggests local visual traditions (including Buddhist sculpture/architecture) shaped emphases in Kyoto contexts.	
Osaka / Kobe	Camera clubs and magazines (Osaka); poetry-led organisation (Kobe)	Osaka noted in photo-focused accounts of late-1930s "avant-garde" visibility; Kobe described as an underground, anti-fascist poets' organisation.	
Nagoya	Translation + small magazines + camera-club networks	Intermedia overlap repeatedly foregrounded; later reconstructed through periodicals and museum documentation under wartime renaming pressures.	
Other provincial cities (e.g., Fukuoka)	Local circles; touring-exhibition reception	Catalogues stress activity beyond Tokyo and the role of touring/circulation even where documentation is uneven.	

== Wartime suppression and adaptation ==
Although Surrealism in Japan was never unified under a single national organisation, wartime censorship, surveillance, and political repression shaped the field in systematic ways: they reshaped what could be named publicly, narrowed the range of acceptable publication and exhibition activity, disrupted local networks, and influenced which traces of interwar Surrealism would survive to be reconstructed later.

=== Surveillance and the policing of association ===
Accounts of interwar Surrealism in Japan commonly emphasise that the tightening surveillance regime under the Peace Preservation Law and its enforcement apparatus (including the Special Higher Police) discouraged durable collective organisation and made public "movement" identification politically risky. In Stojkovic's framing, this climate helps explain why Surrealist-inflected practice often circulated through dispersed circles and indirectly legible terminology rather than through a consolidated surrealist group comparable to the Paris model.

=== Bans, interrogation, and the dismantling of local milieus ===
Wartime pressure is also visible in concrete interventions against publishing and club activity. In the Nagoya context discussed in Surrealism Beyond Borders, the police banned the magazine Yoru no Funsui in 1939, and the Nagoya Avant-Garde Club is described as being dismantled in the same year as controls intensified. Stojkovic likewise records that Kansuke Yamamoto was interrogated by police in 1939 in relation to publishing Yoru no Funsui, with questioning framed in terms of wartime usefulness.

=== Renaming and strategic compliance in public-facing culture ===
One recurrent adaptation strategy was renaming: as the acceptable vocabulary of public culture narrowed, groups and categories shifted away from overtly "avant-garde" labels toward more institutionally legible terms such as zōkei (造形) ("plasticity"/form-making) and bunka (文化) ("culture"). In the Nagoya case, Surrealism Beyond Borders notes that the Nagoya Photo Avant-Garde continued briefly under new organisational forms, including a renaming in 1940 that foregrounded "photographic culture", before dissolution in 1941. Japanese museum documentation similarly records wartime-era renaming pressures on photography organisations, providing institutional evidence for these shifts in terminology and public framing.

=== The 1941 crackdown as an emblematic endpoint ===
Museum and scholarly overviews often treat 1941 as an emblematic moment of intensified repression, including arrests and detentions of prominent figures such as Fukuzawa Ichiro and Takiguchi Shuzo. International syntheses likewise situate Japanese surrealism within a broader climate of official suspicion and harassment in 1940–1941, framing these events as part of the conditions that constrained public activity and shaped later historiography.

=== Contraction of print outlets and the shrinking of photographic publics ===
Alongside policing, wartime material conditions also reduced the outlets through which avant-garde photography could circulate. Stojkovic notes that photo magazines such as Photo Times stopped running amid wartime shortages, shrinking the practical arenas in which experimental work could be published, debated, and reproduced. In this sense, "suppression" operated both through direct intervention and through the narrowing of the media ecology that had previously enabled interwar circulation.

== Postwar re-connections and mutations ==
Postwar accounts generally describe Surrealism in Japan less as a single "revival" than as a reconfiguration of earlier procedures, images, and publication habits within new institutional and media conditions. The 2023 exhibition catalogue Surrealism and Japan stresses that many prewar achievements were eclipsed by wartime disruption but that surrealist impulses continued after the war across multiple cultural domains, later becoming visible again through preservation, research, and museum work rather than through a continuous organisational lineage.

Later museum texts have also pointed to postwar resonances of Surrealist technique in Japan. In describing Kusama's 1950s works on paper, the Hirshhorn Museum notes that several employ decalcomania, which it describes as a Surrealist technique. Object labels prepared by the Metropolitan Museum of Art for Surrealism Beyond Borders likewise discuss early gouaches by Yayoi Kusama in relation to Surrealism, noting that she was in contact with the poet-critic Shūzō Takiguchi.

=== Organisations and study groups ===
Overviews that emphasise the absence of a single prewar surrealist group also tend to frame the postwar period as one of scattered continuities and re-connections: activity persisted through individual practices, translation and publishing infrastructures, and exhibition publics rather than through a stable national organisation comparable to the Paris circle. In this framing, "postwar surrealism" is often tracked through shifting labels and organisational formats, with postwar culture providing new venues for experimental practice even as the prewar record had to be reconstructed unevenly from surviving documentation.

The Zen'ei Bijutsu-kai (Avant-Garde Art Association), formed in 1941 and directly associated with Surrealism, was suppressed by the military authorities in 1943 and revived in 1947. Takiguchi was one of the founders of the Nihon Avangyardo Bijutsuka Kurabu (Modern Artists Association of Nippon) in 1947 and continued his correspondence with Breton and other Surrealists. In 1951, Takiguchi was involved in the foundation of Jikken Kōbō (Experimental Workshop), an interdisciplinary group of artists and musicians. A Surrealism study group of critics and poets was formed in 1956 with Takiguchi as a mentor, and discussions from the group were published in Bijutsu hihyō that year.

=== Postwar photography ===
In Nagoya, Kansuke Yamamoto, Keiichiro Goto, Minayoshi Takada, and Yoshifumi Hattori formed the photography group VIVI in 1947, bringing together photographers who had been active in or around the prewar avant-garde milieu.

In photography-focused scholarship, postwar "re-connection" is often discussed through new associations and periodical publics rather than through a renewed surrealist school. Stojkovic notes that the magazine Camera introduced the international "subjective photography" movement in Japan in 1954, and she links this to a broader postwar reconfiguration of photographic modernism in which experimental work could again circulate through exhibitions and print networks. She further notes that the Japan Subjective Photography League was established in 1956 and that an international exhibition was held the same year, illustrating how postwar organisations and exhibition formats provided renewed infrastructure for debates about photographic experimentation and artistic identity.

=== Surrealism in the 1960s ===
The 1959–1960 Paris exhibition EROS (Exposition internationale du surréalisme) received a significant response in Japan. Stojkovic notes that its reception was mediated by Takiguchi and, particularly, Shibusawa, and that Mizue published a special issue on the exhibition in July 1960.

Shibusawa's writing and translation also brought Surrealist interests in eroticism and occultism into contact with younger writers and artists. His magazine Chi to bara (Blood and Roses), published in four issues from 1968 to 1970, included translations of Surrealist writers and features on artists such as Hans Bellmer, alongside material on eroticism, occultism, and Japanese cultural traditions.

In December 1970, Bijutsu techō published a special issue on Surrealism. Stojkovic describes the end of the 1960s as a period in which Surrealist ideas had spread across different areas of postwar art and culture in Japan and could no longer be identified with a single movement or group.

=== Political context ===
Stojkovic places the postwar development of Surrealism in Japan against continued political pressure on leftist thought and radical politics, referring in particular to the 1960 signing and 1970 renewal of the US–Japan Security Treaty. She argues that by the end of the 1960s Surrealist ideas had become widespread in Japanese postwar avant-garde art, while Surrealism itself had become a more diffuse and changeable presence rather than a single identifiable movement.

== Historiography and exhibitions ==
Because much interwar documentation was disrupted by wartime censorship, policing, and material shortages, later understanding of Surrealism in Japan has depended heavily on retrospective scholarship, surviving archives, and museum exhibitions.

=== Early Western accounts ===
Munro notes that Japan received only brief treatment in many earlier Western-language histories of Surrealism despite substantial prewar activity and direct contact with European Surrealists. Later scholarship and exhibitions have given greater attention to these exchanges and to the development of Surrealism in different parts of Japan.

=== Postwar neglect and later reassessment ===
Stojkovic notes that by the 1968 A Century of Photography exhibition, knowledge of Surrealist photography in 1930s Japan had been reduced to isolated examples. She argues more broadly that Surrealist photography in Japan had been under-represented in both histories of Surrealism and histories of Japanese photography. Munro identifies the 1990 Nagoya City Art Museum exhibition Nihon no Shururearisumu: 1925–1945 (日本のシュールレアリスム : 1925～1945) as an important reassessment of Japanese Surrealism across media, while noting that the catalogue was published only in Japanese. Stojkovic likewise describes the 1990 exhibition as a pioneering survey that brought together works and primary sources across the field, including material on photography.

=== Recent exhibitions and transnational approaches ===
Recent Japanese exhibition catalogues have examined both the suppression of prewar Surrealist activity and its continuation in different forms after 1945. International projects have also placed Japan within a broader history of Surrealism beyond Europe. Surrealism Beyond Borders, organised by the Metropolitan Museum of Art and Tate Modern, approached Surrealism through exchanges between regions and media and identified Nagoya as one of the active centres of Surrealism in Japan during the 1930s. In its discussion of Nagoya, the catalogue also discusses Chirū Yamanaka and Kansuke Yamamoto as figures in the city's late-1930s Surrealist milieu.

== See also ==
- Surrealism
- Surrealism Beyond Borders
- Kaigai Chōgenjitsushugi Sakuhinten
- Shūzō Takiguchi
- Chirū Yamanaka
- Kansuke Yamamoto (artist)
- Yoru no Funsui
- Nagoya Avant-Garde Club
- Nagoya Photo Avant-Garde
- Photography in Japan
- Photography in Nagoya
- Avant-garde photography in Japan
- Zen'ei shashin
