= A Chronicle of Drifting =

1949 collage by Kansuke Yamamoto

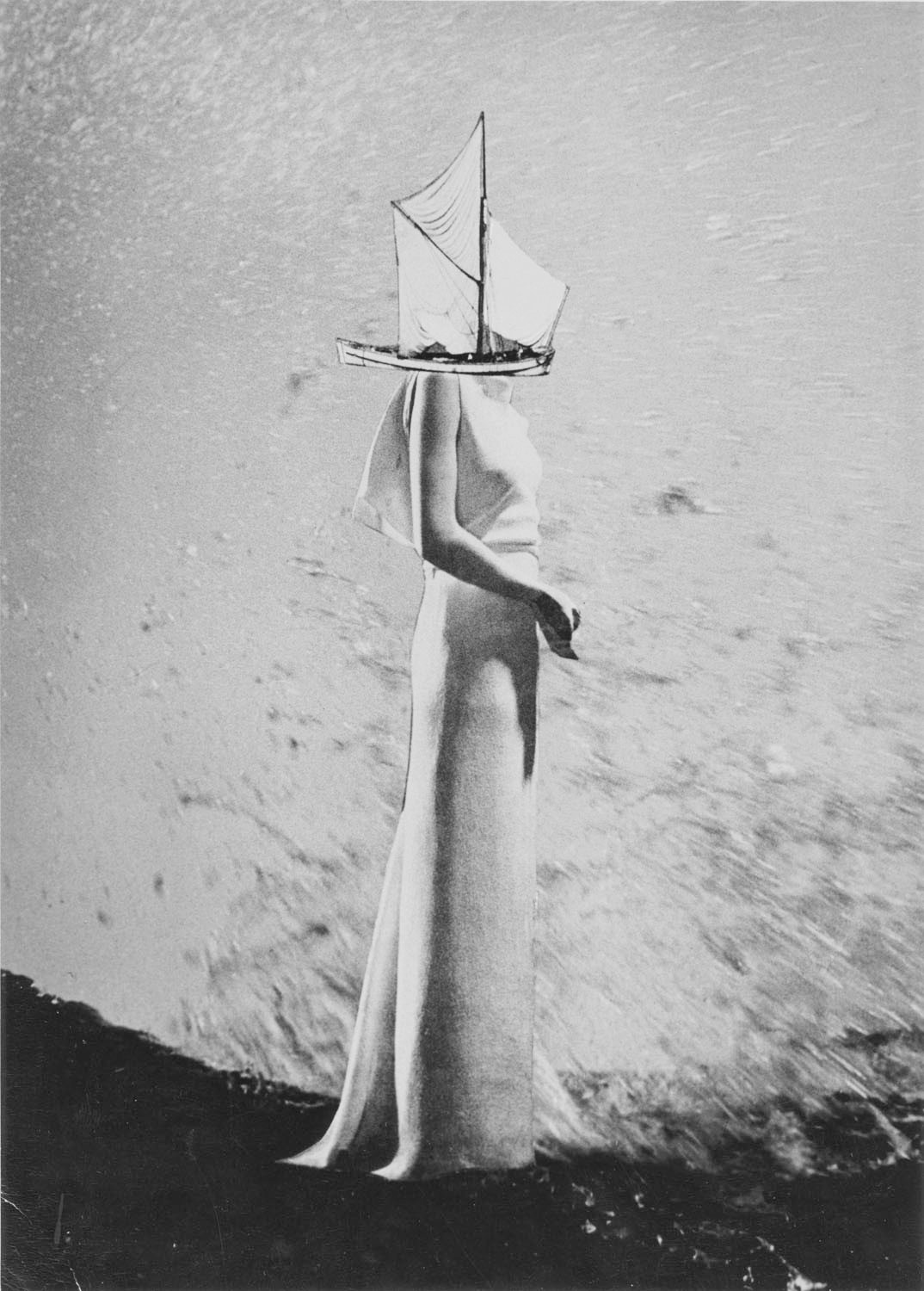
- A Chronicle of Drifting (1949)
- Artist: Kansuke Yamamoto
- Year: 1949
- Type: Collage
- Medium: Gelatin silver print collage
- Dimensions: 30.0 cm × 24.8 cm (11.8 in × 9.8 in)
- Location: J. Paul Getty Museum; Los Angeles

A Chronicle of Drifting (Japanese: 漂流記, Hepburn: Hyōryūki) is a 1949 collage by the Japanese artist Kansuke Yamamoto, now in the collection of the J. Paul Getty Museum. It was first shown in Nagoya in the second VIVI exhibition in August 1949 and was reproduced in Chūkyō Shimbun on 25 January 1950. The work was later featured in the Getty exhibition Japan's Modern Divide and has been described as one of Yamamoto's "highly representative images".

== Description ==
The Getty collection page describes the work as a gelatin silver print collage measuring 30.0 by 24.8 cm. In a review of Japan's Modern Divide, Meher McArthur described the image as an elegant woman in a long gown with a small sailing boat for a head, standing on a watery ground. McArthur interpreted it as a lyrical postwar image of yearning for freedom, made while Japan was recovering from the war.

== Background and exhibition history ==
Yamamoto returned quickly to avant-garde activity after the war. He co-founded the photography group VIVI in 1947 and joined the photographic section of Bijutsu Bunka Kyōkai in 1949. According to the chronology published in Yamamoto Kansuke: Conveyor of the Impossible, A Chronicle of Drifting was included in the second VIVI exhibition at Maruzen Gallery in Nagoya in August 1949, alongside works such as Melancholy Walk, Siegfried Fantasy, and Icarus's Episode. The same chronology records that the work was reproduced in Chūkyō Shimbun on 25 January 1950. Getty's exhibition text presents Yamamoto's postwar production as a continuation of his avant-garde practice in a period when he could once again pursue provocative ideas without the threat of censorship that had prevailed in the 1930s and 1940s.

In 2013, the work was shown in the Getty exhibition Japan's Modern Divide: The Photographs of Hiroshi Hamaya and Kansuke Yamamoto. At that time it was listed as a collage from a private collection entrusted to the Tokyo Metropolitan Museum of Photography. It has since entered the Getty collection.

== Reception ==
The Getty exhibition presented Hiroshi Hamaya and Yamamoto as representing "important but alternate paths in Japanese photography", and it described Yamamoto as an artist who produced innovative, socially conscious photographs, poems, and other works that advanced the avant-garde movement in Japan. A Chronicle of Drifting was one of the Yamamoto works named in the exhibition materials.

In 2016, Taka Ishii Gallery described A Chronicle of Drifting as one of Yamamoto's "highly representative images" in a New York solo exhibition devoted to the artist. Jelena Stojković has argued more broadly that Yamamoto's postwar work is an important point of reference not only for accounts of the Japanese prewar avant-garde but also for the development of contemporary art and photography in Japan. In institutional and gallery presentations, A Chronicle of Drifting has repeatedly been used to represent Yamamoto's postwar return to surrealist and avant-garde invention.

== See also ==
- Reminiscence
- Buddhist Temple's Birdcage
- The Developing Thought of a Human... Mist and Bedroom and
