= Surrealist photography =

Photography associated with Surrealism

- Branch: Photography
- Years active: 1920s–1940s
- Location: Paris and more widely Europe, the Americas, and Japan

Surrealist photography is photography associated with Surrealism. The term usually covers both photographs made by Surrealists and photographs that came to carry Surrealist meanings through their use in Surrealist journals and books. From the 1920s to the 1940s, photographs appeared throughout Surrealist magazines, books, exhibitions, and collaborations, including journals such as La Révolution surréaliste and Minotaure and books such as André Breton's Nadja.

== History ==
Photography did not fit neatly into Surrealism at first. It was commonly tied to visual fact, while Surrealism turned toward dreams, chance, automatism, and the marvelous. That mismatch was part of the attraction. Christian Bouqueret traces some of the background to Dada, especially to photomontage and cameraless processes such as the photogram, and points to Christian Schad's early "Schadographs" and Man Ray's later rayographs as important precedents.

After 1924, photographs began to appear more regularly in Surrealist journals, books, and collaborations. La Révolution surréaliste became the movement's main early journal, and photography there was used not just as illustration but as part of the movement's own visual language.

By the later 1920s and into the 1930s, photography had spread across journals, books, advertising, fashion, and exhibition culture. Bouqueret places side by side figures such as Man Ray, Brassaï, Dora Maar, Claude Cahun, Hans Bellmer, Maurice Tabard, and Raoul Ubac. That list itself gives a sense of how varied Surrealist photography had become by the 1930s.

The Surrealist reception of Eugène Atget points in the same direction. The Metropolitan Museum of Art notes that his photographs were republished in La Révolution surréaliste in 1926 and were valued there as uncanny images of Paris. His case is often cited because it shows that Surrealist photography was shaped not only by new techniques, but also by selection, republication, and reinterpretation.

The Second World War broke up the Paris-centred networks through which Surrealist photography had circulated in the 1930s, but it did not end them. D'Alessandro and Gale stress the continued importance of journals under wartime conditions, and publications such as London Bulletin, La part du sable, Dyn, and VVV show how Surrealist exchange moved through dispersed print networks rather than a single centre.

== Practices ==
Surrealist photographers used montage, solarization, multiple exposure, and cameraless printing. Man Ray's rayographs are one of the best-known examples. Darkroom experiment was only one part of the field. It also included staged photographs, object photographs, and works whose effect depended on pose, performance, or the arrangement of things before the camera.

Surrealist photography also made use of ordinary and found photographs. Museum accounts note the reuse of snapshots, movie stills, anthropological photographs, and medical or police images in Surrealist contexts, where captions, juxtaposition, sequencing, publication, and republication could change how such material was read.

== Transnational developments ==
Surrealist photography did not develop simply as an export from Paris to other parts of the world. Recent scholarship and exhibitions have instead emphasized Surrealism as a network of exchanges shaped by journals, translations, exhibitions, exile, personal contacts, and local political conditions. In this view, regional cases are not best understood as secondary versions of a Parisian model, but as distinct formations within a wider Surrealist field.

=== Europe beyond Paris ===
Within Europe, Surrealist photography developed through several interconnected centres rather than through Paris alone. Ian Walker notes that Édouard Jaguer's Les Mystères de la chambre noire (1982), one of the earlier surveys to broaden the field beyond France and the United States, included work from Romania and Czechoslovakia as well as more familiar centres. The Metropolitan Museum of Art's guide to Surrealism Beyond Borders likewise presents Surrealism as an interrelated network linking Paris with places such as Prague, Bucharest, and Brussels, with journals, catalogues, and other printed matter helping to sustain those connections.

Belgium, Czechoslovakia, and the Netherlands all formed part of this wider European field. The Met guide includes the special Surrealist number of the Brussels journal Variétés (1929) among the publications central to this network, and it presents Jindřich Štyrský's photographs as part of a Czechoslovak search for "surreality" in everyday objects and chance encounters. In the Netherlands, wartime Surrealist activity was connected to little magazines and clandestine collective practice. D'Alessandro and Gale identify the photographer and writer Emiel van Moerkerken as a regular contributor to De Schone Zakdoek, whose collaboration with Chris van Geel brought a distinct taste for visual experimentation to the group.

=== The Americas ===
In the Americas, Surrealist photography developed through exile, migration, publication, and local adaptation rather than as a direct extension of Parisian practice. The Metropolitan Museum of Art's materials for Surrealism Beyond Borders present the movement in this region as spanning North America, the Caribbean, and Latin America, while also stressing that Surrealism's international history has often been narrowed by a Western European focus. As elsewhere, photographic activity was closely tied to circulation: journals, reproductions, and documentary images allowed Surrealist ideas to move across linguistic and national boundaries, while local artistic and political conditions shaped how those ideas were received and transformed.

Mexico City became one of the important nodes in this hemispheric network during the late 1930s and 1940s. The Met's guide to Surrealism Beyond Borders presents Mexico not simply as a refuge for displaced European artists, but as a site in which Surrealism was reworked through new encounters, objects, landscapes, and publication networks, including the journal Dyn. Wartime New York City formed another centre of activity, especially through VVV, which was published between 1942 and 1944 and helped connect Surrealists in exile with broader transatlantic and hemispheric circuits of publication.

=== Japan ===
In Japan, Surrealist photography developed across overlapping avant-garde circles of photographers, poets, critics, painters, and designers rather than through a single national organization. The 1937 Kaigai Chōgenjitsushugi Sakuhin ten (Exhibition of Overseas Surrealist Works) helped stimulate new work in the medium.

Two of the most active regional formations were Osaka and Nagoya. In Nagoya, photography was closely tied to poetry, translation, and small-scale publishing. Kansuke Yamamoto was one of the photographers active in this milieu; he moved across photographic and literary circles, published the Surrealist journal Yoru no Funsui in 1938, and later took part in the Nagoya Photo Avant-Garde.

== See also ==
- Surrealism
- History of photography
- Surrealist photography in Japan
