= Keiichirō Gotō =

Japanese photographer associated with avant-garde photography in Nagoya

- 後藤 敬一郎
- Born: 1918; Nagoya, Japan
- Died: 2004 (aged 85–86)
- Occupation: Photographer
- Known for: Prewar Surrealist-inflected photography in Nagoya; Co-founding VIVI; Participation in subjective photography in Japan
- Movement: Avant-garde photography; Subjective photography

Keiichirō Gotō (後藤敬一郎, Gotō Keiichirō; 1918 – 2004) was a Japanese photographer from Nagoya. Later summaries of his career describe him as a Nagoya-based photographer inclined toward Surrealism who pursued avant-garde expression across changing subjects and styles. After World War II, he co-founded the Nagoya photography group VIVI with Kansuke Yamamoto, Minayoshi Takada, Yoshifumi Hattori, and others, and later became associated with the Japan Subjectivist Photography League.

His works are held in museum collections including the Tokyo Photographic Art Museum, the Nagoya City Art Museum, and the Metropolitan Museum of Art.

== Early life and prewar work ==
According to a recent profile published by MEM, Gotō was born in Nagoya, began exploring photography in childhood, and was later influenced by Surrealist artists such as Salvador Dalí and Max Ernst. After finishing school, he trained in photography and worked as an assistant editor for the magazine Kameraman; during and after the war, he focused on photojournalism in Nagoya.

Around 1938, Gotō became acquainted with Kansuke Yamamoto through Seidōsha, an amateur photography group in Nagoya, and the two remained close thereafter.

Museum catalogues and later exhibition materials, including the 2022 Tokyo Photographic Art Museum exhibition Avant-Garde Rising: The Photographic Vanguard in Modern Japan, document a body of prewar and wartime work by Gotō from the later 1930s to the early 1940s, much of it characterized by Surrealist-inflected montage and staged compositions. Works dated to this period include The Last Judgment, The Unreturning Stage, Valley Form, and Vanishing Landscape.

== VIVI and postwar avant-garde photography ==
After the war, Gotō became one of the founding members of VIVI, a Nagoya-based avant-garde photography group formed in 1947. MEM's account of postwar Nagoya photography describes the group as part of the revival of avant-garde photography in the city, as Yamamoto, Takada, Hattori, and Gotō sought new forms of expression under changing postwar conditions.

Gotō's role in VIVI is important for understanding the postwar continuation of experimental photography in Nagoya. Through the group, he remained closely connected to the same regional network that also sustained Yamamoto's postwar photographic and editorial activity.

The Metropolitan Museum of Art has contextualized his photograph Memorandum (1947), now in its collection, within this same postwar revival of avant-garde photography in Nagoya, linking it to the moment when Gotō and his collaborators founded VIVI.

== Subjective photography and later work ==
By the mid-1950s, Gotō had also become associated with subjective photography in Japan. Tokyo Art Beat describes him as a prominent Nagoya-based participant in the Japan Subjectivist Photography League, alongside Shūzō Takiguchi and Yamamoto. MEM likewise notes that he and Yamamoto participated in the First International Subjective Photography Exhibition held in Tokyo in 1956.

From the 1950s onward, Gotō was among the photographers who, together with figures such as Kansuke Yamamoto, provided guidance to the Chūbu Student Photography Federation in Nagoya.

MEM's 2024 profile further notes that Gotō held more than thirty solo exhibitions, won several photography awards, and published books including Woman Abstraction, Goto Keiichiro Photography Collection, and French Dolls. His works are held in collections including the Tokyo Photographic Art Museum and the Nagoya City Art Museum.

== Position in Nagoya photography ==
Gotō is relevant to the history of Photography in Nagoya as a figure linking prewar Surrealist-inflected and avant-garde photography to postwar experimental practice in the city. His career is also relevant to accounts of avant-garde photography in Japan, especially those that connect prewar experimentation in Nagoya with later postwar formations such as VIVI and the spread of subjective photography.

== Collections ==
Works by Gotō are held in the collections of the Tokyo Photographic Art Museum and the Nagoya City Art Museum. In 2025, the Metropolitan Museum of Art acquired his photograph Memorandum (1947).

== Selected exhibitions ==
Works by Gotō have been shown at institutions including the Nagoya City Art Museum, the Tokyo Photographic Art Museum and the Metropolitan Museum of Art.

=== Solo exhibitions ===
- 1945 – Japan no Sugata photo exhibition, Matsuzakaya, Nagoya.
- 1954 – Solo exhibitions at Matsushima Gallery, Ginza, and Maruzen Gallery, Nagoya.
- 1956 – Solo exhibitions at Matsushima Gallery, Ginza, and Maruzen Gallery, Nagoya.
- 1958 – Solo exhibitions at Konishiroku Gallery, Ginza, and Maruzen Gallery, Nagoya.
- 1959 – Solo exhibition at Konishiroku Gallery, Ginza.
- 1960 – Solo exhibition at Konishiroku Gallery, Ginza.
- 1962 – Solo exhibition at Matsuzakaya, Nagoya.
- 1963 – Solo exhibition at Fuji Photo Salon, Tokyo.
- 1965 – Solo exhibition at Fuji Photo Salon, Tokyo.

=== Group exhibitions ===
- 1950 – Exhibited Work A, Work B, and Work C at the 10th Bijutsu Bunka Association Exhibition, Tokyo Metropolitan Art Museum.
- 1952 – Exhibited in the Zōkei Shashin Sakka-ten, organized by members of the Bijutsu Bunka Association photography section.
- 1953 – Exhibited at the 13th Bijutsu Bunka Association Exhibition, Tokyo Metropolitan Art Museum.
- 1956 – Exhibited at the First International Subjective Photography Exhibition at Takashimaya in Nihonbashi.
- 1961 – Exhibited at the Third Photography as Art exhibition at the Metropolitan Museum of Art in New York.
- 1964 – Exhibited in Japan: Color 1964, the photography section of the Tokyo Olympic Art Exhibition.
- 2021 – Included in The Movement of Modern Photography in Nagoya 1911-1972, Nagoya City Art Museum.
- 2022 – Included in Avant-Garde Rising: The Photographic Vanguard in Modern Japan, Tokyo Photographic Art Museum.
- 2026 – Included in TOP Collection: Don't think. Feel., Tokyo Photographic Art Museum.

== Awards ==
- 1961 – Received the Japan Photo Critics Association Artist Award.
- 1963 – Received the Chunichi Cultural Award.
- 1974 – Received the Annual Award of the Photographic Society of Japan.
- 1976 – Received the Meritorious Service Award of the All-Japan Association of Photographic Societies.
- 1978 – Received the Order of the Aztec Eagle for the exhibition Mexico Fūbutsu Shashin-ten.

== See also ==
- Kansuke Yamamoto (artist)
- VIVI
- Photography in Nagoya
- Avant-garde photography in Japan
- Surrealism in Japan
- Surrealism in Nagoya
- Surrealist photography in Japan
