= Minayoshi Takada =

Japanese photographer associated with avant-garde photography in Nagoya

- 高田 皆義
- Born: 1899; Nagoya, Japan
- Died: 1982 (aged 82–83)
- Occupation: Photographer
- Known for: Modernist and constructivist photography in Japan; Co-founding VIVI; Publishing CARNET DE VIVI
- Movement: Modernism; Constructivism; Avant-garde photography

Minayoshi Takada (高田皆義, Takada Minayoshi; 1899–1982) was a Japanese photographer born in Aichi Prefecture and active in Nagoya. In October 1922, he founded the photography journal Gin no Tsubo (銀乃壺), and his work in the 1920s developed around the organization of line, plane, and tone. The History of Japanese Photography identifies Takada and Jun Tsusaka among the Nagoya photographers who drove constructivist photography at its peak around 1925 and helped chart a route toward modernism. After World War II, Takada co-founded the photographic group VIVI with Kansuke Yamamoto, Keiichirō Gotō, and Yoshifumi Hattori.

== Early career and prewar activity ==
A local history of Nagoya photography records that Takada exhibited in the third exhibition of the Aiyu Photography Club as a non-member and joined the club afterward. A 2025 catalogue published by the Shiga Museum of Art states that Takada worked for his family's securities company while studying photography under Shunyō Narita of the Aiyū Photography Club. At the club's fourth exhibition in 1921, Takada, Shōjirō Mikuni, Tokutarō Yokoi, and Narita exhibited bromide prints concerned with the effects of light. Takeba describes Takada as one of the younger Aiyū photographers who attracted national attention early in his career.

Takada founded Gin no Tsubo in October 1922. The second issue published his A Melodious Landscape, photographed at Tōjinbō; Takeba describes the work as reducing a stark cut-through landscape to black and white in an attempt to express a sense of "melody". In 1923, Takada published the essay "Shashingā no tsukurikata to kenkyū" in the journal, arguing that the arrangement of line, plane, and tone was central to photographic expression. In November of that year he founded the Chūō Kōgakai with Jun Tsusaka and others, and in April 1924 he formed the Nagoya Camera Club with Shōjirō Mikuni and others. A solo exhibition of Takada's work, organized by Photo Times, was held at the Shiseido Fine Art Department in Tokyo in October 1925.

At a year-end 1938 round-table on avant-garde photography organized by the editorial department of Kameraman, Takada and Niryū Nagata attended as interviewers and moderators. The discussion, which included Yoshio Shimozato, Chirū Yamanaka, and Minoru Sakata, was published as "Zen'ei shashin saikentō zadankai" in the February 1939 issue of Kameraman and addressed the differences between Surrealism and abstraction, the aesthetics of Surrealism, and automatism in photography.

The Nagoya City Art Museum annual report for the exhibition "The Story of the 'Capital of Photography': A History of Photography Movements in Nagoya, 1911-1972" also lists several of Takada's prewar works as having been reproduced in Kameraman, including Woman (1937), At the Seaside (1938), Summer Woman (1939), and still-life studies from 1938-39.

== VIVI and postwar avant-garde photography ==
After the war, Takada became one of the founding members of VIVI, a Nagoya-based avant-garde photography group formed in 1947 with Yamamoto, Gotō, Hattori, and others. MEM's exhibition summary on the Nagoya avant-garde describes the formation of VIVI as part of the revival of avant-garde photography in the city under postwar conditions. Through VIVI, Takada became part of the same postwar Nagoya network that linked Yamamoto to a renewed phase of experimental photographic practice.

== CARNET DE VIVI ==
Takada published the first issue of CARNET DE VIVI in June 1948. The Nagoya City Art Museum annual report records the item as VIVI-sha's bulletin, issued by Takada in a four-page folded booklet format. The bulletin provides documentary evidence of Takada's role in the publishing activity of the group as well as its exhibition activity.

== Position in Nagoya photography ==
Takada is relevant to the history of Photography in Nagoya as a figure linking the late-1930s avant-garde milieu in the city with the postwar activities of VIVI. His career is also relevant to accounts of avant-garde photography in Japan, especially those that connect Nagoya-based photographers such as Kansuke Yamamoto to broader histories of experimental and Surrealist-inflected photography.

== See also ==
- VIVI
- Kansuke Yamamoto (artist)
- Photography in Nagoya
- Surrealism in Nagoya
- Avant-garde photography in Japan
- The History of Japanese Photography
