= Buddhist Temple's Birdcage =

1940 photographic work by Kansuke Yamamoto

- 伽藍の鳥籠 (Japanese)
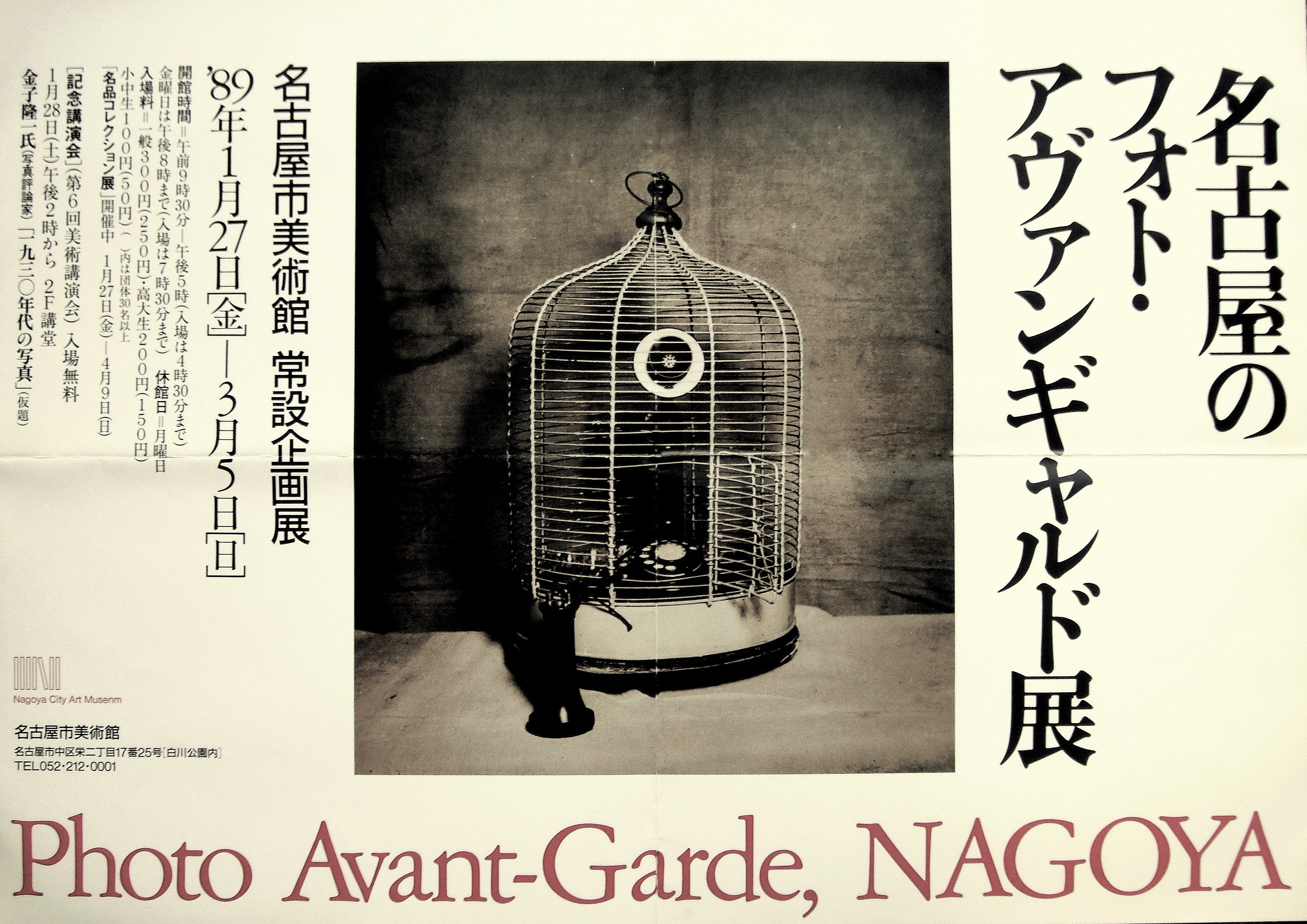
- 1989 photograph featuring Variation of "Buddhist Temple's Birdcage" in connection with Photo Avant-Garde, NAGOYA, Nagoya City Art Museum
- Artist: Kansuke Yamamoto
- Year: 1940
- Type: Photograph
- Movement: Surrealism
- Location: Art Institute of Chicago, Chicago

Buddhist Temple's Birdcage (伽藍の鳥籠, Garan no torikago; also rendered as Birdcage at a Buddhist Temple) is a 1940 photographic work by Kansuke Yamamoto. It was published as a sequence of two photographs in the second issue of Kōkaku in August 1940, together with Yamamoto's poem Garan no densetsu. The photographs were made as Surrealist activity in Japan came under increasing wartime censorship and police scrutiny. The work has been interpreted both as a critique of the silencing of critical thought and in relation to contemporary debates about the Surrealist object. One 1940 version is held by the Art Institute of Chicago, while a related variant is held by the Nagoya City Art Museum.

== Title and English renderings ==
English-language titles vary among publications. Jelena Stojkovic refers to the paired 1940 photographs as Birdcage at a Buddhist Temple (伽藍の鳥籠, Garan no torikago). Other English-language exhibition material uses Buddhist Temple's Birdcage. Majella Munro uses several other English titles and captions when discussing or reproducing Yamamoto's 1940 birdcage photographs, including Temple Speech, Buddhist Speech, and Buddhist Temple Birdcage. A related 1940 work in the collection of the Nagoya City Art Museum has been captioned in a later catalogue as Untitled (variant of "Birdcage at a Buddhist Temple").

== Work history: publication, sequence, and related poem ==
Garan no torikago appeared in contemporary photography writing before its publication in Kōkaku. A chronology compiled by Toshio Yamamoto records that Minoru Sakata's profile of Kansuke Yamamoto appeared in the July 1940 issue of Photo Times, and that it introduced Garan no torikago before Kōkaku II published both Garan no densetsu and Garan no torikago on 5 August 1940. Writing on Yamamoto's place in modern photography, Ryūichi Kaneko likewise notes that Sakata introduced three of Yamamoto's works in that July 1940 article, including Garan no torikago, and described his photographic attitude as that of a "poet of silver bromide".

Stojkovic notes that in the second issue of Kōkaku, published in August 1940, two photographs titled together as Birdcage at a Buddhist Temple were presented as a sequence with Yamamoto's poem Garan no densetsu. She also notes that Kōkaku, which ran to only two issues, was an outlet of the Independent Photography Research Association (Dokuritsu Shashin Kenkyūkai).

English translations of the poem also use different titles. Stojkovic calls it Buddhist Legend, while Amanda Maddox uses Legend of a Buddhist Temple and Munro reproduces it as Temple Address.

== Description ==
The work consists of two closely related photographs organized around the same central objects: a birdcage and a telephone receiver. In the first image, the receiver is placed inside the cage; in the second, it appears outside it. The change in the receiver's position links the two photographs as a sequence.

== Wartime censorship and police scrutiny ==
The photographs were made in a period when Surrealist publication and exhibition in Japan were increasingly exposed to censorship and police scrutiny. In Surrealism Beyond Borders, the Nagoya milieu is described as coming under growing wartime pressure: in 1939 the police banned Yoru no Funsui, the Surrealist journal Yamamoto had launched the year before, and the Nagoya Avant-Garde Club was dismantled. In the same catalogue's section "Under Pressure", Yamamoto is placed among the Japanese Surrealists who, under rising militarism in the late 1930s, were suspected of communist sympathies and arrested by the Special Higher Police for "subversive" work.

In 1940, the Nagoya Photo Avant-Garde changed its name to the Nagoya Photography Culture Association in an effort to reduce official scrutiny, and the group was dissolved in 1941. A 2025 City of Nagoya guide states that Yoru no Funsui, which Yamamoto had founded as a Surrealist poetry magazine, ended with its fourth issue in 1939 because of police censorship. Buddhist Temple's Birdcage appeared the following year.

== Interpretation ==
=== Censorship and freedom of speech ===
Stojkovic writes that the paired photographs "certainly offer a critique of the silencing of critical thought". Maddox similarly reads the telephone trapped inside the cage as an allusion to Yamamoto's own experience of being silenced. She notes that in one of the photographs the telephone's earpiece is outside the cage and suggests that this may represent the possibility of freedom.

=== Surrealist objects and the telephone receiver ===
Stojkovic argues that the photographs should not be understood only as a political allegory, but also in relation to contemporary debates about the Surrealist object and the popularity of Salvador Dalí's work in Japan.

Writing about Yamamoto's work from this period, Joe Takeba highlights a group of works in which Yamamoto arranged and staged everyday objects as ready-made objects.

Takeba writes that Yamamoto retained the objects' original meanings rather than using them simply for humor, presenting them instead as symbolic metaphors.

Stojkovic connects the disconnected telephone receiver with Dalí's use of the motif in Mountain Lake (1938), The Sublime Moment (1938), and Enigma of Hitler (1939). In Dalí's work, the receiver was associated with the failed negotiations between British prime minister Neville Chamberlain and Adolf Hitler in September 1938.

Shūzō Takiguchi published three articles on Dalí in July 1939, on the occasion of Dalí's exhibition at the Julien Levy Gallery in New York. In "Dalí's Recent Activities", published in Mizue, he noted the repeated telephone receiver in Dalí's recent work and discussed The Sublime Moment, although he did not discuss its political meaning. In "Two Portraits", published in Photo Times, Takiguchi described a photomontage by George Hoyningen-Huene that combined a portrait of Dalí and Gala with a reproduction of The Sublime Moment. In "Dalí Goes to America", published in Serupan, he discussed Enigma of Hitler and its political content. Stojkovic argues that the potential and meaning of the disconnected telephone receiver were therefore known to Yamamoto before he used the motif in his 1940 photographs.

Maddox also places the birdcage itself within Surrealist imagery. She compares Yamamoto's use of the cage with René Magritte's Le thérapeute (The Healer, 1937), in which a birdcage appears where a man's head would normally be. She also notes that André Breton had used the cage as a metaphor for experience confined by rational thought.

=== Constructed objects, photography, and materiality ===
Stojkovic also relates Buddhist Temple's Birdcage to Yamamoto's own writing on photography. In his 1940 article "A Concise Vilification with Regard to Photography", Yamamoto wrote that when the shutter is released, all things within the chosen angle "fly into a fixed mask". Stojkovic suggests that the birdcage can be read in relation to this idea of photographic capture.

She also connects the work with Yamamoto's distinction between materiality (busshitsu) and photographed objects (buttai). Stojkovic relates his search for "new correlations between objects" that "symbolize living content" to the contemporary Surrealist debate about the object.

Takeba similarly reads Yamamoto's compositions from this period as creating a poetic space through encounters between objects, at times producing what he calls an "event".

=== The accompanying poem ===
The photographs appeared in Kōkaku with Yamamoto's poem Garan no densetsu. Maddox notes that the poem begins with an empty birdcage and an uncaged bird, followed by "countless sparks". She reads this opening together with the telephone earpiece outside the cage as suggesting the possibility of freedom. Munro's English rendering includes apocalyptic and ritual imagery, while Maddox notes that the poem ends with an image of intense numbness.

Maddox also connects the poem to the title of the photographs, arguing that Yamamoto brings the cage and the Buddhist temple together as images that may suggest either worship or control.

=== Buddhism and competing readings ===
Munro discusses the Buddhist reference in the work as part of a wider debate about tradition and nationalism in Japanese Surrealism. She notes that John Solt took Yamamoto's description of himself as "self-conscious of the spirit of Japanese romanticism" as a capitulation to nationalist ideology. Toshio Yamamoto, by contrast, reads the photograph as a criticism of state censorship and of "genbunichi", which Munro describes as a project to standardize kanji in common use that was tied to laws controlling print media.

Munro argues that the imprisoned telephone supports Toshio Yamamoto's reading of the photograph as a protest against restrictions on free speech. She also reads the Buddhist reference in the title as an example of state-sanctioned orthodoxy. Munro asks whether the title may also imply criticism of the support given by Buddhist temples to the Japanese military during the war, but presents this as a possibility rather than a definite interpretation. Munro concludes that Buddhism is invoked subversively in the work and argues that the critical use of the reference, rather than the reference itself, gives it its avant-garde character.

== Variants and related photographs ==
A related 1940 work reproduced in a later exhibition publication is captioned Untitled (variant of "Birdcage at a Buddhist Temple"), indicating that the configuration associated with Buddhist Temple's Birdcage circulated in more than one form. Stojkovic further notes that Yamamoto returned in 1940 to the disconnected telephone receiver in Landscape (Fūkei), published in the October issue of VOU. Stojkovic treats the Birdcage photographs and Landscape as repeated uses of the disconnected telephone receiver in Yamamoto's work in 1940. Maddox notes that Yamamoto continued to use the birdcage as a motif in later photographs and poetry.

== Collections ==
The principal 1940 work is now held by the Art Institute of Chicago. A related 1940 photograph is held by the Nagoya City Art Museum, where later catalogues have reproduced it as Untitled (variant of "Birdcage at a Buddhist Temple"). The museum's collection database lists that related work under the Japanese title ［『伽藍の鳥籠』のヴァリエーション］, gives its date as 1940, and records it as a gelatin silver print.

== Later exhibition and publication history ==
Jelena Stojkovic's essay on the Osaka and Nagoya photo clubs in the 2021 catalogue Surrealism Beyond Borders discusses photography in Nagoya as an important site of Surrealist activity outside Tokyo. The catalogue reproduces Garan no torikago and a related 1940 variant in this discussion. The same volume discusses Yamamoto in its "Under Pressure" section on Surrealist activity under authoritarian rule and wartime repression.

Surrealism Beyond Borders was organized by the Metropolitan Museum of Art and Tate Modern. It was shown at the Metropolitan Museum of Art from 11 October 2021 to 30 January 2022 and at Tate Modern from 24 February to 29 August 2022.

The related photograph in the Nagoya City Art Museum has continued to appear in later scholarship and exhibition catalogues. The 2024 catalogue The 100th Anniversary of the Surrealist Manifesto: Surrealism and Japan captions it as Untitled (variant of "Birdcage at a Buddhist Temple"), while the museum's collection database records it as a 1940 gelatin silver print.

== See also ==
- Surrealism in Japan
