= Georges Hugnet =

French surrealist artist (1906–1974)

- Born: 11 July 1906
- Died: 26 June 1974 (aged 67)
- Movement: Dada, surrealism

Georges Hugnet (11 July 1906 – 26 June 1974) was a French graphic artist. He was also active as a poet, writer, art historian, bookbinding designer, critic and film director. Hugnet was a figure in the Dada movement and Surrealism. He was the author of the collage novel Le septième face du dé (1936).

Hugnet wrote about the "Exposition surrealiste internationale", saying "Les artistes surrealists ... se sensetaient tous l'ame de Pygmalion ... On put voir les heureux posseurs de mannequins...arrive. munis de mysterieux petits ou grands paquets, hommages a leurs bien-aimees, contenant les cadeaux les plus disaparates." Lewis Kachur translates this as "The Surrealist artists all felt they had the soul of Pygmalion. One could see the happy owners of mannequins ... come in, furnished with mysterious little or big bundles, tokens for their beloved, containing the most unlikely presents."

There is an inventory of his papers in the Carlton Lake Collection at the Harry Ransom Humanities Research Center of the University of Texas at Austin.
