= VIVI (photography group) =

Japanese postwar avant-garde photography collective (formed 1947)

- Other name(s): VIVI-sha (VIVI社)
- Known for: Postwar avant-garde photography collective based in Nagoya
- Founded: 1947; Nagoya, Japan
- Location: Nagoya, Japan

Membership
- Founder(s): Kansuke Yamamoto (山本悍右); Keiichirō Gotō (後藤敬一郎); Minayoshi Takada (高田皆義); Yoshifumi Hattori (服部義文)
- Notable members: Kansuke Yamamoto; Keiichirō Gotō; Minayoshi Takada; Yoshifumi Hattori

Art
- Art type: Photography collective
- Style: Avant-garde photography
- Movement: Postwar Japanese avant-garde photography

VIVI (VIVI社; VIVI-sha) was a Japanese postwar avant-garde photography collective founded in Nagoya in 1947 by Kansuke Yamamoto, Keiichirō Gotō, Minayoshi Takada, and Yoshifumi Hattori. Photography historian Ryūichi Kaneko describes VIVI as the first postwar photographic collective in Nagoya.

In his history of photography in Nagoya, Jō Takeba discusses the group under the heading "Revival of the Avant-Garde" (前衛の復活). The group's 1949 exhibition included Kiyoji Ōtsuji, Yasushi Takabayashi, and Teruyoshi Tokuyama, while works by Hans Bellmer were shown as a special contribution.

== History ==
=== Formation ===
In the late 1930s, avant-garde photographic activity in Nagoya was affected by wartime restrictions and censorship. In 1939, Yamamoto was interrogated by the police and released on the condition that he cease publication of his Surrealist journal Yoru no Funsui.

Yamamoto, Gotō, Takada, and Hattori formed VIVI in Nagoya in 1947. A collection note published by the Metropolitan Museum of Art for Gotō's Memorandum (1947) states that Gotō and his collaborators founded VIVI after the war to revive Nagoya's avant-garde scene. In 1949, Yamamoto joined the Bijutsu Bunka Kyōkai, which established a photography section that year.

=== Exhibitions ===
Published sources differ in their numbering of VIVI's exhibitions. The Yamamoto chronology published by Tokyo Station Gallery in 2001 and a curriculum vitae published by Taka Ishii Gallery identify the exhibitions held in 1948, 1949, and 1950 as the first, second, and third VIVI exhibitions. Soeda's later study identifies an additional exhibition in 1947 and numbers the Nagoya exhibitions held between 1947 and 1950 as the first through fourth.

- November 17–19, 1947 – an exhibition at Maruzen's third-floor gallery in Nagoya, identified by Soeda as the first VIVI exhibition.
- July 2–7, 1948 – an exhibition at Maruzen's third-floor gallery in Nagoya, identified by Soeda as the second VIVI exhibition. The 2001 Yamamoto chronology and Taka Ishii Gallery identify the 1948 exhibition as the first VIVI exhibition. Yamamoto exhibited Siegfried Phenomenon at a VIVI exhibition in 1948. A further VIVI exhibition was held at Maruzen in Kyoto from July 22 to 27.
- July 31–August 6, 1949 – an exhibition at Maruzen's third-floor gallery in Nagoya, identified by Soeda as the third VIVI exhibition and by the 2001 Yamamoto chronology as the second. Kiyoji Ōtsuji, Yasushi Takabayashi, and Teruyoshi Tokuyama participated, while works by Hans Bellmer were shown as a special contribution. According to the Yamamoto chronology, Yamamoto exhibited works including Yūutsu na sanpo, Jiikufurīdo gensō, A Chronicle of Drifting, and Icarus's Episode.
- December 14–19, 1950 – an exhibition at Maruzen's third-floor gallery in Nagoya, identified by Soeda as the fourth VIVI exhibition and by the 2001 Yamamoto chronology and Taka Ishii Gallery as the third. The Yamamoto chronology records Tsugio Tajima as a participant.

Soeda writes that VIVI members increasingly presented their work through the Bijutsu Bunka Kyōkai after the 1950 exhibition and that VIVI subsequently became less clearly defined as a separate group. He also notes that the VIVI name continued to appear for some time in later exhibition material. Among works by VIVI members from these years, Yamamoto's Icarus's Episode (1949) is held by the Museum of Modern Art, Yamamoto's A Chronicle of Drifting (1949) is held by the J. Paul Getty Museum, and Gotō's Memorandum (1947) is held by the Metropolitan Museum of Art.

== Membership ==
=== Founders ===
VIVI was founded by Yamamoto, Gotō, Takada, and Hattori.

- Kansuke Yamamoto (山本悍右)
- Minayoshi Takada (高田皆義)
- Keiichirō Gotō (後藤敬一郎)
- Yoshifumi Hattori (服部義文)

=== Other participants ===
Other photographers took part in individual VIVI exhibitions. The 1949 Nagoya exhibition included Kiyoji Ōtsuji (大辻清司), Yasushi Takabayashi (高林靖), and Teruyoshi Tokuyama (徳山暉芳). Works by Hans Bellmer (ハンス・ベルメール) were shown at the same exhibition as a special contribution. Tsugio Tajima (田島二男) participated in the December 1950 exhibition.

== Activities and photographic approach ==
An overview published by MEM describes VIVI as having been formed in 1947 to revive Nagoya's avant-garde spirit and notes that the group began organizing exhibitions. The group also published the bulletin CARNET DE VIVI. Its first issue appeared on June 20, 1948 and was published by Minayoshi Takada.

The 2001 Yamamoto chronology quotes a review of the December 1950 VIVI exhibition that described the recurring exhibitions as bringing a fresh spirit and an avant-garde impulse to Nagoya's art scene. The same review described VIVI's Surrealist works as humorous and cruel and referred to their search for new assemblages of objects through strongly sensory methods.

In a 1950 survey of postwar avant-garde photography, critic Nobuya Abe wrote that Yamamoto's dream imagery could not simply be dismissed as an adult fairy tale and described it as creating a new beauty marked by sharp irony. Minayoshi Takada also used experimental photographic techniques in his work. MEM describes Takada's work as combining Surrealist and Constructivist approaches and notes his use of double negatives and transparencies to produce composite images.

== Reception and scholarship ==
In a 2018 review of an exhibition on Keiichirō Gotō and Subjective Photography, photography critic Kōtarō Iizawa described VIVI as an avant-garde photography group formed in 1947 that stood out at a time when realism dominated the Japanese photography world.

Eiko Aoki discusses VIVI in her 2013 review of the Getty Museum exhibition Japan's Modern Divide. Aoki notes that Yamamoto formed VIVI in Nagoya in 1947 and that the group provided a forum through which he could stage local exhibitions. She also observes that, during much of his life, Yamamoto's activity was known largely within a relatively small circle.

In his study of Keiichirō Gotō, Kazuho Soeda reconstructs four VIVI exhibitions between 1947 and 1950. Soeda notes that members increasingly shifted their main venue of presentation to the Bijutsu Bunka Kyōkai and that VIVI became less clearly defined as a separate group after the 1950 exhibition. He also points to the reuse of an illustration by Yamamoto from the prewar journal Yoru no Funsui in VIVI exhibition material. Soeda discusses this reuse in connection with the group's awareness of continuity with prewar avant-garde activity while also seeking to move beyond it.

In The Story of the "City of Photography": A History of Nagoya Photographic Movements, 1911–1972, Jō Takeba places VIVI under the heading "Revival of the Avant-Garde". Takeba discusses VIVI within a chapter on the postwar relationship between realism and Subjective Photography. The book records the group's bulletin as CARNET DE VIVI.

== Later activities ==
In 1953, Yamamoto joined Gotō, Takada, Tatsuo Kondō, and others in forming the photography group Mado (窓). In 1955, Yamamoto formed the Tōkai photographers' group Honō (炎) with Gotō, Tatsuo Kondō, Katsuhiko Okazaki, Kaoru Utsumi, and others. Materials relating to VIVI, including the first issue of CARNET DE VIVI from June 1948, were later included in Nagoya City Art Museum documentation of the city's photography history.

== See also ==
- Nagoya Photo Avant-Garde
- Photography in Nagoya
- Surrealism in Nagoya
- Avant-garde photography in Japan
- Surrealist photography in Japan
- Japan Subjective Photography League
- Shinkō shashin
