= Hans Bellmer =

German artist and photographer

- Born: 13 March 1902; Kattowitz, German Empire
- Died: 24 February 1975 (aged 72); Paris, France
- Known for: Photography, sculpture, drawing, printmaking, and painting
- Notable work: Die Puppe (1934), La Poupée (1935), L'Anatomie de l'image (1957)
- Movement: Surrealism, Berlin Dada

Hans Bellmer (13 March 1902 – 24 February 1975) was a German artist, best known for the life-sized female dolls he produced in the mid-1930s and for the drawings and prints that occupied much of his later career. He photographed the dolls in shifting assemblages, and historians of art and photography also consider him a Surrealist photographer. In 1947 he made six etchings for a clandestine Paris edition of Georges Bataille's Histoire de l'œil, published by K éditeur and falsely dated "Séville, 1940".

== Early life ==
Bellmer was born in Kattowitz, then in the German Empire (now Katowice, Poland), into a Protestant bourgeois family. His father directed him toward factory and mine work in Upper Silesia and, in 1923, sent him to Berlin to study engineering at the Technische Hochschule, now the Technical University of Berlin. Bellmer abandoned those studies. Already in contact in Berlin with the Dadaists George Grosz and John Heartfield, he chose in 1924 to work as a painter. He was employed as a typographer, book illustrator and industrial draughtsman, and made a brief stay in Paris in 1926. He later married Margarete, who suffered from tuberculosis.

== The dolls ==
Sketch for the Die Puppe series, 1932

In early 1933, when Hitler came to power, Bellmer decided, in his words, to cease "all socially useful work" as a "refusal ... against German fascism and the prospect of war". With his brother Fritz, a trained engineer, he began to construct a life-sized female doll. The art historian Sue Taylor has related the project to three events in his personal life: the arrival in Berlin in 1932 of a teenage cousin, Ursula Naguschewski; a performance of Jacques Offenbach's The Tales of Hoffmann, in which a man falls in love with the automaton Olympia; and a box of his childhood toys sent by his mother. Bellmer wrote of a need "to construct an artificial girl with anatomical possibilities ... capable of re-creating the heights of passion even to inventing new desires."

The first doll, made in Berlin in 1933, is known from photographs Bellmer took as it was being built. It was a life-sized assemblage of wood, flax fibre, plaster and glue, with a mask-like head, glass eyes and a wig; it had no arms, and was shown as a skeletal framework, a coy adolescent, or a heap of separated parts. In his essay "Memories of the Doll Theme" (1934), published with the photographs, Bellmer described "young maidens" in explicitly sexual terms.

His 1934 book Die Puppe (The Doll), printed privately in a small edition at his expense, contains ten black-and-white photographs of the first doll. A two-page spread in the winter 1934–35 issue of the Surrealist journal Minotaure introduced the work to readers in France: eighteen photographs grouped around the title "Poupée: variations sur le montage d'une mineure articulée" ("Doll: Variations on the Montage of an Articulated Minor"). In 1935 Henri Parisot brought Bellmer to Paris and introduced him to the Surrealist group around André Breton. A French edition, La Poupée, translated by Robert Valançay, was issued by Guy Lévis Mano in 1936.

To make the figure more fully manipulable, Bellmer built a second doll in 1935, organised around a spherical belly and the principle of the ball joint. He had been prompted by a pair of sixteenth-century articulated wooden dolls in the Kaiser Friedrich Museum. The new doll's parts—legs, stylised breasts, torso, pelvises, arms, and the head and hand reused from the first doll—could be combined in many arrangements. From 1935 to 1938 he photographed it in more than a hundred images, many of them hand-coloured, now set in domestic interiors, a cellar, a hayloft or a forest rather than documented as a work in progress. He also made the construction later known as La Mitrailleuse en état de grâce (The Machine Gun[neress] in a State of Grace), now in the Museum of Modern Art. In late 1935 or early 1936 he sent photographs of the second doll to Paris, where they appeared in Minotaure and in Cahiers d'Art. After he moved to Paris, Paul Éluard wrote short poems to accompany fourteen of the photographs. A planned 1939 publication by Christian Zervos collapsed at the outbreak of war; the complete collaboration was published in Paris in 1949, in an edition of 136, as Les Jeux de la poupée (The Games of the Doll).

== Exile and war ==
Following the death of his wife in February 1938, Bellmer left Nazi Germany and settled in Paris, where the Surrealists received his work.

When the Second World War began he was in the south of France. On 3 September 1939, as a German national, he was ordered to report for internment and was taken to the Camp des Milles, a former brickworks near Aix-en-Provence, where he shared quarters with Max Ernst and made portraits of fellow internees. After five months he was sent to labour at Forcalquier, and in May 1940 he and the printmaker Ferdinand Springer were assigned to a camp at Meslay-du-Maine. During the subsequent evacuation a goods train took him to Toulouse. To avoid Vichy police checks he discarded his passport; he then used his skill as a forger to make stamps and false identity papers for the French Resistance, including papers in the name Jean Bellmer. Until the Liberation he lived precariously between Castres, Revel, Carcassonne and Toulouse, supporting himself with portraits and meeting the writer Joë Bousquet. In these years he also began the theoretical writing later published as L'Anatomie de l'image.

== Drawings and prints ==
Drawing had been part of Bellmer's practice since adolescence, and he had been trained in the precise line of an engineering sketch and in the verism of New Objectivity. Even during the doll years he produced highly finished drawings, and the Centre Pompidou has described drawing as the central thread of his work, running from the most private miniature studies to later, almost abstract diagrams of the body. In 1939 he and the poet Georges Hugnet published Œillades ciselées en branche, a small book with twenty-five of Bellmer's drawings of girls, reproduced in heliogravure with burin retouching: the beginning of his work in print.

After the war he devoted himself increasingly to drawings, etchings and other prints in which the body is taken apart and recomposed. His line is fine and anatomical; limbs, organs and orifices are multiplied or exchanged, as in the "cephalopods"—female heads joined to legs—and in studies of articulated hands. In an untitled drawing of 1936, Taylor writes, "a breast, buttocks, legs in striped hose, and high-heeled boots all blend with phallic forms". In his illustrations for Sade and Bataille he multiplied variations on the theme of the androgyne, and in the 1950s these exchanges extended to his own image, fused with Zürn's in Céphalopodie à deux (c. 1955).

His later drawings, often on grey or pink paper and worked in gouache, watercolour or coloured inks, became increasingly schematic, almost geometric diagrams, as in L'Éducation prénatale (1958); he had already made colour prints such as the lithograph Articulated Hands (1954). He set out the thinking behind these anatomical permutations in his 1957 treatise Petite anatomie de l'inconscient physique ou l'Anatomie de l'image.

In 1947, at the initiative of Alain Gheerbrant of K éditeur, he and Bataille met for a new, clandestine edition of Histoire de l'œil. Bellmer supplied six heliogravures reworked with the burin. The book was printed in Paris in an edition of 199 copies and falsely dated "Séville, 1940" to evade censorship. These were his first original etchings. He later made illustrations for Bataille's Madame Edwarda (1955) and for the Marquis de Sade, including the suites À Sade (1960) and Petit traité de morale (1968), as well as Les Marionnettes after Heinrich von Kleist's essay On the Marionette Theatre (1969) and etchings for Lautréamont's Les Chants de Maldoror (1971). From 1966, after a meeting with the publisher Georges Visat, the printmaker Cécile Reims engraved Bellmer's drawings in burin and drypoint, and she remained his principal interpretive engraver into the early 1970s.

== Theory of the body ==
The ball joint of the second doll was for Bellmer a conceptual principle as well as a construction device. A 2006 Centre Pompidou essay called it a decisive discovery, the mechanism around which every bodily possibility could pivot without limit: the figure could be taken apart and put together again in endless combinations. In 1938 he wrote "Notes on the Subject of the Ball Joint," later used as the preface to Les Jeux de la poupée, in which he argued that, in the body's sense of itself, parts can stand for or symbolize others, so that consciousness may be diverted from the "centre 'sex'" to the armpit. Sue Taylor has described this substitution of parts as the method behind the second doll's permutations. Bellmer said that the anagram was "the key to all my work," and he called the second doll "a series of endless anagrams." Rosalind Krauss, writing on the photographs, called each new version a "construction as dismemberment." Foster read that dismemberment as signifying castration, and the multiplication of parts as its fetishistic defence, "phallic substitutes". The Pompidou essay lists the exchanges of his later work as eye/sex, sex/armpit, buttock/phallus and shoulder/shoe. Bellmer himself described "the peculiar hermaphrodite interconnection between the male and the female principles in which the female structure predominates".

He developed these ideas at length in Petite anatomie de l'inconscient physique ou l'Anatomie de l'image (1957), a treatise written mainly between 1941 and 1946 and later issued in English as Little Anatomy of the Physical Unconscious, or The Anatomy of the Image, translated by Jon Graham (Dominion, 2004). There he proposed a "physical unconscious," which the Pompidou essay distinguishes from Freud's psychic unconscious: the body, structured like language, is subject to displacements of sensation, mutations of meaning, permutations of organs and symmetrical reversals, in a combinatory system without limit. The body, he wrote, "resembles a sentence which seems to invite us to dismember it into its component letters, so that it will reveal in an endless row of anagrams the reality that it contains." Of such work he also said: "What is at stake here is a totally new unity of form, meaning and feeling: language-images that cannot simply be thought up or written up ... They constitute new, multifaceted objects, resembling polyplanes made of mirrors ... As if the illogical was relaxation, as if laughter was permitted while thinking, as if error was a way and chance, a proof of eternity."

Bellmer's interest in Heinrich von Kleist's 1810 essay On the Marionette Theatre belongs to the same line of thought. He illustrated a French edition of the essay in the 1969 print suite Les Marionnettes. The World Encyclopedia of Puppetry Arts notes that, from 1933, his figures were conceived as "anagrams of the body," bodies whose centre of gravity can be displaced at will, each time determining a new arrangement of the organs.

== Later life and death ==
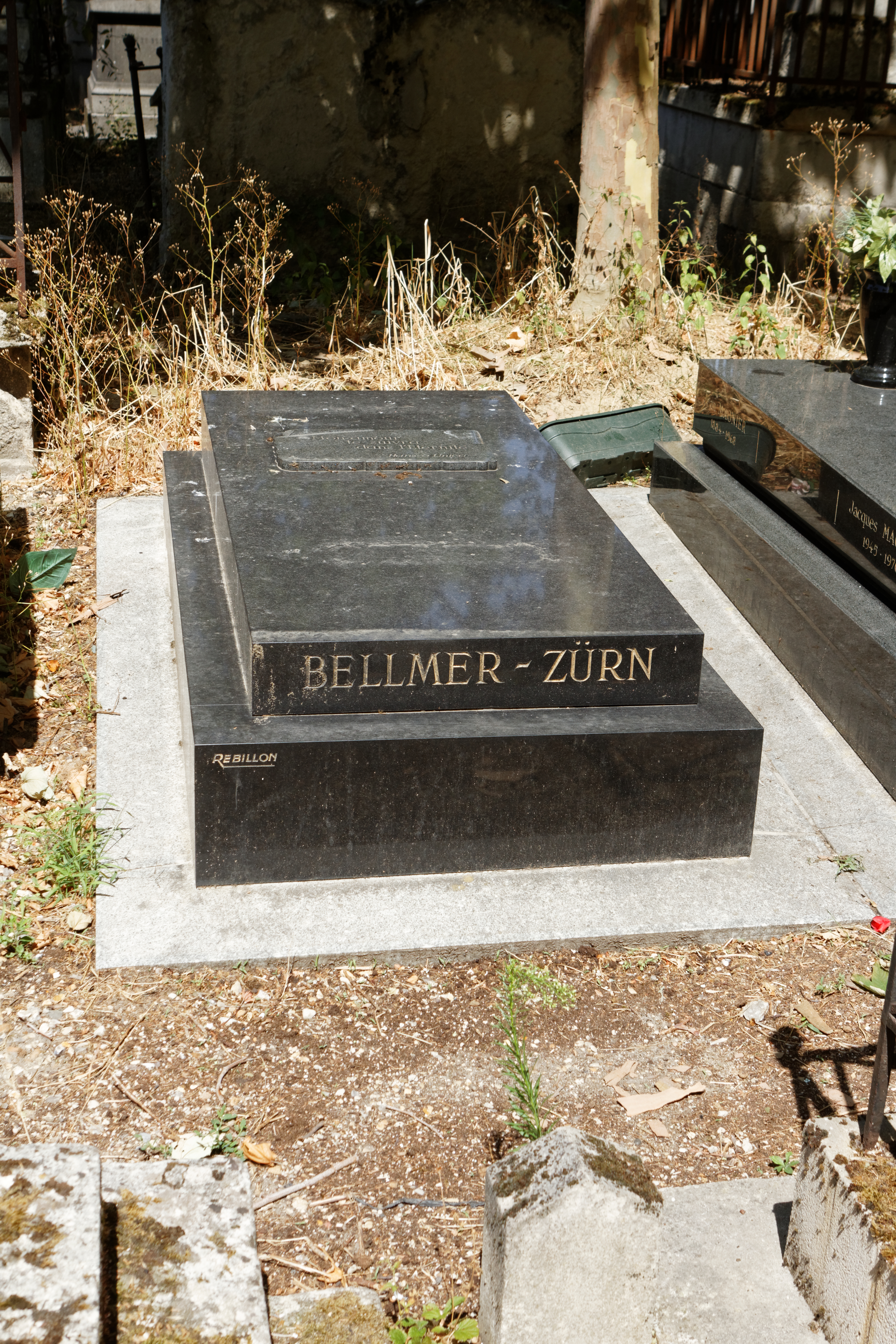
Bellmer and Zürn's gravestone at the Père Lachaise Cemetery.

Bellmer returned to Paris in 1949 and lived there for the rest of his life. His work reached Japan early: in 1949 it was shown in Nagoya in the second exhibition of the photography collective VIVI-sha, co-founded by the photographer-poet Kansuke Yamamoto. On a first return to Berlin at the end of 1953 he met the artist and writer Unica Zürn, who moved to Paris with him in 1954 and became his companion. In 1958 he photographed her naked torso bound with string; one of the images, captioned "Tenir au frais" ("Keep cool"), appeared on the cover of Le Surréalisme, même that year. Zürn was later repeatedly hospitalised for mental illness and died by suicide in 1970.

Retrospectives of his work were held in Hanover in 1967 and at the Centre national d'art contemporain in Paris in 1971. In his last years he lived withdrawn in a small Left Bank apartment, seriously ill and paralysed. He died in Paris on 24 February 1975 of bladder cancer. He was buried beside Zürn at Père Lachaise Cemetery in a tomb marked "Bellmer – Zürn".

== Reception and controversy ==
Bellmer framed the dolls as a refusal of German fascism, and several later accounts have followed that line. Hal Foster has argued that they "attack fascist armoring with the effects of sexuality" and "confound the fascist insistence on bodily separation". Reviewing the 2001 International Center of Photography retrospective, curated by Therese Lichtenstein, Vicki Goldberg reported Lichtenstein's view that the dolls were an attack on "the insistent propaganda of normalcy and the cult of the perfect body in German culture". Leslie Camhi wrote that, unlike John Heartfield's political photomontages, "Bellmer's main weapon of resistance was his utter frivolity", and that in a culture that "idolized health and women's procreative function, he erected tender and violent altars to useless depravity". Taylor has noted that the enthusiastic French reception of the doll photographs in Minotaure in 1934 owed something to the Surrealist idealization of the femme-enfant, which "coincided" with Bellmer's "stated preoccupation with little girls as subjects for his art", though she adds that these concerns "were arrived at separately".

Other critics have argued that this political framing does not exhaust the work, or that it risks softening its sexual violence. Foster also wrote that "the psychic shattering (the convulsive identity) of the male subject may depend upon the physical shattering (the compulsive beauty) of the female image". Camhi described the doll as "an infinitely malleable, innocent victim over whom he exercised fantasies of total control and domination". Mark Stevens, reviewing the same exhibition, wrote that Lichtenstein's account "turns Bellmer into a kind of historical art hero", so that "this connoisseur of erotically broken adolescent girls can be regarded as something more than a sublime monster; he becomes an artist of conscience who resisted the Nazis' indecent demand for decency". "All that may be true," Stevens added, "but it's also important not to tame this particular artist." Goldberg cautioned that although the dolls "can certainly be read" as questioning the social construction of gender and sexuality in 1930s German culture, "it is tricky to impute a 1970's motive to a 1930's artist".

Sue Taylor has emphasised the "explicit sexual implications" of Bellmer's images of "young maidens". Reviewing the 2006 Whitechapel Gallery retrospective, Sally O'Reilly noted that Bellmer and Pierre Klossowski had seen the writings of the Marquis de Sade and Freudian psychoanalysis "as modes of retaliation against Fascism", but wrote that it is "difficult ... not to view Bellmer's dolls as antiquated embodiments of fetishism", and that "the surgical precision of Bellmer's pencil or pen-and-ink lines, carving up bodies ... and puncturing and binding the female form, is quite terrifying". Robert Hughes described Bellmer as a "sexual obsessive" whose doll "represented not a grown-up woman but a prepubescent child", and as one "who loved mulling over themes of child rape, dismemberment, and general sexual nastiness". Goldberg wrote that Bellmer "speaks directly to the dark underside of sexuality", to "the dominant-submissive, sado-masochistic, voyeuristic, even pedophilic impulses that hover often unacknowledged at the edge of consciousness", and reported that late in life Bellmer told his companion that "if he hadn't made so much art about young girls, he might have committed sex murder". Taylor has written that several late drawings and prints "depict the artist himself having sex with two children".

Some writers have read the work psychoanalytically, as a defence against the desires it depicts. Sue Taylor has interpreted the brick walls that recur in his drawings as "icons of disavowal or denial", with which "the artist literalizes and externalizes his defensive response to shock"; drawing on the psychoanalyst Phyllis Greenacre, she argues that such a wall also protects against being overcome by one's own "primitive instinctual drives, both aggressive and sexual". Therese Lichtenstein quoted Bellmer describing the creation of the dolls as "the remedy, the compensation for a certain impossibility of living".

Critics have also discussed Bellmer's 1958 photographs of Unica Zürn bound with string. Camhi wrote that an image of Zürn's "seemingly headless body, tied up like a sausage, disturbs as viscerally as the doll did". Taylor described the photographs as manipulating "the female body for the purposes of a complexly motivated male imaginary", and argued that Zürn's "tragic psychological vulnerability, which culminated in suicide in 1970, renders it especially disturbing". She quoted Zürn's remark that the person "who is sketched by him, or photographed ... participates with Bellmer in the abomination of herself". Valery Oisteanu, reviewing a 2012 exhibition of their work, called the couple "co-conspirators in overt sadomasochistic eroticism" and wrote that "Zürn's mental illness darkened the last decade of Bellmer's life".

The work has also been subject to official and institutional restriction. According to Fabrice Flahutez, half the stock of the 1947 clandestine edition of Histoire de l'œil was destroyed at the printer by the French Ministry of the Interior and the police. When the Centre Pompidou retrospective travelled to the Whitechapel Gallery in 2006, several lenders objected after works were withdrawn on the eve of the opening. The Pompidou curator Agnès de la Beaumelle told Le Monde, The Art Newspaper reported, that the Whitechapel's director, Iwona Blazwick, had said she was removing works that might cause offence to the local Muslim population and to anti-paedophile groups, and had described the works as "sulphurous". The Whitechapel and the Pompidou both stated that the London display had been reduced because of a lack of space; one lender called the dispute "a fuss about nothing".

== Legacy and influence ==
Leslie Camhi, reviewing a 2001 retrospective at the International Center of Photography, wrote that Bellmer's doll "still casts her shadow over Cindy Sherman's hermaphroditic grotesqueries", as well as over work by Robert Gober and others. Sherman's Sex Pictures of the 1990s, composed from anatomical models, masks and doll parts, have been exhibited and discussed alongside Bellmer's dolls.

The 2004 anime film Ghost in the Shell 2: Innocence draws on Bellmer's dolls. The director Mamoru Oshii has referred to the dolls as an inspiration for the film.

== Exhibitions ==
- 1963: Galerie Daniel Cordier, Paris; "Hans Bellmer"
- 1966: Robert Fraser Gallery, London; Bellmer's de Sade Engravings
- 1967: Kestner-Gesellschaft, Hanover; Kunst-Verein, Berlin; Galerie Wolfgang Ketterer, Munich; "Hans Bellmer"
- 1970: Stedelijk Museum, Amsterdam; "Hans Bellmer"
- 1971: Centre national d'art contemporain, Paris; "Hans Bellmer" (retrospective)
- 1975: Museum of Contemporary Art, Chicago; "Hans Bellmer, Drawings and Sculpture"
- 1976: Galerie André Francois Petit, Paris; Galerie Brusberg, Hanover; "Hommage à Hans Bellmer"
- 1983: Centre Georges Pompidou and Filipacchi, Paris; "Hans Bellmer, Photographe"
- 1984: Kestner-Gesellschaft, Hanover; "Hans Bellmer, Photographien"
- 1985: Editions Graphiques, London; "Hans Bellmer"
- 1990: Isidore Ducasse Fine Arts, New York; "Hans Bellmer"
- 1991: Krannert Art Museum, Champaign, IL; Hans Bellmer: Photographs
- 1992: Musée Saint-Roch, Issoudun; "Hans Bellmer par son Graveur Cécile Reims"
- 1997: Musée-Galerie de la Seita, Paris; "Bellmer Graveur, 1902–1975"
- 1999: Ubu Gallery, New York; Galerie Berinson, Berlin; "Photographs and Drawings for the 30s"
- 2001: International Center of Photography, New York; Behind Closed Doors: The Art of Hans Bellmer
- 2006: Centre Georges Pompidou, Paris, 1 March – 22 May, "Hans Bellmer: Anatomie du désir"; Staatliche Graphische Sammlung München, 21 June – 20 August; Whitechapel Gallery, London, 18 September – 19 November
- 2010: Sammlung Scharf-Gerstenberg, Berlin; Double Sexus: Bellmer – Bourgeois, 24 April – 15 August

== Bibliography ==
- Die Puppe, 1934.
- La Poupée, 1936. (Translated to French by Robert Valançay)
- Trois Tableaux, Sept Dessins, Un Texte, 1944.
- Les Jeux de la Poupée, 1949. (Text by Bellmer with Poems by Paul Éluard)
- "Post-scriptum," from Hexentexte by Unica Zürn, 1954.
- L'Anatomie de l'image, 1957.
- Little Anatomy of the Physical Unconscious, or The Anatomy of the Image, translated by Jon Graham, Waterbury Center, Vermont, Dominion, 2004, ISBN 978-0-9712044-2-3
- "Le Père" in Le Surréalisme Même, No. 4, Spring 1958. (Translated to French by Robert Valançay in 1936)
- "Strip-tease" in Le Surréalisme Même, No. 4, Spring 1958.
- Friedrich Schröder-Sonnenstern, 1959.
- Die Puppe: Die Puppe, Die Spiele der Puppe, und Die Anatomie des Bildes, 1962. (Text by Bellmer with Poems by Éluard)
- Oracles et Spectacles, 1965.
- Mode d'Emploi, 1967.
- "88, Impasse de l'Espérance," 1975. (Originally written in 1960 for an uncompleted book by Gisèle Prassinos entitled L'Homme qui a Perdu son Squelette)
- The Doll, translated and with an introduction by Malcolm Green in a facsimile of the 1962 German edition, London, Atlas Press, 2005, ISBN 978-1-900565-14-1
