= Avant-garde photography in Japan =

Avant-garde and experimental photography in Japan, chiefly in the 1930s–1940s

Avant-garde photography in Japan refers to experimental photographic practices associated with Japan's interwar period and early wartime modernism, developing within and alongside the milieu of shinkō shashin (新興写真, "New Photography"). The phrase is used here as an umbrella term linking the broader interwar modernist milieu commonly described as shinkō shashin and the narrower late-1930s "zen'ei" moment in which "avant-garde photography" was explicitly debated and claimed as a public identity. Photographers and critics explored new techniques and procedures—including photomontage, photocollage, and photograms—and adapted ideas and methods associated with Surrealism into photographic work.

Histories of the period often treat the 1931 arrival of the German International Traveling Photography Exhibition (the photographic component of Film und Foto) in Japan as a turning point, coinciding with an expanding culture of photographic magazines and amateur clubs. From 1937 to 1940, a short-lived zen'ei (前衛, "avant-garde") moment became visible in some circles, but wartime cultural and ideological controls made the term politically fraught and encouraged substitutes such as shashin zōkei (写真造形) and shashin bunka (写真文化).

Rather than forming a single organization, these practices circulated through overlapping regional circuits in Tokyo, the Kansai region, and Nagoya, linked by periodicals, exhibitions, and study groups. Figures connected to these networks include the poet-photographer Kansuke Yamamoto and other participants in late-1930s Nagoya groups that developed at the intersection of photography and Surrealism.

== Scope and terminology ==
This article uses the umbrella term avant-garde photography in Japan for experimental photographic practices that developed within and alongside Japan's interwar "New Photography" milieu (shinkō shashin; 新興写真) and that later intersected with modernist and Surrealist ideas, as well as with wartime pressures on cultural expression. It is intended as a cross-regional and cross-media category (linking practices circulated through magazines, exhibitions, and groups), rather than as the name of any single organization.

=== Definition used in this article ===
In this article, "avant-garde photography in Japan" is used to connect (1) the broader modernist current commonly described as shinkō shashin ("new photography") and (2) the shorter late-1930s surge in which photographers and critics increasingly used explicit "avant-garde/vanguard" language (zen'ei; 前衛) and organized around research groups and associations.

=== Related terms and how this article treats them ===
Shinkō shashin ("new photography") is treated here as the broader interwar modernist milieu in which new techniques, aesthetic debates, and amateur networks expanded rapidly in the early 1930s.

The Japanese term zen'ei (literally "vanguard") carried political overtones in the 1930s, and sources distinguish between its use as a translation with proletarian associations and the loanword (avangyarudo) used more narrowly for artistic movements. In Japanese-language museum writing on the period, "avant-garde photography" (zen'ei shashin; 前衛写真) is also used for the late-1930s photography movement associated with groups such as the Avant-Garde Photography Association (前衛写真協会) and regional collectives including the Nagoya Photo Avant-Garde (ナゴヤ・フォトアヴァンギャルド).

Under wartime cultural controls, sources note that "avant-garde" language became difficult to use publicly; the word zen'ei itself was treated as prohibited in some contexts, and groups adopted alternative framings such as shashin zōkei (写真造形) and shashin bunka (写真文化).

=== Japanese scripts and romanization ===
Japanese names and terms are given in romanization, with Japanese-script forms (kanji/kana) provided at first mention where helpful for identification in Japanese-language sources and catalogues.

== Historical overview ==
=== Preconditions (to the 1920s) ===
By the late 1920s, the term shinkō (新興) (“new” or “progressive”) circulated widely in Japanese cultural discourse, alongside rapidly expanding urban modernity and new mass publics for magazines and visual culture. Within photography, this broader climate supported the emergence of shinkō shashin (新興写真) (“New Photography”) as a modernist break with earlier pictorialist conventions and as a set of practices debated across periodicals and local circles rather than through a single centralized institution.

=== The FiFo shock and consolidation of "New Photography" (1931–1933) ===
Japanese photo historiography often identifies the 1931 German International Touring Photography Exhibition (linked to Film und Foto) as a catalytic encounter that sharpened the sense of a “before/after” between “old” and “new” photography in Japan. In the early 1930s, Tokyo-based small-press initiatives such as the magazine Kōga (光画) (1932) helped articulate an anti-pictorialist stance in print and promoted modernist technique as a program of “return” to photography's specific properties. These debates contributed to a broad “New Photography” milieu that could travel across cities through publications and exhibitions even when particular circles and magazines were institutionally fragile or short-lived.

=== Differentiation inside shinkō shashin (mid-1930s) ===
By the mid-1930s, modernist photography in Japan diversified across multiple local circuits and purposes, including club-based experimentation and more applied directions that circulated through the same print and exhibition infrastructures. The 1990 Nagoya City Art Museum catalogue frames Kansai amateur camera clubs—such as Naniwa Photography Club (浪華写真倶楽部), Ashiya Camera Club (芦屋カメラクラブ), and Tanpei Photography Club (丹平写真倶楽部)—as an important base where “New Photography” developed toward more explicitly “avant-garde” orientations in the early 1930s.

=== Zen'ei moment and Surrealist alignment (1937–1940) ===
The same catalogue treats the 1937 touring exhibition Kaigai Chōgenjitsushugi Sakuhinten (海外超現実主義作品展) (“Exhibition of Overseas Surrealist Works”), shown in cities including Tokyo, Kyoto, Osaka and Nagoya, as a key turning point that divides the trajectory of Japan's prewar avant-garde photography into an earlier and later phase. In the late 1930s, zen'ei shashin (前衛写真) (“avant-garde photography”) became more visible as a self-description across multiple research-oriented groups, including formations such as the Nagoya Photo Avant-Garde (ナゴヤ・フォトアヴァンギャルド) in Nagoya and other contemporaneous circles elsewhere in Japan. In Nagoya, the catalogue links the formation of the Nagoya Photo Avant-Garde (1939) to earlier interdisciplinary contexts and notes its membership and activity as a study- and critique-oriented group that also circulated work via magazines such as Photo Times (フォトタイムス). The catalogue also identifies poet-photographer Kansuke Yamamoto among the participants in the Nagoya Photo Avant-Garde's circle during this period.

=== Wartime suppression and renaming (late 1939–early 1940s) ===
Under intensifying wartime cultural controls, the 1990 catalogue states that the term “zen'ei (前衛)” (“avant-garde”) was prohibited and that groups rebranded, with the Zen'ei Shashin Kyōkai (前衛写真協会) renamed Shashin Zōkei Kenkyūkai (写真造形研究会) and the Nagoya Photo Avant-Garde (ナゴヤ・フォトアヴァンギャルド) renamed Nagoya Shashin Bunka Kenkyūkai (名古屋写真文化研究会). In this framing, the late-1930s avant-garde surge is characterized as short-lived, with the broader movement declining as wartime conditions privileged “reportage photography” and documentary legibility over experimental positioning. Recent English-language scholarship similarly notes that, during the publication process of the Surrealist photography album Mesemu zoku (メセム属) (1940), the contextual term “avant-garde” was displaced by “plasticity” (zōkei (造形)) in response to political pressures. For Nagoya specifically, the 1990 catalogue reports that the Nagoya Photo Avant-Garde adopted the name “Nagoya Photography Culture Association” (Nagoya Shashin Bunka Kyōkai (名古屋写真文化協会)) around late 1939.

=== Postwar afterlives (mid-1940s onward) ===
In broader accounts of Japanese Surrealism and its visual arts, the 1930s are often discussed as forming an important link between prewar and postwar avant-gardes, even when overt “avant-garde” identification had been made difficult under wartime conditions. Stojkovic argues that Surrealist ideas remained central to postwar avant-garde art in Japan beyond the 1930s, extending beyond but also including photography. Within this longer arc, Yamamoto is described as resuming activities after the war and continuing to participate in later photographic circles. In Nagoya, an early postwar instance of such renewed activity was VIVI, founded in 1947 by Keiichirō Gotō and his collaborators; a Metropolitan Museum of Art collection note describes the group as reviving the city's avant-garde scene after wartime governmental censure of experimental practice. One postwar framework for such continued experimentation was the Japan Subjective Photography League, founded in May 1956, through which prewar avant-garde photographers including Kansuke Yamamoto, Keiichirō Gotō, and Kōrō Honjō were briefly regrouped alongside younger postwar figures such as Kiyoji Ōtsuji, Ikkō Narahara, and Yasuhiro Ishimoto in the First International Subjective Photography Exhibition later that year.

== Infrastructure and circulation ==
=== Magazines as platforms ===
Interwar and wartime photographic experimentation in Japan circulated primarily through magazines, which combined portfolios, technical guidance, and critical debate for a nationwide readership. Stojković notes that magazines such as Photo Times (フォトタイムス) played a central role in disseminating modernist approaches, including through recurring editorial features that foregrounded new practice and technique. In 1938, Photo Times devoted space to debate on “avant-garde photography” in a dedicated roundtable discussion, while critics such as Shūzō Takiguchi contributed essays on the topic in the same magazine. Museum-catalogue accounts of the Nagoya milieu note that members of the Nagoya Photo Avant-Garde (ナゴヤ・フォトアヴァンギャルド) appeared in Photo Times soon after the group's formation and were repeatedly introduced there in 1939–1940, illustrating how “regional” work could be positioned within a national photographic discourse.

=== Poetry and modernist journals as conduits ===
Exhibition catalogues on Japanese Surrealism also emphasize that ideas relevant to avant-garde photography circulated through modernist poetry publishing and translation activity, creating channels that ran alongside photography magazines. For Nagoya, the 1990 catalogue identifies the poetry journal Ciné (シネ) (1929–1930) as the city's first Surrealist magazine and treats later small-press activity as part of the local context in which Surrealist photography developed. The same catalogue describes the Surrealist poetry journal Yoru no Funsui (夜の噴水) as founded in 1938 and edited by Kansuke Yamamoto and Chirū Yamanaka, providing a point of contact between poetic Surrealism and photographic practice.

=== Exhibitions and touring shows ===
Touring exhibitions provided opportunities to encounter Surrealist imagery and objects beyond reproduced illustrations, and they created shared reference points that could be discussed across cities in print. The 1990 catalogue describes the touring Exhibition of Overseas Surrealist Works (Kaigai Chōgenjitsushugi Sakuhinten (海外超現実主義作品展), 1937) as including extensive photographic reproductions of Surrealist painting and sculpture, underscoring the role of mediated images in how Surrealism was studied and debated in Japan.

=== Clubs, study groups, and "amateur" infrastructure ===
Outside formal art academies, regular meetings, critiques, and study sessions in clubs and informal groups provided a practical infrastructure for making and evaluating experimental photographs. Writing on Nagoya's photographic history, Jō Takeba characterizes local modern photography movements—from early “art photography” through the prewar “photo avant-garde”—as arising from cycles of amateur group formation and dissolution, supported by a dense local base of studios and suppliers. Nagoya-specific catalogues further describe how poet–critics and photographers shared international reference points through discussion and editorial work; for example, a 1989 Nagoya City Art Museum catalogue notes Yamanaka's role in introducing Surrealist periodicals such as Minotaure and Cahiers d'Art to the group's discussions and publications.

== Practices and aesthetics ==
=== Techniques and procedures ===
Accounts of interwar Japanese "New Photography" emphasize darkroom- and magazine-mediated experimentation, including techniques such as photomontage and photograms (camera-less images made by placing objects directly on photosensitive paper). Stojkovic notes that these procedures were promoted to an expanding amateur readership through magazine columns and study-group activity, encouraging photographers to treat technique as a site of modernist inquiry rather than merely a means of reproduction. Within regional avant-garde circles, staged still lifes and montage-based constructions offered ways to shift photography away from straightforward depiction toward constructed images and conceptual juxtaposition.

=== Two aesthetic poles within Japanese avant-garde photography ===
Museum writing on the Nagoya milieu describes prewar "avant-garde photography" as taking forms associated with both Surrealism and abstraction, while also stressing that practitioners often pursued distinct aims rather than strict adherence to Surrealist orthodoxy. In Stojkovic's account, wartime pressures made "avant-garde" language difficult to sustain publicly; in the publication process of the Surrealist photography album Mesemu zoku (メセム属) (1940), "avant-garde" was displaced by "plasticity" (zōkei (造形)), a shift that indexed a re-framing of experimental photography under political constraint. The later album Zōkei shashin (造型写真) (1941) has been discussed as articulating a constructive "plasticity" orientation within avant-garde photography, emphasizing form, structure, and abstraction as a photographic problem rather than Surrealist narrative or symbolism.

=== "Objectivity" and social function as contested problems ===
A recurring issue in accounts of Japanese avant-garde photography is how photographers negotiated the medium's claims to mechanical "objectivity" while using procedures (montage, staging, constructed motifs) that foregrounded intervention and authorship. The 1989 Nagoya City Art Museum catalogue, for example, describes photographers who sought to exceed photography's inherent objectivity by constructing motifs through montage and, in some cases, by fabricating the motif itself before photographing it. The same catalogue frames the period as one in which practitioners pursued divergent solutions—ranging from direct depiction and disciplined "straight" approaches to poetry-and-photography experimentation (including the poet-photographer Kansuke Yamamoto)—and it notes that some figures redirected their concerns toward other photographic genres as wartime conditions intensified.

== Regional case studies ==
This section summarizes three regional circuits—Nagoya, Kansai, and Tokyo—that recur in scholarship on Japan's interwar and early wartime avant-garde photography as sites where practice and debate were organized through different institutional mixes (publishing, clubs, and exhibitions).

=== Nagoya: poetry-photography linkage and local publishing ===
Exhibition catalogues on Japanese Surrealism describe Nagoya as a site where modernist poetry publishing and translation activity provided an important conduit for Surrealist ideas alongside photographic practice. The 1990 catalogue identifies the poetry journal Ciné (シネ) (1929–1930) as Nagoya's first Surrealist magazine and describes Yoru no Funsui (夜の噴水) as founded in 1938 and edited by Kansuke Yamamoto and Chirū Yamanaka.

The same catalogue reports that the Nagoya Photo Avant-Garde (ナゴヤ・フォトアヴァンギャルド) formed in 1939 and that its members—including Yamamoto—circulated work and group activity through national photography magazines such as Photo Times (フォトタイムス). By the end of 1939, Yamamoto had left the Nagoya Photo Avant-Garde, which had changed its name to avoid attracting the attention of the Thought Police and had begun producing more propagandistic images. He remained active through Seidōsha, for which he produced the newsletter Carnet Bleu. For late-1930s Nagoya, Stojkovic discusses how wartime pressures affected public framing: during the publication process of the Surrealist photography album Mesemu zoku (メセム属) (1940), “avant-garde” language was displaced by “plasticity” (zōkei (造形)) as a contextual term. She also discusses the album Zōkei shashin (造型写真) (1941) as articulating a constructive “plasticity” orientation within this milieu, emphasizing form and abstraction as a photographic problem.

=== Kansai: club-based experimentation as an incubator ===
Stojkovic describes Kansai camera-club culture as an important base for sustained experimentation in the early 1930s, including photographers who participated in exhibitions and contributed to modernist photo magazines. In later discussions of “avant-garde photography” as a category, Kansai-linked networks appear as part of cross-city debate rather than as an isolated regional scene.

=== Tokyo: magazines and critics as organizing apparatus ===
Tokyo-based magazines and critics played an outsized role in defining vocabulary and mediating disputes about what “avant-garde photography” could mean under political pressure. For example, Photo Times (フォトタイムス) hosted a roundtable discussion on “avant-garde photography” in 1938, and critics such as Shūzō Takiguchi published essays addressing the topic in the same magazine. Stojkovic situates this magazine-centered discourse within a broader interwar photographic print culture in which techniques and concepts circulated nationally through periodicals and related networks.

== Major figures ==
This section lists selected figures frequently discussed in sources on interwar and early wartime Japanese avant-garde photography as organizers, critics, or participants in regional circuits; it is not a comprehensive roster of photographers active in the period.

- Kansuke Yamamoto is discussed as a poet-photographer in the Nagoya milieu who edited the Surrealist poetry journal Yoru no Funsui (夜の噴水) (founded 1938) and participated in late-1930s avant-garde photography networks in the city.
- Chirū Yamanaka is described in the Nagoya City Art Museum catalogue as a theoretical guide within the Nagoya Photo Avant-Garde circle who introduced international Surrealist materials (including periodicals such as Minotaure and Cahiers d'Art) and sought direct exchange abroad, including arranging publication of Tsugio Tajima's work in Minotaure.
- Shūzō Takiguchi appears in museum accounts as a major critic of Surrealism who co-planned the 1937 touring exhibition Kaigai Chōgenjitsushugi Sakuhinten (海外超現実主義作品展) with Yamanaka, a key encounter point for avant-garde circles across multiple cities.
- Yoshio Shimozato is noted in the same catalogue as an organizer and supporter of the 1937 Surrealist touring exhibition (as editor-in-chief of Shunchōkai (春鳥会)) and is treated in Nagoya-focused writing as a central participant in local Surrealist and avant-garde activity.
- Minoru Sakata is contrasted in the 1989 Nagoya City Art Museum catalogue with other Nagoya photographers as a figure who worked through Surrealist and abstract forms while remaining skeptical about “photo-surrealism” and later redirecting his interests toward vernacular/folk photography as a model for the medium.
- Tsugio Tajima is described in the same catalogue as pursuing a disciplined “straight” approach—photographing subjects directly and developing a restrained irony—within the broader field of Nagoya avant-garde practice.
- Keiichirō Gotō is discussed in the 1989 catalogue as working contemporaneously with (but not formally within) the Nagoya Photo Avant-Garde, constructing images through photomontage and later manipulating motifs more directly as a means of challenging photography's inherent objectivity; the catalogue also notes his early connection with Yamamoto in late-1930s Nagoya. Critics and editors associated with the interwar "New Photography" infrastructure—including figures such as photography critic Nobuo Ina and magazine editors linked to Photo Times (フォトタイムス)—are treated in English-language scholarship as key mediators who circulated terminology and technique to an expanding amateur public, providing conditions for later “avant-garde” debates.

== Reception and historiography ==
Accounts of Japan's interwar and early wartime avant-garde photography have often emphasized the instability of terminology and the difficulty of sustaining overt "avant-garde" positioning under increasing political scrutiny, while also reconstructing the period through regional networks and small-scale publishing rather than a single institutional center.

=== Contemporary framing (1930s–1940s) ===
Stojkovic notes that late-1930s discourse around zen'ei shashin ("avant-garde photography") included efforts to redefine the term in ways that reduced its earlier political charge, reflecting its sensitivity under surveillance conditions. In her account of the 1940 Surrealist photography album Mesemu zoku (メセム属), Stojkovic argues that the contextual term "avant-garde" was displaced by "plasticity" (zōkei (造形)) during publication as a response to political pressures on cultural expression. An essay in the 1990 Nagoya City Art Museum catalogue similarly frames wartime cultural and ideological controls as driving a shift away from "avant-garde" language toward labels such as "photography culture" and "plasticity", and it treats this terminological change as evidence of a constrained public space for experimental work.

=== Postwar reassessments and museum narratives ===
Nagoya City Art Museum catalogues have played an important role in consolidating a regional-network model for prewar avant-garde photography, presenting the Nagoya milieu through the interaction of poetry-led Surrealist publishing and photography groups such as the Nagoya Photo Avant-Garde (ナゴヤ・フォトアヴァンギャルド). A comparable regional framework was also adopted by the 2022 Tokyo Photographic Art Museum exhibition Avant-Garde Rising: The Photographic Vanguard in Modern Japan, which organized the subject through sections on Osaka, Nagoya, Fukuoka, and Tokyo. In these museum narratives, practitioners are described as adopting forms associated with Surrealism and abstraction while pursuing divergent aims within photography (including "straight" approaches, poetry-and-photography experimentation, and montage-based constructions).

Later local criticism and historiographic interventions have revisited Nagoya's photographic history as a long-running movement ecology, emphasizing the role of amateur groups and local infrastructures in generating both “art photography” and prewar avant-garde activity. In English-language scholarship, Stojkovic treats Surrealist photography as emerging through the infrastructures of shinkō shashin (新興写真) and later being reshaped by the constraints of the late 1930s and early 1940s, offering a synthesis that connects Tokyo- and Kansai-based print culture with Nagoya's interdisciplinary networks (including figures such as Kansuke Yamamoto).

== Legacy ==
Scholarship on Japan's interwar and early wartime avant-garde photography commonly emphasizes its procedural repertoire—especially the use of montage-based construction (including photomontage and photocollage), camera-less experimentation such as photograms, and staged object work—as a key part of what later accounts identify as modernist and Surrealist photographic practice in Japan. Within Nagoya-focused accounts, the wartime shift from "avant-garde" language toward "plasticity" (zōkei (造形)) is treated not only as a constraint on public description but also as a framing that shaped how abstraction and constructive form were discussed in photographic terms.

A second legacy is conceptual rather than stylistic: sources repeatedly frame the period as grappling with photography's claims to mechanical "objectivity" and with the question of how experimental work could be justified socially under escalating wartime controls. In Nagoya City Art Museum writing, photographers in the Nagoya Photo Avant-Garde (ナゴヤ・フォトアヴァンギャルド) milieu are described as pursuing divergent solutions—ranging from direct depiction and disciplined "straight" approaches to montage-led construction and poetry-and-photography experimentation (including the poet-photographer Kansuke Yamamoto)—rather than converging on a single Surrealist orthodoxy.

Institutionally, later histories often treat prewar photographic culture as a movement ecology sustained by magazines and amateur-group infrastructures, with regional circuits (including Nagoya) functioning as production and circulation nodes for modernist and avant-garde practice. Stojkovic further argues that Surrealist ideas remained central to postwar avant-garde art in Japan beyond the 1930s, providing one pathway through which prewar photographic experimentation continued to matter in later accounts of Japanese modernism.

== Appendices ==
=== Chronology table ===
Year(s)	Event	Notes
1929–1930	Ciné (シネ) is published in Nagoya and shifts into a Surrealism-oriented magazine.	The 1990 Nagoya City Art Museum catalogue treats Ciné as Nagoya's first Surrealist magazine and as part of a broader translation-and-publishing circuit.
1931	The Doitsu Kokusai Idō Shashin ten (ドイツ国際移動写真展) (German International Travelling Photography Exhibition), the photography component of Film und Foto, tours Japan (Tokyo and Osaka).	Stojkovic describes it as a major encounter that helped trigger a new approach to photographic practice in Japan and is frequently treated as a “before/after” marker in later accounts.
1932–1933	The Tokyo-based modernist photography magazine Kōga (光画) runs for 18 issues.	Stojkovic notes its role as a platform for articulating "new photography" and for circulating modernist technique and debate (including Ina Nobuo's manifesto-like “Return to Photography”).
1937	The touring exhibition Kaigai Chōgenjitsushugi Sakuhinten (海外超現実主義作品展) (Exhibition of Overseas Surrealist Works) is held in Tokyo and multiple regional cities.	The 1990 Nagoya City Art Museum catalogue describes the exhibition as including extensive photographic reproductions of Surrealist works and treats it as a major encounter point for Japanese Surrealism and related visual practices.
1938	Yoru no Funsui (夜の噴水) is founded in Nagoya and edited by Kansuke Yamamoto (with Yamanaka's cooperation).	The 1990 catalogue situates Yoru no funsui as a Surrealist poetry journal linked to the post-1937 exhibition context and to translation/introduction of Surrealist writing.
1939	The Nagoya Photo Avant-Garde (ナゴヤ・フォトアヴァンギャルド) forms in Nagoya.	The 1990 catalogue reports group formation and notes that members circulated activity via national photography magazines such as Photo Times (フォトタイムス).
Late 1939–early 1940s	"Avant-garde" (zen'ei (前衛)) terminology becomes difficult to use publicly and is displaced by alternative framings such as "photography culture" and "plasticity" (zōkei (造形)).	Stojkovic discusses the shift during the publication process of Mesemu zoku (メセム属), and the 1990 catalogue frames wartime controls as driving terminological substitution.
1940	The Surrealist photography album Mesemu zoku (メセム属) is published.	Stojkovic discusses the publication context, including the replacement of "avant-garde" by "plasticity" as a contextual label under political pressure.
1941	The album Zōkei shashin (造型写真) is published.	Stojkovic discusses it as articulating a constructive/"plasticity" orientation that emphasized form and abstraction as photographic problems.

=== Glossary ===
Shinkō shashin (新興写真)
A Japanese term usually translated as "New Photography", used for interwar modernist photography linked to urban modernity, magazine culture, and experiments in framing and technique; Stojkovic treats it as a key infrastructure within which later Surrealist/avant-garde photography emerged.
Zen'ei shashin (前衛写真)
"Avant-garde photography"; Stojkovic describes late-1930s debate around the term as sensitive under surveillance and as involving attempts to redefine its political charge.
Shashin zōkei (写真造形)
A "plasticity"/constructive-form framing used in wartime contexts; Stojkovic discusses “plasticity” (造形) as a substitute contextual label for experimental photography under political pressure.
Shashin bunka (写真文化)
"Photography culture"; the 1990 Nagoya City Art Museum catalogue treats “photography culture” language as part of wartime-era re-framing that displaced overt “avant-garde” terminology.

=== Network map ===
- Nagoya publishing circuit: Ciné (シネ) and Yoru no Funsui (夜の噴水) (edited by Yamamoto), treated as conduits for Surrealist translation and discourse in Nagoya.
- Nagoya group circuit: Nagoya Photo Avant-Garde (ナゴヤ・フォトアヴァンギャルド) (formed 1939), reported as circulating activity through national photography magazines such as Photo Times (フォトタイムス).
- Cross-city exhibition circuit: the 1937 touring Kaigai Chōgenjitsushugi Sakuhinten (海外超現実主義作品展), treated as a shared reference point for Surrealist-related visual culture across cities.
- Interwar magazine infrastructure: the post-1931 "New Photography" ecosystem described by Stojkovic, with magazines and amateur readerships supporting technique transfer and debate beyond a single center.

== See also ==
- Shinkō shashin
- Zen'ei shashin
- Photography in Japan
- Photography in Nagoya
- Surrealism in Japan
- Surrealist photography in Japan
- Nagoya Photo Avant-Garde
- Nagoya Avant-Garde Club
- VIVI
- Film und Foto
- Photomontage
- Photogram
- Kansuke Yamamoto (artist)
