= Shimonoseki City Art Museum =

Japanese museum

- 下関市立美術館
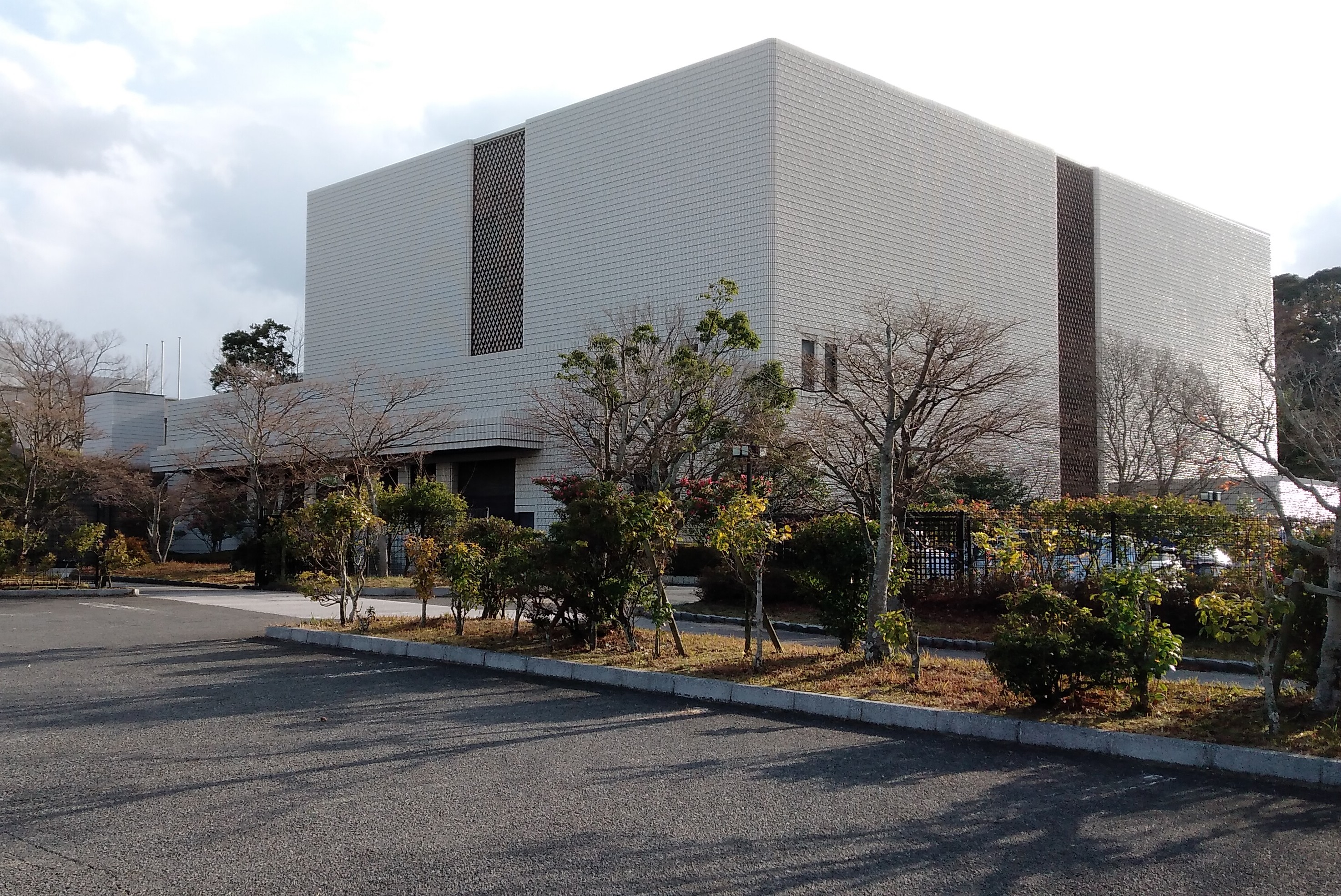
- Building of Shimonoseki City Art Museum

- Location within Yamaguchi Prefecture Location within Japan

General information
- Location: 1-1 Chōfukuromon Higashimachi, Shimonoseki, Yamaguchi Prefecture, Japan
- Coordinates: 33°59′23″N 130°59′27″E
- Opened: November 1983

Website
- Official website

Shimonoseki City Art Museum (下関市立美術館, Shimonoseki Shiritsu Bijutsukan) is a public museum that opened in Shimonoseki, Yamaguchi Prefecture, Japan, in 1983. The collection of some 2,200 items (as of April 2017, including items on deposit) includes works by Kanō Hōgai, Kishida Ryūsei, Matsumoto Shunsuke, Takashima Hokkai (高島北海), Oka Shikanosuke (岡鹿之助), and Kazuki Yasuo (香月泰男), as well as a New Kingdom Egyptian shawabti and Late Period image of Horus in the guise of a falcon.

== See also ==
- List of Cultural Properties of Japan - paintings (Yamaguchi)
- Yamaguchi Prefectural Museum of Art
- Shimonoseki City Archaeological Museum
- Shimonoseki City Museum of History
- Iwakuni Art Museum
