= Kikkawa Historical Museum =

Japanese museum

- 吉川史料館
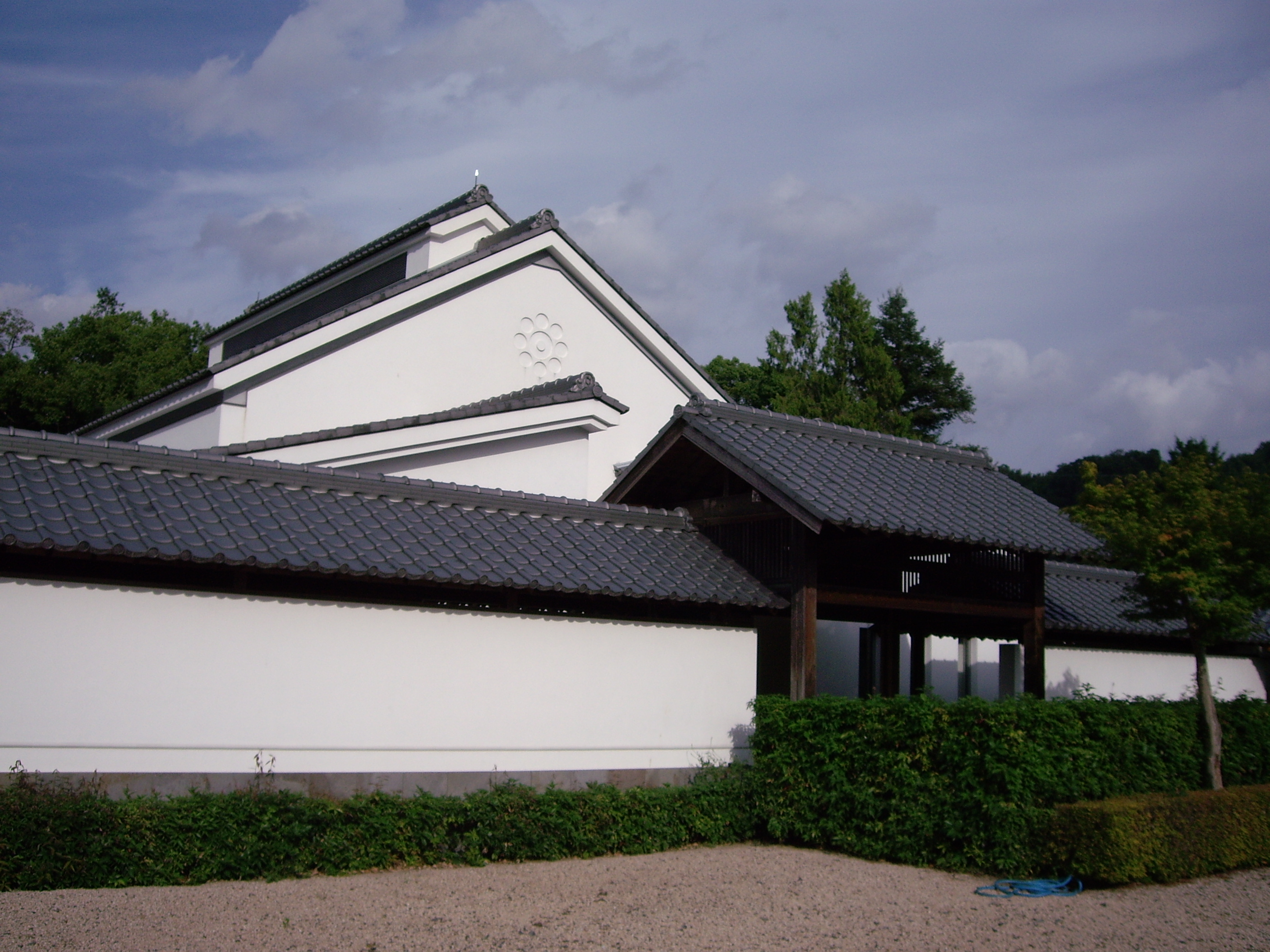

General information
- Location: 2-7-3 Yokoyama, Iwakuni, Yamaguchi Prefecture, Japan
- Coordinates: 34°10′14″N 132°10′40″E
- Opened: November 1995
- Cost: 0.0

Website
- Official website (ja)

Kikkawa Historical Museum (吉川史料館, Kikkawa Shiryōkan) is a private museum of artefacts handed down by the Kikkawa clan, daimyō of Iwakuni Domain, in Iwakuni, Yamaguchi Prefecture, Japan. Located between Kintai-kyō bridge and Iwakuni Castle and opened by the Kikkawa Hōkōkai Society (吉川報效会) in 1995, the museum's collection totals some seven thousand items, including materials from the Heian and Kamakura periods, a painting attributed to Sesshū, and one National Treasure. There are four changing displays each year. Other materials once owned by the Kikkawa clan are on display at Iwakuni Chōkokan.

== Highlights of the collection ==
- Sword known as Kitsunegasaki (狐ヶ崎), from the Kamakura period (National Treasure)
- Spring View from a Thatched Pavilion on the Lakeshore (紙本墨画淡彩湖亭春望図), traditionally attributed to Sesshū Tōyō; with an inscription (賛) by Tenyo Seikei (天与清啓), who journeyed twice on Japanese missions to Ming China, the second time with Sesshū accompanying (Prefectural Tangible Cultural Property)
- Kimono with a design of paths through the mountains, flowers, grasses, tortoises, and cranes (山道草花鶴亀文繡箔胴服), from the Momoyama period; said to have been bestowed upon Kikkawa Hiroie by Toyotomi Hideyoshi in 1587 after his campaign in Kyūshū (Important Cultural Property)
- Kikkawa Family Documents (吉川家文書): 102 items dating from the Kamakura to the Edo period (ICP); a further 32 items, plus a catalogue, from the Meiji period (Municipal Tangible Cultural Property)
- Azuma Kagami: 48 volumes, from the Muromachi period (1522) (ICP)
- Genkō Shakusho: 15 volumes, in the hand of Kikkawa Tsunemoto (吉川経基), from the Muromachi period (ICP)
- Taiheiki: 40 volumes, in the hand of Kikkawa Motoharu, from the Muromachi period (1563–65) (ICP)
- Lotus Sūtra in fine lettering, 8 scrolls: from the Heian period; formerly a temple treasure of Ninna-ji, later presented to Kikkawa Motonaga (吉川元長), as attested in the letter of transfer (ICP)
- Portrait of Kikkawa Motonaga (吉川元長)

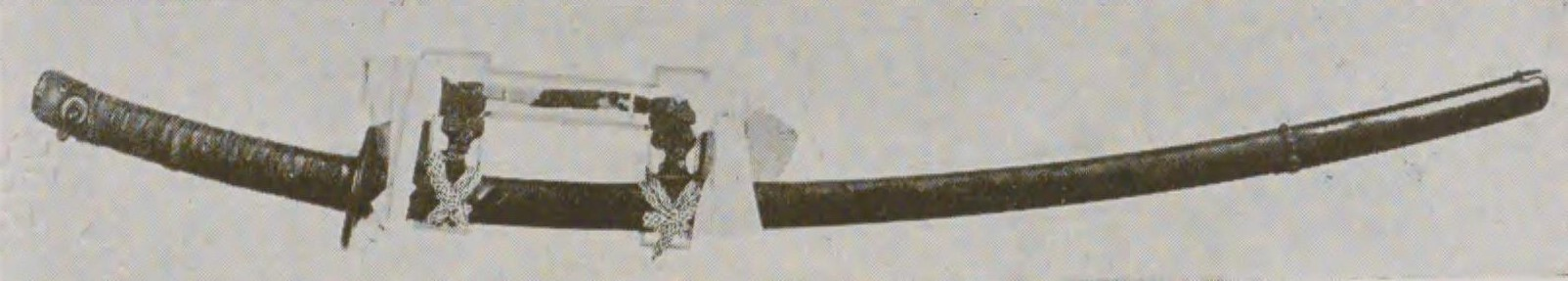
Kitsunegasaki (National Treasure)

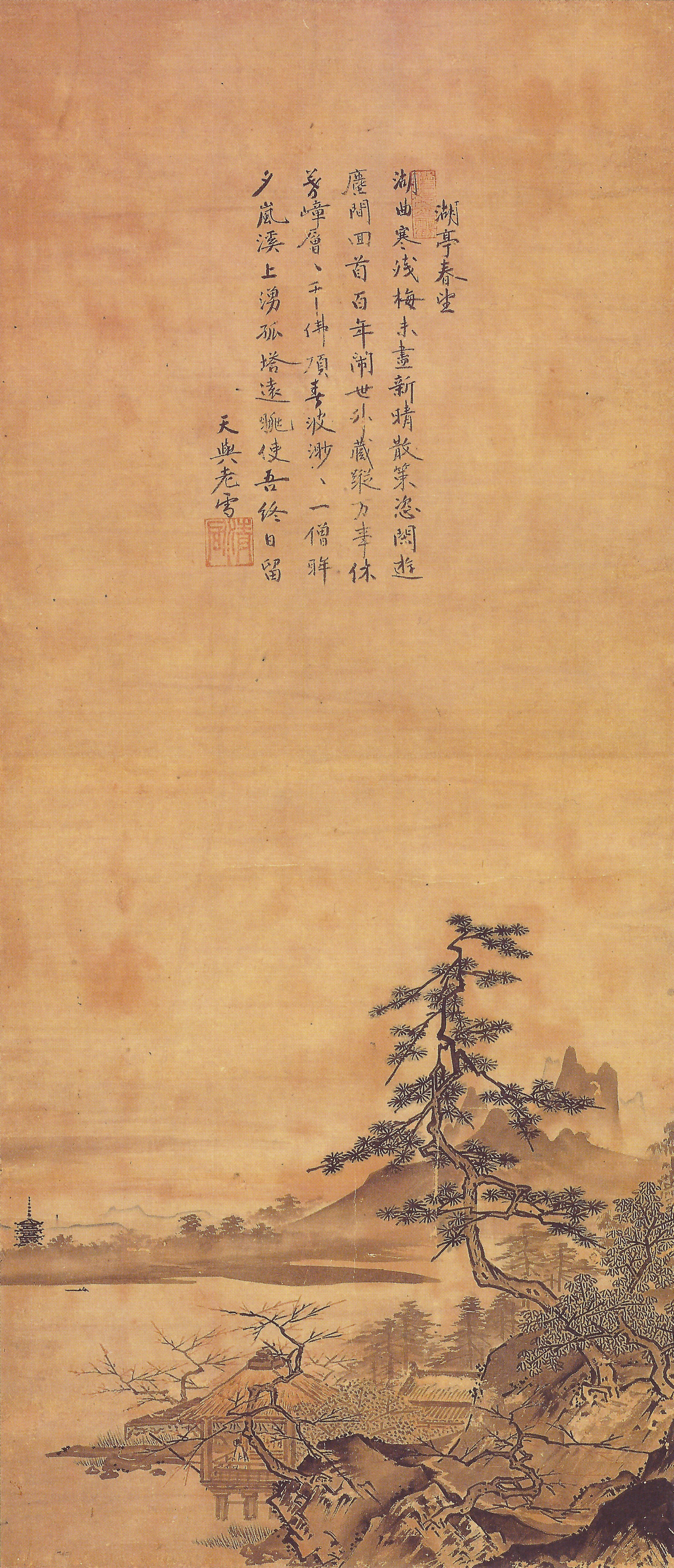
Spring View from a Thatched Pavilion on the Lakeshore, attributed to Sesshū

== See also ==
- List of National Treasures of Japan (crafts: swords)
- List of Cultural Properties of Japan - paintings (Yamaguchi)
- List of Historic Sites of Japan (Yamaguchi)
- Yamaguchi Prefectural Museum and Museum of Art
- Iwakuni Art Museum
- Mōri Museum
