= Iwakuni Chōkokan =

Japanese museum

- 岩国徴古館
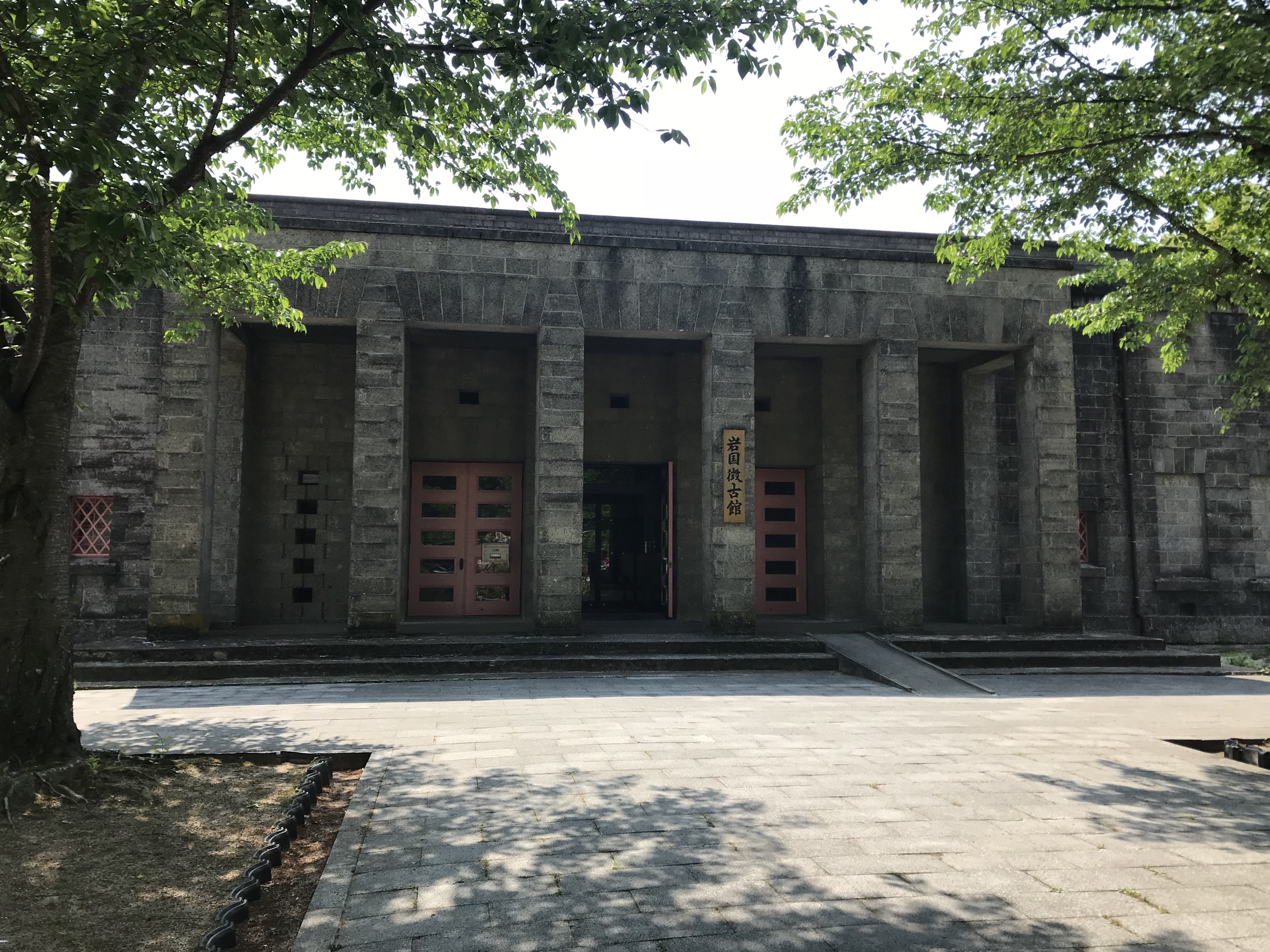

- Location within Yamaguchi Prefecture Location within Japan

General information
- Architectural style: German Neoclassicism (influenced by)
- Location: 2-7-19 Yokoyama, Iwakuni, Yamaguchi Prefecture, Japan
- Coordinates: 34°10′15″N 132°10′38″E
- Construction started: 1942
- Completed: March 1945
- Opened: April 1944

Design and construction
- Architect: Satō Takeo (佐藤武夫)

Website
- Official website (ja)

Iwakuni Chōkokan (岩国徴古館) is a public museum in Iwakuni, Yamaguchi Prefecture, Japan. Constructed between 1942 and March 1945 for the storage and display of the works of art and craft and historical materials donated by the Kikkawa family, former lords of Iwakuni Domain, the facility first opened in April 1944, operating fully as a museum from the beginning of the 1950s. The main building, by architect Satō Takeo (佐藤武夫), as well as storehouses built in 1891 and 1944, are registered Tangible Cultural Properties, while the ancillary building that was constructed in 1931 as the Kikkawa family office is a Prefectural Tangible Cultural Property.

The collection includes a painting by Bukō Kokushi (仏国国師) from the Kamakura period and the Ōuchi Edition Sanjūin, a pocket-sized printed version of Kokan Shiren's Shūbun Inryaku (聚分韻略) (a rhyming dictionary of Kanshi) issued by Ōuchi Yoshitaka in 1539, which are both Prefectural Tangible Cultural Properties.

== See also ==
- List of Cultural Properties of Japan - paintings (Yamaguchi)
- Yamaguchi Prefectural Museum and Museum of Art
- Iwakuni Castle, Kintai-kyō
- Kikkawa Historical Museum
- Iwakuni Art Museum
