= Shimonoseki City Museum of History =

Japanese museum

- 下関市立歴史博物館
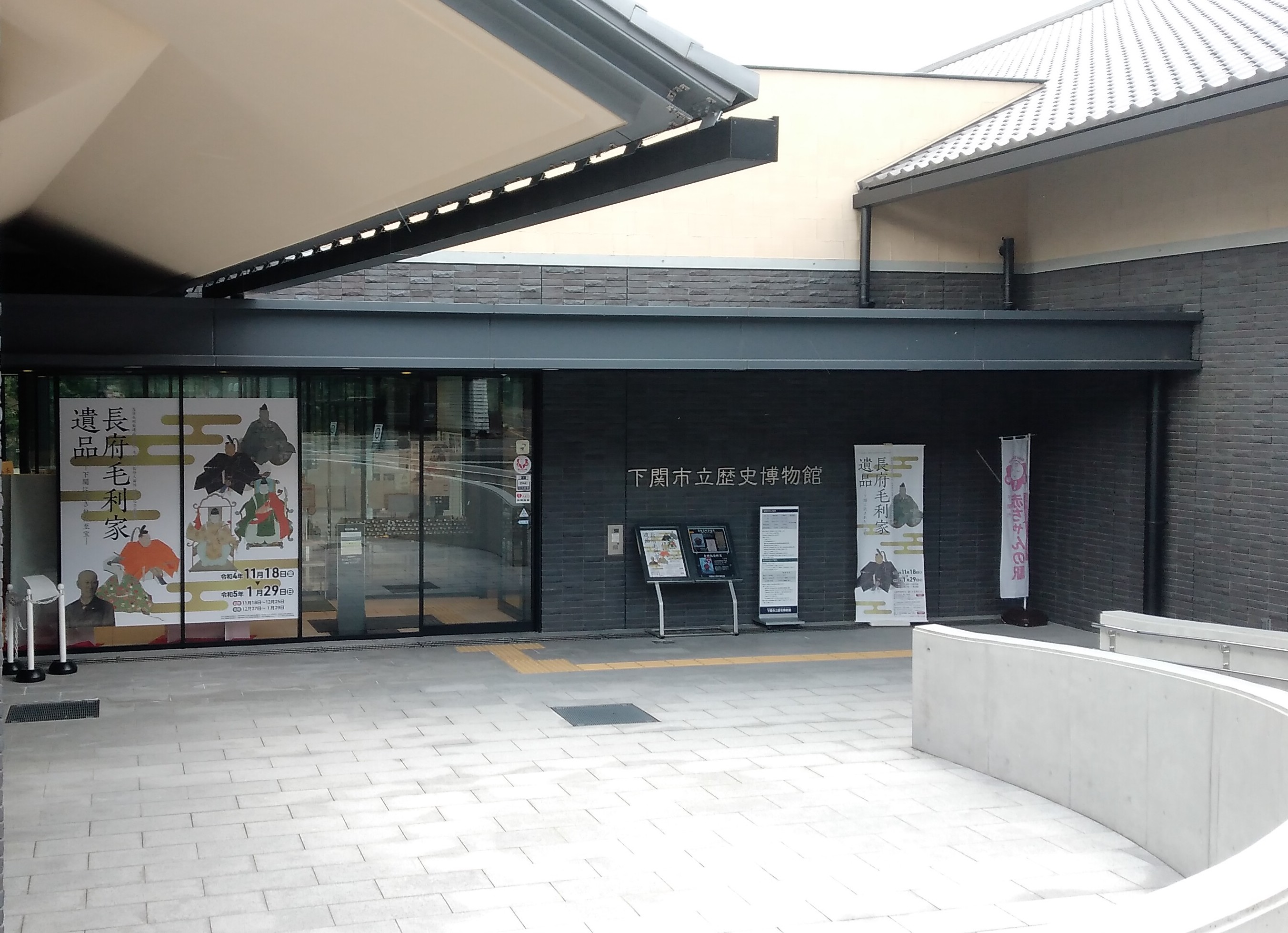
- Shimonoseki City Museum of History

- Location within Yamaguchi Prefecture Location within Japan

General information
- Location: 2-2-27 Chōfukawabata, Shimonoseki, Yamaguchi Prefecture, Japan
- Coordinates: 33°59′45″N 130°59′03″E
- Opened: 18 November 2016

Website
- Official website

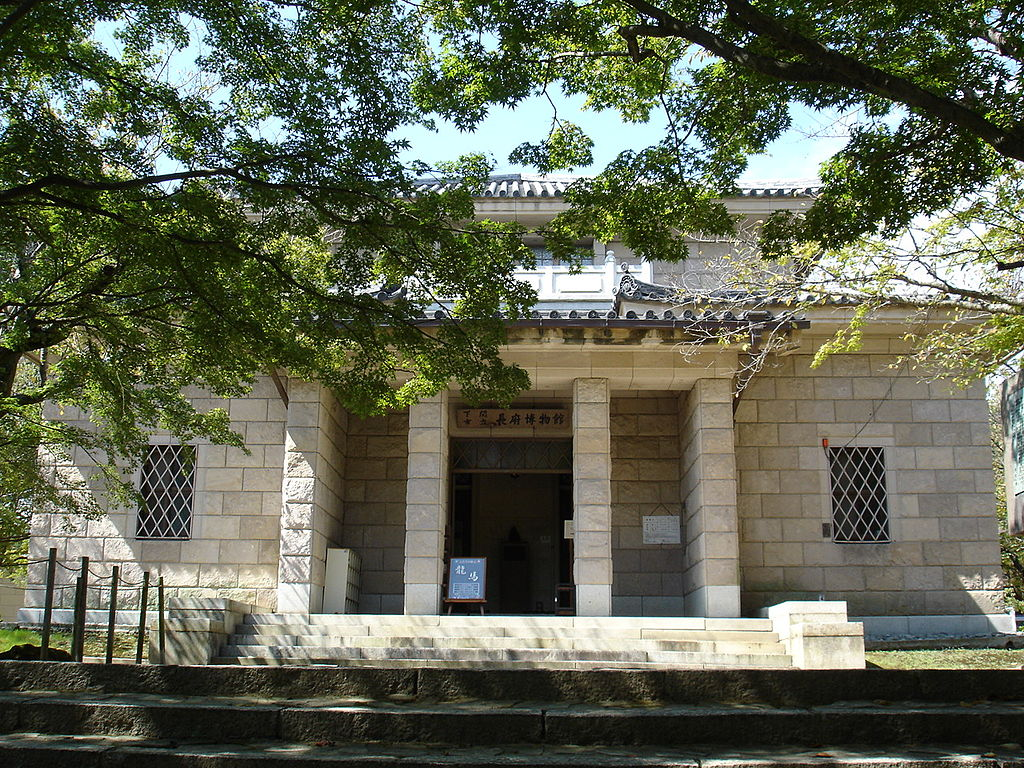
Former Shimonoseki City Chōfu Museum Main Building (1933) (Registered Tangible Cultural Property)

Shimonoseki City Museum of History (下関市立歴史博物館, Shimonoseki Shiritsu Rekishi Hakubutsukan) is a public museum that opened in Shimonoseki, Yamaguchi Prefecture, Japan, in 2016.

== History ==
In 1933 the Former Nagato Sonjōdō (旧長門尊攘堂), inspired by the Sonjōdō (尊攘堂) in Kyōto, was completed in the grounds of Kōzan-ji, in reinforced concrete dressed with stone and with a double tile roof reminiscent of the nearby temple hall; the twentieth-century building is now a registered Tangible Cultural Property. This subsequently became the private Chōfu Museum (長府博物館), then from 1 April 1980, with the donation of both the facilities and the collection, the Shimonoseki City Chōfu Museum (下関市立長府博物館), before reopening nearby in new buildings in 2016 under its current name.

== Collection ==
The collection focuses on the history and folkways of Shimonoseki and its environs, and includes the Kofun period Prefectural Tangible Cultural Property Excavated Artefacts from Shinkōji Kofun, Nara period Important Cultural Property Nagato Province Coin Remains, roof tiles from Nagato Kokubun-ji, the Takehisa Family Documents (武久家文書) and Ōuchi clan administrative documents known as Ōuchi Kabegaki (大内家壁書), both Prefectural Tangible Cultural Properties, and materials relating to the Joseon missions to Japan, Tagami Kikusha, Sakamoto Ryōma, Takasugi Shinsaku, the Kiheitai, and the Shimonoseki campaign and Chōshū expeditions.

== See also ==
- List of Historic Sites of Japan (Yamaguchi)
- Yamaguchi Prefectural Museum
- Shimonoseki City Archaeological Museum
- Shimonoseki City Art Museum
