= Takeji Iwamiya =

Japanese photographer

- Born: January 4, 1920. Yonago, Tottori
- Died: June 26, 1989 (aged 69)
- Occupation: Photographer
- Known for: His depiction of architecture, gardens, and Japanese crafts

Takeji Iwamiya (岩宮 武二, Iwamiya Takeji; 1920–1989) was a Japanese photographer particularly known for his depiction of architecture, gardens, and Japanese crafts.

== Career ==
Iwamiya was born on 4 January 1920 in Yonago, Tottori, the second son of parents running a shop selling traditional confectionery. An uncle of his ran a commercial photography studio, and this triggered the boy's interest in photography; but as a high school student he was keenest on baseball. After graduation from high school he worked Hankyu Department Store in Umeda (Osaka), where he entered the Mitsuwa photography club (ミツワ写真クラブ, Mitsuya shashin kurabu), led by Bizan Ueda and Nakaji Yasui. Following success in a photographic contest arranged by Asahi Shinbun, Iwamiya was invited to join the Tampei Photography Club and went on to become an assistant of Yasui's. He joined the Nankai Hawks in 1939 but left after half a year and in 1941 was sent to Manchukuo as a photographer.

Iwamiya returned to [mainland] Japan before the end of the war, and after the war opened a photofinishing shop serving a US base at Sannomiya (Kobe). While recuperating from tuberculosis in 1954, he photographed a mannequin factory nearby in Osaka; these photographs won the gold medal in the second Fuji Photo Contest, and were exhibited in the Matsushima Gallery (松島ギャラリー, Matsushima gyararī) in Ginza (Tokyo), as Iwamiya's first solo show. He also exhibited in West Germany, and at around this time got to know Ken Domon, who exerted a great influence on him. In 1955 he set up Iwamiya Photos (岩宮フォトス, Iwamiya fotosu) for commercial photography. Iwamiya's photographs of Sado island were exhibited at the Osaka Fuji Photo Salon and elsewhere in 1956; these would later appear in book form. In 1957, Iwamiya was also among the photographers included in Bessatsu Atorie Atarashii Shashin, a special issue that Ryūichi Kaneko later described as a printed forum in which prewar avant-garde figures such as Kansuke Yamamoto intersected with a younger generation of postwar photographers, including Kiyoji Ōtsuji, Ikkō Narahara, Hisae Imai, and Yasuhiro Ishimoto.

Two of Iwamiya's apprentices went on to be famous photographers in their own right. Seiryū Inoue joined Iwamiya's studio in 1951 and was encouraged by Iwamiya in his photographic work in Kamagasaki. Daidō Moriyama joined Iwamiya's studio in 1959 and was taken under Inoue's wing until Moriyama's departure for Tokyo in 1961.

From 1962, Iwamiya brought out a considerable number of books, mostly depicting Japanese crafts and architecture; several won awards. In 1966 he became a professor of Osaka University of Arts.

Iwamiya died in Osaka on 26 June 1989.

== Exhibitions ==
=== Solo exhibitions ===
- "Iwamiya Takeji-ten" (岩宮武二展). Fuji Photo Salon (Osaka), Matsushima Gallery (松島ギャラリー, Matsushima gyararī, Tokyo), 1955.
- "Sado" (佐渡). Fuji Photo Salon (Osaka), Matsushima Gallery (Tokyo), 1956. (Photographs of Sado island)
- "Hawai" (ハワイ). Takashimaya (Osaka), Fuji Photo Salon (Tokyo), 1960. (Photographs of Hawai'i)
- "Katachi" (かたち). Takashimaya (Osaka), Fuji Photo Salon (Tokyo), 1963.
- "Ankōru Watto" (アンコールワット). Ginza Nikon Salon (Tokyo), 1964. (Photographs of Angkor Wat)
- "Kyūtei no niwa" (宮廷の庭). Sogo (Kobe), 1968.
- "Expo '70 Iwamiya Takeji shashin-ten" (Expo'70岩宮武二写真展). Hanshin (Osaka), 1970.
- "Foto irasutorēshon arufoto" (フォトイラストレーション（アルフォト）). Imahashi Garō (今橋画廊, Osaka), Art Gallery U (Tokyo), 1970.
- [Title unknown]. Honolulu, 1970.
- "Sumi to sue to watakushi to" (墨と陶と私と). Pentax Gallery (Tokyo), 1974.
- "Butsuzō no imēji" (仏像のイメージ). Takashimaya (Kyoto), Sogo (Hiroshima) 1976.
- "Mita, totta" (見た・撮った). Naniwa Photopia Gallery (ナニワフォトピアギャラリー, Naniwa fotopia gyararī, Osaka), 1974.
- "Mita, totta" (見た・撮った). Nikon Salon (Tokyo and Osaka), 1975. (Photographs of Spain and Portugal)
- (陶板). Imai Gallery (Osaka), 1975.
- "Hyōkai" (氷海). Shinsaibashi Gallery (Osaka), 1975. (Oil paintings)
- "Iwamiya Takeji shashin-ten" (岩宮武二写真展). Fuji Photo Salon (Tokyo), 1976.
- "Butsuzō no imēji" (仏像のイメージ). Takashimaya (Kyoto), Sogo (Hiroshima) 1976.
- "Sumi to watakushi to" (墨と私と). Shinsaibashi Gallery (Osaka), 1977.
- "Kyō no katachi" (京のかたち). Asahi Kaikan (Kyoto), 1976.
- "Iwamiya Takeji shashin-ten" (岩宮武二写真展). Asahi Kaikan (Kyoto and Tokushima), 1976.
- "Serigurafī to Tapistorī" (タピストリーとセリグラフィー). Shinsaibashi Gallery (Osaka), 1977.
- "Shirukusukurīn ni yoru 'mado'" (シルクスクリーンによる「窓」). Shinsaibashi Gallery (Osaka and Tottori), 1977.
- "Works from 30 years". Fuji Photo Salon (Tokyo and Osaka), Wakita Gallery (Nagoya), Tokushima Arts Foundation for Culture (Tokushima), Daimaru (Tottori), Imai Gallery (Yonago), 1977.
- "Sumi to serigurafi" (墨とセリグラフィ). Iida Garō Bekkan (飯田画廊別館. Tokyo), 1977.
- "Serigurafu-ten" (セリグラフ展). Mingei Garō (民芸画廊, Kurayoshi), Imai Gallery (Yonago), 1978.
- "Nepāru no katachi" (ネパールの貌). Fuji Photo Salon (Osaka), Shinjuku Minolta Photo Space (Tokyo), Kathmandu, 1979.
- "Indo ni okeru butsuzō, shinzō, megamizō" (インドにおける佛像・神像・女神像). Ban Garow (番画廊, Ban garō, Osaka), 1980.
- "Mucho Sol: Taiyō ga ippai" (Mucho sol 太陽がいっぱい). Canon Salon (Tokyo, Osaka, and Nagoya), 1980.
- "Suiboku-ga to insatsu inku" (水墨＋印刷インク). Nakamura Garō (中村画廊, Osaka), 1981.
- "Sobyō" (素描). Shinsaibashi Gallery (Osaka), 1981.
- "Iwamiya Takeji-ten" (岩宮武二展). Shinjuku Olympus Gallery (Tokyo), Naniwa Photopia Gallery (ナニワフォトピアギャラリー, Naniwa fotopia gyararī, Osaka), 1981.
- "Iwamiya Takeji no me: 35-nen no kiseki-ten" (岩宮武二の眼 35年の軌跡展). Minolta Photo Space (Osaka), 1981.
- "Butsuzō no imēji" (仏像のイメージ) Nagase Photo Salon (Tokyo), 1981.
- "Iwamiya Takeji-ten" (岩宮武二展). Professional Space, 1982.
- "Fotorama no tabi: Indo, Nepāru" (フォトラマの旅 インド・ネパール). Fuji Photo Salon (Osaka), 1982.
- "Yōroppa no hikari to kage" (ヨーロッパの光と影). Minolta Photo Space (Tokyo), 1982.
- "Iwamiya Takeji-ten" (岩宮武二展). Olympus Gallery (Tokyo), 1982.
- "Kioku: Yōroppa kikō" (記憶 ヨーロッパ紀行). Minolta Photo Space (Tokyo, Osaka and Fukuoka), 1982–83.
- "Butsuzō no imēji" (仏像のイメージ) Osaka, 1982.
- "Sho, __ sobyō" (書・墨象・素描). Shinjuku Olympus Gallery (Tokyo), 1982.
- "Mitsu no mezotto ni yoru onna shirīzu" (3つのメゾットによる女シリーズ). Chaya Garō (茶屋画廊. Osaka), 1984.
- "Ankōru" (アンコール). Ginza Wako Hall (Tokyo), Keihan Gallery of Arts and Science (Osaka), 1987.
- "Abstraction". Kodak Photo Salon (Tokyo and Osaka), 1987.
- "The Image of the Buddha". Bijutsu Gyararī Itami (美術ギャラリー伊丹, Itami), 1987.
- "Portrait". Pentax Forum (Tokyo and Osaka), 1989.
- "Ima ni ikiru" (今に生きる). Navio Art Museum (Hankyu, Osaka), 1989.
- "Iwamiya Takeji-ten" (岩宮武二展). Yonago City Museum of Art (Yonago), 1990.
- "Yomigaeru Borobudūru" (甦えるボロブドゥール). Nikon Salon (Tokyo and Osaka), 1990.
- "Ima ni ikiru" (今に生きる). Fuji Photo Salon (Tokyo and Osaka), 1990.
- "Iwamiya Takeji-ten" (岩宮武二展). Brain Center Gallery (プレーンセンターギャラリー, Burēn sentā gyararī), 1996.
- "Iwamiya Takeji sakuhin-ten: Sengo kara 1970 nendai made no sakka katsudō" (岩宮武二作品展 戦後から1970年代までの作家活動). JCII Photo Salon (Tokyo), 1996.
- "Iwamiya Takeji: Kekkai no bi" (岩宮武二作品展 結界の美). Photo Art Gallery, Canon Sales Makuhari head office building (キャノン販売幕張本社ビル フォトアートギャラリー, Kyanon hanbai Makuhari honsha biru Fotoāto gyararī, Chiba), 1996.
- "Iwamiya Takeji no shashin sekai 1946–1975: Works from 30 years" (岩宮武二の写真世界 1946～1975 Works from 30 Years). Osaka Contemporary Art Center (Osaka), 2001.
- "Iwamiya Takeji: Ima ni ikiru" (岩宮武二・今に生きる). Museum of Arts and Crafts, Itami (Itami), 2001.
- "Iwamiya Takeji no shashin sekai / Ima ni ikiru" (岩宮武二の写真世界/今に生きる). Osaka Contemporary Art Center (Osaka), 2001.
- "Takeji Iwamiya: Photo and Drawing Exhibition". Osaka Contemporary Art Center (Osaka), January–February 2007.

=== Selection of other exhibitions ===
- "Tōkyō dai-ikkai demokurāto bijutsuten" (東京第一回デモクラート美術展). Matsushima Gallery (松島ギャラリー, Matsushima gyararī, Tokyo), 1952.
- Tanpei 8-nin shashinten" (丹平8人写真展). Tokyo, 1952. (Work by eight members of the Tampei Photography Club)
- "Subjektive Fotografie 2". Saarbrücken, 1954–55.
- "Iwamiya Takeji Horiuchi Hatsutarō-ten" (岩宮武二・堀内初太郎二人展). Fuji Film Gallery (Tokyo), 1955. Work by Iwamiya and Hatsutarō Horiuchi)
- "Rokunin-ten / Akiyama Shōtarō, Hayashi Tadahiko, Horiuchi Hatsutarō, Ueda Shōji, Midorikawa Yōichi, Iwamiya Takeji" (六人展/秋山庄太郎・林忠彦・堀内初太郎・植田正治・緑川洋一・岩宮武二). Fuji Film Gallery (Tokyo), 1959. (Work by Shōtarō Akiyama, Tadahiko Hayashi, Hatsutarō Horiuchi, Shōji Ueda, and Yōichi Midorikawa)
- "Sannin-ten / Akiyama Shōtarō, Nakamura Masaya, Iwamiya Takeji" (三人展/秋山庄太郎・中村正也・岩宮武二). Pentax Gallery (Tokyo), 1969 and annually thereafter. (Work by Shōtarō Akiyama, Masaya Nakamura, and Iwamiya)
- "Ei-Q to Demokurāto-ten" (瑛九とデモクラート展). Umeda Kindai Bijutsukan (梅田近代美術館), 1974. (On Ei-Q and the "Democrat" group)
- "Butsuzō no imēji-ten" (仏像のイメージ展). Ginza Wako Hall (Tokyo), Amagasaki Cultural Center (Amagasaki), museum of Hongik University (Seoul), 1975.
- "Sengo shashin / Saisei to tenkai" (戦後写真・再生と展開) / Twelve Photographers in Japan, 1945–55. Yamaguchi Prefectural Museum of Art (Yamaguchi), 1990.
- "Ueda Shōji to sono nakama-tachi: 1935–55" (植田正治とその仲間たち展). Yonago City Museum of Art (Yonago), 1992. (Exhibition of works by Shōji Ueda and his friends)
- "Maeda Tōshirō, Itō Tsugurō, Iwamiya Takeji" (前田藤四郎・伊藤継郎・岩宮武二. Osaka Contemporary Art Center, March–April 2008. An exhibition of Tōshirō Maeda, Tsugurō Itō, and Iwamiya.

== Works in permanent collections ==
Works by Iwamiya are in the permanent collections of the following institutions:

- Canon Marketing Japan; 30 works acquired in the 1990s
- Osaka University of Arts; 735 works acquired in the 1990s
- Osaka Contemporary Art Center (Osaka)
- Tokyo Metropolitan Museum of Photography; 30 works acquired in the 1990s
- Yamaguchi Prefectural Museum of Art (Yamaguchi City); 12 works acquired in the 1990s
- Yonago City Museum of Art; 735 works acquired in the 1990s

== Books showing Iwamiya's works ==
- Sadogashima (佐渡ヶ島) / Sado Island. Kadokawa Shashin Bunko 34. Tokyo: Kadokawa Shoten, 1956. Black-and-white photographs of Sado island. (in Japanese) Captions and text in Japanese only (despite the color photographs and English title on the cover).
- Nikkō (日光). Nihon no yashiro (日本のやしろ). Tokyo: Bijutsu Shuppansha, 1962. Photographs of Nikkō. Text by Ichirō Hariu (針生一郎) and Toshio Fukuyama (福山敏男). (in Japanese)
- Katachi: Nihon no denshō (かたち 日本の伝承). Tokyo: Bijutsu Shuppansha, 1962. Two volumes. Text by Shūji Takashina (高階秀爾). (in Japanese)
  - 1. Ki kami tsuchi (木・紙・土)
  - 2. Ishi kane suji take (石・金・織・竹)
- Sado (佐渡). Tokyo: Asahi Shinbunsha, 1962. Photographs of Sado island. (in Japanese)
- Katachi: Japanese Pattern and Design in Wood, Paper, and Clay. New York: Abrams, 1963. London, Weidenfeld & Nicolson, 1964. Text by Donald Richie. (in English)
- Design and Craftsmanship of Japan: Stone, Metal, Fibers and Fabrics, Bamboo. Tokyo: Bijutsu Shuppansha, 1963. New York: Abrams, 1965.
- Le Japon des formes: Bois, papier, argile. Tokyo: Bijutsu Shuppansha; Fribourg: Office du Livre; Paris: Société Française du Livre, 1963. Text by Atsuko N. Nii and Donald Richie, translation by Edith Combe. (in French)
- Forme giapponesi. Milano, Silvana editoriale d'arte, 1963. Text by Atsuko N. Nii and Donald Richie. (in Italian)
- Tōshōgū (東照宮). Tokyo: Bijutsu Shuppansha, 1963. Photographs of Tōshō-gū. Text by Isamu Kurita (栗田勇) and Kiyofumi Yajima (矢島清文). (in Japanese)
- Japon, beauté des formes: Pierre, métal, fibres, bambou. Tokyo, Bijutsu Shuppansha, 1964. (in French)
- Die Schönheit japanischer Formen: Stein, Metall, Textilien, Stroh, Bambus. Tokyo, Bijutsu Shuppansha, 1964. (in German)
- Itsukushima (厳島). Nihon no yashiro (日本のやしろ). Tokyo: Bijutsu Shuppansha, 1964. Photographs of Itsukushima. Text by Masatake Uwayokote (上横手雅敬) and Toshio Fukuyama. (in Japanese)
- Nihon no shi (日本の詩) Tokyo: Bijutsu Shuppansha, 1965.
- Nihon no yashiro (日本のやしろ). Tokyo: Bijutsu Shuppansha, 1965. (in Japanese)
- Impressions of Japan. Tokyo: Bijutsu Shuppansha, 1965.
- Kyō (京) / Kyoto in Kyoto. Kyoto: Tankō Shinsha, 1965. Photographs of Kyoto. Text by Jirō Osaragi. (in Japanese)
- Ishi no tera (石の寺). Kyoto: Tankō Shinsha, 1965. Text by Isamu Kurita. (in Japanese)
- Yamato no sekibutsu (大和の石仏). Kyoto: Tankō Shinsha, 1965. Text by Tatsuko Hoshino. (in Japanese)
- Kekkai no bi: Koto no dezain (結界の美 古都のデザイン). Kyoto: Tankō Shinsha, 1966. Text by Teiji Itō (伊藤ていじ). (in Japanese)
- Ryūkyū (琉球). Nihon no kōgei (日本の工芸). Tokyo: Tankōsha, 1966. Photographs of the Ryūkyū islands. Text by Seikō Hokama (外間正幸). (in Japanese)
- Kamera kikō: Ryūkyū no shinwa (カメラ紀行 琉球の神話). Tokyo: Tankōsha, 1966. Photographs of the Ryūkyū islands. Text by Torigoe Kenzaburō (鳥越憲三郎). (in Japanese)
- Tōka no bi: Koto no dezain (灯火の美 古都のデザイン). Kyoto: Tankō Shinsha, 1967. Photographs of lanterns. Text by Teiji Itō. (in Japanese)
- The World of the Japanese Garden: From Chinese Origins to Modern Landscape Art. New York: Weatherhill, 1968.
- Kyōto no niwa: Karā (京都の庭 カラー). Kyoto: Tankō Shinsha, 1968. Photographs of the gardens of Kyoto. Text by Michio Takeyama (竹山道雄). (in Japanese)
- Kyūtei no niwa (宮廷の庭). Kyoto: Tankō Shinsha, 1968. Photographs of Japanese palace gardens. (in Japanese)
  - 1. Sentō Gosho (仙洞御所). Photographs of Sentō Imperial Palace. Text by Yukio Mishima and Teiji Itō.
  - 2. Katsura Rikyū (桂離宮). Photographs of Katsura Detached Palace. Text by Yasushi Inoue and Teiji Itō.
  - 3. Shugakuin Rikyū (修學院離宮). Photographs of Shugakuin Detached Palace. Text by Jirō Osaragi and Teiji Itō.
- Arte del objeto japonés / Art of the Japanese Object / Art de l'objet japonais / Kunst des japanischen Gegenstands. Text by Maria Lluïsa Borràs. Barcelona: Ediciones Polígrafa, 1969. (in Spanish, English, and French) (in German)
- Nihon Bankokuhaku no kenchiku (日本万国博の建築) / The Edifice in Expo 70. Tokyo: Asahi Shinbunsha, 1970. Photography by Iwamiya, Yasuhiro Ishimoto, and Shōzō Kitadai of the buildings of Expo 70 (Osaka). (in Japanese) (in English)
- Imperial Gardens of Japan: Sento Gosho, Katsura, Shugaku-in. New York: Weatherhill, 1970. ISBN 0-8027-2436-1. 1978. ISBN 0-8348-1507-9, ISBN 0-8027-2436-1. Text by Teiji Itoh, Yukio Mishima, Yasushi Inoue, Jirō Osaragi, and Loraine Kuck. (in English)
- Shinpen Kyūtei no niwa 2 (新編宮廷の庭). Kyoto: Tankōsha, 1971. (in Japanese)
- Kyōto (京都). Tokyo: Mainichi Shinbunsha, 1971.
- The Japanese Garden: An Approach to Nature. New Haven: Yale University Press, 1972. ISBN 0-300-01601-8. Text by Teiji Ito, translation by Donald Richie. (in English)
- Kyōto no miryoku. Karā: Rakuchū (京都の魅力 カラー 洛中). Kyoto: Tankōsha, 1972. Photographs of Kyoto. Text by Naokatsu Nakamura (中村直勝). (in Japanese)
- Nihon no niwa (日本の庭). Tokyo: Chūōkōronsha, 1972. Text by Itō Teiji and Yūsaku Kamekura (亀倉雄策). (in Japanese)
- Nihonkai (日本海). Kyoto: Tankōsha, 1972. Photographs of the Japan Sea. Text by Tsutomu Minakami. (in Japanese)
- Nihon no kokoro: Hyakunin isshu (日本のこころ 百人一首). Special Winter 1972 issue of Taiyō (太陽). Tokyo: Heibonsha, 1973. Much of the photography, of hyakunin isshu, is by Iwamiya. (in Japanese)
- The Graphic Design of Yusaku Kamekura. New York: Weatherhill, 1973. Text by Herbert Bayer, Masaru Katsumi, and Yusaku Kamekura. (in English)
- Ōsaka (大阪). Osaka: Toppan Sēruzu, 1973. Photographs of Osaka. Text by Takeshi Ōtaka (大高猛). (in Japanese and English)
- Tōrō (燈籠). Tokyo: Shūeisha, 1973. Photographs of garden lanterns. Text by Masatarō Kawakatsu (川勝政太郎). (in Japanese)
- Shiragi no sekibutsu (新羅の石仏). Tokyo: Asahi Shinbunsha, 1974. Photographs, by Iwamiya and 崔元伍, of stone Buddhist statuary of Silla. Text by 黄寿永. (in Japanese)
- Nihon no teien (日本の庭園). Tokyo: Shūeisha, 1974. Photographs of Japanese gardens. Text by Osamu Mori (森蘊). (in Japanese)
- Nihon no senshoku (日本の染織). Tokyo: Mainichi Shinbunsha, 1975. Photographs of Japanese dyed and woven materials. Text by Tomoyuki Yamanobe (山辺知行). (in Japanese)
- Butsuzō no imēji: Shashinten (仏像のイメージ 写真展). Osaka: Osaka University of Arts, 1975. Catalogue of an exhibition of photographs of Buddhist statuary. (in Japanese)
- Iwamiya Takeji shashinshū (岩宮武二写真集) / Takeji Iwamiya Works from 30 Years. Tokyo: Nihon Shashin Kikaku, 1976. A retrospective of Iwamiya's work. (in Japanese)
- Kyō no niwa (京の庭). Tokyo: Kokusai Jōhōsha, 1976. Photographs of the gardens of Kyoto. Text by Kantō Shigemori (重森完途). (in Japanese)
- Sado (佐渡) / Sado. Sonorama Shashin Sensho 2. Tokyo: Asahi Sonorama, 1977. Black-and-white photographs of Sado island. (in Japanese) With a short text in English, but the captions are in Japanese only.
- Karā Kyūtei no niwa (カラー宮廷の庭). Kyoto: Tankōsha, 1977. Color photographs of the gardens of Japanese palaces. (in Japanese)
  - Sentō Gosho (仙洞御所). Photographs of Sentō Imperial Palace. Text by Yukio Mishima and Teiji Itō. (in Japanese)
  - Katsura Rikyū (桂離宮). Photographs of Katsura Detached Palace. Text by Yasushi Inoue and Teiji Itō. (in Japanese)
  - Shugakuin Rikyū (修學院離宮). Photographs of Shugakuin Detached Palace. Text by Jirō Osaragi and Teiji Itō.
- The Japanese Garden. 2nd ed. Tokyo: Zokeisha, 1978. ISBN 0-87040-441-5. Text by Itō Teiji. (in English) Translation of Nihon no niwa.
- Kyō: Iro to katachi (京いろとかたち). Nihon no Bi (日本の美). Tokyo: Shūeisha, 1978. (in Japanese)
- Nihon no katachi (日本のかたち). Kyoto: Tankōsha, 1978. Text by Mitsukuni Yoshida (吉田光邦) and Yoshio Hayakawa (早川良雄) (in Japanese)
- Kyōto: Iwamiya Takeji jisenshū (京都 岩宮武二自選集). Osaka: Toki Shobō, 1979. Photographs of Kyoto. (in Japanese)
- Forms, Textures, Images: Traditional Japanese Craftmanship in Everyday Life. New York: Weatherhill, 1979. ISBN 0-8348-1519-2. Text by Mitsukuni Yoshida and Richard L. Gage. (in English)
- Mokuzen shingo (目前心後). Osaka: Iwamiya Takeji Shashin Jimusho, 1980. (in Japanese) A collection of writings by Iwamiya.
- Ankōru: Iwamiya Takeji shashinshū (アンコール 岩宮武二写真集). Tokyo: Iwanami Shoten, 1984. ISBN 4-00-008022-9. Photographs of Angkor Wat. Text by Yoshiaki Ishizawa 石沢良昭). (in Japanese)
- Utsukushii Hyōgo (美しい兵庫) / The Beautiful Hyogo. Hyōgo: Hyōgo Prefecture, 1986. (in Japanese) Iwamiya is editor and contributing photographer.
- Radakku mandara: Iwamiya Takeji shashinshū (ラダック曼荼羅 岩宮武二写真集). Tokyo: Iwanami Shoten, 1987. ISBN 4-00-008034-2. Color photographs of Ladakh and its mandalas. (in Japanese)
- Iwamiya Takeji-ten: Ima ni ikiru (岩宮武二展 今に生きる). Tokyo: PPS Tsūshinsha, 1989. ISBN 4-938635-27-5. Exhibition catalogue. (in Japanese)
- Ajia no butsuzō: Iwamiya Takeji shashinshū (アジアの仏像 岩宮武二写真集). Tokyo: Shūeisha, 1989. 2 vols. ISBN 4-08-531014-3. Photographs of Asian Buddhist statuary. Text by Takashi Koezuka (肥塚隆). (in Japanese)
- Sengo shashin / Saisei to tenkai (戦後写真・再生と展開) / Twelve Photographers in Japan, 1945–55. Yamaguchi: Yamaguchi Prefectural Museum of Art, 1990. (in Japanese) Despite the alternative title in English, almost exclusively in Japanese. Photographs by Iwamiya, pp. 115–21; text pp. 205–208.
- Japanese Gardens: Images, Concepts, Symbolism. Tokyo: Hitachi, 1990.
- Borobudūru: Iwamiya Takeji shashinshū (ボロブドゥ-ル 岩宮武二写真集). Tokyo: Iwanami Shoten, 1990. ISBN 4-00-008050-4. Black-and-white photographs of Borobudur. (in Japanese)
- Les cimes de l'éveil: Monastères bouddhiques du Ladakh. Paris: Hologramme, 1990. Text by Gilles Béguin. (in French)
- Ueda Shōji to sono nakama-tachi: 1935–55 (植田正治とその仲間たち：1935～55, Shōji Ueda and his friends, 1935–55). Yonago, Tottori: Yonago City Museum of Art, 1992. Catalogue of an exhibition held in February–March 1992, with works by Iwamiya on pp. 131–42. (in Japanese)
- Iwamiya Takeji sakuhin-ten: Sengo kara 1970 nendai made no sakka katsudō (岩宮武二作品展 戦後から1970年代までの作家活動). JCII Photo Salon Library 55. Tokyo: JCII Photo Salon, 1995. Catalogue of an exhibition of Iwamiya's works from the end of the war till the 1970s.. (in Japanese)
- Katachi: Classic Japanese Design. San Francisco: Chronicle, 1999. ISBN 0-8118-2547-7. Text by Kazuya Takaoka. (in English)
- Nihon no katachi (日本のかたち) / Katachi: Japanese Sacred Geometry. Tokyo: Pie, 1999. ISBN 4-89444-100-4. Text by Kazuya Takaoka (高岡一弥). 2005. ISBN 4-89444-462-3. (in Japanese) (in English)
- Kyōdo-sakka Iwamiya Takeji-ten zuroku: Shashin de toraeta bi to fūdo (郷土作家岩宮武二展図録: 写真でとらえた美と風土). Amagasaki, Hyōgo: Amagasaki Cultural Center, 2001. Exhibition catalogue. (in Japanese)
- Ajia e no shiten: Anri Karutie-buresson / Iwamiya Takeji (アジアへの視点: アンリ・カルティエ=ブレッソン／岩宮武二). Osaka: Osaka University of Arts Museum, 2002. Exhibition of photographs of Asia by Henri Cartier-Bresson and Iwamiya. (in Japanese)
