= Kashiwabara Museum =

Japanese museum

- 柏原美術館
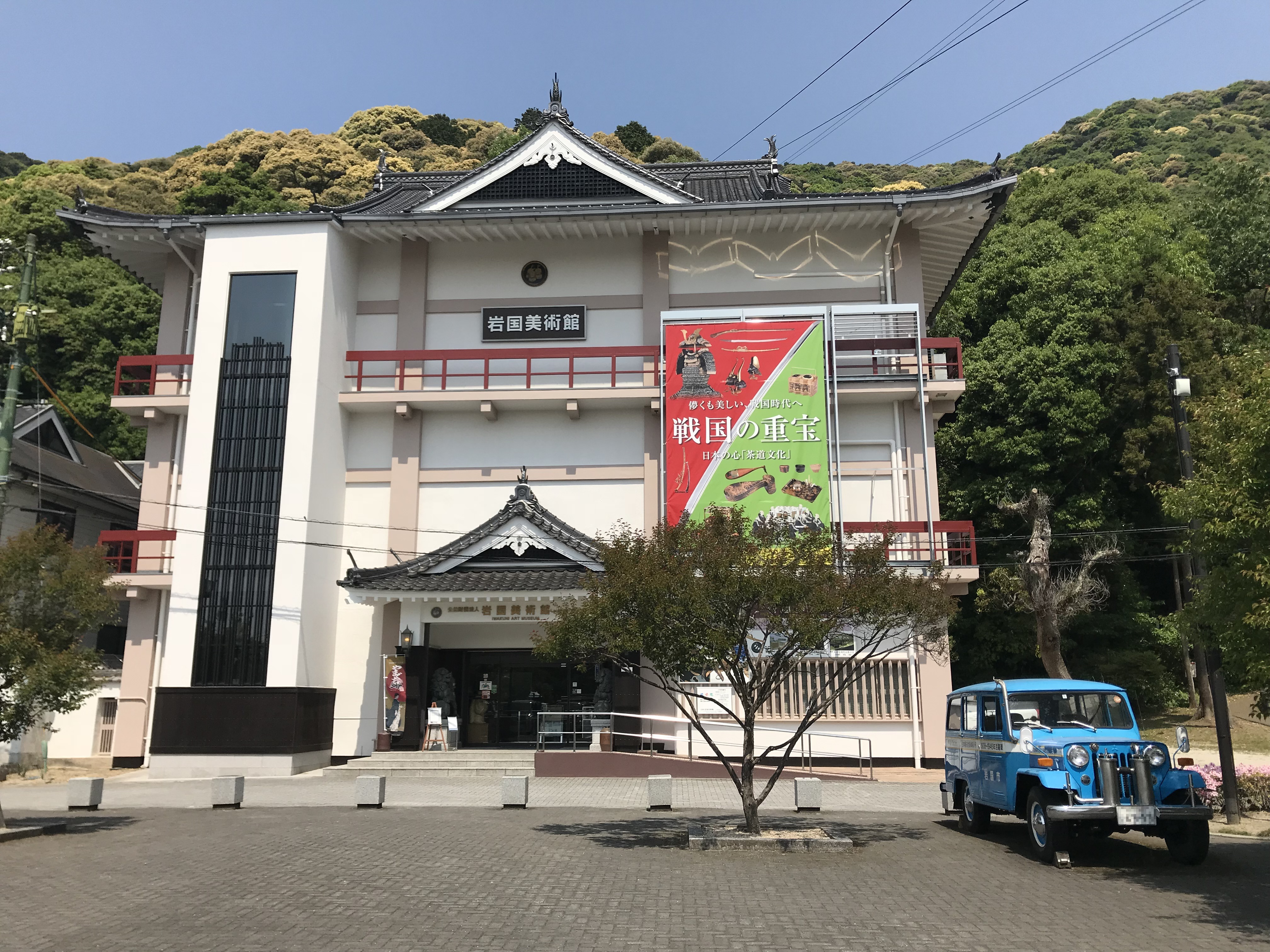

- Location within Yamaguchi Prefecture Location within Japan

General information
- Location: 2-10-27 Yokoyama, Iwakuni, Yamaguchi Prefecture, Japan
- Coordinates: 34°10′17″N 132°10′30″E
- Opened: 15 October 1963

Website
- Official website

Kashiwabara Museum (柏原美術館, Kashiwabara Bijutsukan) (formerly known as Iwakuni Art Museum) is a museum of traditional Japanese art in Iwakuni, Yamaguchi Prefecture, Japan. The museum opened in 1963. The collection includes a National Treasure sword (of the Nanboku-chō period, with an inscription in gold inlay of Tenshō 13 (1585)) and Important Cultural Property armour (haramaki, also of the Nanboku-chō period).

== See also ==
- List of National Treasures of Japan (crafts: swords)
- List of Cultural Properties of Japan - paintings (Yamaguchi)
- Yamaguchi Prefectural Museum of Art
- Iwakuni Castle, Kintai-kyō
- Kikkawa Historical Museum
- Iwakuni Chōkokan
