= Nakahara Chūya Memorial Museum =

Museum in Yamaguchi, Japan

- 中原中也記念館
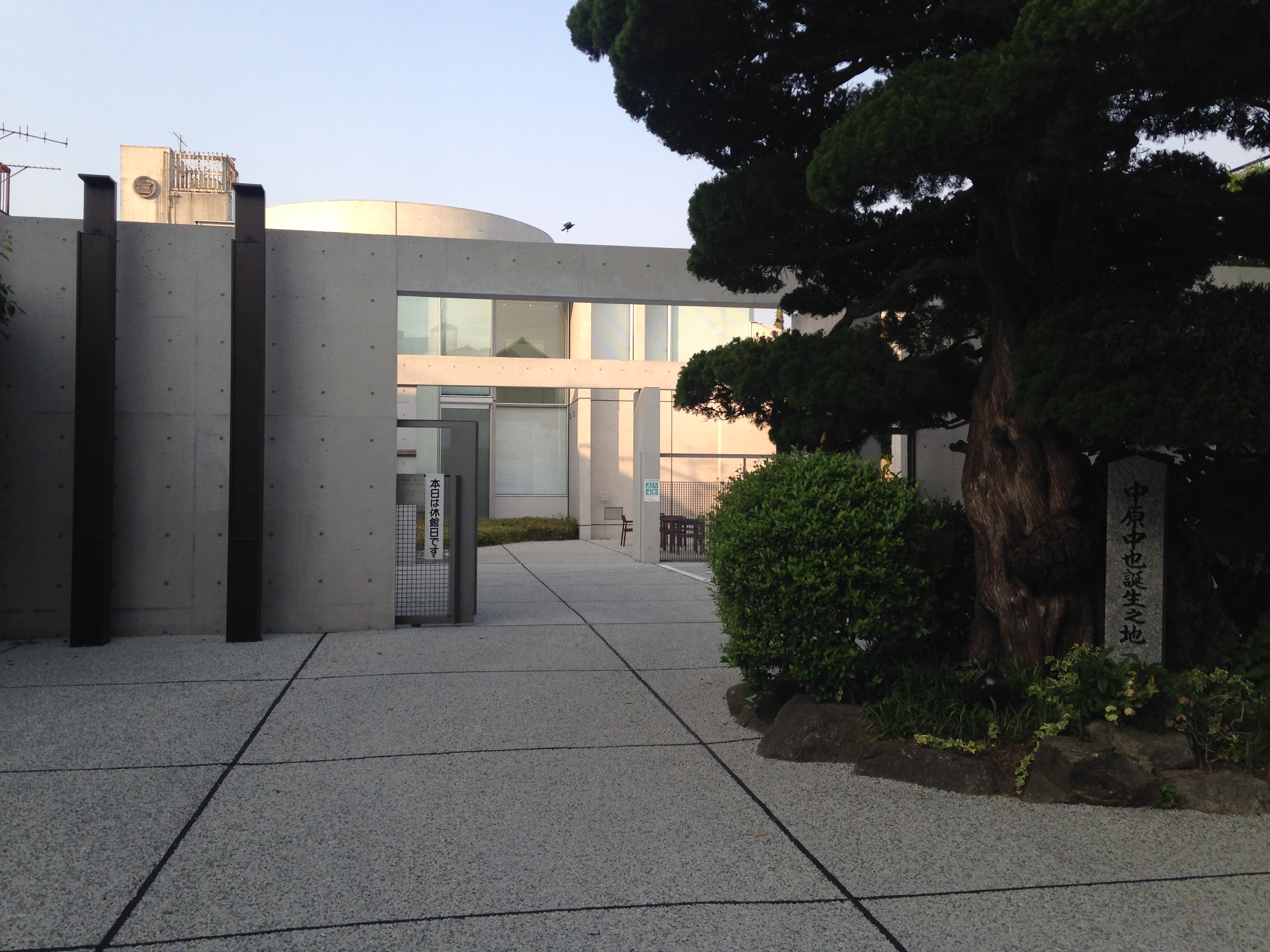
- Interactive map of the Nakahara Chūya Memorial Museum area

General information
- Location: 1-11-21 Yuda Onsen, Yamaguchi, Yamaguchi Prefecture, Japan
- Coordinates: 34°09′53″N 131°27′28″E
- Opened: 18 February 1994

Design and construction
- Architecture firm: Plant Associates [ja]

Website
- https://chuyakan.jp

Nakahara Chūya Memorial Museum (中原中也記念館, Nakahara Chūya Kinenkan) is a museum dedicated to the life and works of poet Nakahara Chūya in Yamaguchi, Yamaguchi Prefecture, Japan. Located on the site of his birthplace (other than for a storehouse and chashitsu, the original buildings were destroyed by fire in 1972), the museum opened in 1994. The museum was in 1998 selected among the 100 Top Public Buildings by the then Ministry of Construction.

== See also ==
- Yamaguchi Prefectural Museum
- Labyrinth of Cinema
