= Katsuji Fukuda =

Japanese photographer

Katsuji Fukuda (福田 勝治, Fukuda Katsuji; 1899–1991) was a Japanese photographer known for his photographs of still lifes and nudes, and also a writer of practical books about photography.

Fukuda was born on 11 January 1899 in Nakanoseki (later part of Hōfu), Yamaguchi (Japan). He moved to Tokyo in 1920, and worked at Takachiho Seisakujo (later renamed Olympus), where he worked making thermometers and developed an interest in photography, buying a Vest Pocket Kodak. The 1923 Kantō earthquake impelled him to leave the company and move to Kansai.

Fukuda ran a photographic studio in Sakai and Osaka, but this failed. He then worked as an editorial assistant on Hakuyō Fuchikami's periodical Hakuyō. A photograph he took in 1925, shown in an exhibition (titled 日本写真美術展覧会, Nihon Shashin Bijutsutenrankai) at Daimaru department store (Osaka) and elsewhere, won the Ilford Diamond Prize the following year. Fukuda then worked as a commercial photographer in Sakai and Hiroshima.

Fukuda moved back to Tokyo in 1933, where, influenced by Modernist trends from Europe (particularly Moholy-Nagy), he pursued a successful career as an advertising photographer. (Other than for a year at Hōfu toward the end of the war, Fukuda stayed in Tokyo for the rest of his life.) A series of photographs in Asahi Camera starting in 1936 and including portraits of Setsuko Hara and Takako Irie was very popular, and the next year Fukuda turned this into a book on photographing women that became a best-seller.

After the war, Fukuda published collections of nude studies and more books on photographic technique. He also experimented with color. The value he placed on the expression of beauty rendered his work old fashioned with the postwar wave of realism led by photographers such as Ken Domon, and the trends that followed this. In 1974 he was not even among one hundred living photographers profiled in a Camera Mainichi supplement. However, he contributed one volume (Shōka / Psalm) to the popular series "Sonorama Shashin Sensho" in 1979; in an afterword to this, Akira Hasegawa writes:

There are no photographers of women in Japan even today who have not been influenced by Fukuda in one way or another. Many techniques commonly used today were developed by Fukuda, a fact which has been forgotten.

Fukuda continued working in his old age. He died on 26 December 1991. The estimation of his work has since increased, and it is often anthologized in collections of Modernist and mid-century works. A major exhibition of his work was held in the Yamaguchi Prefectural Museum of Art in 1994.

Works by Fukuda are in the permanent collections of the National Museum of Modern Art, Tokyo, Yokohama Museum of Art, and Yamaguchi Prefectural Museum of Art.

== Books by Fukuda ==
- Genzō no jissai (現像の実際). Asahi Camera Sōsha 14. Tokyo: Asahi Shinbunsha, 1937. (in Japanese)
- Onna no utsushikata (女の寫し方) / Photokunst von Frauen. Tokyo: Ars, 1937. (in Japanese) Despite the German-language alternative title, all in Japanese.
- Haru no shashin-jutsu (春の写真術). Tokyo: Ars, 1938. (in Japanese)
- Watakushi no shashinshū: Sakuga no jissai (私の写真集：作画の実際) / Meine Foto-bilder. Tokyo: Ars, 1938. (in Japanese) Despite the German-language alternative title embossed in the cover, all in Japanese. Fifty-eight pages of black and white plates, followed by 84 pages of commentary and advice on photography.
- Haru no shashinshū (春の写真術) / Spring Photography. Tokyo: Ars, 1939. (in Japanese)
- Onna no utsushikata: zoku (女の寫し方：續). Tokyo: Ars, 1939. (in Japanese)
- Seibutsu shashin no tsukurikata (静物写真の作り方). Ars Shashin Bunko 18. Tokyo: Ars, 1939. How to photograph still lifes. (in Japanese)
- Ginza (銀座, Ginza). Tokyo: Genkōsha, 1941. With an essay by Tama Morita (森田たま). (in Japanese)
- Ushi kau shōgakkō (牛飼ふ小学校). Tokyo: Genkōsha, 1941. (in Japanese)
- Shuppatsu (出發, Departure). Tokyo: Kōgasō, 1942. (in Japanese) A miscellany of photographs: nature, women, still lifes, etc.
- Jingu Gaien (神宮外苑). Tokyo: Nihon Shashin Kōgeisha, 1942. (in Japanese)
- Rafu gotai (裸婦五態). Tokyo: Ivuningusutā-sha, 1946. (in Japanese)
- Onna no utsushikata (女の寫し方). Tokyo: Seiusha, 1947. (in Japanese) A booklet; not the same as the identically titled book published ten years earlier. Photographs of women, clothed and nude.
- Hana to rafu to (花と裸婦と, Flowers and nude women) / Nude et fleur. Tokyo: Ivuningusutā-sha, 1947. (in Japanese) Flowers, nude women, their combination, etc. Despite the alternative title, in Japanese only.
- Shashin geijutsu (写真芸術). Tokyo: Kōgasō, 1949. (in Japanese)
- Iro to hikari no geijutsu: Fukuda Katsuji tennenshoku shashin sakuhinshū (色と光の芸術：福田勝治天然色写真作品集). Tokyo: Ondorisha, 1951. (in Japanese)
- Mite wakaru shashin no utsushikata (見てわかる写真のうつし方). Tokyo: Onodorisha, 1951. (in Japanese)
- Watakushi-tachi no kimono (私たちのきもの). Seikatsu Gurabia Sōsho. Tokyo: Ondorisha, 1951. (in Japanese)
- Ginza (銀座). Tokyo: Ars, 1952. (in Japanese)
- Onna no utsushikata (女の写し方). Tokyo: Ars, 1955. Special issue of Camera, July. (in Japanese)
- Kamera no sekai (カメラの世界). Zusetsu Bunko 32. Tokyo: Kaiseisha, 1957. (in Japanese)
- Atarashiki miwaku (新しき魅惑). Nippon Camera rinji zōkan. Tokyo: Nippon Camera-sha, 1958. (in Japanese) Women (mostly nudes).
- Kyōto (京都) / Kyoto. Tokyo: Iwasaki Shoten, 1958. (in Japanese)
- Bi no tabiji (美の旅路). Tokyo: Futsūsha, 1962. (in Japanese)
- Shōka (頌歌) / Psalm. Sonorama Shashin Sensho 19. Tokyo: Asahi Sonorama, 1979. (in Japanese and English) Women (some of them nude), still lifes, and photographs from Fukuda's 1955 travel in Italy. No captions, but with some text in English as well as Japanese.
- Shashinka Fukuda Katsuji-ten: Kokō no modanisuto (写真家福田勝治展：孤高のモダニスト) / Katsuji Fukuda. Yamaguchi: Yamaguchi Prefectural Museum of Art, 1994. (in Japanese) Catalogue of a major exhibition of Fukuda's work held at the Yamaguchi Prefectural Museum of Art in 1994.

== Other books showing works by Fukuda ==
- Klochko, Deborah, ed. Modern Photography in Japan 1915–1940. San Francisco: The Friends of Photography, 2001. ISBN 0-933286-74-0. (in English) The plates are not paginated but are alphabetically ordered by photographer. One still life of Fukuda's from 1925 is shown.
- Matsumoto Norihiko. (松本徳彦), ed. A Collection of Japanese Photographs 1912–1940. Tokyo: Shashinkosha, 1990. (in Japanese) Despite its English-only title, the book is in Japanese only. Plate 18 is a still life by Fukuda from 1925.
- Modanizumu no jidai (モダニズムの時代) / The Age of Modernism. Tokyo: Tokyo Metropolitan Museum of Photography, 1995. (in English and Japanese) Catalogue of an exhibition held 1995–96 at the Tokyo Metropolitan Museum of Photography. Three still lifes from 1925 on p. 42, a portrait on p. 74.
- Nihon nūdo meisakushū (日本ヌード名作集, Japanese nudes). Camera Mainichi bessatsu. Tokyo: Mainichi Shinbunsha, 1982. (in Japanese) Pp. 81–88 show Fukuda's work from 1946 to 1980.
- Nihon kindai shashin no seiritsu to tenkai (日本近代写真の成立と展開) / The Founding and Development of Modern Photography in Japan. Tokyo: Tokyo Museum of Photography, 1995. (in Japanese and English) Plates 166 and 167 are of works by Fukuda.
- Nihon no shashin: Uchinaru katachi, sotonaru katachi 2: Sengo shashin no hen'yō: 1945–80 (日本の写真 内なるかたち・外なるかたち 2 戦後写真の変容 1945～80) / Japanese Photography: Form In/Out 2: The Transformation of Photography in the Postwar Era: 1945–80. Tokyo: Tokyo Metropolitan Museum of Photography, 1996. (in Japanese and English) Exhibition catalogue. A nude from 1946 is shown on p. 40.
- Sengo shashin / Saisei to tenkai (戦後写真・再生と展開) / Twelve Photographers in Japan, 1945–55. Yamaguchi: Yamaguchi Prefectural Museum of Art, 1990. (in Japanese) Despite the alternative title in English, almost exclusively in Japanese (although each of the twelve has a potted chronology in English). Pp. 82–92 show Fukuda's works from 1925 to 1965.
- Shashinka wa nani o hyōgen shita ka: 1945–1960 (写真家はなにを表現したか1945～1960, What were photographers expressing? 1945–1960). Tokyo: Konica Plaza, 1991. (in Japanese) Three postwar works and a potted chronology on pp. 48–49.
