= Mōri Museum =

Museum in Hofu, Yamaguchi Prefecture, Japan

- 毛利博物館
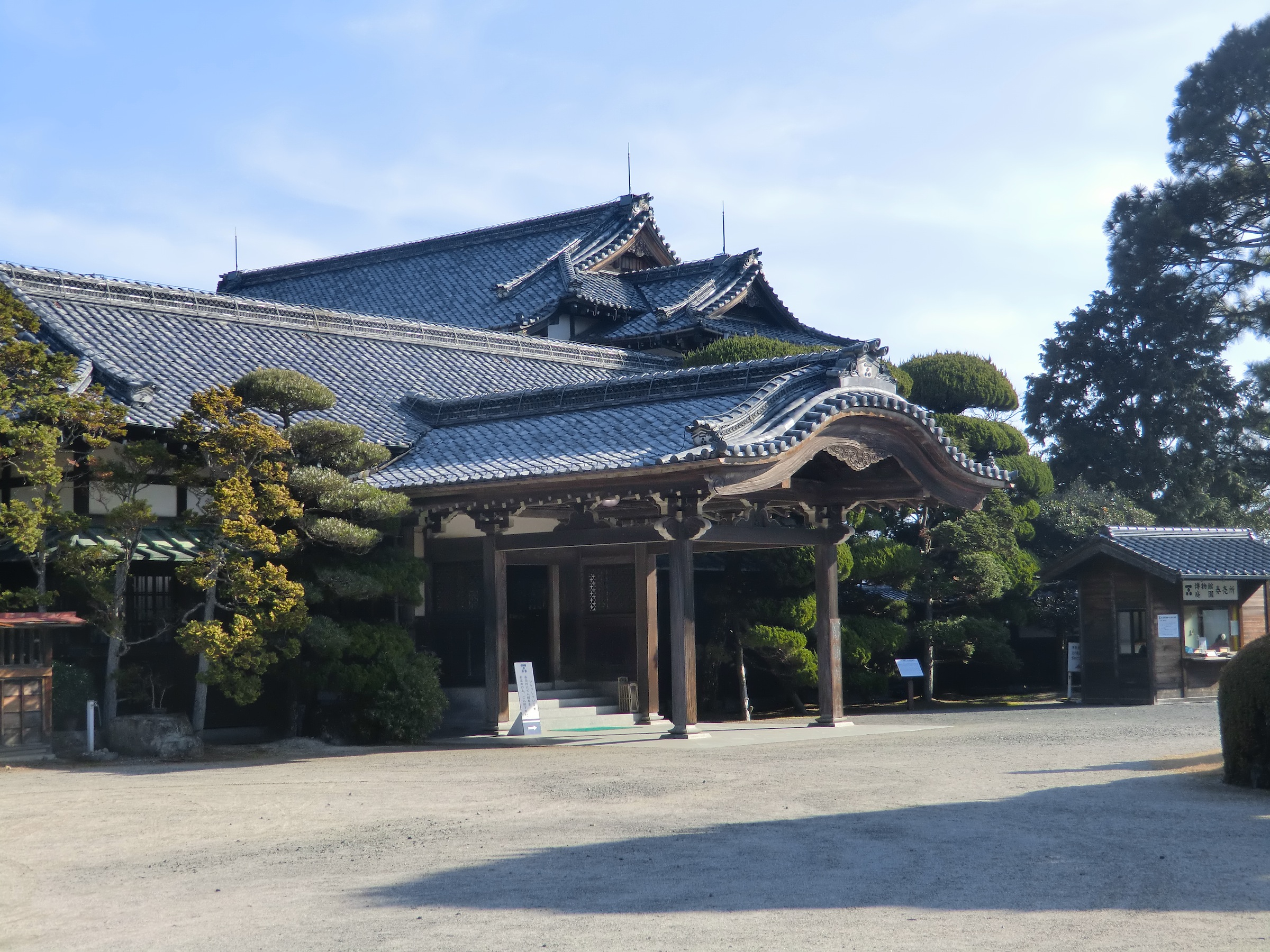
- Former Mōri Clan Main Residence (1916) (ICP)

General information
- Location: 1-15-1 Tatara, Hōfu, Yamaguchi Prefecture, Japan
- Coordinates: 34°03′48″N 131°35′15″E
- Opened: January 1966

Website
- Official website

Mōri Museum (毛利博物館, Mōri Hakubutsukan) opened in Hōfu, Yamaguchi Prefecture, Japan, in 1966. It occupies part of the Former Mōri Clan Main Residence, dating from the Meiji and Taishō periods, of which twelve component structures have been jointly designated an Important Cultural Property and the gardens a Place of Scenic Beauty. The collection of some twenty thousand objects includes four National Treasures, nine Important Cultural Properties, and nine Prefectural Cultural Properties.

== National Treasures ==
The four National Treasures are Heian-period scrolls from Records of the Grand Historian and Kokin Wakashū, a Kamakura-period sword, and Sesshū's Long Landscape Scroll.

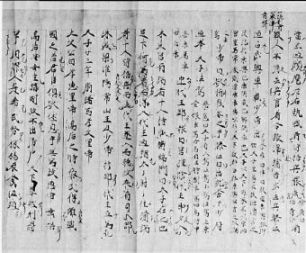
Records of the Grand Historian

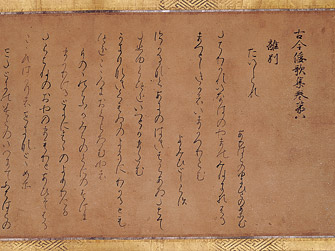
Kokin Wakashū

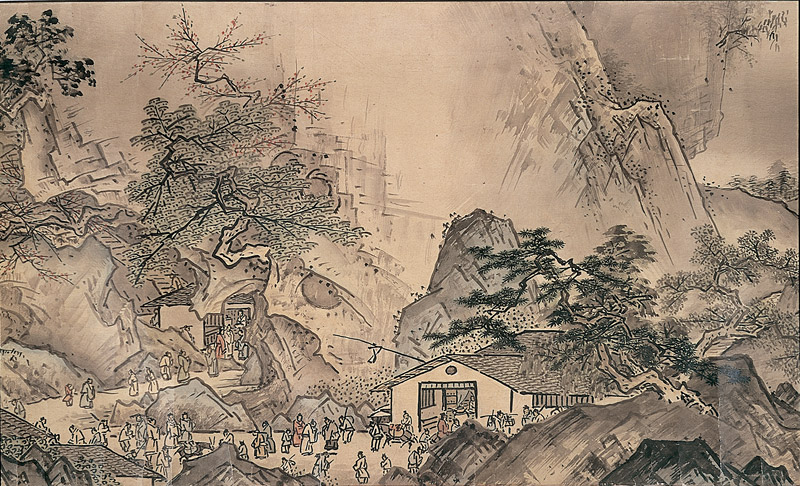
Landscapes of the Four Seasons, by Sesshū

== See also ==
- Hōfu Tenman-gū
- Landscape by Sesshū (Ōhara Collection)
- List of Cultural Properties of Japan - paintings (Yamaguchi)
- List of Places of Scenic Beauty of Japan (Yamaguchi)
- List of National Treasures of Japan (writings: Chinese books)
- List of National Treasures of Japan (writings: Japanese books)
- List of National Treasures of Japan (crafts: swords)
- List of National Treasures of Japan (paintings)
- Yamaguchi Prefectural Museum
