= Yōichi Midorikawa =

Japanese photographer

Yōichi Midorikawa (緑川 洋一, Midorikawa Yōichi; 1915–2001), birth name Satoshi Yokoyama (横山 知), was a Japanese photographer from Okayama prefecture, Japan, who became one of postwar Japan's leading figures in color landscape photography. He first took up the camera after graduating middle school in Okayama, but his father forced him into studying Dentistry. He returned to photography as a hobby around the same time he opened his own dentil clinic in 1937. Throughout his life, he maintained his base in Okayama. He later joined the Chūgoku Photographers Group, alongside figures such as Shoji Ueda, and Ginryūsha with Tadahiko Hayashi and Shōtarō Akiyama.

HIs first work appear in monthly photo competitions in the 1930s. His early work, produced during the Pacific war, focused on photojournalism, followed by documentary photography depicting fishing villages, salt fields, rural communities around the Seto Inland Sea, and Osaka Merchant districts. From the 1950s onward, however, he turned to experimental forms of expression, employing techniques such as multiple exposure, long exposure, photomontage, filter works, and special film processing to create his dreamlike landscapes. He began using color film in the early 1960s, before it had come into widespread use.

His breakthrough came with the1962 photobook Seto Inland Sea / Setonaikai, which won several awards from the Japan Photo Critics Association and the Photographic Society of Japan Award. Thereafter, he continued his exploration of landscape photography, taking photos of Japanese national parks and other natural sites throughout Japan. He is often described as a “magician of color.” Over the course of his career, he published more than seventy photobooks.

Midorikawa's photographs have been widely exhibited in Japan and internationally, and his works are represented in major public collections such as the Tokyo Photographic Art Museum, the Yokohama Museum of Art, Victoria and Albert Museum. And the Bibliothèque national de France.

Midorikawa's photographs were included in Donald Richie's travel memoir titled, The Inland Sea, about the region and its disappearing traditions.

The exhibition Midorikawa Yoichi and his Circle: The Early Years, 1938-59, held at the Okayama Prefectural Museum of Art in 2005, sought to reexamine Midorikawa's early works in order to trace the process through which he developed the richly saturated colors, multiple exposures, and other experimental techniques that culminated in the landscape photographs of the 1960s, earning him the epithet the “magician of color.” Curator Naruhisa Hirose surveys Midorikawa ‘s first appearances in the photography magazine Shashin Salon to his various photo series from the 1950s, and his relationships to contemporaneous photographers including Shoji Ueda, Shōtarō Akiyama, Tadahiko Hayashi, and Takeji Iwamiya.

== Early Career ==
His first published photograph, Still Life, appeared in the December 1939 issue of Shashin Salon after being selected for the magazine's monthly competition. His early works largely followed conventions of pictorial “art photography,” but he also produced works depicting young women working in factories, revealing an early interest in contemporary social life.

During the war, Midorikawa, like many amateur photographers, was gradually drawn into wartime national policy. Advised either to stay silent or document life in his home region, he chose the latter. He took extensive photographic essays on salt fields, recording both the laborers and the modernization of the industry. Another important series documented Okayama Castle before its destruction by air raids, employing compositional devices reminiscent of Japanese art, such as framing the castle with overhanging branches and foreground trees.

== Post war ==
After the war Midorikawa photographed the destruction of Okayama City and neighboring Fukuyama City, as a member of the press corps. But according to later accounts, these photographs were destroyed before Allied Occupation began. In 1947, through Ryōsuke Ishizu, he joined Ginryūsha, a newly established association of professional and amateur photographers based in Tokyo, while also participating in the newly formed the All Okayama Camera Club, expanding opportunities for exhibition and exchange with photographers both locally and in Tokyo.

An important development in his postwar works was the introduction of women as a principal subject. His earliest examples appeared in the December 1948 issue of Camera magazine and over the following years he produced a diverse body of portraits including studio portraits, outdoor figures, nude studios, and silhouette compositions. However, Midorikawa later abandoned portrait photography, reflecting that he was simply unsuited to photographing women. Rather than competing with metropolitan photographer such as Shōtarō Akiyama, whose careers centered on glamorous professional models, he increasing turned towards subjects in his own surroundings. Supported by his stable career as a dentist, Midorikawa was free from the commercial pressures faced by professional photographers and could pursue subjects according to his own interests.

Hirose also notes Midorikawa's close relationship with Shōji Ueda. Together with Ken Domon, they participated in a photographic excursion to the Tottori Sand Dunes organized by Camera magazine, and several of Midorikawa's works from this period display compositional strategies that are very similar to that of Ueda's iconic sand dune works.

== The Seto Inland Sea ==
Although Midorikawa had photographed the Seto Inland Sea region before and during the war, the scope of his subjects expanded considerably during the 1950s. He documented the Hiroshima Atomic Bomb Dome and the everyday lives of local residents; Ōkunoshima, where the Japanese military manufactured poison gas and which was later occupied by the U.S. military during the Korean War; the ruins of the former Kure Navel Arsenal; and the postwar revival of Japan's shipbuilding industry.

He also continued producing documentary series on fisherman, refinery workers, dock workers, industrial laborers, and other laborers. Hirose argues, however, that these differ from the social activism associated with Ken Domon. Rather than social critique, Midorikawa was equally concerned with the sculptural forms of the human body.

Among these documentary projects, Hirose identifies Midorikawa's Saidaiji naked festival series as one of the defining achievements of his early career. Produced as part of a collaborative project involving local scholars, artists, writers, and photographers to document the region's traditions, the resulting publication featured contributions from more than thirty photographers. Midorikawa distinguished himself through his comprehensive approach, photographing not only the festival itself but the preparations, rituals, and activities surround the event. He was also among a select few who were permitted to climb the temple rafters, allowing him to capture dramatic overhead views of the crowds. He exhibited his photographs independently and the series received the Nikakai Prize in its newly established photography division.

Throughout the 1950s, Midorikawa also documented many aspects of everyday life that have since disappeared, including seasonal migrant farmers, land reclamation projects, floating houseboats, and other communities and sites in the Seto Inland Sea. Hirose argues that, despite their documentary character, these photographs are not primarily concerned with social commentary. Midorikawa consistently emphasized form and composition which would later develop into his experiments with long exposure, multiple exposure, and other techniques.

== Travels Abroad ==
In 1958, Midorikawa won the Canon Photo Contest, and the following year in 1959 travelled to Europe via Sri Lanka and Egypt. Hirose argues that the fishing villages and coastl landscape that he photographed aboard have a continuity with his photographs around the Seto Inland Sea. Likewise, his photographs of Gustav Vigeland’s sculptures in Oslo echo the intertwined bodies of his Saidaiji naked festival photographs, suggested that the European journey reinforced, rather than transformed, his identity as a photographer that he had developed until that point.

== Critical Analysis ==
Photography historian Masako Toda notes that many Japanese photographers associated with the postwar Subjective Photography movement had already been active before the war. During wartime, avant-garde photography influenced by Surrealism was “curtailed due to censorship by the authorities,” prompting many photographers to redirect their attnteion toward their native regions. This tendency often took the firm of photographic ethnography, exemplified by Hiroshi Hamaya’s series Yukuguni (Snow Country) which documented the customs and everyday life of northern Japan.

Midorikawa’s activities should be understood as within this broader context. After joining the Chūgoku Photographs Group in 1940, which included photographers such as Shoji Ueda and Kunio Masaoka, Midorikawa was advised by fellow members to photograph the landscapes, people, festivals of his home region. What began as a practical response to wartime circumstances would become a defining characteristic of his career.

Regional subjects continued to occupy a central place in Japanese postwar photography, even as avant-garde practices reemerged. Groups such as the Kyoto Photo Society experimented with surrealist imagery, while organizations suppressed during the war, including the Bijutsu Bunka Association, resumed their activities and pursued increasingly abstract modes of expression. Over time, these developments gave rise to a variety of postwar photographic trajectories.

It was within this environment that photographers like Midorikawa and Shoji Ueda developed a distinctive approach. Unlike photographers who pursued abstraction, their work remained grounded in the landscapes and communities of western Japan.
