= Yūtokutaishi Akiyama =

Japanese artist (1935–2020)

Yūtokutaishi Akiyama (秋山 祐徳太子, Akiyama Yūtokutaishi) (1935 – 3 April 2020), born Sukenori Akiyama (秋山 祐徳), was a Japanese engraver artist, photographer, and occasional politician.

== Biography ==
Born in Tokyo, Akiyama studied engraving at Musashino Art School (the predecessor to Musashino Art University) and then worked as an industrial designer for an electrical company. He started exhibiting his own tin engravings and other work from 1965, and in both 1975 and 1979 ran for Governor of Tokyo, bringing his pop art into the process. From 1999 until 2003, Akiyama was an adjunct professor at Sapporo University. From 1992 until around 2009, Akiyama joined Genpei Akasegawa and Yutaka Takanashi in the informal group Raika Dōmei.

Exhibitions of his work include "Akiyama Yūtokutaishi no sekai-ten" (秋山祐徳太子の世界展) in Ikeda 20-Seiki Bijutsukan (池田20世紀美術館, Itō, Shizuoka) in 1994. Work by Akiyama is in the permanent collection of the Tokushima Modern Art Museum.

He appears in the film Yūheisha/Terorisuto (2007), directed by Masao Adachi.

== Publications ==
- Tsūzokuteki geijutsuron: Poppu-āto no tatakai (通俗的芸術論 ポップ・ア-トのたたかい). Tokyo: Doyō Bijutsusha, 1985. (in Japanese)
- Hōmatsu ketsujin retsuden: Shirazaru chō-zen'ei (泡沫桀人列伝 知られざる超前衛). Tokyo: Nigensha, 2002. ISBN 4-544-02037-9. (in Japanese)
- Buriki otoko (ブリキ男). Tokyo: Shōbunsha, 2007. ISBN 978-4-7949-6708-4. (in Japanese)
- Tennen rōjin: Konna ni tanoshii dokkyo-seikatsu (天然老人 こんなに楽しい独居生活). ASCII Shinsho. Tokyo: ASCII Media Works, 2008. ISBN 978-4-04-867241-2. (in Japanese)
