= Yutaka Takanashi =

Japanese photographer (born 1935)

Yutaka Takanashi (高梨 豊, Takanashi Yutaka; born 6 February 1935) is a Japanese photographer who has photographed fashion, urban design, and city life, and is best known for his depiction of Tokyo.

== Life and career ==
Takanashi was born on 6 February 1935 in Shirogane-chō, Ushigome-ku (now Shinjuku), Tokyo. In 1943 he was evacuated to Saitama (Saitama). In 1953 he graduated from Tokyo Metropolitan Aoyama High School and entered the photography department of Nihon University. His first camera was a Canon IVSb 35 mm rangefinder.

In 1956 Takanashi's photographs won awards from Sankei Camera magazine. He graduated from university in 1957, and tried but failed to enter various news companies, settling for darkroom work in Ginza for the photographer Osamu Yagi (八木治). His university graduation work was published in the September issue of Sankei Camera. After meeting Kiyoji Ōtsuji, he entered Kuwasawa Design School in 1959, graduating in 1961.

In May 1960 he had his first solo exhibition, of work from his series "Somethin' Else", in Ginza Garō. His second exhibition featured work from the same series, face-on images of buildings taken with a 4×5 large format camera.

In 1961 Takanashi married Reiko Mizoguchi.

Between 1961 and 1970 he worked at Nippon Design Center doing commercial photography.

Takanashi was a member of the collective that produced Provoke magazine in 1968 and 1969.

Takanashi had a tenured position at Tokyo Zokei University from 1980 until 2000 (a full professor from 1983), whereupon he retired but continued teaching there part-time.

From 1992, Takanashi, Genpei Akasegawa and Yūtokutaishi Akiyama worked together in the group Raika Dōmei.

Takanashi won the Annual Award of the Photographic Society of Japan twice, in 1984 and 1993.

== Exhibitions ==
=== Solo exhibitions ===
- "Somethin' Else". Ginza Garō (Ginza, Tokyo), 1960.
- "Hyōteki" (標的, Target). Ginza Garō (Ginza, Tokyo), 1962.
- "Tenshi kikō" (天使紀行, White Houri). Wako (Ginza, Tokyo), 1974.
- "Machi" (町, Town). Minolta Photo Space (Tokyo), 1978.
- "Jinzō" (人像, Human Images). Minolta Photo Space (Osaka), 1979.
- "Tōkyōjin 1978–1982" (東京人 1978～1982) / "Tokyoites 1978–1982". Olympus Gallery (Tokyo), 1982.
- "Jinzō II" (人像II, Human Images II). Minolta Photo Space (Tokyo), 1986.
- "Tokyo-jin 1978–1983". Espace Japon (Paris), 1986.
- "Miyako no kao: 1986–1988" (都の貌 1986～1988) / "Visages of a Metropolis 1986–1988". Inax Gallery 2 (Kyōbashi, Tokyo), 1988.
- "Sorezore no machi" (それぞれの街) / "Each Town". Setagaya Art Museum (Setagaya, Tokyo), 1988.
- "Magajīn" (マガジーン) / "Magazine". Ginza Canon Salon (Tokyo), 1988.
- "Toshi e/kara ten" (都市へ・から展, Towards/from the City). Frog (Tokyo), 1989.
- "Hatsukuni" (初国) / "Pre-landscape". Minolta Photo Space (Tokyo), 1992.
- "Tōkyō Ginza sandaiki" (東京・銀座三代記, Three Generations, Ginza, Tokyo). Gallery Art-Graph (Tokyo), 1995. One exhibition in a series of three, the other exhibitors being Shigeichi Nagano and Osamu Kanemura.
- "Shikku suru shashinka: Takanashi Yutaka 'hōhōron' no kanata e, ten" (疾駆する写真家高梨豊〈方法論〉の彼方ヘ、展, A rushing photographer, Yutaka Takanashi: Going beyond methodology). Guardian Garden (Tokyo), 1996.
- "Takanashi Yutaka gyararī" (高梨豊ギャラリー) / "Yutaka Takanashi Gallery". Canon Makuhara Wonder Museum (Chiba City), 1999.
- "Interlude". Art Gallery C-Square, Chukyo University (Nagoya), June–July 2000.
- "Tōkyō Zōkei Daigaku taishoku kinen shashin-kōza-ten: Takanashi Yutaka 'Shashin, hito ni yotte'" (東京造形大学退職記念写真講座展 高梨豊「写真、人によって」). Tokyo Zokei University Yokoyama Memorial Manzù Art Museum (Hachiōji, Tokyo), 2000.
- "Chimeiron" (地名論) / "Genius Loci, Tokyo". Konica Plaza (Tokyo), 2000.
- "Windscape — shasō kara" (Windscape — 車窓から). Visual Arts Gallery (Osaka), 20.
- "Warera no emono wa itteki no hikari" (我らの獲物は一滴の光, Our Target is a Drop of Light). Photographers' Gallery (Shinjuku, Tokyo), January 2003.
- "Wind Scape". Shoo Museum of the Arts (Shōō, Okayama), 2003.
- "Nostalghia". Photographers' Gallery (Shinjuku, Tokyo), September 2004.
- "Hatsukuni" (初国) / "Pre-landscape". Shadai Gallery (Tokyo Polytechnic University, Nakano, Tokyo), September–October 2006.
- "Kakoi machi" (囲市). Canon Gallery S (Minato, Tokyo), March–June 2007.
- "Takanashi Yutaka: Hikari no fīrudonōto" (高梨豊 光のフィールドノート) / "Yutaka Takanashi: Field Notes of Light". National Museum of Modern Art, Tokyo, January–March 2009.
- "Yutaka Takanashi: Photography 1965-74". Galerie Priska Pasquer (Cologne), April–June 2010.
- "Yutaka Takanashi". Henri Cartier-Bresson Foundation, Paris. May 10 - July 29, 2012.

=== Selection of other joint exhibitions ===
This list does not include the exhibitions of Raika Dōmei.

- "Gendai shashin no 10-nin" (現代写真の10人) / "Ten Artists of Contemporary Japanese Photography". National Museum of Modern Art, Tokyo, 1966.
- "Dai-10-kai Nihon gendai bijutsuten" (第10回日本現代美術展, 10th Exhibition of Japanese Contemporary Art). Tokyo Metropolitan Art Museum, 1971.
- "15-nin no shashinka" (15人の写真家) / "15 Photographers Today". National Museum of Modern Art, Tokyo, 1974.
- "Neue Fotografie aus Japan". Kunsthaus Graz, and elsewhere, 1976.
- "photokina 1978" (Cologne), 1978.
- "Pari, Nyūyōku, Tōkyō" (パリ・ニューヨーク・東京) / "Paris—New York—Tokyo". Tsukuba Museum of Photography 1985 (Tsukuba, Ibaraki), 1985.
- "11-nin no 1965–75: Nihon no shashin wa kaeraretaka" (11人の1965～75 日本の写真は変えられたか) / "11 Photographers in Japan, 1965–75". Yamaguchi Prefectural Museum of Art, 1989.
- "Toshi no shisen" (東京 都市の視線) / "Tokyo: A City Perspective". Tokyo Metropolitan Museum of Photography, June–July 1990.
- "Sengo bunka no kiseki 1945–1995" (戦後文化の軌跡1945–1995) / "Japanese Culture: The 50 Postwar Years". Meguro Museum of Art, Tokyo (Meguro, Tokyo), and elsewhere, 1995.
- "25-nin no 20-dai no shashin" (25人の20代の写真) / "Works by 25 Photographers in their 20s". Kiyosato Museum of Photographic Arts (Takane, Yamanashi), 1995.
- "85/05: Maboroshi no Tsukuba Shashin Bijutsukan kara no 20-nen" (85/05幻のつくば写真美術館からの20年). Sendai Mediatheque (Sendai), April–May 2005.
- "Unasera di Tōkyō: Anohi anotokio: Zanzō no Tōkyō monogatari 1935–1992" (ウナセラ・ディ・トーキョー anohi anotokio 残像の東京物語1935～1992). Setagaya Art Museum (Setagaya), Tokyo, April–May 2005.
- "Meganeura 2005" (メガネウラ 2005) / "ICANOF Media Art Show 2005 'Meganeura'". Hachinohe City Museum of Art (Hachinohe, Aomori), September–October 2005.
- "Barabara ni natta karada" (ばらばらになった身体) / "Body in Pieces". Museum of Modern Art, Tokyo, October–December 2006.

== Permanent collections ==
Takanashi's works are held by:

- Setagaya Art Museum (Setagaya, Tokyo)
- National Museum of Modern Art, Tokyo
- Tokyo Metropolitan Museum of Photography
- Tokyo Zokei University
- Yamaguchi Prefectural Museum of Art

== Bibliography ==
=== Books by Takanashi ===
- Toshi e (都市へ, "Towards the city"). And Tōkyōjin nōto (東京人ノート). Izara Shobō, 1974. (in Japanese) The two books were published as a pair.
  - Reduced size reproduction of both volumes: New York: Errata, 2010. ISBN 978-1-935004-10-3.
- Machi (町, "Town"). Tokyo: Asahi Shinbun, 1977. (in Japanese) The pages of the book itself have no captions or text; a brochure supplied with the book identifies the precise address of every photograph.
- Jinzō (人像). Shin'ya Soshosha, 1979.
- Shin Oku no hosomichi (新おくのほそ道) / The New "Oku no Hosomichi" Revisited. Nihon no Kokoro. Tokyo: Shūeisha, 1982. (in Japanese) Fifty views along "Oku no hosomichi".
- Tōkyōjin 1978-1983 (東京人 1978〜1983). Tokyo: Shoshi Yamada, 1983. (in Japanese)
- Takakura Ken shashinshū Eizō 25 (高倉健写真集 映像25) 1983. (in Japanese)
- Miyako no kao (都の貌) / Visages of a Metropolis. Tokyo: IPC, 1989. ISBN 4-87198-796-5. Reissued in 1992 in different binding but with the same ISBN. The photographs are captioned, short texts by Makoto Ōtake (大竹誠) on each photograph are on a separate sheet; all this is in Japanese only. (in Japanese)
- Menbō yakujo: Jinbutsu shashin kuronikuru (面目躍如人 物写真クロニクル 1964～1989). Tokyo: Heibonsha, 1990. ISBN 4-582-27721-7. (in Japanese)
- Hatsukuni (初國) / Pre-Landscape. Tokyo: Heibonsha, 1993. ISBN 4-582-27727-6. (in Japanese)
- Chimeiron (地名論) / Genius Loci, Tokyo. Tokyo: Mainichi Communications, 2000. ISBN 4-8399-0438-3. (in Japanese)
- Raika no me (ライカな眼). Tokyo: Mainichi Communications, 2002. ISBN 4-8399-0708-0. (in Japanese)
- Nosutarujia (ノスタルジア) / Nostalghia. And Windscape. Tokyo: Heibonsha, 2004. ISBN 4-582-27756-X. (in Japanese) The two were published as a pair; the much smaller Windscape accompanying Nostalghia.
- Kakoi machi (囲市) / Kakoi-machi. Tokyo: Creo, 2007. ISBN 978-4-87736-116-7. (in Japanese) Color photographs of Tokyo and its environs. The captions (month and place) are in English only, the (little) other text is in Japanese only.
- Photography 1965–1974. Berlin: Only Photography, 2010. ISBN 978-3-9812537-2-6. (in English, German, and Japanese) (Note: Details of this book may be found at the publisher's page about it.)
- Yutaka Takanashi: Toshi-e. Books on Books 6. Errata Editions, 2010. ISBN 978-1-935004-10-3. (in English) Reduced reproduction of the content of Toshi-e and Tōkyōjin. With text by Gōzō Yoshimasu and Gerry Badger.
- Nitchi Tōkyō (ニッチ東京) / Niche Tokyo. Tokyo: Taka Ishii, 2015.

=== Other works with contributions by Takanashi ===
This list does not include the books published as by Raika Dōmei.

- 15-nin no shashinka (15人の写真家) / 15 Photographers Today. Tokyo: National Museum of Modern Art, Tokyo, 1974.
- With Takahiko Okada (岡田隆彦). Toshi wa yume mizu (都市は夢みず). Tokyo: Shoshi Yamada, 1979.
- Raimei no kubikazari: Takiguchi Shūzō ni (雷鳴の頚飾り 滝口修造に). Tokyo: Raimei no kubikazari Kankōkai, 1979. (in Japanese)
- 11-nin no 1965–75: Nihon no shashin wa kaeraretaka (11人の1965～75 日本の写真は変えられたか) / 11 Photographers in Japan, 1965–75. Yamaguchi: Yamaguchi Prefectural Museum of Art, 1989.
- Tōkyō: Toshi no shisen (東京 都市の視線) / Tokyo: A City Perspective. Tokyo: Tokyo Metropolitan Museum of Photography, 1990. (in Japanese and English) Exhibition catalogue. Photographs from the series "Tokyoites" appear on pp. 116–21.
- 25-nin no 20-dai no shashin (25人の20代の写真) / Works by 25 Photographers in their 20s. Takane, Yamanashi: Kiyosato Museum of Photographic Arts, 1995. Catalogue of an exhibition held at Kiyosato Museum of Photographic Arts in 1995. (in Japanese and English) Parallel text in Japanese and English.
- "Sengo bunka no kiseki 1945–1995" (戦後文化の軌跡1945–1995) / "Japanese Culture: The 50 Postwar Years". Tokyo: Asahi Shinbunsha, 1995. ISBN 4-02-258599-4. Catalogue of the exhibition at Meguro Museum of Art, Tokyo, and elsewhere.
- With Gōzō Yoshimasu (吉増剛造). Warera no emono wa itteki no hikari (我らの獲物は一滴の光). Photographers' Gallery File 2. Tokyo: Photographers' Gallery, 2003. (in Japanese) (Note: The publisher's page about Warera no emono wa itteki no hikari is here.)
- Unasera di Tōkyō: Anohi anotokio: Zanzō no Tōkyō monogatari 1935–1992 (ウナセラ・ディ・トーキョー anohi anotokio 残像の東京物語1935～1992). Tokyo: Setagaya Museum of Art, 2005.
- Shigeyuki Toshima (豊島重之), ed. Meganeura 2005 (メガネウラ 2005) / ICANOF Media Art Show 2005 "Meganeura". ICANOF catalogue 5. ISBN 4-903301-00-1.

=== On Takanashi ===
- Shikku suru shashinka: Takanashi Yutaka 'hōhōron' no kanata e, ten (疾駆する写真家高梨豊〈方法論〉の彼方ヘ、展). Taimutoneru (タイムトンネル) 3. Tokyo: Guardian Garden, 1996. (in Japanese) Discusses works from Somethin' Else to Genius Loci.
- Takanashi Yutaka (高梨豊) / Takanashi Yutaka. Nihon no Shashinka 35. Tokyo: Iwanami, 1998. ISBN 4-00-008375-9. (in Japanese) A survey of Takanashi's work in black and white, with 48 plates.
- Tōkyō Zōkei Daigaku taishoku kinen shashin-kōza-ten: Takanashi Yutaka "Shashin, hito ni yotte" (東京造形大学退職記念写真講座展 高梨豊「写真、人によって」). Tokyo: Tokyo Zokei University, 2000.
- Hikari no fīrudonōto (光のフィールドノート) / Field Notes of Light. Tokyo: National Museum of Modern Art, Tokyo, 2009. (in Japanese and English)
