= Raika Dōmei =

Trio of Japanese photographers

Raika Dōmei (ライカ同盟; meaning "Leica Alliance") is a group of three Japanese photographers and their associates who worked together on exhibitions and books from 1992 until 2009 or a little later. (Note: There was a 24 January 2009 symposium by and about Raika Dōmei. Its domain name, raikadomei.jp, was functioning as its website as late as 28 December 2009, but by 25 August 2011 was being used to advertise diet pills. (The Wayback Machine did not archive the website between these dates.))

== History and concept ==
In 1992, the artist, novelist and old-camera enthusiast Genpei Akasegawa, the artist Yūtokutaishi Akiyama, and the photographer Yutaka Takanashi met at the opening party of an exhibition by the singer Anri Sugano (アンリ菅野) and found that they had happened to bring along a Leica M3, M2 and M4 respectively. They found that they shared an enjoyment of mechanical cameras and also enjoyed walking around the streets taking photographs together. From that time until 2009 or thereabouts they walked around Nagoya, Hakata, Paris, Mie, and Tokyo; and exhibited and published the results.

Planned in early 2009 were photographs of Kurashiki (Okayama).

The three said that they hoped their photography would preserve the individuality of the photographer, and that it would appeal not just to enthusiasts of Leica and other mechanical cameras but rather to all.

Akasegawa published an essay, "Raika Dōmei", about the group.

The three had no rigid allegiance to the Leica brand, or even avoidance of electronics: each photograph in the book Tokyo Kaleidoscope, for example, is annotated with a mention of the camera and lens used; the photographs by Akasegawa use a variety of cameras (including the Contax G2), and many of those by Takanashi use a Hexar RF.

== Exhibitions ==
All the exhibitions listed here were by the three photographers as a group.

- "Raika Dōmei happyōkai" (ライカ同盟発表会). Hokushin Garō (Tokyo), 1994.
- "Nagoya o toru" (名古屋を撮る). Art Gallery C-Square, Chukyo University (Nagoya), June–July 1996.
- "Honchō yorigasumi" (本朝ヨリガスミ). Konica Plaza (Tokyo), 1996.
- "Sanjūshi (三重視). Art Gallery C-Square, Chukyo University (Nagoya), June–July 1998.
- "Kyū-Kyōbashi-ku Raika-chō-ten" (旧京橋區ライカ町展). Inax Gallery 2 (Kyōbashi, Tokyo), January 1999.
- "Pari kaihō" (パリ開放). Art Gallery C-Square, Chukyo University (Nagoya), April 2000.
- "Hakata raishū" (博多来襲). Mitsubishi Jisho Artium (Fukuoka), February–March 2001.
- "Tōkyō kareidosukōpu" (東京涸井戸鏡). Art Gallery C-Square, Chukyo University (Nagoya), September–October 2002.
- "Ra-haikai Tōkyō-hen" (ラ・徘徊 東京編). Library gallery, Musashino Art University (Kodaira, Tokyo), June–July 2003.
- "Ra-haikai etosetora" (ラ・徘徊 ヱ都セトラ). Art Gallery C-Square, Chukyo University (Nagoya), October–November 2004.
- "Endoresu Nagoya" (エンドレス名古屋). Art Gallery C-Square, Chukyo University (Nagoya), September–October 2006.
- "Hakata yamamori" (博多山盛り). Gallery-58 (Ginza, Tokyo), March 2007.

== Akasegawa's essay ==
- Katsuhiko Otsuji (尾辻克彦, i.e. Genpei Akasegawa). Raika Dōmei (ライカ同盟). Tokyo: Kōdansha, 1994. ISBN 4-06-207215-7. (in Japanese) The title piece of what's billed as a collection of shōsetsu (stories) is about the Dōmei.
- Genpei Akasegawa. Raika Dōmei (ライカ同盟). Chikuma Bunko. Tokyo: Chikuma Shobō, 1999. ISBN 4-480-03481-1. (in Japanese) A bunkobon reprint, this time attributed to the author's better known pseudonym.

== Books by the Dōmei ==
All the books listed below are by the three photographers as a group.

- Raika Dōmei: Nagoya shageki! (ライカ同盟 Nagoya 大写撃!). Nagoya: Fūbaisha, 1996. ISBN 4-8331-3088-2. (in Japanese) Photographs of Nagoya.
- Raika Dōmei: Pari kaihō (ライカ同盟 パリ開放). Tokyo: Alpha-beta, 2001. ISBN 4-87198-473-7. (in Japanese) Photographs of Paris.
- Tōkyō kareidosukōpu: Raika Dōmei (東京涸井戸鏡 ライカ同盟) / Tokyo Kaleidoscope. Tokyo: Alpha-beta, 2002. ISBN 4-87198-530-X. (in Japanese) Photographs of Tokyo.
