= Chūgoku Photographers Group =

The Chūgoku Photographers Group (中国写真家集団) was founded in 1937 by amateur photographers from Okayama, Hiroshima, and Tottori with Ryōsuke Ishizu serving as its de facto leader. Founding members included Shōji Ueda, Kunio Masaoka, Akira Nomura while Yōichi Midorikawa joined several years later. As the New Photography movement of the early 1930s declined, the association developed a distinctive regional practice rooted in the landscapes of western Japan. Through the promotion of ‘local color,’ the group gained national recognition through magazine coverage and four exhibitions held in Tokyo between 1937 and 1940.

Although the group’s activities diminished under wartime restrictions from 1941, and ultimately dissolved after several members were killed or injured during the war, the group played an important role in shaping the careers of its members. It was during his time as a member of the Chūgoku Photographers Group that Shoji Ueda developed the staged photographic approach for which he later become renowned, placing figures against the expansive backdrop of the Tottori Sand Dunes. Yoichi Midorikawa likewise turned his attention to the landscapes, people, and customs of western Japan. This localized approach would later culminate in his highly distinctive seascapes of the Seto Inland Sea for which he became best known for.
