= Hatsutarō Horiuchi =

Japanese photographer

Hatsutarō Horiuchi (堀内 初太郎, Horiuchi Hatsutarō; 1909–1986) was a Japanese photographer.
