= List of cultural properties of Japan – paintings (Yamaguchi) =

This list is of the cultural properties of Japan designated in the category of paintings (絵画, kaiga) for the Prefecture of Yamaguchi.

== National Cultural Properties ==
As of 1 July 2019, thirteen Important Cultural Properties (including one *National Treasure) have been designated, being of national significance.

Property	Date	Municipality	Ownership	Comments	Image	Dimensions	Coordinates	Ref.
*Landscapes of the four seasons, ink and light colour on paper, by Sesshū 紙本墨画淡彩四季山水図 雪舟筆 shihon bokuga tansai shiki sansui zu Sesshū hitsu	1486	Hōfu	Hōfu Mōri Hōkōkai (防府毛利報公会) (kept at the Mōri Museum)	also known as Sesshū's Long Landscape Scroll (山水長巻)		15.9 metres (52 ft 2 in) by 37 centimetres (1 ft 3 in)	34°03′48″N 131°35′18″E	
Vimalakirti, colour on silk 絹本著色維摩居士像 kenpon chakushoku Yuima Koji zō	Yuan	Yamaguchi	Tōshun-ji (洞春寺)			156 centimetres (61 in) by 105 centimetres (41 in)	34°11′17″N 131°28′16″E	
Twelve Deva Mandala, colour on silk 絹本著色十二天曼荼羅図〈／（寺伝安鎮曼荼羅）〉 kenpon chakushoku jūni ten mandara zu	Kamakura period	Shimonoseki	Kokubun-ji (国分寺)	traditionally identified by the temple as the Anchin Mandala		172.7 centimetres (68.0 in) by 130.3 centimetres (51.3 in)	33°57′25″N 130°56′24″E	
Spring and Winter Landscapes, colour on silk, by Tai Bunshin 絹本著色春冬山水図〈載文進筆／〉 kenpon chakushoku shuntō sansui zu (Tai Bunshin hitsu)	Ming	Hagi	Kikuya Family Residence Preservation Society (菊屋家住宅保存会)	pair of scrolls		144.5 centimetres (56.9 in) by 79.1 centimetres (31.1 in)	34°24′46″N 131°23′37″E	
Sutra of the Benevolent Kings Mandala, colour on silk 絹本著色仁王経曼荼羅図 kenpon chakushoku ninno-kyō mandara zu	Kamakura period	Yamaguchi	Jinjō-ji (神上寺) (kept at Yamaguchi Prefectural Museum)	the Jōdo-ji (浄土寺) painting is thought to be a copy		148.0 centimetres (58.3 in) by 118.3 centimetres (46.6 in)	34°10′57″N 131°28′22″E	
Sue Hiromori, colour on silk 絹本著色陶弘護像 kenpon chakushoku Sue Hiromori zō	1484	Shūnan	Ryūhō-ji (竜豊寺)	attributed to Sesshū		80.5 centimetres (31.7 in) by 38.2 centimetres (15.0 in)	34°08′22″N 131°48′18″E	
Mōri Motonari, colour on silk 絹本著色毛利元就像 kenpon chakushoku Mōri Motonari zō	1596	Shūnan	Toyosaka Jinja (豊榮神社)			97.0 centimetres (38.2 in) by 49.8 centimetres (19.6 in)	34°11′19″N 131°28′51″E	
Mōri Motonari, colour on silk 絹本著色毛利元就像 kenpon chakushoku Mōri Motonari zō	1591	Hōfu	Mōri Museum			91 centimetres (36 in) by 44 centimetres (17 in)	34°03′48″N 131°35′18″E	
Oxherd after Li Tang, light colour on paper, by Sesshū 紙本淡彩放牛図〈雪舟筆／（仿李唐）〉 shihon tansai hōgyū zu (Sesshū hitsu)	Muromachi period	Yamaguchi	Yamaguchi Prefectural Museum of Art			31.5 centimetres (12.4 in) by 33.5 centimetres (13.2 in)	34°10′46″N 131°28′28″E	
Oxherd after Li Tang, light colour on paper, by Sesshū 紙本淡彩放牛図〈雪舟筆／（仿李唐）〉 shihon tansai hōgyū zu (Sesshū hitsu)	Muromachi period	Yamaguchi	Yamaguchi Prefectural Museum of Art			31.5 centimetres (12.4 in) by 33.5 centimetres (13.2 in)	34°10′46″N 131°28′28″E	
Matsuzaki Tenjin Engi, colour on paper 紙本著色松崎天神縁起〈箱入／〉 shihon chakushoku Matsuzaki Tenjin engi	1311	Hōfu	Hōfu Tenman-gū	six scrolls; designation includes storage cases		33.6 centimetres (13.2 in) by 8.6 metres (28 ft 3 in) to 14.3 metres (46 ft 11 in)	34°03′48″N 131°34′27″E	
Landscape, ink on paper, by Sesshū 紙本墨画山水図〈雪舟筆／〉 shihon tansai hōgyū zu (Sesshū hitsu)	1474	Yamaguchi	Yamaguchi Prefectural Museum of Art			23.2 centimetres (9.1 in) by 157.3 centimetres (61.9 in)	34°10′46″N 131°28′28″E	
Tenjin, ink on paper 紙本墨画天神図 shihon bokuga Tenjin zu	1429	Yamaguchi	Furukuma Jinja (古熊神社)			108.0 centimetres (42.5 in) by 37.5 centimetres (14.8 in)	34°10′43″N 131°29′19″E	

== Prefectural Cultural Properties ==
As of 1 May 2019, twenty-nine properties have been designated at a prefectural level.

Property	Date	Municipality	Ownership	Comments	Image	Dimensions	Coordinates	Ref.
Diagram of the Star Mansion 星宿図 (寺伝須弥山図) seishuku zu (tera-den Shumi-sen zu)	Kamakura period	Kudamatsu	Tamon-in (多聞院)	three-dimensional object made of hinoki; traditionally identified by the temple as Mount Meru		48.1 centimetres (18.9 in)	34°02′26″N 131°53′33″E	
Seated Willow Kannon, colour on silk 絹本着色楊柳観音坐像 kenpon chakushoku Yōryū Kannon zazō	late Goryeo	Shimonoseki	Kōzan-ji	Goryeo Buddhist painting		146.9 centimetres (57.8 in) by 85.8 centimetres (33.8 in)	33°59′44″N 130°58′56″E	
Occidental Landscape and Nagasaki Harbour, glass painting ガラス絵泰西風景図・長崎港図 garasu-e taisei fūkei zu・Nagasaki-kō zu	Edo period	Yamaguchi	Hanao Hachimangū (花尾八幡宮)			51.3 centimetres (20.2 in) by 61.9 centimetres (24.4 in) and 50.2 centimetres (19.8 in) by 62.0 centimetres (24.4 in)	34°09′51″N 131°42′00″E	
Sesshū Tōyō, ink and light colour on silk, by Unkoku Tōeki 絹本墨画淡彩雪舟等楊像(雲谷等益筆) kenpon bokuga tansai Sesshū Tōyō zō	early Edo period	Yamaguchi	Jōei-ji (常栄寺)			104.9 centimetres (41.3 in) by 34.2 centimetres (13.5 in)	34°11′53″N 131°29′23″E	
Zengan Tōjūn Oshō, colour on silk 絹本着色全岩東純和尚像 kenpon chakushoku Zengan Tōjūn oshō zō	Muromachi period	Yamaguchi	Rurikō-ji (瑠璃光寺) (kept at Yamaguchi Prefectural Museum)	attributed to Sesshū		82.5 centimetres (32.5 in) by 36.8 centimetres (14.5 in)	34°10′57″N 131°28′22″E	
Lakeside Pavilion Spring View, ink and light colour on paper 紙本墨画淡彩湖亭春望図 shihon bokuga tansai kotei shunbō zu	Muromachi period	Iwakuni	Kikkawa Historical Museum (吉川史料館)			84 centimetres (33 in) by 36 centimetres (14 in)	34°10′14″N 132°10′39″E	
Shaka Triad, colour on silk 絹本着色釈迦三尊像 shihon bokuga tansai kotei shunbō zu	late Muromachi period	Hagi	Tōkō-ji (東光寺)	three scrolls		97 centimetres (38 in) by 47.2 centimetres (18.6 in)	34°24′47″N 131°25′33″E	
Kumano Honchi Butsu Mandala, colour on silk 絹本着色熊野本地仏曼荼羅図 付 納箱 kenpon chakushoku Kumano honchi butsu mandara zu tsuketari osame-bako	Kamakura period/Nanboku-chō period	Hōfu	Suō Kokubun-ji (周防国分寺)	designation includes storage case		139.5 centimetres (54.9 in) by 70.0 centimetres (27.6 in)	34°03′45″N 131°34′47″E	
Buddha's Parinirvana, colour on silk 絹本着色仏涅槃図 kenpon chakushoku Butsu nehan zu	early C15	Hōfu	Suō Kokubun-ji (周防国分寺)			148.2 centimetres (58.3 in) by 90.2 centimetres (35.5 in)	34°03′45″N 131°34′47″E	

== See also ==
- Cultural Properties of Japan
- List of National Treasures of Japan (paintings)
- Japanese painting
- List of Historic Sites of Japan (Yamaguchi)
