= Shimonoseki City Archaeological Museum =

- 下関市立考古博物館
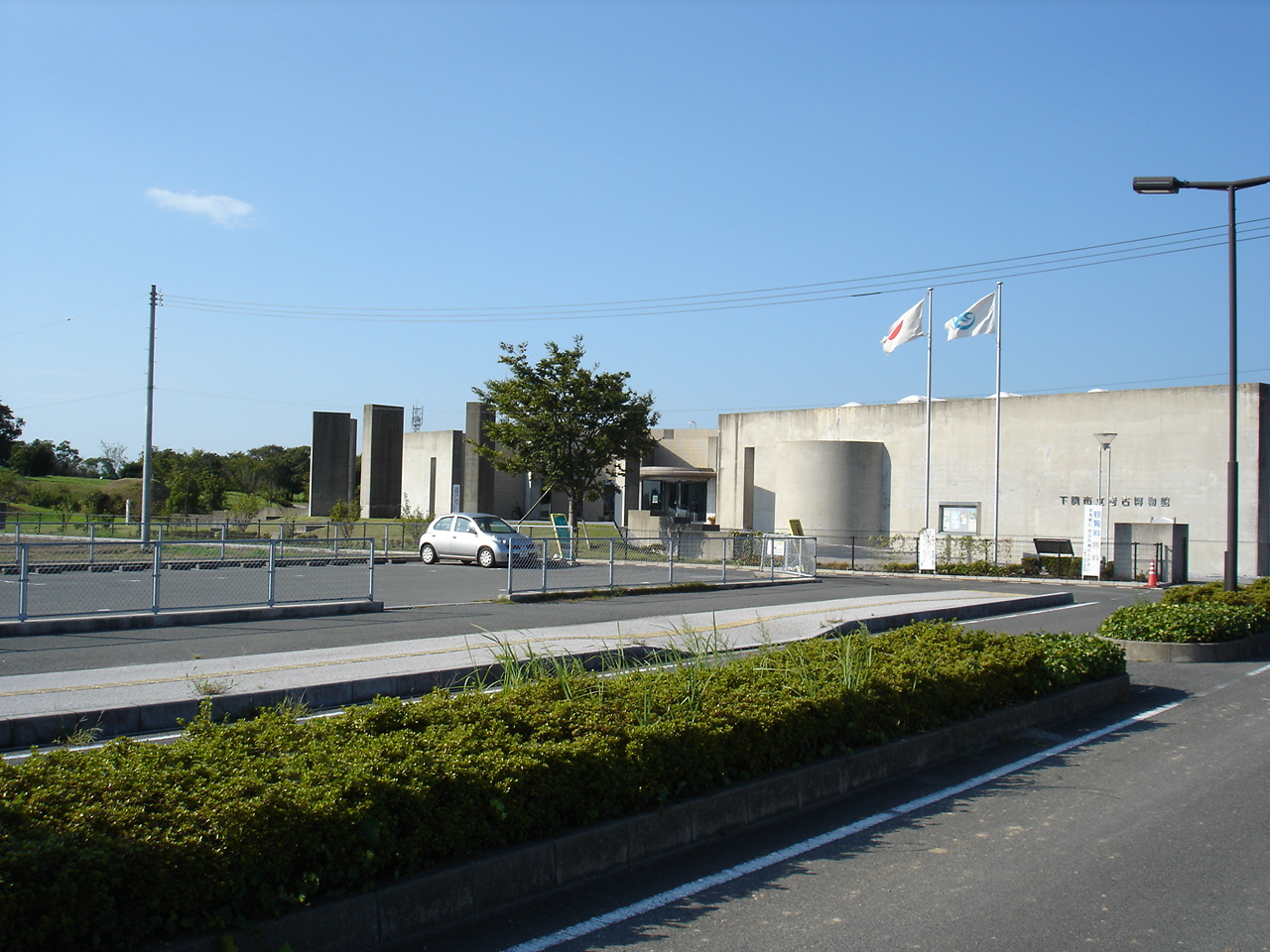
- Interactive map of the Shimonoseki City Archaeological Museum area

General information
- Location: 454 Ayaragi, Shimonoseki, Yamaguchi Prefecture, Japan
- Coordinates: 34°0′41″N 130°55′34″E
- Opened: 1995

Website
- homepage (jp)

Shimonoseki City Archaeological Museum (下関市立考古博物館, Shimonoseki Shiritsu Kōko-hakubutsukan) opened in Shimonoseki, Yamaguchi Prefecture, Japan, in 1995. It is located next to the Ayaragigō Site, a Yayoi settlement that has been designated a national Historic Site.

== See also ==
- List of Historic Sites of Japan (Yamaguchi)
- Yamaguchi Prefectural Museum
