= Osaka Contemporary Art Center =

Prefectural art museum in Japan

Coordinates: 34°41′03″N 135°31′06″E

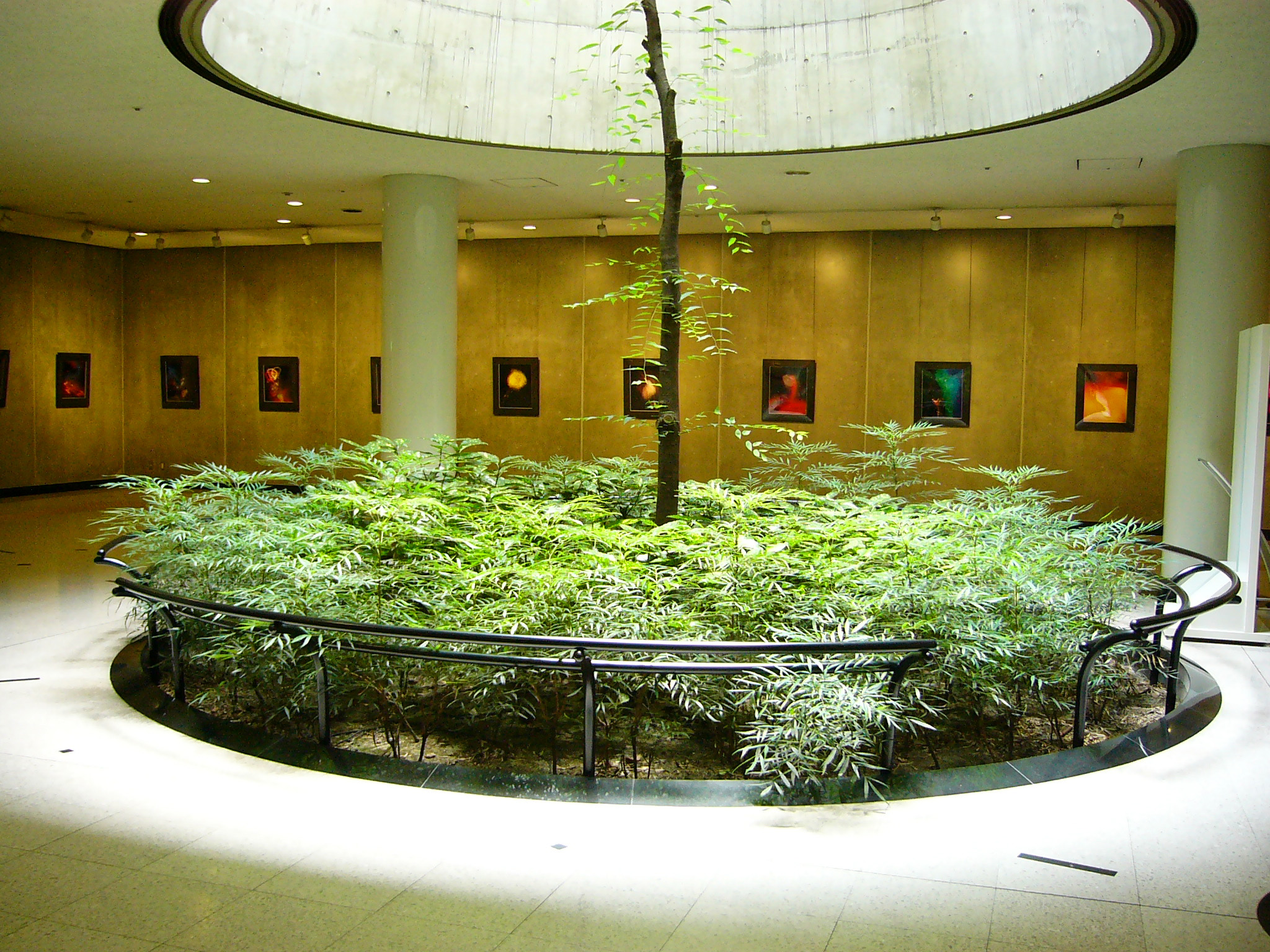
Osaka Contemporary Art Center

The Osaka Contemporary Art Center (大阪府立現代美術センター, Ōsaka furitsu gendai bijutsu sentā) is an art gallery in Osaka, Japan, administered by Osaka Prefecture.

The center started in 1974 as Ōsaka Fumin Gyararī (大阪府民ギャラリー). In 1980 its Japanese name was changed to that used today, on the occasion of its move within Kita-ku (Osaka) from Dōjima to Nakanoshima. In 2000 it moved to Chūō-ku.

The Center has a permanent collection and also holds exhibitions. Its address is Ōtemae 3-1-43, Chūō-ku, Osaka City, postcode 540-0008.
