= Museum Act (Japan) =

Japanese law relating to museums

Museum Act 博物館法 Hakubutsukan Hō
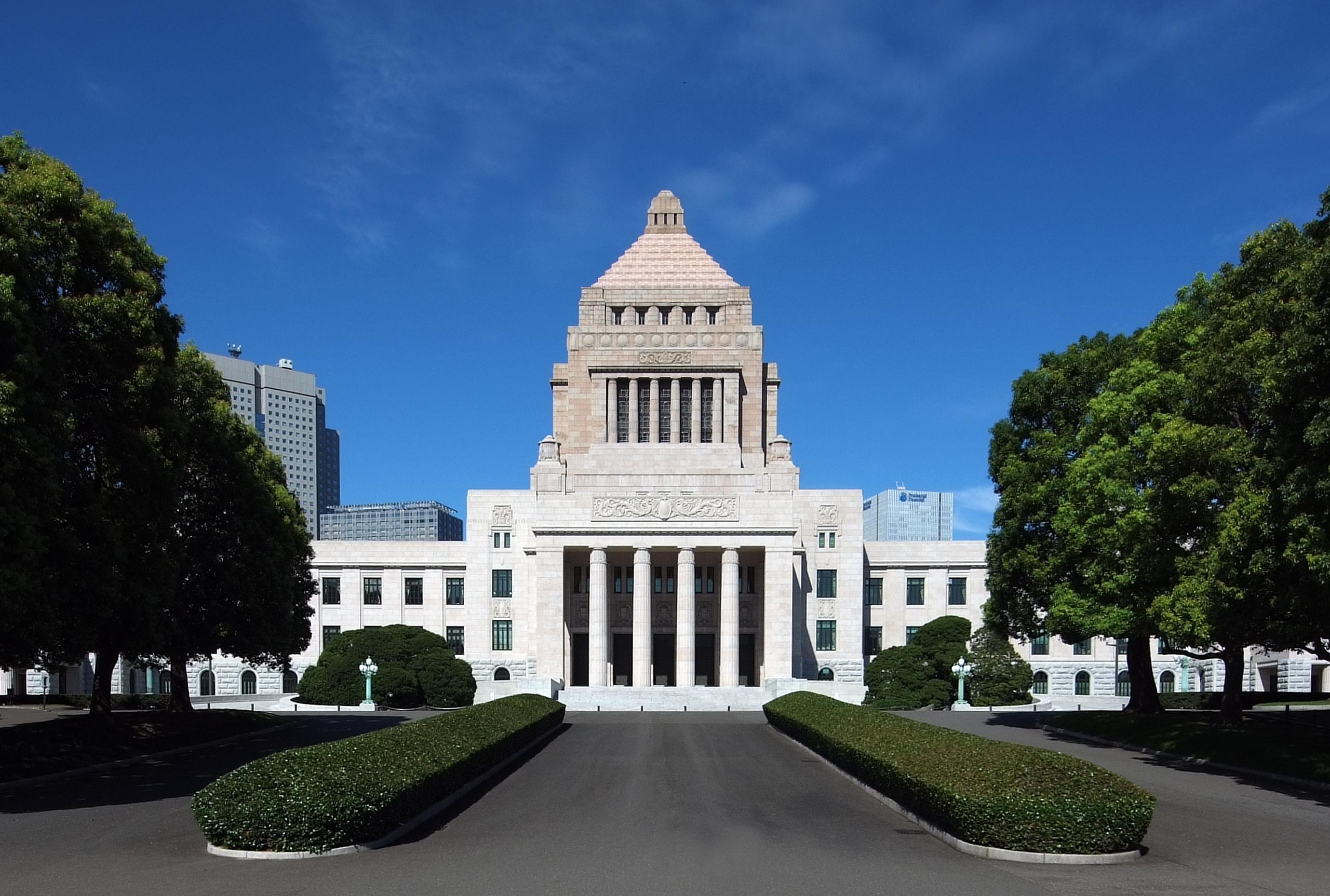
- National Diet Building

Diet of Japan
- Territorial extent: Japan
- Enacted: 1951
- Effective: 1952

Amended by
- Last amended in 2008

Related legislation
- Fundamental Act of Education; Social Education Act (ja); National Institutes for Cultural Heritage Act (独立行政法人国立文化財機構法); Library Act (ja); Enforcement Regulations of the Museum Act (博物館法施行規則); Favourable Standards Relating to the Establishment and Operation of Public Museums (公立博物館の設置及び運営上の望ましい基準)
- Status: In force

The Museum Act (博物館法, Hakubutsukan Hō) is a Japanese law covering matters relating to the country's museums. The law was passed as Law No. 285 in 1951 and was last amended in 2022.

== Summary ==
The Act distinguishes between public museums (公立博物館), being those established by local governments, and private museums (私立博物館), those established by incorporated associations and foundations or by juridical religious and other persons; as such those established by the state or an Independent Administrative Institution (such as the Tokyo, Kyoto, Nara, and Kyushu National Museums of the IAI National Institutes for Cultural Heritage) cannot become registered museums (登録博物館), but may be designated museum-equivalent facilities (博物館相当施設). Facilities that engage in similar activities but are neither registered or designated have no restrictions or conditions imposed by the Act; these are defined elsewhere as museum-like facilities (博物館類似施設). Article 2 defines museums as facilities that collect, store, research, and utilize materials on history, art, folkways, industry, and the natural sciences; as such, various types of "museum" are provided for, including botanical gardens, zoos, aquaria, and planetaria.

As of October 2018, there were 5,738 museums in Japan: 914 registered museums, 372 museum-equivalent facilities, and 4,452 museum-like facilities.

== Articles ==
The Museum Act has 29 Articles:

Chapter 1—General Provisions (Articles 1–9)

- 1. Purpose of Act
- 2. Definition of museums
- 3. Activities conducted by museums
- 4–7. Directors, curators, qualifications, training
- 8–9. Standards and evaluation

Chapter 2—Registration (Articles 10–17)

- 10. Registration
- 11. Application
- 12. Examination
- 13. Amendment
- 14. Cancellation
- 15. Abolition of museums
- 16. Prefectural regulations
- 17. deleted

Chapter 3—Public Museums (Articles 18–26)

- 18. Establishment
- 19. Jurisdiction (governed by the local board of education)
- 20–22. Museum councils
- 23. Admission fees
- 24,26. Subsidies
- 25. deleted

Chapter 4—Private Museums (Articles 27–28)

- 27. Relationship with prefectural boards of education
- 28. Relationship with central and local governments

Chapter 5—Other Provisions (Article 29)

- 29. Facilities equivalent to museums

Supplementary Provisions

== See also ==
- 1950 Law for the Protection of Cultural Properties
- Independent Administrative Institution National Institute for Cultural Heritage
- Prefectural museum
- List of museums in Japan
- Japanese Association of Museums (日本博物館協会) (JAM)
