= Yamaguchi Prefectural Museum =

- 山口県立山口博物館
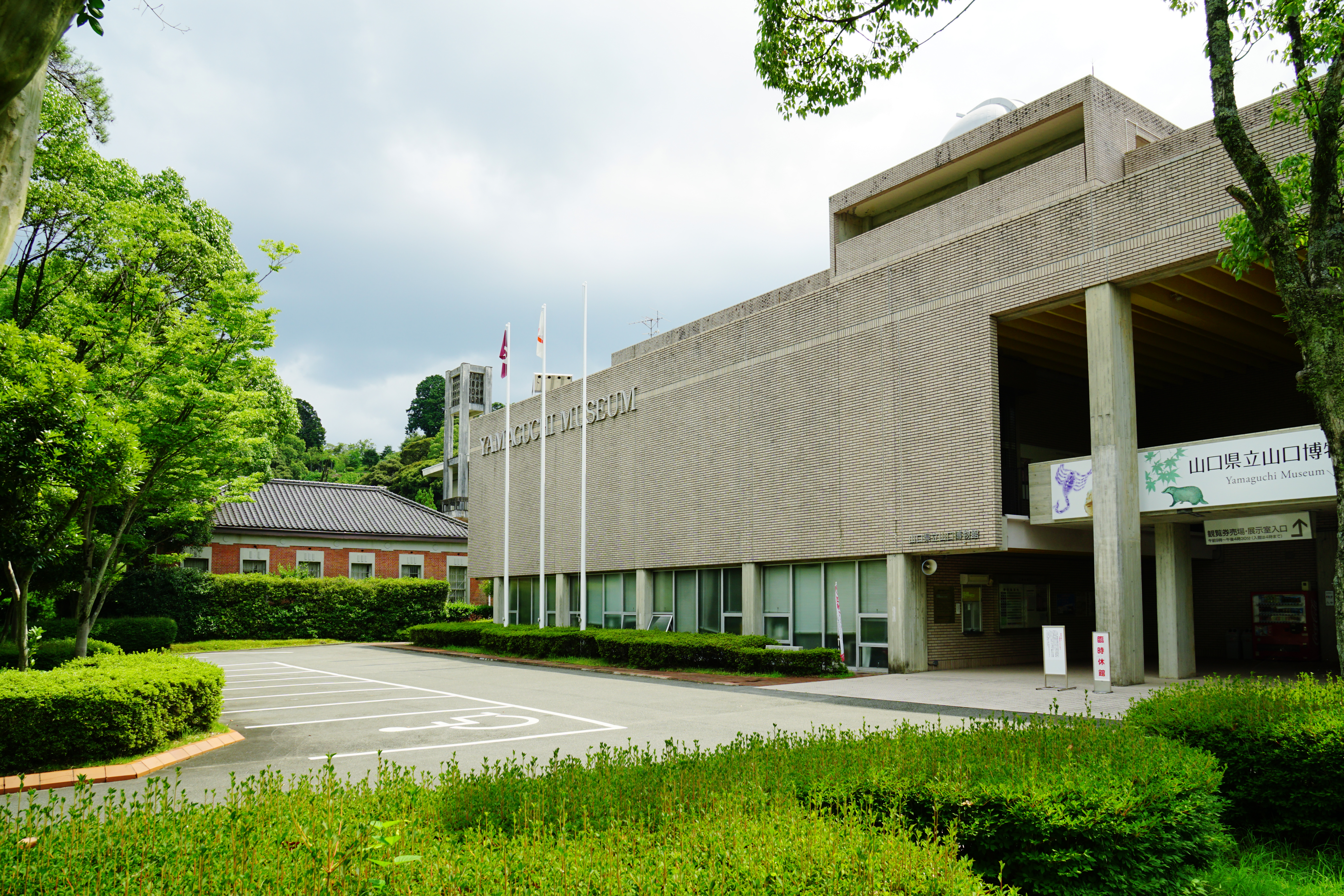
- Interactive map of the Yamaguchi Prefectural Museum area

General information
- Location: 8-2 Kasuga-chō, Yamaguchi, Yamaguchi Prefecture, Japan
- Coordinates: 34°10′57″N 131°28′22″E
- Opened: 1912

Website
- homepage

Yamaguchi Prefectural Museum (山口県立山口博物館, Yamaguchi Kenritsu Yamaguchi Hakubutsukan) is a prefectural museum in Yamaguchi, Japan, dedicated to the natural history and history of Yamaguchi Prefecture. It also has displays relating to science, technology, and astronomy. The museum opened as the Bōchō Educational Museum in 1912 and moved to its present location in 1917, reopening as the Yamaguchi Prefectural Educational Museum. The current building dates to 1967. The museum celebrated its one hundredth anniversary in 2012.

== See also ==
- List of Historic Sites of Japan (Yamaguchi)
- Yamaguchi Prefectural Art Museum
- Suō Province
- Nagato Province
