= Yamaguchi Prefectural Museum of Art =

Art museum in Japan

Coordinates: 34.179510°N 131.474461°E

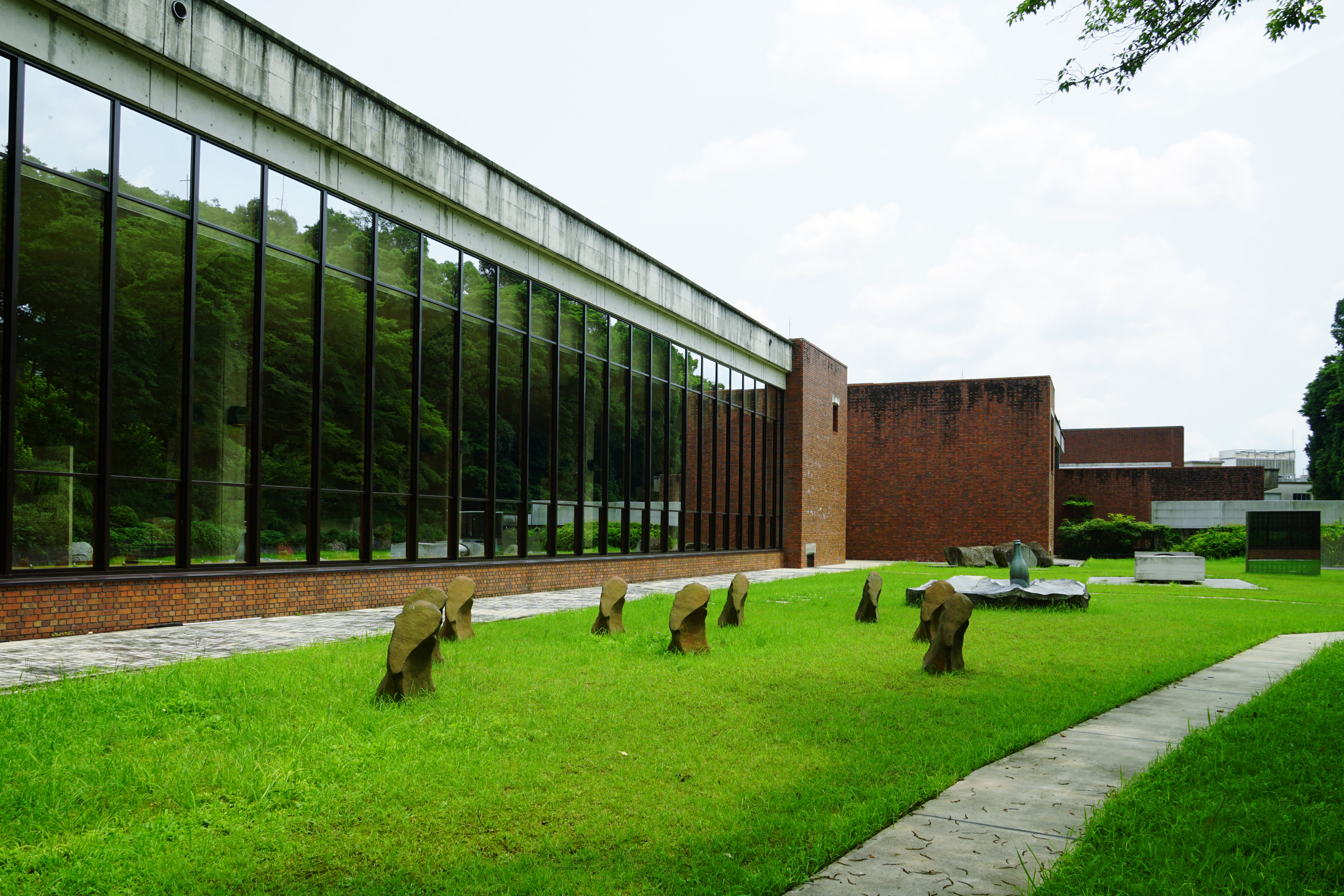
Yamaguchi Prefectural Art Museum in 2014.

Yamaguchi Prefectural Museum of Art (山口県立美術館, Yamaguchi Kenritsu Bijutsukan), in Yamaguchi City is the main art gallery of Yamaguchi Prefecture, Japan.

Opened in 1979, the gallery has a permanent collection, part of which is exhibited at any one time, and also hosts special exhibitions.

The gallery's photographic collection includes an extensive collection of the works of Katsuji Fukuda. Its major photographic exhibitions have included three that showed work after the war: in 1989, an exhibition of eleven photographers of 1965–75; in 1990, of twelve photographers of 1945–55; and in 1991, of eleven photographers of 1955–65. The permanent photographic collection includes works by Hisae Imai, Takeji Iwamiya, Yutaka Takanashi, and Toyoko Tokiwa.

The museum is at Kameyama-chō 3–1, Yamaguchi-shi.
