= Seiki no Kai =

Japanese art collective (1947–1951)

Seiki no Kai (世紀の会, The Century Society) was an influential art research and discussion group briefly active in early postwar Japan, from 1947 to 1951. It was established and led primarily by the author Kōbō Abe, and focused on cultural collaboration between its members, all of whom were artists, writers, or critics in their twenties. Because there were few opportunities for young people to publish or exhibit their work in these years, the group primarily focused on organizing lectures and discussion groups on relevant cultural topics – or as they phrased it, "20-something culture by 20-somethings, for 20-somethings." The group was influenced by two senior members, painter Tarō Okamoto, who was interested in Surrealism, and the avant-garde critic Kiyoteru Hanada, whose discourse engaged Marxism, along with the founder Kōbō Abe, who was steeped in existentialism. As a result, most of the group's events investigated topics related to these ideas.

In the later years of the group, members were increasingly influenced by the concept of sōgō geijutsu ("total art"), or multimedia works produced through collective action. They produced several low-cost collaborative publications with limited distribution. The group eventually split up when Abe and others opted to join the Japanese Communist Party and pursue more active involvement in the political sphere. Despite only being active for a few years, the group was nonetheless a key educational source and meeting point for young creative people in Japan, especially at a time when there were few resources available. It is commonly thought to be a precursor to later avant-garde artistic collaborations and collectives in Japan.

== History ==
=== Early years (1947–1948) ===
Seiki no Kai was founded in 1947 by the author Kōbō Abe and a group of his classmates from the literature department at the University of Tokyo, all of whom were in their early 20s. Their initial group name was Nijudai Bungakusha no Kai / Seiki (二十代文学者の会・世紀, "Association of Literary Scholars / Century"). Its earliest members from 1947 to 1948 included, in addition to Abe: Momo Iida, Tetsurō Morimoto, Tōru Ogawa, Hiroshi Hidaka, Yasuo Nakano, Minoru Tsubaki, Rintarō Endō, Yukio Mishima, Ichirō Hariu, Hiroshi Akutagawa, Kōji Nakada, Minoru Nakamura, Takashi Tatsuno, Takayuki Kiyooka, Tsuneo Watanabe, Shin'ichi Segi, and Kyōsuke Masaki. Many of these early members would go on to become accomplished authors and critics.

Although the initial goal of the group was unclear, its first iteration appears to have been fairly casual and meetings involved the discussion and research of literature.

=== Reorganization (1948–1950) ===
By 1948, Momo Iida and several group members had split off into a different group that published the periodical Sedai (世代, "Generation"). The remaining members began to participate in meetings of the newly inaugurated avant-garde collective Yoru no Kai. Around this time, author Hiroshi Sekine connected with Abe. Together, Abe and Sekine decided to rebrand the group with the simple name Seiki no Kai ("Century Group"). Until recently, it was commonly believed that Seiki no Kai was an offshoot of Yoru no Kai, but as former group member Shin'ichi Segi explains, their origins were completely different. Interactions with Yoru no Kai did, however, help shape the direction of Seiki no Kai.

Beginning in 1948, Seiki no Kai group members met in an open university classrooms around Tokyo on Saturday afternoons to research and discuss topics in literature, and began publishing essays in their journal Seiki no Kai Nyūsu (世紀ニュース, "Seiki News"). Their 1948 Commemorative Presentation Meeting included over 300 participants, with speeches from Tarō Okamoto and Kiyoteru Hanada, among others. By this point, many new members had joined, including the poet Hiroshi Noma and author Yasuo Nakano.

Following the dissolution of Yoru no Kai in 1949, prominent members of Yoru no Kai, including Okamoto and Hanada, also formally joined Seiki no Kai. Around this time, inspired by Okamoto and Hanada, the group began to expand its focus from literature to art, hosting lectures on avant-garde art, and inaugurating a painting division. The painting division included new artist members Hiroshi Katsuragawa, Shōzō Kitadai, Katsuhiro Yamaguchi, Hideko Fukushima, and Tatsuo Ikeda. The painting division launched research groups, lectures, and an art-focused publication Gashū (画集, "Collection of Pictures"). Topics covered in research groups and lectures included Picasso, Surrealism, technology and the arts, and avant-garde art. Many Seiki no Kai artists also exhibited their works in larger venues, including the early iterations of the Yomiuri Indépendant Exhibition.

Seiki no Kai also continued to host regular lectures and research groups on literature and poetry, in which many of the new artists members also participated. Topics covered in these meetings included: Franz Kafka and Jean-Paul Sartre, avant-garde poetry, documentary literature, and Karl Marx and Max Weber.

=== Later years (1950–1951) ===
By 1950, the filmmaker Hiroshi Teshigahara had joined the group. The same year, Okamoto read his declaration of Polar Opposites at the 2nd Yomiuri Indépendant in 1950, and demanded that members of Seiki no Kai join his new group, Taikyokushugi Bijutsu Kyōkai (対極主義美術協会, "Polar Opposite Art Association"). Although most of the Seiki no Kai artists respected his theory, they did not wish to join a group dedicated to it. Thereafter, Okamoto split with the Seiki no Kai and never participated in group activities again.

Perhaps instigated by Okamoto's demands, soon after the incident at the Yomiuri Indépendant, a confrontation occurred between some of the leading figures of Seiki no Kai. The artists felt that the group was guided too strongly by the literature faction, and after the argument, most of the artists left the group. The few artists that remained decided to refocus their energy on creating works with their fellow Seiki no Kai members, rather than discussing theory. Thereafter, the group published a number of collaborative books and journals, beginning with the periodical BEK (meaning Seiki no Kai, or Century in Russian). Teshigahara became a much more prominent member of the group, offering his own home as a publishing venue for the group. Around the same time, Teshigahara's father, Sōfū Teshigahara, the head of the Sōgetsu ikebana school, permitted Hiroshi to take over editing the ikebana periodical Sōgetsu. Hiroshi began including the works of many Seiki no Kai members, including Abe, and Sōgetsu became a highly interdisciplinary periodical that, in addition to ikebana, included articles on literature, film, and art. It is an important record of some of the work produced by Seiki no Kai members during this time.

Seiki no Kai dissolved in May 1951 due primarily to the increasingly Communist-leaning beliefs of Abe and the core members. Katsuragawa explained that, following their successful collaborative publications, they felt there was nothing left for their group to do. Their dissolution manifesto quoted Abe, who said that "the essence of the avant-garde is in the masses and in the denial of the self." Abe, Teshigahara, Ikeda, and Katsuragawa immediately formed the Jinmin Geijutsu Shūdan (人民芸術集団, "People's Art Group"). Several of the Seiki no Kai members also subsequently joined the Japanese Communist Party.

== Philosophy ==
Seiki no Kai's manifesto was published after the group's reorganization, in the periodical Sōgō Bunka in November 1948. The manifesto declared: "Seiki no Kai is 20-something culture by 20-somethings, for 20-somethings. Seiki no Kai wants to engage in broad collaborative research, so other than the limiting the age, there are no other kinds of requirements for membership." The goals were to focus on discussing and researching new culture in a collaborative environment, which was reflected in its activities.

In 1949, due to the influx of new artists and the influence of Okamoto and Hanada, the goals of Seiki no Kai began to shift: while continuing to focus on new culture, research, and collaboration, they pivoted toward an interest in creating sōgōgeijutsu ("total artworks") that involved the collaboration and input of creators across various media. This new interest was likely spurred by Okamoto and Hanada, who had recently founded the Abangyarudo Geiijutsu Kenkyūkai (Avant-garde Art Study Group) and were attempting an "integration of the arts" (geijutsu no sōgō). The best evidence of Seiki no Kai's interest in sōgōgeijutsu can be found in their publications discussed below, which they called "collaborative works" (kyōdō seisaku).

Throughout the years of Seiki no Kai's activities, the group consistently valued collaboration and democratization of culture—something that is particularly visible in their collaborative publications. In terms of overarching philosophical interests, Seiki no Kai's events consistently engaged with the existentialist literature and philosophy of Franz Kafka and Jean-Paul Sartre, including a dedicated Kafka research group and translations of Kafka's essays. Because Hanada's interest in Marxism and Marxist notions of collective production, and Okamoto's interest in avant-garde art in Surrealism, numerous events were devoted to Marxism, anti-bourgeois philosophy, anti-capitalist ideology, and new developments in art. In many cases, all of these interests intertwined, as is visible in one of Abe's essays published in Seiki no Kai Nyūsu, entitled "Art of the Revolution Requires a Revolution of Art!" In the essay, he proclaimed that "art is chained up, along with the masses."

The subjects discussed and published by Seiki no Kai reveal that the group was always left-leaning, but a growing desire for political praxis rather than simply theoretical discussion, encouraged by Abe's increasing involvement with the Communist party, ultimately contributed to the demise of the group.

== Works ==
Group member Hiroshi Katsuragawa explained that during Seiki no Kai's active years, it was much more common to talk and discuss than to actually create works. The main reason for this was that no one had any money for art supplies. Most members could barely eat. "Talking was free, so even if we had empty bellies we could somehow still talk."

The only preserved collective works of Seiki no Kai are their publications, including their short-lived journals Seiki Nyūsu, BEK, and Seikigun (世紀群 "Century Group"), which was a run of cheaply made, small pamphlets. Numbering seven issues in total, Seikigun is important evidence of the group's interest in sōgōgeijutsu ("total artworks") because it attempts to merge visual art and literature to arrive at a new form of collaborative expression. Similar to Seiki no Kai meetings, the issues were meant to instigate both artistic and political discussion. The pamphlets were primarily black and white with some illustrations including red as an accent color. The design of each issue was different, but included participation and input from multiple group members, thus underscoring their commitment to collaboration and democratization of art. They explained: "every member was allowed to actively make proposals about the design of this pamphlet." Contents of these issues included: translations of Franz Kafka essays by Hanada Kiyoteru, illustrations by Hiroshi Katsuragawa based on group discussion and input, an essay by Segi Shin'ichi on American Abstract Art, essays by be, an essay by Hiroshi Sekine on Vladimir Mayakovsky, and woodblock prints by Hiroshi Teshigahara. The illustrations were created by various different group members, including members who were not artists, and all of them show the strong influence of biomorphic Surrealism. For example, the cover of issue 4 includes a line drawing of an uncanny amalgamation of various distorted body parts resembling a cadavre exquis, with the title of Abe's essay Mahō no chōku ("The Magic Chalk") inscribed inside the face.

== Influence ==
There were many small artistic groups active in the early postwar period in Japan, and among them, Seiki no Kai has been acknowledged as a particularly influential avant-garde art group. Many major authors and critics active in postwar Japan were Seiki no Kai members at the very beginnings of their careers, including Kōbō Abe, Hiroshi Sekine, Hiroshi Noma, and Ichiro Hariu. Likewise, many young artists who would become prominent in the postwar art world participated in Seiki no Kai, including Tatsuo Ikeda, Hiroshi Teshigahara, and Jikken Kōbō members Shōzō Kitadai, Hideko Fukushima, and Katsuhiro Yamaguchi. In a similar manner to the contemporaneous group Yoru no Kai, Seiki no Kai served as an important incubator of ideas, educational organization, and meeting point for young cultural figures in early postwar Japan. And like Yoru no Kai, Seiki no Kai's emphasis on collaborative discussion and creation can also be seen as a precursor to subsequent "activity-based collectivism" that expanded throughout avant-garde art of the 1950s and the 1960s.
