= Sanshin Yoshikawa =

Japanese painter associated with Surrealism in Nagoya (1911–1985)

- 吉川三伸
- Born: 1911; Nagoya, Japan
- Died: 1985 (aged 73–74)
- Occupation: Painter
- Known for: Nagoya Surrealist painting; the Nagoya Avant-Garde Club; Bijutsu Bunka Kyōkai
- Movement: Japanese Surrealism, avant-garde

Sanshin Yoshikawa (吉川三伸, 1911–1985) was a Japanese painter associated with Surrealism and avant-garde art in Nagoya. Active in the city's prewar Surrealist milieu, he helped form the group Avant-Garde and was a founding member of the Nagoya Avant-Garde Club. In 1941, during the wartime repression of Japanese Surrealism, he was detained by the Special Higher Police, and his works and materials were confiscated; he was released in 1942 without indictment. After the war, he continued to work as a painter and later revisited his wartime detention in the Recollection of the Year 1940 series.

== Life and career ==
Yoshikawa was born in Nagoya in 1911. Museum databases identify him as a painter and place him within the Nagoya-based development of prewar Japanese Surrealism.

A 1990 exhibition catalogue published by the Nagoya City Art Museum states that Yoshikawa, together with Tetsu Okada and Togawa Kaneo, was among the young painters who gathered around Yoshio Shimozato's studio in the mid-1930s and, attracted to Surrealist painting, formed the group Avant-Garde in 1936. The same source states that in November 1937 he became a founding member of the Nagoya Avant-Garde Club, a Nagoya collective formed around Shimozato and Chirū Yamanaka that brought together painters, critics, and photographers.

Museum sources further state that the Nagoya Avant-Garde Club split and dissolved in April 1939, after its photography section had separated to form Nagoya Photo Avant-Garde in February of that year. Yoshikawa was active among the club's painters, while Kansuke Yamamoto participated in its photography section and later joined Nagoya Photo Avant-Garde.

After the breakup of the Nagoya Avant-Garde Club, Yoshikawa and other painters including Okada, Togawa, and Oguchi Noboru joined the newly formed Bijutsu Bunka Kyōkai. The 1990 catalogue states that in July 1939 they also formed a new group, 瀝𣵛会, and held its first exhibition. The group's members exhibited at the first Bijutsu Bunka Kyōkai exhibition in 1940, where members received awards. Kariya City Art Museum and the Toyohashi City Museum of Art and History both note that Yoshikawa studied under Ichirō Fukuzawa and was involved in the foundation of Bijutsu Bunka Kyōkai.

== Wartime repression ==
In 1941, when the Surrealism crackdown unfolded on suspicion of violations of the Peace Preservation Law, Yoshikawa was detained by the Special Higher Police, and his works and materials were confiscated. Kariya City Art Museum states that he was released in 1942 without indictment. Nagoya Gallery likewise states that he was held for about ten months at Nagoya's Egawa police station during the crackdown.

Later museum accounts describe this experience as decisive for Yoshikawa's postwar development. The Toyohashi City Museum of Art and History states that he later produced a series drawing on his experience in detention; works in this series include those titled Recollection of the Year 1940.

== Postwar work and legacy ==
After the war, Yoshikawa resumed his career as a painter. Later accounts describe him as developing from prewar Surrealism toward a broader postwar practice while continuing to reflect on war, destruction, and memory.

His work is held by museums including the Nagoya City Art Museum, the Kariya City Art Museum, and the Toyohashi City Museum of Art and History. Art Platform Japan's museum-collections search lists 15 collection records for his work nationwide.

== See also ==
- Nagoya Avant-Garde Club
- Nagoya Photo Avant-Garde
- Surrealism in Japan
- Kansuke Yamamoto (artist)
