= Yoru no Kai =

Art research and discussion group in Japan

Yoru no Kai (夜の会, "Night Society," est. 1947/1948) was a short-lived but highly influential art research and discussion group founded in early postwar Japan by two major theorists, Kiyoteru Hanada and Tarō Okamoto. While Hanada was a literary critic steeped in Marxist theory, Okamoto was an avant-garde artist well versed in Surrealism and ethnography in the mold of Bataille's College of Sociology. The group's tenet centers on its staunch rejection of "old familiar art" and earnest "exploration of a new art," as their manifesto radically called for: "We must destroy everything and create everything." Yoru no Kai offered an early important venue to discuss possible new directions in art and culture through public debates, member meetings, and publications. Although the group members were primarily those in literature, it embraced an interdisciplinary goal, collaborating with the artists collective Seiki no Kai (Century Society) and later recasting itself as Abangyarudo Geijutsu Kenkyūkai (Avant-garde Art Study Group). In doing so, they exerted a significant influence that would be felt into the 1950s, as seen in the emergence of Reportage painters and the formation of Jikken Kōbō.

== Establishment ==
Okamoto and Hanada decided to form Yoru no Kai following the 1947 publication of Hanada's volume, Sakuran no ronri (錯乱の論理 "The Logic of Chaos"), which resonated with Okamoto's own viewpoints. A group assembled by Okamoto and Hanada met for the first time in May 1947 in the basement of a burned out building in Tokyo. They switched meeting locations for the first few sessions, meeting at Hanada's home and at Okamoto's studio in Kaminoge on the outskirts of Tokyo. The name of the group came from a 1947 painting by Okamoto titled Yoru ("Night") that hung on the wall of his studio at the time.

The group was formally inaugurated in January, 1948. In February, they began holding their formal meetings twice a month on Monday nights, at the French restaurant Mon Ami in Nakano, Tokyo, designed by Frank Lloyd Wright.

Early participants were personally selected by Hanada, and at the first meeting they included Hiroshi Noma, Rinzō Shiina, Yutaka Haniya, Haruo Umezaki, Kiichi Sasaki, Hideto Nakano, and Tōzaburō Ono. Later on, Kōbō Abe and Hiroshi Sekine would also join, and many artists and critics would participate. However, besides Okamoto, all of the founding members of Yoru no Kai were figures affiliated with the literary world. Many of them were prominent writers who would become known as the Daiichijisengo-ha Sakka (第一次戦後派作家 "The First Generation of Postwar Writers"). Many of them were also contributing writers for the publication Sōgō Bunka ("Syncretic Culture") that had launched in 1947 and was published by the group Sōgō Bunka Kyōkai ("Association of Syncretic Culture"). Hanada himself had been part of Sōgō Bunka Kyōkai prior to forming Yoru no Kai.

== Philosophy ==
Yoru no Kai edited and published one volume, released in 1949, titled Atarashii Geijutsu no Tankyū (新しい芸術の探究, "Exploration of a New Art"). The volume is a collection of essays and debates by Yoru no Kai members, and reveals the group's goals and philosophy. The introduction is considered by some scholars to act as their manifesto. In it, the group asserts their desire to search for a new artistic paradigm that made sense in the new, postwar climate in Japan – a goal that involved breaking with the past completely. They wrote: "At this place of creation, we will not be taken in by the exaltation of old familiar art in the name of enlightening the masses or permit the imitation of new art in advanced nations under the pretense of formal investigation. We must destroy everything and create everything."

Yoru no Kai's discussions were often framed by Marxist and Surrealist theory. In addition to investigating new frameworks for postwar art and culture, Hanada brought to Yoru no Kai ideas of the importance of Marxist collective production that he had introduced earlier, to Sōgō Bunka Kyōkai. The idea was that the art world of the postwar period would remain fluid, flexible, and collective, rather than static and medium-specific, as art production had been during the wartime years. Part of this fluidity and flexibility was embodied by Hanada and Okamoto's overlapping and complementary philosophies about the necessity for dialectical opposition in the arts. Okamoto's theory of Taikyokushugi ("Theory of Polar Opposites") encouraged preserving tensions between abstraction and representation; Hanada believed inner and outer reality existed in dialectical tension. These beliefs likely contributed to the format of debate and discussion at Yoru no Kai meetings. As Hanada argued, "revolutionary art is born out of vigorous art movements that are advanced by merciless confrontations between avant-garde artists." He thus advocated for collectivism and opposition within the meetings themselves, and reinforced that verbal debates were necessary for new art.

== Activities ==
Yoru no Kai's primary activities involved hosting serialized public debates at Mon Ami with discussion open to attendees. Topics of debate at first included groundbreaking artistic and cultural theories posited by Hanada and Okamoto, such as Okamoto's Taikyokushugi ("Theory of Polar Opposites"). The group also debated and discussed broad issues related to arts and culture, such as Socialist realism, theology, fiction, and humanity. Although early on Yoru no Kai members found common ground in their shared interest in Communism, by May 1949, Yoru no Kai had largely dissolved due to internal arguments surrounding Communist politics.

However, many of the members, including Hanada and Okamoto, remained active in a loosely affiliated group with which Yoru no Kai had collaborated, known as Seiki no Kai (active until May 1951). The volume Atarashii Geijutsu no Tankyū (1949) remains one of the best records of the Yoru no Kai's activities, as it records some of their most significant debates and discussions.

== Influence ==
Within the early postwar period in Japan, which was characterized by an abundance of small artistic groups, Yoru no Kai has become well known as a representative avant-garde group and its influence on postwar art has been acknowledged. Although Yoru no Kai was only active for a brief period of time, it facilitated key exchanges between artists and writers and introduced young creators to avant-garde ideas. According to art critic Shin'ichi Segi, who participated in Yoru no Kai meetings, "the atmosphere of the group was salon-like, it was a place where members exchanged opinions with each other, but from the public format, the result was that it served the role of spreading enlightenment."

Yoru no Kai was especially influential for the other avant-garde groups that it catalyzed. In 1949, after Yoru no Kai had dissolved, Hanada and Okamoto went on to create the Abangyarudo Geijutsu Kenkyūkai (Avant-garde Art Study Group), which was designed to mentor young artists and critics. Among other activities, the group held a critique of artworks at Kifukuji in Tokyo. The following year, the group merged with another group known as Seiki no Kai ("Century Society") that had been established in 1948 by Kōbō Abe and some younger artists who also participated in Yoru no Kai. Many young artists who would become prominent in the postwar art world attended or participated in Yoru no Kai, Abangyarudo Geijutsu Kenkyūkai, and Seiki no Kai, including Tatsuo Ikeda, and Jikken Kōbō members Shōzō Kitadai, Hideko Fukushima, and Katsuhiro Yamaguchi.

With its emphasis on artistic exchange as a means of forging new paths in art, Yoru no Kai could also be seen as an early example of – or early attempt at – the "activity-based collectivism" that would grow over the course of the 1950s with the activities of groups such as Jikken Kōbō and Gutai, and that would come to dominate Japanese avant-garde art during the 1960s.

== Sources ==
- 桂川寬 『廃墟の前衛 : 回想の戦後美術』東京: 一葉社、 2004
- 瀬木 慎一 『戦後空白期の美術』東京: 思潮社、 1996
- 鳥羽耕史「〈世紀の会〉と安部公房を語る：桂川寬氏インタビュー」『言語文化研究』11 (2004)
- 鳥羽耕史 「〈夜の会〉〈世紀の会〉〈 綜合文化協会〉活動年表」『徳島大学国語国文学』17 (2004)
- 成相肇「夜の会」『artscape』https://artscape.jp/artword/index.php/%E5%A4%9C%E3%81%AE%E4%BC%9A
- Yoshida, K. Avant-garde art and nondominant thought in postwar Japan: image, matter, separation. New York: Routledge, 2021.
- Yoshida, Ken. "In Focus: Artists' Groups and Collectives in Postwar Japan." From Postwar to Postmodern: Art in Japan 1945-1989, edited by Doryun Chong, Michio Hayashi, Kenji Kajiya, and Fumihiko Sumitomo, 39-40. New York: The Museum of Modern Art, 2012.
- 「Art Wiki: 夜の会」『美術手帖』https://bijutsutecho.com/artwiki/28

== Publications by the group ==
夜の会編『新しい藝術の探求』東京：月曜書房、1949
