= Shoichi Shiraki =

Japanese painter and printmaker (1912–1995)

Shoichi Shiraki (白木 正一, Shiraki Shōichi; 1912–1995) was a Japanese painter and printmaker from Nagoya. He participated in the first exhibition of the Nagoya Avant-Garde Club in 1938 and joined the Bijutsu Bunka Kyōkai in 1939.

Shiraki lived in New York City from 1958 until 1989 and studied lithography at the Art Students League of New York. His work is held by the Brooklyn Museum and by several public museums in Japan, including the Nagoya City Art Museum, the Museum of Modern Art, Saitama, the Itabashi Art Museum, and the Kōriyama City Museum of Art.

== Life and career ==
Shiraki was born in Nagoya in 1912. After completing an apprenticeship with a maker of Buddhist furnishings, he began studying at an art school in Nagoya run by the painter Kunie Ando in 1932.

Shiraki moved to Tokyo in 1935 and entered the Independent Art Research Institute. In 1937, he studied at the institute run by Ichiro Fukuzawa and had a painting accepted for the seventh exhibition of the Independent Art Association. He also exhibited at the association's eighth exhibition in 1938 and ninth exhibition in 1939. His submission to the eighth exhibition was titled Kōbō (工房).

In June 1938, Shiraki participated in the first exhibition of the Nagoya Avant-Garde Club at the Matsuzakaya department store in Nagoya. The club had been formed in November 1937 around the painter Yoshio Shimozato and the poet and critic Chirū Yamanaka. Shiraki was not among the club's thirteen founding members, but had joined by the time of its first exhibition.

In February 1939, the club's photography section separated as the Nagoya Photo Avant-Garde, formed by Yoshio Shimozato, Minoru Sakata, Seikō Samizo, Chirū Yamanaka, Taizō Inagaki, Tsugio Tajima, and Kansuke Yamamoto. The Nagoya Avant-Garde Club had dissolved by April 1939.

Shiraki joined the Bijutsu Bunka Kyōkai in 1939 and exhibited with the association from its first exhibition in 1940 through its twenty-first exhibition in 1961, except in 1944. He became an associate member of the association in 1946 and a full member in 1948.

Shiraki held a solo exhibition at Saegusa Gallery in Tokyo in 1952 and a joint exhibition with his wife, the painter Tatsue Hayase, at Takemiya Gallery in 1953. Shiraki and Hayase moved to New York City in 1958. He studied lithography at the Art Students League of New York and held several solo exhibitions in New York in 1959 and 1960.

According to the artist chronology published by Kariya City Art Museum, lithographs by Shiraki entered the collections of the Metropolitan Museum of Art and the Brooklyn Museum in 1960. The Brooklyn Museum's online catalogue lists two works by Shiraki, including Untitled No. 1, a 1960 lithograph given to the museum by the artist.

In 1980, the Aichi Prefectural Museum of Art presented an exhibition of approximately 200 works that Shiraki had made since moving to the United States. Shiraki and Hayase returned to Japan in 1989 and settled in Hannō. Shiraki died in 1995.

== Work and collections ==
Shiraki worked in oil painting and printmaking, including lithography and monotype. Art Platform Japan records works by Shiraki in the collections of the Nagoya City Art Museum, the Museum of Modern Art, Saitama, the Itabashi Art Museum, the Kōriyama City Museum of Art, the Kariya City Art Museum, and the Tomioka City Museum and Fukuzawa Ichiro Memorial Gallery.
