= Hideko Fukushima =

Japanese artist

Hideko Fukushima ( 福島秀子, Fukushima Hideko; 1927 – July 2, 1997), born Aiko Fukushima, was a Japanese avant-garde painter born in the Nogizaka neighborhood of Tokyo. She was known as both a founding member of the Tokyo-based postwar avant-garde artist collective Jikken Kōbō and was recruited into Art Informel circles by the critic Michel Tapié during his 1957 trip to Japan. As a member of Jikken Kōbō she participated in art exhibitions, designed visuals for slide shows and costumes and set pieces for dances, theatrical performances, and recitals. She contributed to the postwar push that challenged both the boundaries between media and the nature of artistic collaboration, culminating in the intermedia experiments of Expo '70.

Fukushima was recognized as an avant-garde painter in the 1950s and early 1960s despite never having received formal training. With the support of such figures as Nobuya Abe and Shūzō Takiguchi, she experimented with abstract, cubist, constructivist, and surrealist forms, charting a trajectory from experiments with figurative and facial forms to produce process-based paintings featuring the technique of “stamping” (捺す). It was her works featuring pressed circles and lines that caught the eye of Michel Tapié, and which were featured in various European exhibitions in the late 1950s and early 1960s. Now her work is held in the collections of the Tate Museum, the Museum of Contemporary Art Tokyo, and the Museum of Modern Art, Tokyo, among others.

== Biography ==
=== Early life and career ===
Fukushima grew up in a creative household, raised by a mother trained in Japanese dance and the tea ceremony. She graduated from Bunka Gakuin in 1943, and like many other artists of her generation, never underwent the formal western-style training in drawing and copying techniques that was commonly taught in art schools. Instead, after meeting Katsuhiro Yamaguchi and Shōzō Kitadai in July 1948 at the Summer Modern Art Seminar associated with the Avant-Garde Artists Club (日本アヴァンギャルド美術クラブ)—the three joined four other artists, including Miyoko Yanagida, to form the Shichiyōkai group in August 1948. She debuted as an artist at the 1948 Shichiyōkai Exhibition, then participated in several art discussion groups including the Avant Garde Art Research Group, Yoru no Kai, and Century (Seiki no kai). Within this milieu, there were few other female artists. She participated in the third iteration of the Women's Painting Association's (Joryū Gaka Kyōkai) annual exhibition in 1949, alongside such painters as Yuki Katsura and Aiko Katatani.

Through her involvement in the Summer Modern Art Seminar, she met surrealist painter Nobuya Abe and became involved in Studio 50, an artistic research group that met in his studio. The group self-published a mimeographed booklet, invited critics to speak, and read texts such as György Kepes’ Language of Vision together. Aside from Fukushima and Abe, members included photographer Kiyoji Ōtsuji, artist Hideko Urushibara, and sculptor Aiko Miyawaki.

A series of photographs were taken in Abe’s studio during this time, directed by Abe, shot by Ōtsuji, and featuring Fukushima and other members of the group. While Fukushima is clothed and generally facing more or less toward the camera in images titled "Portrait of an artist," one features another female member of the group nude with her face covered, and the overall series treats human figures in a manner that seems to prefigure Ōtsuji's later object-centric surrealistic photographic style. A selection of these photographs was published in the October 1950 issue of the magazine Camera (Kamera) for a special feature on "The New Photographic Staging by Modern Artists," leaving open the question of who is the artist and blurring the lines between artist and subject. Art historian Midori Yoshimoto argues that these photographs portray the tenuous position of Fukushima and other women artists in Japan at the time, "facing the persisting reality of a woman serving as an object for male artists," even when they are depicted as artists themselves.

=== Participation in Jikken Kōbō ===
It was through Abe that Fukushima met the internationally active surrealist critic and writer Shūzō Takiguchi, and through his support, she gained further prominence throughout the 1950s. In 1951, Fukushima became a founding member of the Tokyo-based 1950s avant-garde collective Jikken Kōbō, an experimental multi-disciplinary and technologically inclined group for whom Takiguchi served as mentor. Fukushima was one of three visual artists in Jikken Kōbō alongside Katsuhiro Yamaguchi and Shōzō Kitadai, and her brother, musician and composer Kazuo Fukushima, was also a member, but she was the sole female participant in the collective. The group's activities were inspired by the European Dadaists, Surrealists, and Bauhaus—movements in which Takiguchi was most deeply invested, but responded to the specific circumstances of 1950s Tokyo, recovering as it was from the war defeat and destruction. They further distinguished themselves through their commitment to a form of collaboration in which the distinction between individuals contributions would be masked to create a collective statement with each performance, exhibition, or presentation. A statement for their first public presentation in 1951 declared their intention “to combine the various art forms, reaching an organic combination that could not be realized within the combinations of a gallery exhibition, and to create a new style of art with social relevance closely related to everyday life.”

Fukushima's role in the group was typical of this collaborative ethos. Although she exhibited her paintings as part of Jikken Kōbō’s 1952 exhibition at Takemiya Gallery and 1956 exhibition at Fūgetsu-dō, both in Tokyo, much of her work in the collective involved her experimenting with other forms of visual expression, including designing sets and costumes for the group's stage performance works. In fact, from Jikken Kōbō's first public presentation of the dance performance The Joy of Life, performed at Hibiya Public Hall in 1951 to accompany the first Picasso exhibition in Tokyo; Fukushima was creating bold geometric costume designs for the dancers to wear as they navigated between Shōzō Kitadai's mobile-like set pieces.

Other examples of her experiments in non-painting media included her collaboration with her brother Kazuo, creating the visuals for the 1953 autoslide projection Foam is Created (Minawa wa tsukurareru), and her designs for costumes and set pieces for the group's 1955 performances of Arnold Schoenberg’s 1912 Pierrot Lunaire at Sankei International Conference Hall, Tokyo.

=== Role in Art Informel ===
Just before Jikken Kōbō unofficially disbanded in 1957, Michel Tapié visited Japan for the first time. During this five-week tour, he visited Tokyo and Osaka, meeting with Sōfū Teshigahara, the Gutai Art Association, Jikken Kōbō, and a number of other figures in the Japanese art scene. It was in this context that he encountered Fukushima's paintings in a gallery, then took the opportunity to visit her studio, eventually encountering her again when he met with the whole Jikken Kōbō group. In his reflections on the trip published as an article for the December 1957 issue of the art periodical Bijutsu techō, Tapié highlighted Fukushima as one of the most promising artists he met, writing:

In my view she is an artist of high caliber. I happened to walk into a gallery in central Tokyo, and there I came upon a work that captivated me in every way...The many works I saw [in Fukushima's studio], due to their nature and the direction of their deep exploration, only confirmed my initial response. She is a rare artist, one who is still hard to categorize, but who is certainly among those to watch and think about in order to correctly understand the forefront of art today and what it proposes for the future.

Tapié's attention launched Fukushima onto the international circuit, and in the late 1950s and early 1960s, she participated in a number of shows in Europe. However, upon her return to Japan after a year and four months in Europe in the early 1960s, there was a marked drop in interest in her work. Nakajima notes that this may have been in part due to her getting married, but it also followed a similar pattern to other new Japanese women artists of the early postwar. Although she continued exhibiting works through the 1980s and into the 1990s, including her later Blue Series, she never regained the spotlight in the Japanese art world.

=== Re-evaluation ===
In spite of Fukushima's prominence in the 1950s and 1960s, with critics and curators including Shūzō Takiguchi, Michel Tapié, and Atsushi Miyakawa discussing and promoting her work, by the 1980s she was rarely featured in the Japanese art press despite her continued gallery exhibitions. However, curator and art historian Reiko Kokatsu's 2005 exhibition on Japanese postwar women artists brought renewed attention to the structural problems women artists faced in getting their work recognized, and prompted a reevaluation of the work of a number of women artists including Hideko Fukushima. In 2009, a large donation of Fukushima's works was made to the Museum of Contemporary Art, Tokyo and Museum of Modern Art, Tokyo, further adding impetus to a reconsideration of her role in the Japanese postwar avant-garde. More recent exhibitions focused on Jikken Kōbō and the Gutai Art Association have reignited research into the roles of Japanese artists in the transnational histories of postwar technological art and Art Informel, reiterating the importance of Fukushima's practice.

In 2012, the Museum of Contemporary Art, Tokyo, presented a collection exhibition focused on Hideko Fukushima, allowing audiences the first opportunity in two decades to see a more comprehensive body of her work. Art historian Izumi Nakajima's 2019 book (in Japanese) on postwar women painters devoted a full chapter to analyzing her oeuvre, the most comprehensive analysis of her work to date, though recent museum exhibitions and magazine features on Japanese women artists indicate the possibility of further analysis of her work moving forward.

== Painting style and development ==
=== Faces and figures ===
Art historian Izumi Nakajima cites three artists as Fukushima's influences in her early painting practice, namely Masanori Murai, Nobuya Abe, and Paul Klee. Nakajima argues that Fukushima drew cubist, constructivist, and surrealist influences through their examples while maintaining some distance from the discourse of these movements by rejecting terms like automatism, rather advocating a rejection of a will dependent on emotion.

Among the more ubiquitous themes for painting in the immediate postwar period in Japan were the face and the human body. As art historian Bert Winther-Tamaki has argued, this was closely tied to attempts by artists to reject wartime rhetoric that emphasized spirit over corporeal life, encouraging young soldiers to give up their lives for the continuity of the Japanese spirit-as-nation-state, realized most pointedly in Léonard Tsuguharu Foujita's paintings of bodies strewn across battlefields, blending with each other and with the earth into monotone masses (ex: Attu Island Gokusai, 1943). Against this precedent, painters active in the early postwar, such as Ichirō Fukuzawa and Nobuya Abe, focused on the materiality of the body, on individual bodies broken by war, and on face-like forms in an attempt to reestablish a kind of humanism denied by war propaganda and to critique the material conditions of the postwar.

Looking specifically at the precedents for mother-and-child paintings and human figures in the work of Abe and Murai, Nakajima argues that Fukushima's face-like paintings maintain an ambiguity that gives them anonymity and even lends some a botanical character that uncomfortably resists the human-centric and individualistic impulses in humanist rhetoric. Nakajima contrasts the playful spontaneity of Murai's layered but misaligned body-like colored shapes and thick lineforms in Mother and Child [Haha to ko] (1950) that appear to convey urban bustle and energy with Fukushima's own Mother and Child [Boshi] (1948). Fukushima's work features similarly thick lines dividing the canvas, but these also serve as boundaries for colored regions, and divide up the canvas into fairly similarly sized parcels while vaguely resembling a face, a breast, and the Japanese character for "mother" (母). Against Murai's clear positive intention, Nakajima sees the layered readings of Fukushima's painting as a resistance to easy humanist expression. Yet in other early figurative paintings by Fukushima, such as Monomaniac II (1950), she seems to draw on Murai's playfulness, though this tendency recedes as her painting practice develops further. In contrast to Abe's cubist figures, such as Sakuhin ("Monomane kozō" no shūsaku) of 1950, Fukushima's rendering of a military policeman directing traffic in MP (1950) reads as somewhere between a human form, a fish mouth, and a leaf-covered tree-form, blending seemingly human and non-human elements ambiguously. As Fukushima's practice develops through the mid-to-late 1960s, and as she begins incorporating the stamping process into her work, those paintings that still appear to maintain some similarity to face-like forms become much more deconstructed, darker, less mobile, and less playful, such as Untitled (1955), Visitor (1956), and An Offering (1957). Most notably, they tend to lack the clear defining facial features that would render emotions legible, instead leaving the viewer with some ambiguity as to the emotional state of these quasi-faces and pushing against the humanist expression of feelings.

=== Stamping ===
Fukushima is also recognized for her use of the process of stamping in her paintings from the later 1950s through the 1960s. Fukushima used various materials soaked with sumi ink to stamp over paper soaked in watercolor washes and gouached surfaces, as well as to create darkened impressions in layers of oil paint and similar materials on canvas. Most often the stamped shapes consisted of lines or circles, as can be seen in Work (1958) and White Noise (1959). Midori Yoshimoto posits the circular forms that became a hallmark of Fukushima's stamping practice as possibly "inspired by Fukushima’s experience in creating a slide projection show entitled Minawa wa tsukurareru (Form Is Created; 1953), in collaboration with her brother, composer Kazuo Fukushima" as part of Jikken Kōbō, describing these more Art Informel works as having "explored the constantly shifting relationship between field and form." This greater ambiguity in compositional strategies in Fukushima's later work is generally recognized as having been tied to a shift away from compositional painting, and toward process through the act of stamping. As the critic Atsushi Miyakawa quoted Fukushima as stating in a feature on her practice for the August 1963 issue of the art magazine Bijutsu techō, "I had serious doubts about the act of painting."

Art historian and curator Yuri Mitsuda connects this assertion to an interest in "surrealist-inflected automatist techniques" that "emphasized process over completion." Nakajima takes this reading a step further to argue that Fukushima rejects both the thoughtless automatism of Surrealism, instead relying on a deeply internal, bodily-led rhythms to guide movements that are at once materially based and void of the emotiveness painters like Nobuya Abe had introduced into their abstract works by the mid-1950s. Similarly, in spite of Fukushima's having been picked up by Michel Tapié as part of his advocacy of Art Informel, Nakajima argues that Fukushima's concerns were actually a difficult fit with the common assumptions of individual expression, bold painterly action, and emotive mark-making that prevailed in action painting circles including Art Informel and the American Abstract Expressionist movement. Instead, the act of stamping or pressing shapes into the painted surfaces of her works severely limited the "painterliness" of her expressions. Nakajima postis that Fukushima's rejection of this male-dominated ego-centric model of painting had a gendered dimension, reflecting the doubts and criticisms of both the art world that would be more apparent to Fukushima given her ambiguous status as both a "lady painter" and a serious internationally recognized avant-garde artist.

=== Blue Series ===
Fukushima's Blue Series began in the 1970s after the intense interest in her work had waned, but it continued certain themes from her earlier paintings, namely the concern with finding alternatives to the action of painting. Rather than "painting," she saw these works, which incorporated blue pigment bleeding across the surface of the work in different forms, as rooted in the act of "pushing" (a homonym for "stamping" in Japanese). Although her early works in blue tended to feature more ambiguous, ill-defined, or bleeding forms, by 1986 she had introduced simple but sharp contrasting lines into the compositions. This is most striking in Gogatsu no shindō III [May Vibrations III] (1986), which features thin horizontal contrasting lines of blue and white across the center of a horizontally-aligned canvas surrounded by deep blues and purples bleeding toward the upper and lower edges of the picture plane.

== Selected exhibitions ==
=== Solo exhibitions ===
1952 Solo show, Takemiya Gallery, Tokyo

1954 Hideko Fukushima Solo Show, Takemiya Gallery, Tokyo

1959 Hideko Fukushima Solo Show, Muramatsu Gallery, Tokyo

1963 Hideko Fukushima Exhibition, Minami Gallery, Tokyo

1974 Hideko Fukushima Solo Exhibition, American Club, Tokyo

1975 Hideko Fukushima Exhibition, Nantenshi Gallery, Tokyo

1976 Hideko Fukushima Exhibition, Ao Gallery, Tokyo

1979 Hideko Fukushima Exhibition, Nantenshi Gallery, Tokyo

1982 Hideko Fukushima Exhibition, Nantenshi Gallery, Tokyo

1986 Hideko Fukushima Exhibition, Nantenshi Gallery, Tokyo

1987 Hideko Fukushima Exhibition, Bunka Gakuin Gallery, Tokyo

1988 Hideko Fukushima Exhibition, Bunka Gakuin Gallery, Tokyo

1992 12th Exhibition Homage to Shuzo Takiguchi: Hideko Fukushima ｢第12回オマージュ滝口修造―福島秀子展 1948‐1988｣, Satani Gallery (佐谷 画廊), Tokyo

2012 MOT Collection Special Feature: Hideko Fukushima / Chronicle 1964-OFF MUSEUM (特集展示福島秀子：編年史1964- OFF MUSEUM), Museum of Contemporary Art, Tokyo

2017 Fukushima Hideko, Tokyo Publishing House, Tokyo

2018 Fukushima Hideko, Taka Ishii Gallery, New York

=== Group exhibitions ===
1948 Shichiyōkai Exhibition, 北荘画廊, Nihonbashi, Tokyo

1952 The 3rd Experimental Workshop Presentation “Plastic Arts Exhibition,” Takemiya Gallery, Tokyo

1955 Experimental Workshop Exhibition: Painting, Sculpture, Photography, Muramatsu Gallery, Tokyo

1955 International Watercolor Exhibition, 18th Biennial, Brooklyn Museum, New York

1955 Present-Day Promising Artists Exhibition 1955 [Konnichi no shinjin 1955-nen-ten], Kanagawa Prefectural Museum of Modern Art

1956 Summer Exhibition: Enjoying New Perspective and Space, by the Members of Experimental Workshop, Fūgetsu-dō, Tokyo

1957 15 Vanguard Artists, Museum of Modern Art, Tokyo

1959 XI Premio Lissone, Italy

1961 Paris Biennale, Paris, France

2005 Japanese Women Artists in Avant-garde Movements, 1950-1975, Tochigi Prefectural Museum of Fine Arts, Utsunomiya, Japan

2013 Jikken Kōbō–Experimental Workshop, The Museum of Modern Art, Kamakura & Hayama; Iwaki City Art Museum, Fukushima; Museum of Modern Art, Toyama; Kitakyushu Municipal Museum of Art, Kitakyushu; Setagaya Art Museum, Tokyo

2013 Tokyo 1955-1970: A New Avant-Garde, The Museum of Modern Art, New York

== Collections ==
- Artizon Museum, Ishibashi Foundation
- Chiba City Museum of Art
- Itabashi Art Museum
- Matsumoto City Museum of Art
- The Museum of Contemporary Art, Tokyo
- The Museum of Modern Art, Kamakura & Hayama
- National Museum of Modern Art, Tokyo
- National Museum of Art, Osaka
- Ohara Museum of Art; the Miyagi Museum of Art
- Taro Okamoto Museum of Art, Kawasaki
- Takamatsu Municipal Museum
- Tate Museum, London
- Tochigi Prefectural Museum of Fine Art
- Toyama Prefectural Museum of Art and Design
- Ishii Collection, The University of Tsukuba
- James Keith Brown and Eric Diefenbach Collection, USA

== Further sources ==
- Katsuhiro Yamaguchi, "The World of Fukushima Hideko: Breaking Away, Into Images", Art Platform Japan BUNKA-CHO, trans. Kohno Haruko (July 30, 2021).
