= Yūshi Kobayashi =

Japanese photographer

Yushi Kobayashi
- Born: December 1898
- Died: 1988 October 26
- Occupation: Photographer
- Organization: K.P.S. (Kyoto Photo Society) Nihon Koga Kyokai

Yūshi Kobayashi (小林 祐史, Kobayashi Yūshi; 1898–1988) was a renowned Japanese photographer. He is known for his avantgarde style photographs and his participation in various art photography clubs and associations. His long career offers us glimpses of the various experimental techniques that were in vogue throughout the years of his life.

== Early life ==
He was born in December 1898 in Tokuyama city in Yamaguchi Prefecture. After losing his father when he was just nine years old, Kobayashi moved to Kyoto. He was left to the guardianship of his uncle, Juichi Kobayashi, who ran a photography studio named Kobayashi Photo Studio in the historical Teramachi area of Kyoto City. He graduated the Kyoto Prefectural Daiichi Junior High School. In 1918, he entered the photography department of the Tokyo Fine Arts School (presently-day Tokyo University of the Arts). There he studied portrait photography under Ezaki Kiyoshi. After graduating in 1923, he returned to work at his uncles studio which he would later inherit after his uncle's death and rename the Yūshi Kobayashi Photo Studio.

== Pre-WWII ==
Around the end of the Taisho Era (1912-1926), Kobayashi's career as a photographer began to gain steam. From the late 1920’s, Kobayashi would go to Karuizawa every summer and open a temporary photography studio to take portraits of the elites who frequented the resort town to escape the summer heat. He took portraits of Yukio Ozaki, Sessue Hayakawa, Inazo Nitobe, Bertrand Russell and others.

He became an active member of Kyoto Photo Society (K.P.S.), working alongside of Noboru Ueki, and Nihon Koga Kyokai, another leading art photography society that took on an artistic perspective towards photography. Through these organizations, Kobayashi became an early champion of the emerging genre of art photography working with various experimental "art photo" techniques. He used oil pigment prints, like bromoil, to create landscape photographs. For his portrait photographs, he used techniques such as soft focus and deformation.

In the 1930’s he began to publish his photographic works and editorials in a photography magazine called The Photo Times. Through the network that the magazine offered him, he was exposed to other photographers interested in "new photography" and avant-garde painters. He was influenced by the modern art movement and his works slowly became even more avant-garde using more experimental techniques like photomontage and x-ray film. His transition during this period is a testament to the synergistic influence and intellectual inquiry that these photography magazines had on the photographers who were active them.

== Post-WWII ==
After the war, Kobayashi begins to summit his work to other photography magazines including Photography. In 1948, he decides to join the Bijutsu Bunka Kyokai ("Fine Art and Culture Association") which was a society of avant-garde artists. In this organization, he became the head of the photography section and submitted his works in exhibitions that the association held in Kyoto as well as Tokyo. Through working with the Bijutsu Bunka Kyokai, Kobayashi became aquatinted with avant-garde painters such as Gentarō Komaki, Nobuya Abe, Noboru Kitawaki, and others. Although Kobayashi's photographic works and the techniques that he employed were already leaning towards the avant-garde, the influences that he absorbed through working with a self-identified society of avant-garde artists encouraged him in his intellectual trajectory.

In 1975, he joined the Panreal Art Association, a group of avant-garde artists. As a photographer he continued to contribute experimental photographs to the organization's group exhibitions through the latter part of his career.

In 1980, he had his first solo exhibition at Kyoto Asahi Hall, exhibiting color photo montage works. In 1988, his works were exhibited in the FotoFest ’88 based in Houston, Texas.

Kobayashi passed away in Kyoto City in 1988.
