= Ryūichi =

- Gender: Male

Origin
- Origin: Japanese
- Meaning: Different meanings depending on the kanji used

Ryūichi, Ryuichi or Ryuuichi (written: 隆一, 龍一 or 竜一) is a masculine Japanese given name. Notable people with the name include:

- Ryuichi Abe (阿部 龍一; born 1954), Japanese academic
- Ryūichi Amano (天野 龍一; 1902–1995), Japanese photographer
- Ryuichi Doi (土肥 隆一; born 1939), Japanese politician
- Ryuichi Hirashige (平繁 龍一; born 1988), Japanese footballer
- Ryūichi Hiroki (廣木 隆一; born 1954), Japanese film director and editor
- Ryuichi Horibe (堀部 隆一; 1943), Japanese voice actor
- Ryuichi Kaji (嘉治 隆一; 1896–1978), Japanese journalist
- Ryuichi Kajimae (加治前 竜一; born 1985), Japanese baseball player
- Ryuichi Kamiyama (神山 竜一; born 1984), Japanese footballer
- Ryuichi Kawamura (河村 隆一; born 1970), Japanese singer-songwriter, actor and record producer
- Ryuichi Kihara (木原 龍一; born 1992), Japanese figure skater
- Ryūichi Kijima (隆一木島), Japanese voice actor
- Ryuichi Kiyonari (清成 龍一; born 1982), Japanese motorcycle racer
- Ryuichi Kobayashi (小林 竜一; born 1976), Japanese bobsledder
- Ryuichi Kosugi (小杉 竜一; born 1935), Japanese comedian
- Kuki Ryūichi (九鬼 隆一; 1852–1931), Japanese samurai
- Ryuichi Moriya (守屋 龍一; born 1985), Japanese archer
- Ryuichi Murata (村田 龍一; born 1976), Japanese judoka and mixed martial artist
- Ryuichi Obitani (帯谷 竜一; 1908–?), Japanese figure skater
- Ryuichi Oda (小田 龍一; born 1976), Japanese golfer
- Ryuichi Ogata (緒方 龍一; born 1985), Japanese singer and musician
- Ryuichi Sakamoto (坂本 龍一; 1952–2023), Japanese musician and composer
- Ryuichi Sugiyama (杉山 隆一; born 1941), Japanese footballer and manager
- Ryūichi Tamura (田村 隆一; 1923–1998), Japanese poet, writer and translator
- Ryuichi Yoneyama (米山 隆一; born 1967), Japanese politician
- Ryuichi Maruyama (角川竜二born 1992), Russian sale manager

== Fictional characters ==
- Phoenix Wright, known as Ryūichi Naruhodo (成歩堂 龍一) in the original Japanese versions of the Ace Attorney series
- Ryuichi Sakuma, (佐久間竜一, Sakuma Ryūichi in Japanese) is the lead singer of a band called Nittle Grasper in the shōnen-ai manga and anime series Gravitation.
