= Hisahito Yonekura =

Japanese Surrealist painter and poet (1905–1994)

- 米倉壽仁
- Born: 19 February 1905; Kōfu, Yamanashi Prefecture, Japan
- Died: 18 March 1994 (aged 89); Tokorozawa, Saitama Prefecture, Japan
- Known for: Painting, poetry
- Movement: Surrealism

Hisahito Yonekura (米倉壽仁, Yonekura Hisahito) (19 February 1905 – 18 March 1994) was a Japanese Surrealist painter and poet. He was a founding member of the Sōki Bijutsu Kyōkai in 1938 and the Bijutsu Bunka Kyōkai in 1939. The Yamanashi Prefectural Museum of Art regards his 1936 painting The Crisis of Europe as a representative work of both his prewar career and Japanese Surrealist painting.

== Life and work ==
Yonekura was born in Kōfu, Yamanashi Prefecture, on 19 February 1905. He entered Nagoya Higher Commercial School in 1923 and graduated in 1926. While studying in Nagoya, he became friends with the poet Chirū Yamanaka.

After graduating, Yonekura returned to Kōfu and worked as a teacher while studying painting independently. In 1931, a painting based on Jean Cocteau's "Nocturne" was accepted for the 18th Nika Exhibition. His painting Window was accepted for the fifth Independent Art Association exhibition in 1935. He left teaching and moved to Tokyo the following year.

Yonekura published his first poetry collection, Tōmei na Saigetsu (透明ナ歳月), in 1937. In 1938, he helped found the Sōki Bijutsu Kyōkai. The following year, he joined Ichiro Fukuzawa and other avant-garde artists in founding the Bijutsu Bunka Kyōkai.

His paintings from the late 1930s included The Crisis of Europe (1936), Monument (1937), and Catastrophe (The Day of Annihilation) (1939). The Crisis of Europe combines an old map of Europe with the image of a cracked skull and broken mechanical parts. Catastrophe (The Day of Annihilation) is held by the National Museum of Modern Art, Tokyo.

Yonekura left the Bijutsu Bunka Kyōkai in 1951. The following year, he co-founded the Salon de Juin and continued to exhibit with the group.

The Yamanashi Prefectural Museum of Art held an exhibition of Yonekura's work from 26 May to 24 June 1979. Another exhibition devoted to his work was held there from 19 November 2022 to 22 January 2023.

Yonekura died in Tokorozawa, Saitama Prefecture, on 18 March 1994, aged 89.

== Selected works ==
- The Crisis of Europe (ヨーロッパの危機), 1936, Yamanashi Prefectural Museum of Art
- Catastrophe (The Day of Annihilation) (破局（寂滅の日）), 1939, National Museum of Modern Art, Tokyo
- The Black Sun (黒い太陽), 1954, Yamanashi Prefectural Museum of Art

== Poetry ==
- Tōmei na Saigetsu (透明ナ歳月), 1937
