= Tetsu Okada =

Japanese painter associated with Surrealism in Nagoya (1914–2007)

- 岡田徹
- Born: 1914; Nagoya, Japan
- Died: 2007 (aged 92–93)
- Occupation: Painter
- Known for: Nagoya Surrealist painting; the Nagoya Avant-Garde Club; Bijutsu Bunka Kyōkai
- Movement: Japanese Surrealism, avant-garde

Tetsu Okada (岡田徹, 1914–2007) was a Japanese painter associated with Surrealism and avant-garde art in Nagoya. Largely self-taught, he was active in the city's prewar Surrealist milieu and helped form the groups Avant-Garde, Torupi, and the Nagoya Avant-Garde Club. In 1941, during the wartime repression of Japanese Surrealism, the Special Higher Police searched his home and confiscated most of the works and records in his studio. After World War II, he remained active as a painter, organizer, and teacher in the Nagoya art world.

== Life and career ==
Okada was born in Nagoya in 1914. He was largely self-taught as a painter and became one of the figures associated with Surrealist art in the Tōkai region.

In 1936, Okada, Kaneo Togawa, Sanshin Yoshikawa, and other painters formed the group Avant-Garde. Yoshio Shimozato supported the group and was later invited to lead its successor, Torupi, which was formed in 1937. Later that year, Okada also participated in the formation of the interdisciplinary Nagoya Avant-Garde Club, which brought together painters, critics, poets, and photographers in Nagoya.

The 1990 exhibition catalogue published by the Nagoya City Art Museum states that the Nagoya Avant-Garde Club was formed in November 1937 around Shimozato and Chirū Yamanaka. It lists Okada among its founding members, together with painters including Kaneo Togawa, Sanshin Yoshikawa, Noboru Ōguchi, Tatsuo Imai, Shigeaki Ikai, Kaoru Andō, 鈴木鎮, and Kazuyuki Mitsuzaki, as well as photographers Minoru Sakata and Seikō Samizo. The same source states that the club split and dissolved in April 1939 after some of its members turned increasingly toward photography.

A separate entry in the same catalogue states that Nagoya Photo Avant-Garde was formed in February 1939 from the photography section of the Nagoya Avant-Garde Club and included Kansuke Yamamoto among its members. Okada and Yamamoto were thus active in different branches of the same broader Nagoya Surrealist network during the late 1930s.

After the breakup of the Nagoya Avant-Garde Club, Okada and other painters, including Kaneo Togawa, Sanshin Yoshikawa, and Noboru Ōguchi, joined the newly established Bijutsu Bunka Kyōkai. In July 1939, they formed a new group, 瀝𣵛会, and held its first exhibition. All of the group's members exhibited at the first Bijutsu Bunka Kyōkai exhibition in April 1940, where members received awards. Nagoya Gallery likewise states that Okada took part in the establishment of Bijutsu Bunka Kyōkai in 1939.

== Wartime repression ==
In 1941, as wartime political pressure intensified and Japanese Surrealism came under suspicion, Okada's home was searched by the Special Higher Police. Museum and gallery accounts state that most of the works in his studio, together with his records, were confiscated. The Kiyosu City Haruhi Museum of Art places this episode in the broader wartime repression that also affected figures such as Ichirō Fukuzawa and Shūzō Takiguchi.

This wartime experience left Okada with a lasting hostility toward abuses of power and a strongly anti-establishment spirit, themes that shaped much of his later work.

== Postwar work and legacy ==
After the war, Okada continued to work as a painter in Nagoya. The Kiyosu City Haruhi Museum of Art describes his later work as addressing war, killing, and environmental destruction through series such as Green Work, Angels, Crows, Atomic Bomb, and Starry Night. artscape describes him as an artist who continued to depict social irrationality even after experiencing wartime cultural repression, and as one of the figures who led Surrealist art in the Tōkai region.

Okada also remained active as an organizer and educator. Kiyosu City Haruhi Museum of Art notes that he long served as a representative of Bijutsu Bunka Kyōkai and helped launch regional groups including the Chūbu Zaiya Art Federation and the Chūbu Artists Council.

His work is held by museums including the Aichi Prefectural Museum of Art and the Kariya City Art Museum, and Art Platform Japan's museum-collections search lists 29 collection records for his work nationwide. He was the subject of centenary and 110th-anniversary exhibitions at Kiyosu City Haruhi Museum of Art in 2014 and 2024, and of a 2024 exhibition at Nagoya Gallery devoted to "Tetsu Okada and Surrealism in Nagoya".

== See also ==
- Nagoya Photo Avant-Garde
- Nagoya Avant-Garde Club
- Surrealism in Japan
- Kansuke Yamamoto (artist)
