= Wartime repression of Surrealism in Japan =

Wartime censorship and police pressure on Japanese Surrealism

Wartime repression of Surrealism in Japan involved police scrutiny, censorship, detention, and other official pressure on writers, artists, photographers, editors, journals, and art groups associated with Surrealism in Japan in the late 1930s and early 1940s. In April 1941, Fukuzawa Ichirō and Shūzō Takiguchi were detained under suspicion of violating the Peace Preservation Law. Other documented cases included pressure on Surrealist publications, Kansuke Yamamoto's interrogation over Yoru no Funsui, the wartime renaming of the Nagoya Photo Avant-Garde, and arrests or searches involving figures in Nagoya, Nagano, and Hiroshima.

== Events ==
Surrealism entered Japan through poetry and literary magazines in the late 1920s and spread during the 1930s into painting, criticism, photography, design, and small magazines. Japanese Surrealism reached a high point around 1937 before being curtailed by wartime ideological and cultural control. In Nagoya, Surrealist activity developed through poetry, photography, criticism, small magazines, and photographic groups. Kansuke Yamamoto began publishing the Surrealist poetry journal Yoru no Funsui in 1938 and joined the Nagoya Photo Avant-Garde in 1939.

The political setting was shaped by the Peace Preservation Law and the Special Higher Police. Police pressure on Surrealist-related publishing appeared from 1936, when the Ecole de Tokyo Art Association issued the first number of its bulletin Ecole de Tokio, which included translations of Aragon, an essay by Takiguchi on the future of Surrealism, and a text by Oguma Hideo that discussed Japanese Surrealism in relation to contemporary social conditions. The issue was confiscated after publication; Oguma was detained and the publisher Suenaga Taneo was questioned.

The revision of the Peace Preservation Law on 10 March 1941 broadened the scope of policing and made art associations and groups subject to surveillance and control. Fukuzawa Ichirō and Shūzō Takiguchi were detained on 5 April 1941. Police viewed Surrealism as connected with communism. Fukuzawa and Takiguchi were detained for about seven months.

Police action and wartime pressure were not confined to Tokyo. Other cases involved figures connected with Surrealist and avant-garde circles in Aichi, Nagano, and Hiroshima. In Nagoya, Yamamoto was questioned by the Special Higher Police in 1939 over Yoru no Funsui and did not continue publishing the journal. Meanwhile, the Nagoya Photo Avant-Garde changed its name in November 1939 to the Nagoya Photography Culture Association to avoid attracting police attention. The group moved in a more conservative direction and dissolved in 1941. Also in Nagoya, the painter Tetsu Okada had his home searched by the Special Higher Police. Most of the works in his studio were confiscated. Sanshin Yoshikawa, who was associated with prewar avant-garde art, was detained by the Special Higher Police in 1941. In Nagano, the poet Gen'ichirō Takahashi, who was associated with the journal Lien, was detained in December 1941. In Hiroshima, the painter Shō Yamaji was detained in 1941.

The Bijutsu Bunka Association, which was under official surveillance, issued a statement on "national art" and said that it would continue its activities in line with national policy.

Many works by artists associated with Japanese Surrealism were lost to wartime damage, and the deaths of artists during the war delayed postwar verification and reassessment of the movement.

== See also ==
- Censorship in the Empire of Japan
- Political repression in Imperial Japan
- Political prisoners in Imperial Japan
