= Ginrin =

- Directed by: Genichiro Higuchi; Toshio Matsumoto; Masao Yabe
- Written by: Shozo Kitashiro; Toshio Matsumoto; Katsuhiro Yamaguchi
- Cinematography: Hidesaburo Araki
- Music by: Hiroyoshi Suzuki; Tōru Takemitsu
- Production companies: Japan Bicycle Industry Association; Shin Riken-eiga
- Release date: 1955
- Running time: 12 minutes
- Country: Japan
- Language: Japanese

Ginrin (銀輪; "Silver Ring"), also known as Bicycle in Dream and Silver Wheels, is a 1955 Japanese short promotional colour film directed by Genichiro Higuchi, Toshio Matsumoto and Masao Yabe in collaboration with the Jikken Kōbō avant-garde art collective. It was written by Shozo Kitashiro, Matsumoto and Katsuhiro Yamaguchi for the Japan Bicycle Industry Association and was Matsumoto's first film.

The film promotes Japanese bicycles, using experimental cinema techniques. The musique-concrète score was by Hiroyoshi Suzuki and Tōru Takemitsu.

== Scenario ==
A boy looks through a picture book about bicycles and sees surrealistic images.

== Reception ==
Miryam Sas of the University of California, Berkeley wrote: "From the sponsors' viewpoint, Ginrin showcases the simple pleasures of color cinema and the cycling apparatus, both as ways of experiencing/mediating selected elements of the (in this case) natural environment, the 'beauty of nature.' Yet at another level, the effects of scale here parallel the effects of speed: with the parallax view, with mechanical objects whirling in space, the film reflects on the experience of the technologically mediated environment. ... Ginrin represents a historically significant moment of innovation, framing collaborations between artists across media with an interest in how the apparatus and mechanism affect the physical experience of the environment."

== Preservation status ==
The film was believed lost for many years; however, a copy was found and digitally restored by the National Film Center of the National Museum of Modern Art, Tokyo.
