= Yōko Mitsui =

Japanese poet

- Born: Sachiko Yamajō (山荘幸子); January 1, 1936; Osaka Prefecture
- Died: January 2, 2014 (aged 78)
- Education: Soai Women's Junior College
- Occupation: poet
- Writing career
- Language: Japanese
- Period: 1964 - 2014
- Genre: poetry
- Notable awards: Contemporary Female Poets' Award (1976); Poetry Museum Award (1999)

Yōko Mitsui (三井 葉子, Mitsui Yōko; January 1, 1936 – January 2, 2014) was a Japanese poet.

== Life ==
Born in Osaka Prefecture as Sachiko Yamajō, she graduated from Soai Women's Junior College. She studied under Tōzaburō Ono at the Osaka Literature School.

Mitsui died of liver failure on January 2, 2014, at the age of 78.

== Works ==
- 『白昼 詩集』竜詩社 1964
- 『沼 三井葉子詩集』創元社 1966
- 『いろ 三井葉子詩集』私家版、1967
- 『たま 詩集』風社 1974
- 『浮舟 詩集』深夜叢書社 1976
- 『君や来し 三井葉子詩集』海風社 1981
- 『春の庭 三井葉子詩集』沖積舎 1983 現代女流自選詩集叢書
- 『三井葉子詩集』砂子屋書房 1983
- 『三井葉子詩集』日本現代詩文庫 倉橋健一編集 土曜美術社 1984
- 『日の記 詩集』富岡書房 1986
- 『つづれ刺せ 三井葉子随筆集』編集工房ノア 1987
- 『畦の薺 三井葉子詩集』富岡書房 1989
- 『風が吹いて 詩集』花神社 1990
- 『二輛電車が登ってくる』エディション・カイエ 1990
- 『ええやんか 大阪辯歳時記』ビレッジプレス 1992
- 『菜庭 詩集』花神社 1994
- 『恋のうた 100の想い100のことば』創元社 1995
- 『草のような文字』深夜叢書社 1998
- 『よろしゃんナ 猫版大阪辯歳時記』ビレッジプレス 2000
- 『菜の花畑の黄色の底で 三井葉子詩集』深夜叢書社 2002
- 『風土記』深夜叢書社 2003
- 『さるすべり』深夜叢書社 2005
- 『桃 三井葉子句集』洛西書院 2005
- 『花 句まじり詩集』深夜叢書社 2008
- 『楽市楽談』編著 編集工房ノア 2009
- 『人文 三井葉子詩集』編集工房ノア 2010
- 『灯色醗酵』思潮社 2011

== Bibliography ==
- Bungei Almanac 2011
- Shinji Saitō, Yoko Mitsui no sekai- uta to eien ("Yoko Mitsui's World- Poems and Eternity"), Shinyasosho, 2011
