= Kyoto Photo Society =

Japanese amateur photography society

Kyoto Photo Society （キヨウト・ホト・ソサエテ）(1925-1960s) was an amateur group of photographers active in the Kyoto area. The ARS Camera Annual states that the organization was established in the 1925 by Motohiko Goto. Other members included Noboru Ueki and Yushi Kobayashi among others. Photography Historian Ryuichi Kaneko notes that there were various photography clubs emerging in the Kansai Area such as the Nihon Kōga Geijutsu Kyōkai (Japan Photographic Art Association, 日本光画芸術協会), Naniwa Photography Club, and the Tampei Photography Club, but these focused around the Osaka-Kobe region. Although there were photographers from the Kyoto area who were members of these groups, the Kyoto Photo Society was the first amateur group of photographers from the Kyoto area. They are introduced together as the Kyoto Photo Society in the October 1939 issue of the Photo Times.

After World War II, avant-garde photography was released from the restrictions of wartime censorship. Kaneko notes that while Japanese photography was more focused on documentary-style photorealism. Groups such as the Kyoto Photo Society made headways in the field of avant-garde photography. The group held exhibitions with other notable photography clubs and organizations such as the Association of Avant-Garde Photography, Nagoya Photo Avant-Garde, Hyogo Photographers Group, and Modern Photography Society.

The group naturally dissipates and key members of this group such as Noboru Ueki and Yushi Kobayashi become core members of the Kyoto Photo Artists Association.
