= Yutaka Haniya =

Japanese writer (1909–1997)

- 埴谷 雄高
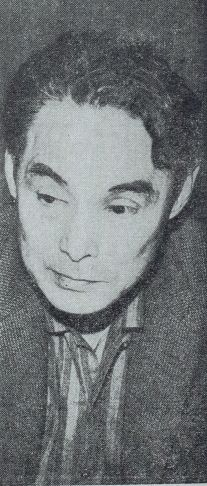
- Haniya in 1963
- Born: December 19, 1909; Shinchiku City, Taiwan, Empire of Japan
- Died: February 19, 1997 (aged 87); Kichijōji, Musashino City, Tokyo prefecture, Japan
- Occupations: Writer and critic
- Writing career
- Language: Japanese
- Years active: 1931-1997
- Genres: Fiction, criticism
- Notable works: Departed Souls (1933-1997); Black Horses in the Darkness and Other Stories (1970

Yutaka Haniya (埴谷 雄高, Haniya Yutaka; December 19, 1909 – February 19, 1997) was a Japanese writer and critic.

== Biography ==
Haniya was born in Taiwan, then a Japanese colony, to a samurai family named Hannya after the Hannya Shingyo (Heart Sutra). He had a sickly childhood and suffered from tuberculosis in his teens. Although originally interested in anarchism, in 1931 he joined the Japanese Communist Party, becoming its Agriculture Director the following year, whereupon he was promptly arrested and imprisoned. While in the prison's hospital, he devoted himself to studying Immanuel Kant's Critique of Pure Reason.

In 1933, Haniya underwent a coerced "ideological conversion" (tenkо̄), after which he was allowed to leave prison and return to society. During the war years, he eked out a meager living as the editor of a small magazine on economics and a freelance translator.

During the war years, Haniya began a lengthy novel called Departed Souls (死靈, Shirei), which he considered his life's work. A pastiche of Fyodor Dostoyevsky's novels The Brothers Karamazov and Demons, Haniya's novel was bitterly critical of the Japan Communist Party (JCP) and the Communist International under Soviet Premier Joseph Stalin, which Haniya viewed as capricious and cruel. Because of its strong anti-communism, Departed Souls was praised and upheld as an exemplar of successful tenkо̄ conversion by the wartime police state.

After World War II, when the Japan Communist Party was legalized under the U.S.-led Occupation of Japan, many of Haniya's old comrades rejoined the party, but Haniya did not. He returned to leftist activism, but remained strongly critical of the JCP and Stalinism. Shortly after the war, Haniya founded an influential literary magazine entitled Kindai Bungaku ("Modern Literature"). In this role he discovered and published Kōbō Abe, who subsequently joined Haniya's avant-garde group Yoru no Kai (Night Group).

In 1960, Haniya participated in the massive Anpo protests against the U.S.-Japan Security Treaty, but was bitterly disappointed at the failure of the protests to stop the treaty, and lamented that the movement did not evolve into a broader socialist revolution. Haniya angrily declared the protests to have been a "revolutionless revolution." During the course of the protests in 1960, many radical left-wing student activists became disillusioned with the Communist Party. Haniya's writings became popular among these students because of his strong stand against the JCP, which led Haniya, along with similarly anti-JCP writers and critics such as Takaaki Yoshimoto, to become remembered as the intellectual forefathers of the anti-JCP "New Left" in Japan.

Haniya was a prolific writer; after his death, Kodansha published his complete works in a set of 19 volumes. He won the 6th Tanizaki Prize in 1970 for his collection Black Horses in the Darkness and Other Stories. When Haniya died in 1997, he was still working on his novel Departed Souls, which by that time extended to over 9,000 pages in length.

== Selected works ==
- Departed Souls, (Shirei, 死靈), 1933-1997 (first published beginning in 1946)
- Black Horses in the Darkness and Other Stories, (Yami no naka no kuroi uma, 闇のなかの黒い馬), 1970
