= Bijutsu Bunka Kyōkai =

Japanese avant-garde art association founded in 1939

- 美術文化協会
- Formation: May 1939
- Founder: Ichirō Fukuzawa (and others)
- Founded at: Tokyo, Japan
- Type: Art association
- Purpose: Promotion of avant-garde art (including Surrealism); organization of exhibitions; publication of an association journal
- Headquarters: Tokyo, Japan
- Region served: Japan
- Products: Exhibitions; Bijutsu Bunka (美術文化)
- Fields: Avant-garde art; Surrealism; painting; sculpture; printmaking; photography (postwar)
- Official language: Japanese
- Key people: Shūzō Takiguchi; Kansuke Yamamoto (photography section, 1949)

Bijutsu Bunka Kyokai (美術文化協会, lit. Art and Culture Association) was a Japanese avant-garde art association active from the late 1930s through the wartime Shōwa period and into the postwar era, noted for modernist tendencies that placed particular emphasis on Surrealism. Founded in Tokyo in May 1939 by the painter Ichirō Fukuzawa and others, it organized juried exhibitions and published the association bulletin Bijutsu Bunka (美術文化). Its first public exhibition opened in April 1940 at the Tokyo Prefectural Art Museum (now the Tokyo Metropolitan Art Museum).

In April 1941, amid wartime suppression of Surrealism and other avant-garde activity, Fukuzawa and the poet–critic Shūzō Takiguchi were arrested (on suspicion of violating the Peace Preservation Law) and detained for several months, an episode often treated as a key turning point in the association's wartime history. After the war, the association continued its activities across media; in 1949 a photography section was newly established, and the photographer-poet Kansuke Yamamoto joined that year.

== History ==
=== Background and founding (1939) ===
Bijutsu Bunka Kyōkai (美術文化協会) was formed in Tokyo in May 1939 as a new platform for artists associated with Surrealism and other avant-garde tendencies. Contemporary records in the Bijutsu Kai Nenshi (art-world chronicle) note that the painter Ichiro Fukuzawa—who had recently left the Dokuritsu Bijutsu Kyōkai (Independent Art Association)—organized the group with thirty-nine colleagues, and that an inaugural meeting was held on 17 May 1939.

According to artscape's overview, the founding membership consolidated artists from multiple pre-existing circles and groups, including members of Sōki Bijutsu Kyōkai (創紀美術協会) and other small avant-garde collectives active in the late 1930s (e.g., 九室会, the “JAN” group, 表現, Jeune Homme, Des Amis, and 貌). Sōki Bijutsu Kyōkai itself was short-lived (founded 1938) and, after staging a limited number of activities, dissolved in May 1939 and merged into the newly established Bijutsu Bunka Kyōkai. artscape further characterizes Bijutsu Bunka Kyōkai, alongside the Jiyū Bijutsu Kyōkai (Free Artists Association), as one of the principal prewar hubs for Japan's avant-garde painters.

=== Early activities: exhibitions and the journal ===
From the outset, Bijutsu Bunka Kyōkai's activities centered on two linked public platforms: regular group exhibitions—often referred to as the Bijutsu Bunka Kyōkai Exhibition (Bijutsu Bunka-ten; 美術文化協会展 / 美術文化展)—and its official journal, Bijutsu Bunka (美術文化).

The journal was launched in August 1939 as the association's organ; bibliographic records indicate that it ran at least from the inaugural issue (1939.8) through issue 6 (1941.6).

In parallel, the exhibitions provided the group's main public forum. The first juried public exhibition was held at the Tokyo Prefectural Art Museum (Tokyo-fu Bijutsukan) in April 1940, and the early shows established an annual rhythm in the early wartime years, including:

- 1st Bijutsu Bunka Kyōkai Exhibition (Tokyo Prefectural Art Museum), 11–19 April 1940.
- 2nd Bijutsu Bunka Kyōkai Exhibition (Tokyo Prefectural Art Museum), 27 April–6 May 1941.
- 3rd Bijutsu Bunka Kyōkai Exhibition (Tokyo Prefectural Art Museum), 27 May–4 June 1942.

Catalogues and related printed ephemera for these early exhibitions also survive and are used by later scholarship to reconstruct specific works and participation; for example, a museum bulletin notes that a work shown in the third exhibition is known today through a monochrome picture postcard made for the show.

=== Wartime repression and wartime shifts (1941–1945) ===
In the early 1940s, the association operated under intensifying wartime surveillance and cultural control. On 5 April 1941, the painter Ichiro Fukuzawa—a central figure in the association—and the poet and art critic Shūzō Takiguchi were arrested and detained for roughly seven months under suspicion of violating the Peace Preservation Law. In accounts of wartime repression of Surrealism in Japan, the incident is described as an instance in which the authorities treated Surrealism as ideologically suspect and potentially linked to communism, even though the case did not rest on concrete evidence of communist activity by the two figures.

The arrests had a chilling effect on the association's activities. artscape notes that, after the 1941 crackdown, wartime themes increasingly appeared in works exhibited by members and in assigned productions, reflecting the pressures of the period; the association also undertook more overtly wartime-aligned initiatives, including organizing an aviation-themed art exhibition in 1944.

After the end of the war, the association resumed activities in 1946, and later became a postwar platform that expanded to include photographers; Kansuke Yamamoto joined in 1949 as a member of its photography section.

=== Postwar resumption and later development ===
After Japan's defeat in 1945, the association resumed activities in 1946 and restarted its exhibitions and organizational work. artscape also notes that a breakaway group of younger members split off in 1947 to form the Zen'ei Bijutsukai (前衛美術会), while the Bijutsu Bunka Kyōkai itself continued thereafter as an artists’ association.

In the late 1940s, the association also became a postwar platform that expanded beyond painting to include photography. Photography critic Ryūichi Kaneko reports that the Bijutsu Bunka Kyōkai established a photography section in January 1949, attracting photographers connected to prewar avant-garde circles (including Nagoya networks), and lists among its members the Nagoya-based photographer-poet Kansuke Yamamoto (alongside figures such as Kiyoji Ōtsuji, Keiichirō Gotō, Minayoshi Takada, and Yoshifumi Hattori).

== Organization and sections ==
Bijutsu Bunka Kyōkai was conceived as a multi-disciplinary avant-garde artists' association. Contemporary reference works describe the group as bringing together artists working across multiple fields—including painting, sculpture, design and photography—under a broadly Surrealist-leaning, experimental orientation. Artscape likewise characterizes the association as a major prewar hub for avant-garde painters and notes that it was formed in May 1939 through the merger of participants from several existing groups and circles around the Independent Art Association (Dokuritsu Bijutsu Kyōkai) and related collectives.

=== Fields of activity / sections ===
Art Platform Japan (Dictionary of Artists in Japan) lists Bijutsu Bunka Kyōkai's fields of activity as: painting, sculpture, printmaking, photography, crafts, design, and media art, reflecting its cross-medium scope as an association rather than a single-medium group. In practice, the association's activities were anchored by its exhibitions and its organ journal Bijutsu Bunka (美術文化), which provided a shared platform across these fields.

=== Membership and exhibition format ===
At its founding, the association comprised roughly forty artists drawn from multiple circles (including departures from Dokuritsu and other small avant-garde groups). A standard reference account further notes that the group launched its journal in August 1939 and staged its first kōbo (open-call) exhibition in April 1940 at the Tokyo Prefectural Art Museum (now the Tokyo Metropolitan Art Museum), situating the association within Japan's broader ecosystem of juried public exhibitions organized by art groups.

=== Photography section ===
Photo historian Ryūichi Kaneko situates the association's photography section within the postwar resurgence of experimental photography, noting that Bijutsu Bunka Kyōkai established a dedicated photography section in January 1949. In Kaneko's account, the section drew in photographers connected to prewar avant-garde movements—including members associated with the Nagoya Photo Avant-Garde (ナゴヤ・フォト・アバンガルド) and Osaka-based circles—at a moment when postwar photographic groups were rapidly reorganizing across regions.

Kaneko further reports (citing a contemporaneous notice by photographer Yasushi Takabayashi in the June 1950 issue of the magazine カメラ (Camera)) that the photography section's membership list included multiple regional clusters. The notice named, among others:

- Nagoya: Kansuke Yamamoto, Keiichirō Gotō (後藤敬一郎), Yoshifumi Hattori (服部義文), Minayoshi Takada (高田皆義)
- Tokyo: Kiyoji Ōtsuji; Yasushi Takabayashi (高林靖); 徳山暉芳
- Osaka: Amano Ryūichi (天野龍一); Hirai Terushichi (平井輝七); 本庄光郎; 池宮清二郎; Nakafuji Atsushi (中藤敦)

Within the association's own exhibition framework, Ōtsuji is documented as exhibiting at the 9th Bijutsu Bunka Exhibition in March 1949 at the Tokyo Metropolitan Art Museum (東京都美術館) in Ueno, and as becoming a member of the newly established photography section at that time.

For the association's connection to postwar photography networks, Kaneko's membership list notably includes four co-founders of the Nagoya-based postwar photography collective VIVI. Yamamoto's published biography records that he co-founded VIVI in 1947 with Gotō, Hattori, and Takada, and that he joined Bijutsu Bunka Kyōkai in 1949 as a member of its photography section (remaining affiliated until 1954). Together, these documented overlaps make the photography section a clear point of contact between the association's postwar avant-garde art milieu and experimental photography activities centered in Nagoya and beyond.

== Notable members and associated figures ==
Sources differ slightly on the number of founding members, giving either forty or forty-one. The list below is selective.

=== Founding members (selected) ===
The founding members in May 1939 included:

- Ichirō Fukuzawa (福沢一郎)
- Ai-Mitsu (靉光)
- Saburō Asō (麻生三郎)
- Wasaburō Itozono (糸園和三郎)
- Nobuya Abe (阿部展也)
- Iwami Furusawa (古沢岩美)
- Hisahito Yonekura (米倉寿仁)
- Yoshishige Saitō (斎藤義重)
- Noboru Kitawaki (北脇昇)
- Tadashi Sugimata (杉全直)
- Gentarō Komaki (小牧源太郎)
- Masaaki Terada (寺田政明)
- Tadashi Yoshii (吉井忠)

=== Other members and participants (selected) ===
Artists who later joined or participated in the association included Chōzaburō Inoue, Iri Maruki, Mutsumi Ōtsuka, Kikuji Yamashita, and Norio Ide.

- Chōzaburō Inoue (井上長三郎)
- Iri Maruki (丸木位里)
- Toshi Maruki (丸木俊)
- Mutsumi Ōtsuka (大塚睦)
- Kikuji Yamashita (山下菊二)
- Norio Ide (井出則雄)
- Yoshio Shimozato (下郷羊雄)
- Tetsu Okada (岡田徹)
- Sanshin Yoshikawa (吉川三伸)

=== Photography section (selected) ===
The association established a photography section in January 1949. Photo historian Ryūichi Kaneko notes that Noboru Ueki and Yūshi Kobayashi took part, and cites a notice published by Yasushi Takabayashi in the June 1950 issue of Camera that named members from Nagoya, Tokyo, and Osaka.

- Kansuke Yamamoto (山本悍右)
- Keiichirō Gotō (後藤敬一郎)
- Yoshifumi Hattori (服部義文)
- Minayoshi Takada (高田皆義)
- Kiyoji Ōtsuji (大辻清司)
- Noboru Ueki (植木昇)
- Yūshi Kobayashi (小林祐史)
- Ryūichi Amano (天野龍一)
- Terushichi Hirai (平井輝七)
- Kōrō Honjō (本庄光郎)

=== Associated figures ===
- Shūzō Takiguchi (瀧口修造) – an art critic and leading theorist of Surrealism in Japan. Takiguchi and Ichirō Fukuzawa, a central figure in the Bijutsu Bunka Kyōkai, were arrested in April 1941 and detained for about eight months during the wartime repression of Surrealism. After their arrests, the association's exhibitions increasingly featured war-related work, and the group took part in activities supporting the war effort.

== See also ==
- Photography in Japan
- Surrealism in Japan
- Kiyoji Ōtsuji
- Ichirō Fukuzawa
- Shūzō Takiguchi
- Kansuke Yamamoto
- VIVI (photography group)
- Nagoya Photo Avant-Garde
- Kaigai Chōgenjitsushugi Sakuhinten
- Surrealism
- Peace Preservation Law
- Special Higher Police
