= Jikken Kōbō =

Japanese art collective

Jikken Kōbō (実験工房, official English name: "Experimental Workshop") was one of the first avant-garde artist collectives active in postwar Japan. It was founded in Tokyo in 1951 by a group of artists working in various media. Until its disbandment in 1957, a total of fourteen members participated in the group. Members were typically in their twenties and hailed from different backgrounds – the group included not just visual artists and musicians, but also a printmaker, a lighting designer, an engineer, and others. The art critic Shūzō Takiguchi was the key mentor and promoter of the group.

Jikken Kōbō organized its own exhibitions of group members' works, which were influenced by Western avant-garde art and showed a strong interest in new technology. However, they are best known for their collaborative "presentations" (happyōkai 発表会): theatrical or musical performances where each member contributed their individual works to create a multimedia production.

== Origin ==
Jikken Kōbō was formed by a group of young artists and creators. Original members included visual artists Hideko Fukushima, Katsuhiro Yamaguchi, and Shōzō Kitadai; music composers Tōru Takemitsu, Hiroyoshi Suzuki, Keijiro Satō, and Kazuo Fukushima; the poet Kuniharu Akiyama, the lighting designer Naoji Imai, and the engineer Hideo Yamazaki. Fukushima, Yamaguchi, and Kitadai had attended the Modern Art Summer Lectures in 1948 and were mentees of the art critic Shūzō Takiguchi. Prior to the official formation of the group, many members had befriended each other and had been meeting to listen to music and to discuss art. Kitadai explained that "out of this spontaneously grew the desire: we want an occasion to work in collaboration!" The group adopted the name "Jikken Kōbō" ("Experimental Workshop") at the recommendation of Takiguchi.

=== Manifesto ===
Jikken Kōbō did not publish an official manifesto, but prior to their first collaborative project in 1951 – a ballet production titled The Joy of Life and inspired by Picasso – they did write a provisional group agreement. They wrote that their aim was "to combine the various art forms, reaching an organic combination that could not be realized within the combinations of a gallery exhibition, and to create a new style of art with social relevance closely related to everyday life." The agreement explained that the group would create painting, objects, ballet, music, single pieces and combined works. Rather than presenting works separately, their exhibitions should be spaces where "the works are organically interrelated. They are not presented as single entities."

== Method ==
=== Collaboration ===
Jikken Kōbō worked on their artistic efforts in a collaborative manner that has been characterized as a comparatively loose and diffuse collective, where individual members had few obvious similarities other than a desire to experiment. Kitadai notably argued that even if their group experiments failed, they would not be disappointed as they still "succeeded in collaborating." Group member Yamaguchi characterized the collaboration of Jikken Kōbō as a dynamic tension between individual works and group projects: "The energy of [Jikken Kōbō] always radiated in both centripetal and centrifugal directions. By centripetal I mean an inward movement away from the outer directed teamwork of the group, a return to the individual work. By centrifugal I mean the attempt to combine work in the various fields of art, music, and literature logically necessary ideas."

=== New media and technologies ===
Jikken Kōbō's works drew inspiration from a wide variety of Western avant-garde practices including Cubism, Constructivism, Surrealism, and the Bauhaus. Their mentor Takiguchi was a key figure in prewar Japanese Surrealism and offered a direct connection to these prewar avant-gardes. Inspired by Bauhaus master László Moholy-Nagy, Jikken Kōbō was interested in incorporating new media and technology into their experiments. For this reason, Jikken Kōbō has also been compared to the Independent Group in postwar England – both groups referenced science fiction and technology relevant to the rapidly modernizing postwar era. Jikken Kōbō also shares similarities with Experiments in Art and Technology (E.A.T.), an American organization that provided technical assistance to avant-garde artists working with new technologies. Both Jikken Kōbō and E.A.T. were collaborative and multidisciplinary.

In this spirit, artists from the Jikken Kōbō collaborated on a series of photographs of mixed media collages for the publication Asahi Picture News in 1953. Jikken Kōbō artists collaborated with the filmmaker Toshio Matsumoto on his first film, Ginrin (Silver Wheels), in 1955. Kitadai and Yamaguchi assisted with the direction, and Suzuki and Takemitsu produced the music. The film is often considered the first special effects color film in Japan.

=== Japanese traditional arts ===
Jikken Kōbō group members also worked with elements of traditional Japanese culture including Zen and nō theater. This interest was piqued by Akiyama's correspondence with the American composer John Cage, who himself was inspired by Zen and Japanese music. For this reason, Jikken Kōbō's group works have been characterized by their embrace of both experimentation and tradition. The nō play the group created in collaboration with Takechi Tetsuji, Pierrot Lunaire, is an important example of their avant-garde interests combining with Japanese tradition. It was performed at the presentation An Evening of Original Plays by the Circular Theater in 1955.

== Influence ==
Jikken Kōbō's The 5th Experimental Workshop Presentation (1953) is cited as an important early postwar art project for its experimentation with new technologies. Works in the presentation were presented using either the automatic slide projector or the tape recorder, both technologies which had recently been developed by Tokyo Tsūshin Kōgyō (precursor to Sony).The presentation featured several "auto-slide" works projected on to screens in the theatre, accompanied by pre-recorded audio tracks. These works ultimately focused on creating a unique experience for the audience. The 5th Presentation is also considered an early "intermedia" endeavor that set the stage for later experiments with technology and new media in Japan.

The group disbanded in late 1957, but many of its members continued to work independently and helped influence the trajectory of Japanese avant-garde art in the 1960s and after. Group member Jōji Yuasa credited Jikken Kōbō with being the catalyst for new experiments and collaborations, recalling that it was "a crucible, a magnetic field of youthful, fresh spirit and individuality," and that "it was a valuable source of encouragement and stimulating interaction." In 2013, Dale Eisinger of Complex ranked The Joy of Life (1951) the 21st best work of performance art in history.

Jikken Kōbō has often been paired with the Gutai collective as two examples of avant-garde art groups who created cross-genre or interdisciplinary projects, exhibitions, and performances in early postwar Japan. However, in contrast to Gutai, which has been the subject of several major English-language books and exhibitions, historically Jikken Kōbō has not been as well known outside of Japan.

== Significant works ==
Jikken Kōbō members worked both collaboratively and independently. Their collaborative projects were often performances or concerts. Their more traditional gallery exhibitions still folded in musical components and can also be considered collaborative projects. The division between exhibition and collective artwork was not clear. The works listed below are performances, concerts, exhibitions, and other projects on which the majority of group members collaborated.

- 1951 - Picasso Festival: Ballet "Joie de Vivre" (First Experimental Workshop Presentation), Hibiya Kōkaidō Hall, Tokyo
- 1952 - The 2nd Experimental Workshop Presentation "Contemporary Music Concert," Joshi Gakuin Auditorium, Tokyo
- 1952 - The 3rd Experimental Workshop Presentation "Plastic Arts Exhibition," Takemiya Gallery, Tokyo
- 1952 - "Work A" and "Work B" (plywood reliefs)
- 1952 - The 4th Experimental Workshop Presentation in Commemoration of Takahiro Sonoda's Visit to Europe "Contemporary Works Concert," Joshi Gakuin Auditorium, Tokyo
- 1953 - Asahi Picture News header series (mixed media construction photographs)
- 1953 - The 5th Experimental Workshop Presentation, Daiichi Seimei Hall, Tokyo
- 1954 - Experimental Workshop "Arnold Schoenberg Concert," Yamaha Hall, Tokyo
- 1955 - Ballet Experimental Theater, Haiyūza Theater, Tokyo
- 1955 - An Evening of Original Plays by the Circular Theater, Sankei International Conference Hall, Tokyo
- 1955 - Looking Down into the Bottom of the Ravines from the Country of the Gods, Nichigeki Music Hall, Tokyo
- 1956 - Musique Concrète/Electronic Music Audition, Yamaha Hall, Tokyo
- 1956 - Summer Exhibition for the Enjoyment of a New Vision and Space by the Members of Experimental Workshop, Fūgetsu-dō, Tokyo
- 1957 - Summer Exhibition by the Members of Experimental Workshop, Fūgetsu-dō, Tokyo

== Participants ==
Founding members are noted with an asterisk.

- Shōzō Kitadai (painter, photographer)*
- Hideko Fukushima (painter)*
- Katsuhiro Yamaguchi (painter)*
- Tetsurō Komai (printmaker) - joined after founding
- Kazuo Fukushima (music composer)*
- Keijiro Satō (music composer)*
- Hiroyoshi Suzuki (music composer)*
- Tōru Takemitsu (music composer)*
- Jōji Yuasa (music composer) - joined after founding
- Kuniharu Akiyama (poet and critic)*
- Kiyoji Ōtsuji (photographer) - joined after founding
- Naoji Imai (lighting designer)*
- Takahiro Sonoda (pianist) - participated briefly
- Hideo Yamazaki (engineer)*

== General references ==
- Kanagawa Prefectural Museum of Modern Art, et al., eds. Jikken Kōbō ten – sengo geijutsu o kirihiraku / Jikken Kōbō: Experimental Workshop. Tokyo: Yomiuri Shinbun-sha, 2013. Exhibition catalogue.
- Mermod, Melanie and Obinata Kin'ichi, eds. APN Research. Bern: Kunsthalle Bern, 2012. Exhibition catalogue.
- Satani Garō, ed. Jikken kōbō to Takiguchi Shūzō / Experimental Workshop: The 11th Exhibition Homage to Shūzō Takiguchi. Tokyo: Satani Gallery, 1991. Exhibition catalogue.
- Tezuka, Miwako. "Experimentation and Tradition: The Avant-Garde Play Pierrot Lunaire by Jikken Kōbō and Takechi Tetsuji." Art Journal 70:3 (Fall 2011): 65-85.
- Tezuka, Miwako. "Jikken Kōbō and Takiguchi Shūzō: The New Deal Collectivism of 1950s Japan." positions east asia critique 21:2 (Spring 2013): 351-381.
