= Kariya City Art Museum =

- 刈谷市美術館
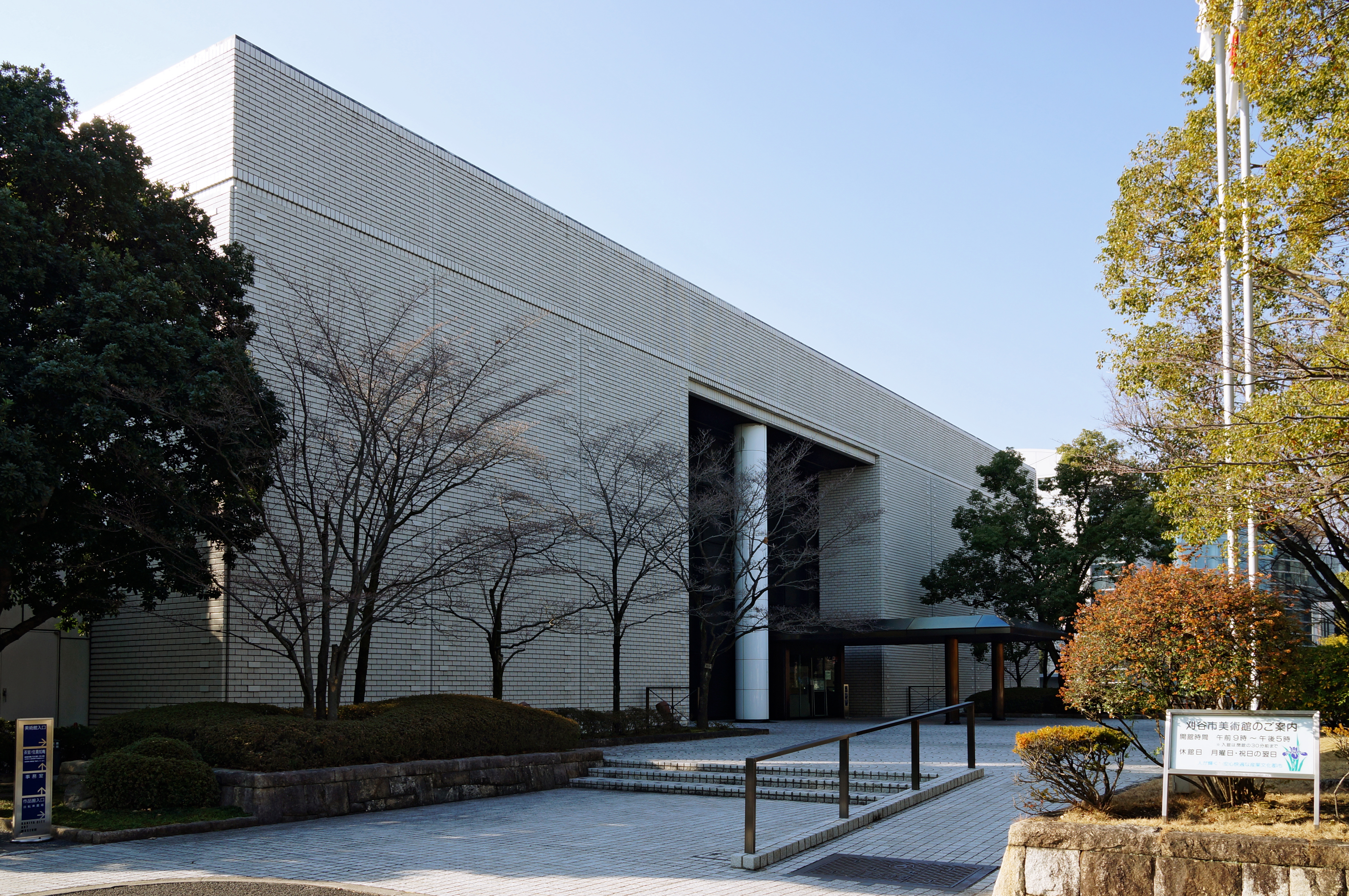
- Interactive map of the Kariya City Art Museum area

General information
- Location: 4-5 Sumiyoshi-chō, Kariya, Aichi Prefecture, Japan
- Coordinates: 34°59′10″N 137°00′26″E
- Opened: 11 June 1983

Website
- Official website

Kariya City Art Museum (刈谷市美術館, Kariya-shi Bijutsukan) opened in Kariya, Aichi Prefecture, Japan in 1983. The collection focuses on local, modern, post-war, and contemporary art, and includes some 3,441 works by 168 artists, as of April 2020.

== See also ==
- List of Cultural Properties of Japan - paintings (Aichi)
- List of Historic Sites of Japan (Aichi)
- Aichi Arts Center
