= Toyohashi City Museum of Art and History =

Coordinates: 34°46′09″N 137°23′41″E

- 豊橋市美術博物館
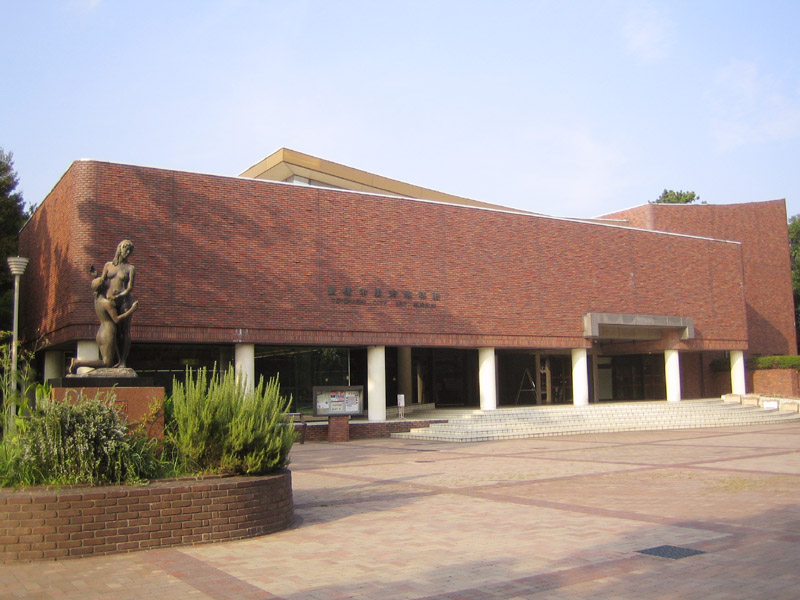
- Toyohashi City Art Museum
- Established: June 1, 1979
- Location: Toyohashi, Aichi, Japan
- Website: www.toyohaku.gr.jp/bihaku

The Toyohashi City Museum of Art and History (豊橋市美術博物館, Toyohashi-shi Bijutsu Hakubutsukan) is a purpose-built municipal art museum and local cultural museum in Toyohashi, Aichi Prefecture, Japan. It opened in 1979.

The permanent collections of the museum are concentrated around five themes:

1. Archaeological finds from local shell middens, kofun and ancient ceramic kilns in the Toyohashi area.
2. Cultural artifacts from Edo period and Meiji period sericulture and daily articles.
3. Ceramics from the Edo and Meiji periods used for serving sake (collection of Tadashi Tsukasa).
4. Documents from the Edo period from the local Ōkōchi clan.
5. Yōga style paintings by local artists or by modern Japanese artists depicting themes of local interest.

The building is a two-story ferroconcrete construction, with two display rooms downstairs and five display rooms upstairs. The museum is in Toyohashi Park, near Yoshida Castle in downtown Toyohashi.
