= Joji Yuasa =

Japanese composer (1929–2024)

- 湯浅譲二
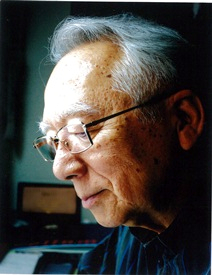
- Born: 12 August 1929; Koriyama, Fukushima, Japan
- Died: 21 July 2024 (aged 94)
- Other name: George Yuasa
- Occupation: composer
- Years active: 1952–2024

Joji Yuasa (湯浅譲二, Yuasa Jōji; 12 August 1929 – 21 July 2024) was a Japanese composer of contemporary classical music.

== Early life and education ==
Joji Yuasa was born in Kōriyama, Fukushima on 12 August 1929, and was a self-taught composer. He first became interested in music while a pre medical student at Keio University, and in 1952 he joined a young artists’ group Jikken Kōbō (Experimental Workshop, 1951–1957) in Tokyo, an organization for the exploration of new directions in the arts, including multimedia.

== Career ==
From 1981 to 1994 he was a music researcher and professor at the University of California, San Diego, where was later professor emeritus. He also served as a guest professor at the Tokyo College of Music from 1981, a professor at Nihon University from 1993, and an honorary member of the International Society for Contemporary Music. Yuasa is the recipient of a 1996 Suntory Music Award.

Yuasa wrote a wide range of compositions, including orchestral, choral and chamber music, music for theatre, and intermedia, electronic and computer music. His style has been described as "consistent explorations of a distinctive, maverick yet elegant voice" that has elements of twelve tone, impressionism, romantic, and traditional classical composition.

As a guest composer and lecturer, he contributed to the Festival of the Arts of This Century in Hawaii (1970), New Music Concerts in Toronto (1980), Asian Composers League in Hong Kong (1981), concert tour for Contemporary Music Network by British Arts Council (1981), Asia Pacific Festival in New Zealand (1984), Composers Workshop in Amsterdam (1984), Darmstadt Summer Course for Contemporary Music (1988), Lerchenborg Music Tage (1986, 1988), the Pacific Music Festival in Sapporo (1990), and Music of Japan Today: Tradition and Innovation (Hamilton College, NY - 1992).

== Death ==
Yuasa died from pneumonia on 21 July 2024, at the age of 94.

== Selected commissions ==
His works have been commissioned by the Koussevitzky Music Foundation, Saarland Radio Symphony Orchestra, Helsinki Philharmonic Orchestra, Japan Philharmonic Orchestra, NHK Symphony Orchestra, Canada Council, Suntory Music Foundation, IRCAM and National Endowment for the Arts of the U.S.A.

== Selected fellowships and awards ==
He received a number of fellowships and awards, from: Japan Society Fellowship (1968–69), Composer in Residence at the Center for Music Experiment UCSD (1976), Berlin Artist Program by DAAD (1976–77), the New South Wales Conservatorium of Music in Sydney (1980), the University of Toronto (1981) and IRCAM (1987).
