= Noboru Ueki =

Japanese photographer

- Born: July 5, 1905; Fukuyama City, Hiroshima Prefecture, Japan
- Died: 1991 (aged 85–86)
- Occupation: Photographer
- Organization: Kyoto Photo Society Nihon Koga Kyokai Bijutsu Bunka Kyokai

Noboru Ueki (植木 昇, Ueki Noboru; 1905–1991) was a renowned Japanese photographer.

He was born in Hiroshima Prefecture as the second son. His father operated a photography studio. He studied professional photography at a photo studio ran by photographer Ryutaro Kono in Kyoto city. With an investment from his wife's family, in 1934 he established Noboru Hiroi Photography Studio in the Karasuma district in Kyoto. The name of his photo studio paid homage to his family in law that invests in him but later in 1946, he renamed the studio the Noboru Ueki Photo Studio.

For his photographs, Ueki used a Vestan camera which had been popular in Japan in the beginning of the Showa Era (1926-1989). This was a smaller version of the Vest Pocket Kodak which was very popular during World War I. Many soldiers recorded their experiences using this small camera which contributed to the global boom in camera sales. This boom in spurred the growth of organizations that promoted photography as a fine art and not just a hobby or commercial activity. Photography in Japan followed a similar trajectory which was a big influence on Ueki.

He was a central member of the Nihon Koga Kyokai and the Kyoto Photo Society (K.P.S.). Most of the members were commercial photographers and produced portrait photos in their photo studios. Ueki produced these kinds of portraits but also experimented with more avant-garde work using hand coloring techniques where he would paint directly onto his photographs. He also experimented with soft-soft focus and deformation techniques. His photographs were featured in various Japanese photography magazines like Photo Times and Shashin to Gijutsu (Photography and Technology). In an essay published in a photo magazine, Ueki described his avant-garde aspirations:

We are portrait photographers by trade, but to think that this means we only need to understand portraits, or to remain in the dark about anything else would be limiting as a photographer. It would also leave photographers without any credibility in the social relevance of photography, therefore we are diligent in our research and study of photography and its functions.

== Exhibitions ==
- 1948-1949: Jiyu Shashin Bijyutsuten "(Free Photographic Art Exhibition)", 1948-1949, Kyoto Maruzen Gallery and Osaka Mitsukoshi department story, Kyoto, Japan and Osaka, Japan
- 1951: Kyoto Fubutsu Shashinten, Ueno Matsuzakaya department story, Tokyo, Japan
- 1956: 1st International Subjective Photography, Nihonbashi Branch of Takashimaya department store, Tokyo Japan
- 1958: Japan Subjectivism Photography, Fuji Photo Salon, Tokyo, Japan
- 1973: 3rd Kyoto Shashin Geijutsuten "(Kyoto Photographic Art Exhibition)", Kyoto Prefectural Center for Arts and Culture, Kyoto, Japan
- 1995: The Age of Modernism, Tokyo Photographic Art Museum, Tokyo, Japan
- 1999: Master Works, Master Photographers - Part 1: From Photography's Introduction to the 1950's, Tokyo Photographic Art Museum, Tokyo, Japan
- 2001: Cho-genjitsu to Jojo "(Surrealism and Lyricism)", Fuji Photo Salon, Osaka, Japan
- 2007: 100-Year History of Photographers in Kansai, Hyogo Prefectural Museum of Art, Private Exhibition Gallery, Kobe, Japan
- 2008: Surrealism and Photography - Beauty Convulsed, Tokyo Photographic Art Museum, Tokyo, Japan
- 2011: Masterpieces of Japanese Pictorial Photography, Tokyo Photographic Art Museum, Tokyo, Japan
- 2019: K.P.S. Noboru Ueki And Yushi Kobayashi Joint Exhibition, MEM Gallery, Tokyo, Japan; Paris Photo, Paris, France

== Permanent collections ==
- The J. Paul Getty Museum
- Tokyo Photographic Art Museum
