= Katsuhiro Yamaguchi =

Japanese artist and art theorist (1928–2018)

- 山口勝弘
- Born: 22 April 1928; Tokyo
- Died: 2 May 2018 (aged 90)
- Education: Nihon University
- Occupations: Avant-garde artist, Teacher, Art Theorist
- Employers: University of Tsukuba; Kobe University of Design
- Organizations: Shichiyōkai Group; Avant Garde Research Group; Yoru no Kai; Pouvoir; Jikken Kōbō; Enbairamento no Kai; Nihon Denki Geijutsu Kyōkai
- Known for: Interdisciplinary Avant-garde art; Co-founding Jikken Kōbō
- Notable work: 環境芸術家キースラー (1978); Electromagica ’69: International Psytech Art (1969); Las Meninas and Video Landscape (Bienal de São Paulo, 1974)
- Style: Avant-garde; Machine Aesthetic; Sculpture; Video installation
- Movement: Constructivism; Bauhaus; Modernism

Katsuhiro Yamaguchi (山口勝弘, Yamaguchi Katsuhiro; 22 April 1928—2 May 2018) was a Japanese artist and art theorist based in Tokyo and Yokohama. Through his collaborations, writings, and teaching, he promoted an interdisciplinary avant-garde in postwar Japan that served as the foundation for the emergence of Japanese media art in the early 1980s, a field in which he remained active until his death. He represented Japan at the 1968 Venice Biennale and the 1975 Bienal de São Paulo, and served as producer for the Mitsui Pavilion at Expo '70 in Osaka.

== Biography ==
Katsuhiro Yamaguchi was born in Tokyo in 1928 to a lawyer's family. His father was an arts enthusiast, often taking Yamaguchi to museums. His family home in the Ōimachi district also featured an annex designed by and decorated with paintings by the modernist Japanese painter Seiji Tōgō, although it was severely damaged by bombing during the war. Art historian Toshiharu Omuka argues that the remaining photographs of Tōgō's design show clear influences of the machine aesthetic that held a growing sway in 1920s Europe, when Tōgō was based in Paris. Omuka thus posits this annex as a possible source of Yamaguchi's interest in industrial materials, urban space, and modernist forms reminiscent of Bauhaus design.

=== 1950s ===
Despite having no formal training in the arts, Yamaguchi was already active even before graduating from the Department of Law at Nihon University in 1951. He participated in the Avant-Garde Artists' Club's Summer Modern Art Seminar in July 1948 and formed the Shichiyōkai group with Shōzō Kitadai and Hideko Fukushima, among others, in August 1948. Shichiyōkai members, including Yamaguchi, also formed the Avant Garde Research Group under Kiyoteru Hanada and Tarō Okamoto in 1948, but by 1949 they had merged—alongside the Century Society (Seiki no Kai)—into the Night Society (Yoru no Kai), a discussion and exhibition group active since 1947. Crucially, Century Society and Yoru no Kai were explicitly trans-disciplinary groups that included members from different areas of the arts, such as writer Kōbō Abe, poet Hiroshi Sekine, filmmaker Hiroshi Teshigahara, artist Tarō Okamoto, and critic Kiyoteru Hanada. In 1950, Yamaguchi, Kitadai, Fukushima, and Tatsuo Ikeda left the painting section of Yoru no Kai to form yet another group called Pouvoir. Yamaguchi's perspective on art was further tempered by exposure to materials on László Moholy-Nagy, György Kepes, and other modernists through the American-run CIE Library at GHQ during the American occupation. The combination of these distinct but inter-related experiences helped Yamaguchi solidify a commitment to the potentials of a cross-disciplinary collaborative approach to artmaking that he then put into practice as a member of the seminal group Jikken Kōbō.

Yamaguchi co-founded Jikken Kōbō in 1951 alongside artists Shōzō Kitadai, and Hideko Fukushima; composers Tōru Takemitsu, Jōji Yūasa, Kazuo Fukushima, Keijirō Satō, Suzuki Hiroyoshi, and Tetsurō Komai; poet Kuniharu Akiyama; photographer Kiyoji Ōtsuji; lighting designer Naoji Imai; pianist Takahiro Sonoda; and engineer Hideo Yamazaki. The group took the surrealist poet and art critic Shūzō Takiguchi as its mentor, but their own approach was equally inspired by Bauhaus and Constructivism. As a member of Jikken Kōbo, Yamaguchi performed in plays, co-created innovative audio-synchronized slide shows, helped design several iterations of the photographic APN series published in the mass-media magazine Asahi Graph, and developed his shadowbox Vitrine series. Yamaguchi would continue to collaborate on occasion with several of the creators he worked with in Jikken Kōbō—Takemitsu Tōru, Satō Keijirō, Takiguchi Shūzō, and non-member Jikken Kōbō collaborator Toshio Matsumoto—over the decades following the group's dissolution. The Vitrine series, proved the most enduring result of Yamaguchi's Jikken Kōbō era. Inspired by the form of shop windows the shadowboxes in this series consisted of paintings on glass panels placed behind two corrugated glass oriented cross-ways to create a refracting grid; as viewers move relative to the vitrines, the painted patterns shift. These more architectural painterly objects provided Yamagichi the chance to collaborate with architects including Kiyoshi Seike and Kenzō Tange as he embedded the vitrines into concrete wall structures or expanded them into wall-sized light-box partitions.

=== 1960s ===
By the 1960s Yamaguchi was experimenting with more sculptural works and experimenting with the contingent relationship between object and space. On a 1961 visit to New York, he met Frederick Kiesler at his studio, which led him to produce a fifteen-part series of articles on Kiesler's life and work for the major art magazine Bijutsu Techō between January 1976 and March 1977, eventually published in book form in 1978. He began producing wire sculptures wrapped in sack cloth from commercial product packaging, magnetic sculptures with re-arrangeable parts, and acrylic sculptures lit from within. At this time he was active in several groups including the Environment Society (Enbairamento no Kai), which put together the 1966 exhibition From Space to Environment, and the Japan Electric Arts Association (Nihon Denki Geijutsu Kyōkai), through which he organized the 1969 exhibition Electromagica ’69: International Psytech Art. He also occasionally participated in Fluxus-related events, such as the 1966 Happening for Sightseeing Bus Trip in Tokyo and Expose ’68: Say Something Now, I’m Looking for Something to Say. During the latter half of the decade, Yamaguchi began to articulate an idea of expanded sculpture in his 1967 book Futeikei Bijutsu-ron (Theory of Indeterminate Art), exhibited in the Venice Biennale (1968), and became commissioner for the Mitsui Pavilion at Expo ’70.

=== 1970s ===
Yamaguchi described his experience at Expo ’70 as eye opening, motivating him to shift gears, and leading him to take up the medium of video, with which he had begun experimenting in the late 1960s, in earnest. In 1972 he co-founded the Tokyo-based video collective Video Hiroba alongside Fujiko Nakaya, Hakudō Kobayashi, Nobuhiro Kawanaka, Masao Kōmura, Toshio Matsumoto, Rikurō Miyai, Shoko Matsushita, Yoshiaki Tōno, Keigo Yamamoto, Sakumi Hagiwara, and Michitaka Nakahara, among others. With this group he developed what art historian Jung-Yeon Ma describes as “video as a social medium,” focused on the concept of communication through both experimental group exhibitions and community projects. Aside from the group activities of Video Hiroba, Yamaguchi also began making video installations, such as his Las Meninas and Video Landscape, both shown at the Bienal de São Paulo in 1974. By the late 1970s Yamaguchi was developing his concept of the Imaginarium that would serve as inspiration for his environmental sculptures of the 1980s and ‘90s. Aside from his work as an artist, he also began teaching as a professor in the School of Art and Design at University of Tsukuba, where he remained until 1992.

=== 1980s ===
From the 1980s on Yamaguchi became one of the central figures of the media art scene in Japan, with his contributions featuring prominently in a January 1982 issue of the premiere art magazine Bijutsu Techō devoted to the “Media Revolution." His work during the 1980s focused on media installations and performances, and included projects for public locations such as the Seibu Department Store, the Seibu (later Parco) Theater, and the entrance to the O Museum of Art in Osaki New City, Tokyo. In 1981 he formed the group “Art-Unis” to help promote technological art and support young artists. He also became a founding director of the International Biennial in Nagoya—Artec from 1989 through 1997.

=== 1990s–2018 ===
Yamaguchi retired from University of Tsukuba in 1992 and began teaching at the Kobe University of Design in 1993 where he remained until 1999. He also established a studio on the island of Awaji in the 1990s, and was involved in the development of a multi-arts center on the island. He continued to show both in Japan and internationally during this decade, and continued his media collaborations with artists and dancers. In 2001 he was struck with a sudden illness that left him partially disabled and shifted his practice from media art to drawings and paintings produced by hand. A major retrospective of his work was held at The Museum of Modern Art, Kamakura and The Museum of Modern Art, Ibaraki in 2006, and research projects such as the government funded “Art and Technology in Postwar Japan” project have produced scholarship that has secured Yamaguchi recognition as a central figure of Japanese media art. Exhibitions featuring Jikken Kōbō (The Museum of Modern Art, Kamakura; Setagaya Art Museum, Tokyo; The Museum of Modern Art, Toyama; Iwaki City Art Museum, Iwaki; Kitakyushu Municipal Museum of Art, Kitakyūshū, 2013) and Video Hiroba (Mori Art Museum Research Project, 2016) have made such research more available to the public, while his prominence in Jung-Yeon Ma’s 2014 book Nihon Media Āto-shi (A Critical History of Media Art in Japan) and the appearance of a selected collection of his numerous writings, edited by art and design historian Toshino Iguchi, indicate the continued interest in his ideas within the Japanese media arts and fine arts scenes.

== Selected group and solo exhibitions ==
Sources:

- 1st through 13th, and 15th Yomiuri Independent Exhibitions, Tokyo Metropolitan Art Museum, 1949–1961 and 1963
- Abstraction & Fantasy , the Museum of Modern Art, Tokyo, 1953
- The International Art of A New Era, Takashimaya Department Store, Osaka, 1958
- Off Museum Exhibition, Tsubaki Kindai Gallery, Tokyo, 1964
- Color and Space, curated by Yoshiaki Tōnō, Minami Gallery, Tokyo, 1966
- From Space to Environment, Matsuya Department Store, Ginza, Tokyo, 1966
- The 5th International Guggenheim Exhibition: Sculpture in the 1960s, Guggenheim Museum, New York, 1967
- Japan Pavilion four-person exhibition, curated by Ichirō Hariu, The 34th Venice Biennale, Venice, Italy, 1968
- Fluorescent Chrysanthemum, Institute of Contemporary Arts, London, 1968
- Electromagica ’69: International Psytech Art, Sony Building, Ginza, Tokyo, 1969 (organizer and exhibiting artist)
- Mitsui Pavilion (commissioner), Expo ’70, Osaka, 1970
- Video Communication: Do-It-Yourself-Kit, Sony Building, Ginza, 1972
- Computer Art ’73, Sony Building, Ginza, 1973
- Tokyo-New York Video Express, Tenjo Sajiki, Tokyo, 1974
- International Computer Art Exhibition ’74, Sony Building, Ginza, 1974
- Video Art, Institute of Contemporary Art, Philadelphia, 1975 (travelling exhibition)
- 13th Bienal de São Paulo, São Paulo, Brazil, 1975
- 4th International Open Encounter on Video, CAYC, Buenos Aires, 1975
- 5th International Open Encounter on Video, ICC, Antwerp, 1976
- Yamaguchi Katsuhiro: Videorama, Minami Gallery, Tokyo and Sony Tower, Osaka, 1977
- Katsuhiro Yamaguchi: Environment Video Art, Anthology Film Archives, New York, 1978
- International Open Encounter on Video, Tokyo 1978, Sogetsu Hall, Tokyo, 1978
- Video Art from Japan and Germany, Fukuoka Culture Hall, Fukuoka; Fukui Fine Arts Museum, Fukui; Miyazaki University; Maki Gallery, Tokyo, 1977–78
- Video from Tokyo to Fukui and Kyoto, Museum of Modern Art, New York, 1979 (travelled to Tokyo, Kobe, Fukuoka, Osaka, and Sapporo)
- Yamaguchi Katsuhiro: Info-Environmental Video Sculpture, Tokyo Gallery, Tokyo, 1981
- Yamaguchi Katsuhiro: From Vitrine to Video, Kanagawa Prefectural Hall Gallery, Yokohama, 1981
- The 4th Sydney Biennale, Australia, 1982
- Yamaguchi Katsuhiro: Video Specatcle Future Garden, Homage to Takiguchi Shūzō, Tokyo Gallery, Tokyo, 1984
- Yamaguchi Katsuhiro: Video Spectacle Galaxy Garden, Hyogo Prefectural Museum of Modern Art, Hyogo and Laforet Museum Harajuku, Tokyo, 1986
- Japon des Avant-Gardes, Centre Georges Pompidou, Paris, 1986
- Japan Cultural Festival in Paris/Nouvelle Images au Japon, UNESCO Cinema Room, Paris, 1993
- Trace of Postwar Culture in Japan, Meguro Museum of Art, Tokyo; Hiroshima City Museum of Contemporary Art; Hyogo Prefectural Museum of Art, Kobe; Fukuoka Prefectural Museum of Art, Fukuoka, 1995
- Gwangju Biennale ’95, South Korea, 1995
- The 16th International Video Art Festival Retrospective of Katsuhiro Yamaguchi, Locarno, Switzerland, 1995
- Katsuhiro Yamaguchi, Nerima Art Museum, Tokyo, 1996
- Japanese Art: Revival of 1964, Museum of Contemporary Art, Tokyo, 1996
- The Library of Babel: Characters/Books/Media, NTT InterCommunication Center, Tokyo, 1998
- Sogetsu Art Center 1945–1970, Chiba City Museum of Art, Chiba, 1998
- From Darkness 2000 to Light, Nizayama Forest Art Museum, Toyama, 2000
- Yamaguchi Katsuhiro: 1950s—Drawings for Vitrine, Shigeru Yokota Gallery, Tokyo, 2004
- Pioneer of Media Art Yamaguchi Katsuhiro: From “Experimental Workshop” to Teatrine, The Museum of Modern Art, Kamakura and The Museum of Modern Art, Ibaraki, 2006
- Experimental Workshop: Japan, 1951–58, Annely Juda Fine Art, London, 2009
- Vital Signals: Early Japanese Video Art, Electronic Arts Intermix, New York, 2010
- Jikken Kōbō, Bétonsalon, Paris, 2011
- Tokyo 1955–1970, Museum of Modern Art, New York, 2012
- Jikken Kōbō—Experimental Workshop, The Museum of Modern Art, Kamakura; Setagaya Art Museum, Tokyo; The Museum of Modern Art, Toyama; Iwaki City Art Museum, Iwaki; Kitakyushu Municipal Museum of Art, Kitakyūshū, 2013
- Katsuhiro Yamaguchi, Annely Juda Fine Art, London, 2013
- Yamaguchi Katsuhiro, Yokohama Civic Art Gallery, Yokohama, 2014
- Taro Okamoto and Media Art, Taro Okamoto Museum of Art, Kawasaki, 2017
- Katsuhiro Yamaguchi 1928–2018, Kawamura Memorial DIC Museum of Art, Chiba, 2019

== Publications ==
- Futeikei Bijutsu-ron (Theory of Indeterminate Art) – Gakugei Shorin, 1967
- Kankyō Geijutsuka Kīsurā (Environmental Artist Kiesler) – Bijutsu Shuppansha, 1978
- Sakuhinshū: Yamaguchi Katsuhiro 360° (Catalogue of Works: Yamaguchi Katsuhiro 360°) – Asahi Shuppansha, 1981
- Tsumetai Pafōmansu: Posuto-Modān Kōgi (Cool Performance: Post-Modern Lecture), co-authored with Shimizu Tōru – Asahi Shuppansha, 1983
- Robotto Avan-Gyarudo: 20-seiki Geijutsu to Kikai (Robot Avant-Garde: Twentieth Century Art and the Machine) – PARCO Shuppan-kyoku, 1985
- Pafōmansu Genron (Discussion of Performance) – Asahi Shuppansha, 1985
- Eizō Kūkan Sōzō (Creating Image Spaces) – Bijutsu Shuppansha, 1987
- Media Jidai no Tenjinmatsuri (Grand Festival of the Media Age) – Bijutsu Shuppansha, 1992
- UBU Yūbuyū (UBU Play-Non-Play) – Zeppan Shobō, 1992 IMAGINARIUM – Zeppan Shobō, 1992

== Major public collections and commissions ==
- Aichi Prefectural Museum of Art, Nagoya
- Artizon Museum, Ishibashi Foundation, Tokyo
- Chiba City Museum of Art
- Fukuoka Art Museum
- Hara Museum of Contemporary Art, Tokyo
- Hiroshima City Museum of Contemporary Art, Hiroshima
- Hyogo Prefectural Museum of Art, Kobe
- Iwaki City Art Museum, Iwaki
- Kawamura Memorial DIC Museum of Art, Chiba
- Kawasaki City Museum, Kawasaki
- M+ Museum, Hong Kong
- Miyagi Museum of Art, Sendai
- Museum of Contemporary Art, Tokyo
- The Museum of Modern Art, Kamakura & Hayama
- Museum of Modern Art, New York
- The Museum of Modern Art, Saitama
- Museum of Modern Art, Tokyo
- The National Museum of Art, Osaka
- The O Museum of Art, Tokyo
- Setagaya Art Museum, Tokyo
- Seto Ohashi Commemorative Hall and Exhibition Space, Sakaide, Kagawa Prefecture
- Tate, London
- Tokyo Metropolitan Art Museum
- Toyama Prefectural Museum of Art and Design
- Vancouver Art Gallery, Vancouver
- Walker Art Center, Minneapolis
