= Tōzaburō Ono =

Fujisaburō Ono (小野 藤三郎, Ono Fujisaburō; July 27, 1903 – October 8, 1996), better known as Tōzaburō Ono (小野 十三郎, Ono Tōzaburō), was a Japanese poet and anarchist known for his critique of lyric poetry and as an advocate of long, rational poems.

== Biography ==
Fujisaburō was born on July 27, 1903, to a wealthy family in the Naniwa-ku, Osaka. Although he spent a large part of his childhood in Nara, he experienced the era of worker discontent during his middle school years. He enrolled in Toyo University and moved to Tokyo, but soon abandoned his studies.

He established a connection with anarchist magazine Aka to Kuro (Red and Black), publishing his first article under the pseudonym Tōzaburō in the final issue of the magazine in 1924. That same year, he founded his own anarchist, Dadaist magazine Dam-Dam, but only published one issue before ceasing. In 1926, he self-published his first book of poems, "Hanbun Hiraita Mado" ("A Half-Opened Window"), and married the following year. In 1930 he and another anarchist poet, Kiyoshi Akiyama, founded another magazine, Dando (Trajectory), but again it only ran for a short time.

He returned to Osaka in 1933 and published works such as "Furuki Sekai no ue ni" ("Above the Old World"), "Osaka", "Shiron" ("Essays on Poetry"), "Juyu Fuji" ("Heavy Oil Fuji"), most of which were set in the local industry and urban of Osaka. He was involved in the Japanese government's crackdown on anarchists in 1935 and was detained for 40 days. He turned more and more to socialist realism in his writing, with strong criticism of lyrical poetry that lacked a critical spirit and advocate of rational long poems, which became part of the culture of the Kansai region.

He received a series of awards one after another, including the Osaka Prefectural Culture Prize, the Osaka Citizen's Culture Prize, and the 26th Yomiuri Prize. In December 1988, his wife died. He died on October 8, 1996, in Osaka.
