= Ryūichi Amano =

Japanese photographer

Ryūichi Amano (天野 龍一, Amano Ryūichi; 1902–1995) was a Japanese photographer. His interwar work was later included in the Osaka section of the Tokyo Photographic Art Museum exhibition Avant-Garde Rising: The Photographic Vanguard in Modern Japan.
