= Ichiro Fukuzawa =

Japanese modernist painter

- Born: Ichiro Fukuzawa; January 18, 1898; Tomioka-machi, Kitakanra-gun, Gunma Prefecture, Japan
- Died: October 16, 1992 (aged 94); Japan
- Known for: Introducing Surrealism to Japan
- Style: Surrealist, Expressionist, Modernist
- Movement: Surrealism

Ichiro Fukuzawa (January 18, 1898 – October 16, 1992) was a Japanese modernist painter credited with the establishment of Surrealism in Japan's artistic communities during the early 1930s.

While Surrealist artists are known for their distinct focus on the human subconsciousness and dreams, Fukuzawa's Western-style (yōga) paintings depart from such conventions by instead providing sharply satirical commentaries on human behavior and systemic social issues in Japan, including the Japanese occupation of Manchuria and the adverse impacts of the 1973 Oil Crisis on the Japanese economy. Since he was associated with Surrealism's progressive ideas, Fukuzawa's art became a contentious issue for the Japanese State that led to his subsequent imprisonment and forced him to pursue pro-Imperial subjects during the Second World War.

Fukuzawa's career was not limited to the Japanese islands as he traveled extensively across mainland Asia, Europe, the United States, and Australia where his exposure to key socio-political events and artistic styles influenced his later periods of creativity.

Despite his violation of the Peace Preservation Law during World War II, Fukuzawa is celebrated as one of only a few individuals in Japanese history to have been imprisoned for breaking national laws and to be regarded as a Person of Cultural Merit and the recipient of the Order of Culture within his lifetime.

== Early life ==
Fukuzawa was born in Tomioka-machi, Kitakanra-gun, Gunma Prefecture, Japan, to a wealthy family that owned multiple businesses within the silk and banking industries. In 1918, he entered Tokyo Imperial University to study literature, but departed prior to completion of his degree in order to learn sculpting at the studio of Fumio Asakura.

== Early career (1924–1931) ==
The affluence of Fukuzawa's family permitted him to study European art in France between 1924 and 1931. Paris was the nexus from which Fukuzawa found inspiration in European Surrealism, mainly through Max Ernst's collage series La Femme 100 Tetes (1929) and the paintings of Giorgio de Chirico. Fukuzawa's fascination with this highly influential European modern art movement compelled him to alter his preferred medium from sculpture to painting; Ernst's cut-outs of printed material and their reassemblage into entirely new works of art inspired Fukuzawa to apply the same technique to painting. Fukuzawa's intense attraction to Surrealism is directly attributed to his perceived connections between the movement and the traditional Japanese literary genres of haiku and koan. As haiku seeks to convey in short form descriptions of larger images, Fukuzawa likewise intended to express and extend through the confines of a finite painted canvas the magnitude of Surrealist thought.

== Return to Japan (1931–1939) ==
Fukuzawa's earliest Surrealist works were featured at The First Dokuritsu Bijutsu Kyokai (Independent Artists Association) in 1931, an exhibition that primarily highlighted younger, Fauvist-inspired Japanese artists. Fukuzawa exhibited 37 paintings under a "Special Submission" category to which he received a positive reception from both audiences and critics. Subsequent to this success, Fukuzawa then became a regular participant in future installments of the Dokuristu Bijutsu.

Throughout the decade, Fukuzawa's art morphed into the humorous and satirical style that forms the corpus of his work. Professors - Thinking About Other Things at Meetings (1931) is an archetypal example of his Surrealistic wit. A group of faceless professors is seated around a table engaged in academic discourse. Behind each man is a portrait that displays their innermost thoughts unrelated to the discussion (e.g. the foreground of one gentleman's portrait prominently features a woman's exposed breast).

In tandem with painting, Fukuzawa also penned numerous books and essays in Surrealism, a component of Kindai bijutsu shicho koza (1937), a seminal six-volume book series authored by Japan's leading artists on the latest developments in Japanese modernism. His writings on Surrealism's intellectual and artistic theories were disseminated to the socially-conscious, progressive views of avant-garde artists.

In 1939, Fukuzawa left the Dokuritsu Bijutsu Kyokai and founded Bijutsu Bunka Kyōkai (Art Culture Society), an alternative arts organization exclusively devoted to Surrealism.

== Northeast China (Japanese-occupied Manchuria) and opposition to the government (1932–1945) ==
As Japan became increasingly militarized, the government censored art deemed antithetical to the State's imperialist policies. In an attempt to avoid punishment, Fukuzawa altered the Surrealist characteristics of his works in a less overt manner that presented the illusion of a more favorable view of the Japanese State.

In 1932, Japan established the puppet state of Manchukuo in Northeast China, then colonially called Manchuria. Thereafter, Japanese artists regularly traveled to the area to produce State-sponsored images to further the nation's imperial ambitions. In reality, the ulterior motives for these artistic sojourns were often two-fold: (1) to demonstrate distance from avant-garde/politically left-wing movements, and (2) to advance their artistic status. Fukuzawa retained his anti-Imperial political beliefs and maintained support for Surrealism through paintings whose content was either thematically ambiguous or neutral in tone. He found inspiration in the vastness of the area's landscape, and he incorporated subtle criticisms pertaining to Japan's control of Manchukuo within romanticized scenes visually acceptable by the government for public arts consumption.

Oxen (1936) is one of the large-scale oil paintings Fukuzawa utilized to address the contradictions between Japan's idealization of "Manchuria" versus the social realities of poor Chinese and Korean peasants who resided under colonial rule. Two oxen are shown grazing in a field while two groups of people are clustered in the background. The seeming innocuousness of the scene is challenged by the presence of holes on the oxen that reveals the flimsiness of their skin. Scholars speculate the artificiality of the oxen was meant to evoke the weakness surrounding Japanese propagandistic idealization of "Manchuria" as a colony in which all races lived harmoniously. Social inequality is expressed in the contrast between the two groups of people. The first group of gray, emaciated figures is shown partaking in excruciating, backbreaking labor while the second group of pink-skinned nude individuals relax near the edge of a river. Fukuzawa's social critique highlights the inequities between Chinese laborers and the Russian bourgeoisie. The painting was not perceived as social criticism because the dominance of the landscape seemingly appeared to align with Japanese propaganda that marketed the region as an exotic, utopian paradise settlement.

By the late-1930s and early-1940s, Fukuzawa's disguised loyalty to the State became increasingly difficult to uphold as the government restricted artistic activities and censored the term “avant-garde”. The government targeted Surrealism for its promotion of introspection and emotions ran counter to imperialist messages that emphasized national collectiveness, anti-Western and Pan-Asian beliefs, and rejection of art for art's sake.

On April 5, 1941, Fukuzawa and art critic Shuzo Takiguchi were arrested and imprisoned by the Special Higher Police because the government viewed Surrealism as Communist propaganda. The case has since been described as one of the best-known incidents in the wartime repression of Japanese Surrealism. The incident occurred after authorities deemed Fukuzawa's art had violated the Peace Preservation Law (1925), a national policy designed to suppress political demonstrations or creative expression that espoused anti-imperial and pro-Western beliefs.

Following his release and throughout the remainder of the military conflict, Fukuzawa abandoned the Surrealist style and shifted his attention to floral still life and seascape war paintings. Of these, his 1945 painting Shipborne Special Unit Leaves the Base was one of few that specifically referenced Japan's military involvement. A lone Japanese soldier is portrayed on a patrol boat in the middle of a fierce storm. Similar to Oxen, this piece demonstrates Fukuzawa's ambivalence in the subject's relationship to the State's agenda. The National Museum of Modern Art, Tokyo's text on the work states the image was copied from a film still, and art historians interpret Fukuzawa's ambiguity to be an ironic pictorial statement on the futility of the war.

== Return to Surrealism (1945–1950) ==
Fukuzawa resumed his pre-1945 stylistic approach, but his paintings evolved into a thematically somber amalgamation of Surrealistic and Expressionist attributes. Dante Alighieri's 14th Century narrative poem The Divine Comedy contributed to this change as Fukuzawa incorporated violently disfigured bodies caught amid chaos, bloodshed, and misery. Moreover, the concept of Hell became a recurring theme throughout the remainder of his career.

Group of Figures Defeated in Battle (1948) is regarded as Fukuzawa's first major individualized painting post-1945. A pile of muscular, nude figures are piled onto one another in a barren desert landscape. The entanglement of the bodies’ limbs obscure their faces, and the composition's solemn and melancholic mood conveys Fukuzawa's acknowledgement of the devastating effects of war on human life.

== Global explorations (1950–1970) ==
On a quest for renewed artistic inspiration, Fukuzawa traveled extensively throughout Europe, the United States, Mexico, Latin America, Australia, and mainland Asia.

Fukuzawa's return to Europe in 1952 coincided with a major Pablo Picasso exhibition. Picasso's signature Cubist style coupled with Fukuzawa's studies of indigenous African and Latin American sculptures at the Musée de l'Homme led him to incorporate more abstracted figuration into his paintings, most recognizable in his "Latin American" series.

Visits to Mexico and Brazil to examine indigenous art in situ culminated in Fukuzawa's insertion of more visually dynamic color schemes during the mid-1950s and early-1960s. Man with a Watermelon (1955) employs a much brighter palette than any of his previous work as seen in the striking pinks, purples, and blues surrounding the central figure. The multicolored shapes that comprise the subject's body recall Picasso's Cubist dematerialization of three-dimensional forms.

The semi-figural subject of Leda (1962), a reference to Greek deity Zeus’s reincarnation as a swan, signified Fukuzawa's gradual departure from Expressionism. His application of representational forms coincided with his declaration to actively pursue "theme painting" (images of figurative subjects with an accompanying narrative).

Fukuzawa's visit to the United States in 1965 at the height of the Civil Rights Movement left an indelible mark on the thematic content of his later paintings. The groundbreaking activism of Black Americans to attain equal rights deeply resonated with the social justice-driven Fukuzawa. Derived from one of the many photographs he took of the predominantly black Harlem neighborhoods during his temporary New York residency, Woman with a Placard (1965) depicts a young woman holding a sign titled "JUSTICE" as she stands in front of a crowd of onlookers on a city street.

== Later career (1970–1992) ==
Fukuzawa's paintings underwent yet another metamorphosis when he proceeded to lampoon modern society, albeit with more outlandish imagery and comical undertones. Dante's concept of Hell remained a recurring theme; Fukuzawa utilized the Buddhist monk Genshin's 10th Century text Ojoyoshu (The Essentials of Rebirth in the Pure Land) to lament his view of contemporary Japanese society as a physical manifestation of Hell.

Toilet Paper Hell (1974) features a ruinous urban setting where hundreds of mostly nude, orange-hued individuals run, tumble, and claw each other in a frenetic attempt to seize rolls of toilet paper. The absurd narrative was Fukuzawa's response to the 1973 oil crisis in which Middle Eastern countries severely restricted oil's importation, resulting in a severe economic recession in Japan. Fukuzawa equates this oil scarcity with the toilet paper as a humorous and anarchically critical position of Japanese consumerism.

The 1980s and early-1990s sparked increased anxiety for Fukuzawa as he contemplated the future of human morality in the fast-approaching 21st Century. Pessimism and a fixation on a potential collapse of society pervades his final series of paintings.

Will Evil Voltage Rise in the 21st Century? (1986) is a hauntingly apocalyptic scene where a nude crowd of reddish-skinned people fight one another in hand-to-hand combat. The background presents a dichotomy of different locales: an industrialized urban skyline on the left and a desolate landscape of dead and decaying trees on the right.

Fukuzawa conceived this painting as an indictment of Japan's mid-1980s economic crises, Cold War tensions, and contemporaneous social and political inequalities. Art historians have interpreted this image as a continuation of the agonized nude subjects Fukuzawa produced after Group of Figures Defeated in Battle.

== Death and legacy ==
Fukuzawa died on October 16, 1992, at 94 years old.

Fukuzawa's art influenced and inspired other Japanese artists, including: Kikuji Yamashita, Ebosi Yuasa, Shimizu Toshi, and Suzuki Yashinori.

== Artistic influences ==
Fukuzawa gained stylistic and thematic influence primarily from Western artists and movements that ranged from Classical Antiquity to 20th Century Modernism. The artists who profoundly impacted Fukuzawa's paintings include: Hieronymus Bosch, Peter Paul Rubens, Salvador Dalí, Max Ernst, Giorgio de Chirico, Abraham Rattner, Jackson Pollock, and Rico Lebrun.

== Lost artworks ==
The Fukuzawa Ichiro Memorial Museum initiated and maintains a long-term research project focused on multiple Fukuzawa artworks created between 1945 and 1946 that went missing in the United States in 1947. The disappearance of the paintings in question were purchased by James V. Coleman and featured in the exhibition Fifteen Artists in Postwar Japan at the Tribune Subway Gallery from May 1 - June 5, 1947. These paintings have never appeared privately or publicly since.

== Exhibitions ==
Selected group exhibitions

- 1922: The Fourth Teiten - Imperial Fine Arts Academy Exhibition, Japan
- 1931: 1st Independent Art Association Exhibition, Japan
- 1935: Exhibition of Sketches from Manchuria and Mongolia - Ginza District, Tokyo, Japan
- 1935: Exhibition of Souvenir Sketches of Manchuria and Mongolia - Ginza District, Tokyo, Japan
- 1936: Exhibition in Oil Paintings of Manchuria and Mongolia - Triangle Hall, Osaka, Japan
- 1947: Fifteen Artists in Postwar Japan - Tribune Subway Gallery, New York, USA
- 1952: Japanese Pavilion - XXVI Venice Biennale, Italy
- 1953: Abstraction and Fantasy - The National Museum of Modern Art, Tokyo, Japan
- 1957: 4th Japan-International Art Exhibition - Japan
- 1958: Japanese Pavilion - XXIX Venice Biennale, Italy
- 1960: Development of Japanese Surrealistic Painting - The National Museum of Modern Art, Tokyo, Japan
- 1964: Japanese Artists: A Contrast Seen before and after Sojourning in Europe or America - The National Museum of Modern Art, Tokyo, Japan
- 1968: Dadaism to Surrealism in Japan - The National Museum of Modern Art, Tokyo, Japan
- 1971: Around 1930 in Modern Japanese Art - The National Museum of Modern Art, Tokyo, Japan
- 1975: Surrealism - The National Museum of Modern Art, Tokyo, Japan
- 1985: Reconstructions: Avant-Garde Art in Japan 1945 - 1965 - Museum of Modern Art, Oxford, United Kingdom
- 1985: Tokyo - Montparnasse and Surrealism - Itabashi Art Museum, Tokyo, Japan
- 2003: Dreams of Horizon: Fantastic Paintings in Japan 1935 - 1945 - The National Museum of Modern Art, Tokyo, Japan
- 2004: Post-War Art by Fukuzawa and Other Artists - Tomioka Art Museum, Tomioka, Japan
- 2010: Ichiro Fukuzawa and His Disciples - Itabashi Art Museum, Tokyo, Japan
- 2015: Polyphony of Colors - Arts Maebashi, Gunma, Japan

Retrospectives

- 1976: Ichiro Fukuzawa Retrospective - Museum of Modern Art, Gunma, Japan
- 1988: Ichiro Fukuzawa Retrospective - Museum of Modern Art, Gunma, Japan
- 1988: Fukuzawa, Ichiro - Setagaya Art Museum, Tokyo, Japan
- 1992: Ichiro Fukuzawa Retrospective - Museum of Modern Art, Gunma, Japan
- 1998: Ichiro Fukuzawa Retrospective - Tomioka City Museum/Fukuzawa Ichiro Memorial Gallery, Tomioka, Japan
- 2008: Ichiro Fukuzawa Retrospective - Tama Art University Museum, Tokyo, Japan
- 2009: Ichiro Fukuzawa - Museum of Modern Art, Gunma, Japan
- 2018: Ichiro Fukuzawa Retrospective - Tomioka City Museum/Fukuzawa Ichiro Memorial Gallery
- 2018: Ichiro Fukuzawa Retrospective - Tama Art University Museum, Tokyo, Japan
- 2019: Laugh Off This Hopeless World: Fukuzawa Ichiro - The National Museum of Modern Art, Tokyo, Japan

== Awards and honors ==
A noteworthy aspect of Fukuzawa is that he is one of the few individuals in Japanese history to have been arrested and subsequently received national recognition during his lifetime.

- 1957: Top Prize - The Fourth International Art Exhibition Japan
- 1978: Person of Cultural Merit
- 1991: Order of Culture

== Publications ==
- Surrealism (1937)
- Ernst (1939)
- From Amazon to Mexico (1954)

== Notable works ==
Year	Title
1930	Poisson d'Avril (April Fool)
1931	Agitator
1931	Professors - Thinking About Other Things at Meetings
1936	Oxen
1945	Shipborne Special Unit Leaves the Base
1946	Yukawa (from the illusion of Dante's Divine Comedy)
1948	Group of Figures Defeated in Battle
1955	Man with a Watermelon
1958	Hell Gate
1962	Leda
1965	Woman with a Placard
1965	Freedom or Death
1970	Nymph and Faun
1972	Hunger
1974	Toilet Paper Hell
1980	Lost Paradise
1986	Will Evil Voltage Rise in the 21st Century?
1991	Noah's Art Events
