= Shōzō Kitadai =

Japanese photographer

Shōzō Kitadai (北代 省三, Kitadai Shōzō; 1921–2003) was a Japanese photographer.

In 1956, he became one of the approximately forty members of the newly founded Japan Subjective Photography League, a postwar framework that briefly brought prewar avant-garde figures such as Shūzō Takiguchi, Kansuke Yamamoto, and younger photographers including Kiyoji Ōtsuji, Ikkō Narahara, and Yasuhiro Ishimoto into the same orbit of experimental photography.
