= List of Japanese artists =

This is a list of Japanese artists. This list is intended to encompass Japanese who are primarily fine artists. For information on those who work primarily in film, television, advertising, manga, anime, video games, or performance arts, please see the relevant respective articles.

== Heian and Kamakura periods ==
Name	Life	Comments	Reference
Kose Kanaoka	9th century	Painter of landscapes, court and buddhist paintings, proponent of Yamato-e styles and methods	
Fujiwara Takanobu	1142–1205	Nise-e Painter	
Fujiwara Nobuzane	1176–1265	Nise-e Painter, son of Fujiwara Takanobu	

== Sculptors ==
Name	Life	Comments	Reference
Tori Busshi	late 6th to early 7th centuries	Busshi, patron sculptor to Shōtoku Taishi and Soga no Umako	
Jōchō	d. 1057	Busshi; popularized yosegi technique of carving one figure from many pieces of wood	
Kaikei	mid-to-late 12th century	Busshi founder of the Kei school	
Jōkei	late 12th century	Busshi of the Kei school	
Unkei	1151–1223	Busshi of the Kei school	
Tankei	1173–1256	Busshi of the Kei school	
Kōkei	active 1175–1200	Busshi head of the Kei school during reconstruction of Tōdai-ji and Kōfuku-ji	
Hidari Jingorō	active 1596–1644	Painter, sculptor and carver, his works include many of the carvings at Nikkō Tōshō-gū	
Enkū	1632–1695	Buddhist monk and Busshi sculptor	
Gechu	active 18th century	Sculptor	
Naitō Toyomasa	1773–1856	Sculptor of netsuke	
Tetsuya Noguchi	Born 1980	Sculptor	
Chie Aoki	Born 1981	Sculptor	

== Pottery and ceramics ==
Name	Life	Comments	Reference
Hamada Shōji	1894–1978	Potter, declared a Living National Treasure in 1955	
Kimiyo Mishima	1932–2024	Ceramic artist	
Seiko Kato Behr	1941–2010	Japanese-born American potter, ceramicist, ikebana flower artist, installation artist, and sculptor	
Jun Kaneko	Born 1942	Potter and ceramics artist	
Masaya Imanishi	Born 1947	Ceramic artist	
Yukio Ozaki	Born 1948	Japanese-born ceramic artist, wood sculptor, teacher in Hawaii	
Yo Akiyama	Born 1953	Ceramic artist of the Sōdeisha movement	

== Sumi-e (ink painting) ==
Name	Life	Comments	Reference
Josetsu	1405–1423	Suiboku painter, likely a teacher of Tenshō Shūbun	
Tenshō Shūbun	1414–1463	Sumi-e painter	
Sesshū Tōyō	1420–1506	Associated with Sumi-e	
Shingei	1431–1485	Also known as Geiami, yamato-e ink painter	
Soami	d. 1525	Painter and landscape artist; one of the first nanga painters	
Yosa Buson	1716–1784	Painter who perfected the nanga style, also a renowned poet	
Ike no Taiga	1723–1776	Painter who perfected the nanga style	
Koho Yamamoto	1922–	Student of Chiura Obata	

== Kanō School ==
Name	Life	Comments	Reference
Kanō Masanobu	1434–1530	Founder of the Kanō School, chief painter to Ashikaga shogunate during his time	
Kanō Motonobu	1476–1559	Painter of the Kanō School, son of Kanō Masanobu	
Kanō Eitoku	1543–1590	Painter, re-founder of the Kanō school	
Kanō Mitsunobu	d. 1608	Son of Eitoku, inherited Kanō school after his father's death	
Kanō Tan'yū	1602–1674	Prominent Kanō school painter, official painter to the Tokugawa shogunate	
Kanō Hōgai	1828–1888	Among the last of the Kanō school painters, incorporated Western stylistic elements	
Hashimoto Gahō	1835–1908	Among the last of the Kanō school painters, chief professor of painting at two schools	

== Rimpa School ==
Name	Life	Comments	Reference
Hon'ami Kōetsu	1558–1637	Painter, co-founder of the Rimpa school	
Tawaraya Sōtatsu	d. 1643	Painter, co-founder of the Rimpa school	
Ogata Kōrin	1657–1716	Painter and lacquerer, major figure in the Rimpa school	
Ogata Kenzan	1663–1743	Painter and potter, major figure in the Rimpa school	
Sakai Hōitsu	1761–1828	Painter, associated with the Rimpa school	
Kamisaka Sekka	1866–1942	The most recent painting master of the Rimpa school and craftsman	

== Tosa School ==
Name	Life	Comments	Reference
Iwasa Matabei	1578–1650	Tosa school painter of genre and historical scenes, predecessor to ukiyo-e	

== Kyoto School ==
Name	Life	Comments	Reference
Tomioka Tessai	1836–1924	Painter and calligrapher of the Kyoto School	
Maruyama Ōkyo	1733–1795	Sumi-e painter, founder of Shijō school	
Kikuchi Yōsai	1781–1878	Painter of the Kyoto, Shijō, and Maruyama schools	

== Nihonga Painters ==
Name	Life	Comments	Reference
Yokoyama Taikan	1868–1958	Painter	
Okuda Gensou	1912–2003	Nihonga painter of the Shōwa era, gave his name to 'Gensou red' pigment	
Goto Jin	Born 1968	Nihonga painter of the Heisei era.Human Beauty paintings.	
Fuyuko Matsui	Born 1974	Contemporary Nihonga painter living in Tokyo.	

== Eccentrics and smaller schools ==
Name	Life	Comments	Reference
Ogura Yonesuke Itoh	1870–1940	Japanese born painter of Hawaii's Volcano School	
Otagaki Rengetsu	1791–1851	Calligrapher and poet	
Hasegawa Settan	d. 1843	Painter of the Hasegawa school, ukiyo-e printmaker, and sculptor	
Hasegawa Tohaku	1539–1610	Ink painter, founder of the Hasegawa school	
Shibata Zeshin	1807–1891	Painter trained in the Kyoto School, master craftsman and innovator, particularly in lacquer	
Eijiro Miyama	Born 1934	Outsider artist known as the "Hat Man"	

== Ukiyo-e painters and printmakers ==
Name	Life	Comments	Reference
Hishikawa Moronobu	1618–1694	"Father of ukiyo-e	
Torii Kiyonobu I	1664–1729	Printmaker	
Sukenobu	1682–1752	Ukiyo-e painter, Miyagawa school	
Miyagawa Shunsui	fl. c. 1740–60s	Ukiyo-e painter, son and student of Miyagawa Chōshun	
Miyagawa Isshō	mid-18th century	Painter, student of Miyagawa Chōshun	
Okumura Masanobu	1686–1764	Printmaker, Torii school initially	
Toriyama Sekien	1712–1788	Printmaker, teacher of Utamaro	
Suzuki Harunobu	1724–1770	Printmaker	
Katsukawa Shunshō	1726–1792	Printmaker, leading figure in the Katsukawa school	
Sharaku	d. 1801	One of the greatest and most mysterious ukiyo-e printmakers; career spanned only ten months	
Kitao Shigemasa	1739–1820	Printmaker-Founder of Kitao school of ukiyo-e	
Torii Kiyonaga	1752–1815	Printmaker, Fourth titular head of the Torii school	
Utamaro	1753–1806	Printmaker, painter	
Koryusai	1735–1790	Printmaker	
Hokusai	1760–1849	Ukiyo-e painter, woodblock print artist, Thirty-six Views of Mount Fuji	
Toyokuni	1769–1825	Printmaker, associated with the Utagawa school	
Utagawa Kunimasa	1773–1810	Printmaker	
Toyohiro	1773–1828	Printmaker and painter of the Utagawa school, teacher of Hiroshige	
Kawahara Keiga	1786–1860?	Painter on paper, silk and wood at Dejima, Nagasaki and on travels through Japan. Biological depictions of flowers and animals for Philipp Franz von Siebold, scenes with persons in- and outdoors, and at the court of Edo	
Hiroshige	1797–1858	Ukiyo-e painter and woodblock print artist, Sixty-nine Stations on the Kiso Kaidō, Fifty-three Stations of the Tōkaidō and 100 Famous Views of Edo	
Konishi Hirosada	1810–1864	Printmaker of the Osaka school	
Utagawa Kunisada II	1823–1880	Printmaker of the Utagawa school	
Hokuei	d. 1837	Printmaker	
Kunimasu	Unknown	Printmaker	
Kawanabe Kyosai	1831–1889	Student of Kuniyoshi, first Japanese political cartoonist	
Toyohara Kunichika	1835–1900	Printmaker known for actor prints	
Yoshitoshi	1839–1892	Printmaker, one of the last great masters of ukiyo-e	

== Modern artists ==
Name	Life	Comments	Reference
Koun Takamura	1851–1934	Father of Kotaro Takamura, sculptor of Ueno Park statue of Saigō Takamori	
Tama Kiyohara	1861–1939	Western-style painter, wife of sculptor Vincenzo Ragusa, who lived 52 years in Sicily. Also known as Eleonora Ragusa	
Arai Yoshimune	1863-1941	Woodblock print artist of the shin hanga movement	
Kuroda Seiki	1866–1924	Painter who introduced impressionism to Japan	
Kume Keiichiro	1866–1934	Impressionist painter trained in France	
Okada Saburōsuke	1869–1939	Painter, mostly in the Yōga style, and art professor	
Toyozo Arakawa	1874–1985	Well-known ceramic painter	
Ito Yuhan	1882-1951	Woodblock print artist of the shin hanga movement	
Kotaro Takamura	1883–1956	Sculptor and poet, combining Western styles with Japanese tradition	
Rosanjin	1883–1959	Calligrapher, ceramicist and restaurateur	
Tsuguharu Foujita	1886–1968	Painter and engraver, applied French oil painting techniques to traditional Japanese painting	
Ohno Bakufu	1888–1976	Painter and printmaker	
Kawai Kanjirō	1890–1966	Potter and a key figure in mingei (Japanese folk art) and studio pottery movements	
Yasuo Kuniyoshi	1893–1953	Migrated to New York from Japan in 1906. Well known for his paintings related to Social Realism	
Kanpū Ōmata	1894–1947	Painter and waka poet	
Haruko Hasegawa	1895–1967	Painter, illustrator, writer; she specialized in war painting	
Kaita Murayama	1896–1919	Painter, known primarily for his work as an author	
Bumpei Usui	1898–1994	Painter, born in Japan, emigrated to New York in 1921	
Ichiro Fukuzawa	1896–1992	Surrealist painter	
Iwao Yamawaki	1898–1987	Bauhaus educated photographer and architect	
Kenzo Okada	1902–1982	Abstract expressionist painter in New York City and Japan	
Shiko Munakata	1903–1975	Woodcut artist, painter, and calligrapher	
Koiso Ryouhei	1903–1988	Painter of World War II military scenes	
Isamu Noguchi	1904–1988	Sculptor	
Jiro Yoshihara	1905–1972	Founding member of Gutai group	
Migishi Setsuko	1905–1999	Painter and illustrator known as one of the pioneering Japanese women in oil painting	
Suda Kokuta	1906–1990	Abstract and Western-style painter, calligrapher	
Hideo Date	1907–2004	Immigrated to California from Osaka, Japan. When in Los Angeles, he was influenced by artist and teacher Stanton MacDonald-Wright at the Art Students' League in Los Angeles.	
Taro Yashima	1908–1994	Children's book Illustrator and Author	
Yozo Hamaguchi	1909–2000	Mezzotint printmaker	
Minami Keiko	1911–2004	Aquatint engraver and printmaker	
Yoshio Fujimaki	1911–disappeared 1935	Sōsaku-hanga woodblock printmaker	
Kansuke Yamamoto	1914–1987	Avant-garde photographer and poet associated with Surrealism	
Itchiku Kubota	1917–2003	Textile artist	
Tomiyama Taeko	1921–2021	Visual artist, painter	
Yoshida Kenji	1924-2009	Abstract painter	
Tsuruko Yamazaki	1925–2019	Avant-garde artist; member of the Gutai group	
Michio Ihara	Born 1928	Sculptor	
Tsunehisa Kimura	1928–2008	Photomontage artist	
Shozo Shimamoto	1928–2013	Gutai group artist	
Tezuka Osamu	1928–1989	Famous manga artist with works like Astro Boy and Kimba the White Lion	
Yayoi Kusama	1929–2026	Conceptual artist, self-described "obsessive artist"	
Minoru Niizuma	1930–1998	Abstract sculptor	
Shigeo Fukuda	1932–2009	Sculptor, graphic artist and poster designer who created optical illusions	
Ushio Shinohara	Born 1932	Japanese Neo-Dadaist artist	
On Kawara	1933–2014	Conceptual Artist	
Yoko Ono	Born 1933	Conceptual and performance artist, singer, and widow of John Lennon	
Fujiko Nakaya	Born 1933	Fog sculptor	
Morino Hiroaki	Born 1934	Potter	
Shusaku Arakawa	1936–2010	Abstract painter and architect from Tokyo, living in New York since 1961	
Keiichi Tanaami	Born 1936	Multi-genre artist from Tokyo working as a graphic designer, illustrator, video artist and fine artist.	
Hiroshi Tomihari	Born 1936	Woodcut printmaker	
Susumu Shingu	Born 1937	Kinetic sculptor. His nature-inspired works are constructed of highly engineered materials, commonly steel and Teflon	
Shotaro Ishinomori	1938–1998	Manga artist and mechanical designer of Cyborg 009 and Super Sentai (Goranger to J.A.K.Q.)	
Junko Chodos	Born 1939	Mixed media artist residing in the United States	
Kanda Nissho	1937–1970	Farmer and painter of agricultural scenes	
Michiko Suganuma	Born 1940	Urushi lacquer artist, coating original technique to traditional Japanese-urushi	
Tetsuya Noda	Born 1940	Print artist	
Tadao Okazaki	Born 1943	Painter	
Go Nagai	Born 1945	Manga artist and mechanical designer of Mazinger Z, Getter Robo and Devilman	
Shigeru Nakanishi	Born 1946	Oil painter	
Kiyoto Ota	Born 1948	Japanese-Mexican sculptor	
Ryosuke Cohen	Born 1948	Mail artist	
Naohisa Inoue	Born 1948	Surrealist painter of fantasy lands	
Jin Homura	Born 1948	Oil painter, primarily in primary colors	
Susumu Matsushita	Born 1950	Manga artist, air painter, character designer and concept artist	
Minoru Ohira	born 1950	Japanese-born artist in California	
Toeko Tatsuno	1950–2014	Abstract painter, printmaker, and professor at Tama Art University	
Yasumasa Morimura	Born 1951	Appropriation artist	
Katsura Funakoshi	Born 1951	Sculptor and printmaker	
Yoshitaka Amano	Born 1952	Character designer, illustrator, printmaker, painter and sculptor	
Shigeru Miyamoto	Born 1952	Video game artist, character designer, director and producer of Nintendo	
Naoyuki Kato	Born 1953	Illustrator, focusing on mechanical designs and anime/manga concept art	
Noriko Shinohara	Born 1953	Multi-disciplinary fine artist with drawing and printmaking series, "Cutie & Bullie".	
Kenjiro Okazaki	Born 1955	Painter, sculptor, architect theorist	
Tatsuo Miyajima	Born 1957	Conceptual artist based in Ibaraki, Japan	
Hiroshi Senju	Born 1958, Tokyo	Painter, modernism expressed through ancient method of Japanese painting	
Yoshiteru Otani	Born 1958	Cartoonist	
Yoshitomo Nara	Born 1959	Pop artist	
Yoshiko Shimada	Born 1959	Printmaker and video artist	
Takeshi Motomiya	Born 1959	Abstract painter from Tokyo, living in Barcelona since 1986. Grandson of Japanese artists Migishi Setsuko and Migishi Kōtarō.	
Osamu Sato	Born 1960	Digital artist, photographer, and composer	
Hiroshi Ōnishi	1961–2011	Painter, professor at Tokyo University of the Arts	
Naoko Tosa	Born 1961	Media artist	
Takashi Murakami	Born 1962	Sculptor and painter, founder of the Superflat movement	
Shiro Takatani	Born 1963	Visual artist	
Minako Nishiyama	Born 1965	Contemporary painter and sculptor	
Tomoko Takahashi	Born 1966	Installation artist based in London	
Ryoji Ikeda	Born 1966	Visual artist	
Mariko Mori	Born 1967, Tokyo, Japan	Highly celebrated contemporary video and photographic artist	
Yoko Nagayama	Born 1968	Enka singer, J-pop idol, actress	
Junichi Kakizaki	Born 1971, Nagano	Sculptor, floral artist, land and environmental artist focusing on floral design	
Rokudenashiko	Born 1972	Sculptor and manga artist	
Ryota Matsumoto	Birthdate unknown	Visual artist	
Miya Ando	Born 1973	Award-winning Post-minimalist painter and sculptor working in aluminum, steel and glass	
Mori Chack	Born 1973	Graphics designer	
Chiharu Shiota	Born 1972	Visual artist	
Chinatsu Ban	Born 1973	Painter and sculptor	
Yurie Nagashima	Born 1973	Photographer, writer and curator	
Tanabe Chikuunsai IV	Born 1973	Bamboo master and sculptor	
Tetsuya Ishida	1973–2005	Contemporary Surrealist painter	
Fuyuki Yamakawa	Born 1973	Sound and performance artist	
Yutaka Inagawa	Born 1974	Painter, line artist, photographer producing digital collage	
Chiho Aoshima	Born 1974	Pop artist in the Superflat movement	
Aya Takano	Born 1976	Pop artist in the Superflat movement	
Tetsuya Noguchi	Born 1980	Contemporary artist and sculptor	
Tets Ohnari	Born 1980	Contemporary artist and sculptor living in Prague and Tokyo	
Aki Sasamoto	Born 1980	Performance artist based in New York City	
Nahoko Kojima	Born 1981	Contemporary paper cut artist, pioneered Kirie as sculpture	
Kohei Fujito	Born 1983	Contemporary Ainu folk artist	
Mitsunori Kimura	Born 1983	Japanese contemporary artist	
Tsubasa Kato	Born 1984	Japanese contemporary artist	
Mari Katayama	Born 1987	Japanese multimedia artist and photographer	
You Shiina	Birthdate unknown	Japanese illustrator and manga artist	
Yoichi Ochiai	Born 1987	Japanese multimedia artist, academic, and photographer	
Yuki Iiyama	Born 1988	Japanese contemporary artist	

== See also ==
- List of manga artists
- List of Utagawa school members
- List of Japanese photographers
- List of Yōga painters
