= Minako =

- Pronunciation: Mi-na-ko
- Gender: Female

Origin
- Origin: Japanese
- Meaning: many different meanings depending on the kanji used
- Region of origin: Japan

Other names
- Related names: Mina

Minako (みなこ, ミナコ) is a Japanese feminine given name. Minako can be written using different kanji characters:

- 美奈子, "beauty, apple tree, child"
- 美那子, "beauty, unknown, child" or "beauty, child"
- 美菜子, "beauty, (green) vegetable, child"
- 美名子, "beauty, name, child"
- 美梨子, "beauty, pear, child"
- 聖名子, "holy, name, child"
- 聖奈子, "holy, apple tree, child or holy child"
- 皆子, "everybody/all, child"
- 水奈子 "water, apple tree, child" or "water, child"
- 実奈子 "truth, apple tree, child"
- 実菜子 "truth, (green) vegetable, child"
- 実那子 "truth, unknown, child" or "truth, child"
- 実名子 "truth, name, child"

The name can also be written in hiragana or katakana.

== People ==
- Minako (geisha), a Japanese famous geisha.
- Minako (美奈子), a member of the Japanese musical group Kome Kome Club
- Minako Honda (本田 美奈子; 1967–2005), Japanese singer
- Minako Inoue (井上 美奈子; born 1977), Japanese singer
- Minako Iwasaki (岩崎 美奈子; born 1975), a Japanese illustrator, game character designer, and manga artist
- Minako Komukai (小向 美奈子; born 1985), Japanese gravure model
- Minako Kotobuki (寿 美菜子; born 1991), a Japanese voice actress and singer
- Minako Nishiyama (西山 美なコ; born 1965), a Japanese contemporary artist
- Minako Oba (大庭 みな子; 1930–2007), Japanese author and social critic
- Minako Sato (佐藤 美奈子; born 1955), Japanese archer

== Fictional characters ==
- Minako Aino (also known as Sailor Venus), a character in the Sailor Moon series and the main protagonist of Codename: Sailor V
- Minako Arisato, one of the given names to the female protagonist in Persona 3 Portable
- Minako Yurihara, a character in the light novel series Boogiepop
