= Kanpū Ōmata =

Japanese painter and poet (1894–1947)

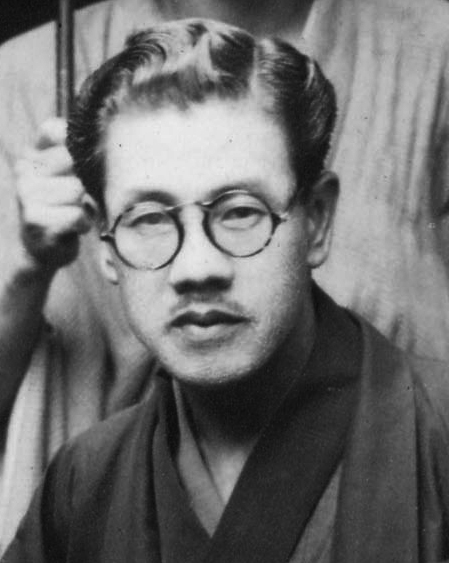
Kanpū Ōmata

Kanpū Ōmata (大亦 観風, Ōmata Kanpū; 9 September 1894 – 22 October 1947) was the pseudonym of Japanese Shōwa period painter and Waka poet, Omata Shinjirō.

== Career ==
Kanpū (1894 – 22 October 1947) was born in Wakayama, Wakayama Prefecture, where he later grew up and studied western style oil painting. In 1913, he went to Tokyo to studied at the Taiheiyōgakai Kenkyūjo and the Japan Fine Arts Academy (Nihon Bijutsu-in). After the death of his father in 1918, Kanpū moved to Meguro City (Tokyo) to live with his younger sister.

In the early Shōwa period, he converted to Japanese-style painting, and studied under Terasaki Kogyo. After Terasaki died he studied Nanga (南画) under Komuro Suiun (小室翠雲). He joined the waka poetry coterie "Aogaki" in 1927, and drew cover illustrations for their coterie magazine for years. His first exhibition Kishū-ji Angya Nikki Emaki (紀州路行脚日記絵巻) (The picture scroll recording a journey in Wakayama) was held at Shirakiya department store, Tokyo in 1934. The picture scroll is possessed by Museum of Modern Art, Wakayama. His second exhibition, Nanki Wakayama gaito Kijin-den gakan (南紀若山街頭奇人伝画巻), was held in 1936 and his third exhibition, Hyoryu ibun ekotoba (漂流異聞絵詞), was held in 1938. Shown in 1940, his fourth exhibition, entitled Manyo-shu ga sen (万葉集画撰), featured depictions of the Waka poetry from Man'yōshū, the oldest existing collection of Japanese poetry, and is considered his most important set of work.
