= Eijirō (given name) =

- Gender: Male

Origin
- Origin: Japanese
- Meaning: Different meanings depending on the kanji used

Eijirō, Eijiro or Eijirou (written: 英治郎, 英次郎 or 英二郎) is a masculine Japanese given name. Notable people with the name include:

- Eijiro Miyama (宮間 英次郎, 1934-2024), Japanese artist
- Eijiro Mori (森 英次郎; born 1986), Japanese footballer
- Eijiro Ozaki (尾崎 英二郎), Japanese actor
- Eijiro Takeda (武田 英二郎; born 1988), Japanese footballer
- Eijirō Tōno (東野 英治郎; 1907–1994), Japanese actor

== Fictional characters ==
- Eijiro Kirishima (切島 鋭児郎) a character in the manga series My Hero Academia
