= Okuda =

Okuda (written: 奥田) is a Japanese surname. Notable people with the surname include:

- Amy Okuda, actress
- Atsuya Okuda, Japanese-born teacher and craftsman of the hocchiku, an unrefined bamboo flute
- Denise Okuda, author, co-author of the Star Trek Encyclopedia
- Eiji Okuda (b. 1950), Japanese actor and film director
- Gensou Okuda (1912 - 2003), Japanese Nihonga painter
- Hiroki Okuda (奥田 裕貴; born 1992), Japanese footballer
- Hiroshi Okuda (b. 1932), chairman of the Toyota Motor Corporation
- Hitoshi Okuda, is a Japanese manga artist
- Keijin Okuda, (b. 1972), Japanese voice actor
- Michael Okuda, graphic designer best known for his work on Star Trek
- Seiki Okuda (奥田 靖己; born 1960), Japanese golfer
- Shoji Okuda, petty officer who served as an aerial observer in the Imperial Japanese Navy
- Shuri Okuda (b. 1989), Japanese professional wrestler
- Shunsaku Okuda, Japanese musician and member of the J-Rock band The Brilliant Green
- Taketo Okuda, Japanese Karate master, JKA chief instructor in Brazil, quit to focus on his own organization, Butoku-kan
- Tamio Okuda (b. 1965), Japanese singer, songwriter, and producer
- Ted Okuda (b. 1953), American non-fiction author in film, television, and entertainment subjects
- Tomoko Okuda, Japanese boxer

== Fictional characters ==
- Manami Okuda (奥田 愛美), a character in the Assassination Classroom anime and manga

== See also ==
- 6838 Okuda, a main-belt asteroid
- Okuda San Miguel (b. 1980), Spanish artist known for his colorful geometric murals
- Okuda Station, a railway station in Inazawa, Aichi, Japan
- Jeff Okudah (born 1999), American football cornerback
