= Chuzo =

Chuzo may refer to the following people:

- Ryuson Chuzo Matsuyama (1880–1954), Japanese landscape artist
- Chuzo Tamotzu (1888–1975), Japanese painter
- Antonio González Álvarez aka Chuzo (1940–2025), Spanish footballer
