= Bumpei Usui =

Japanese American artist (1898–1994)

- 碓氷文平 (Usui Bunpei)
- Bumpei Usui
- Born: February 25, 1898; Nagano, Japan
- Died: March 1994 (aged 96); New York, New York
- Resting place: Nicholson Cemetery, Nicholson, Pennsylvania
- Spouse: Frances Elizabeth Pratt

Bumpei Usui (碓氷文平, Usui Bunpei; 1898—1994) was a Japanese-born American painter known for his social realist cityscapes and scenes of urban life as well as his interiors, flower studies, and still lifes. A critic once described his style as "cultivated realism" in 1935. Other critics praised his handling of color, feeling for textures, and instinct for space values. Some saw Precisionism in his cityscapes. His paintings of people interacting with each other showed both the humorous and harsher sides of city life. Following his death his work received little attention until, in 2014, the Metropolitan Museum of Art bought one of his paintings and subsequently gave it a prominent place in a major exhibition. Along with his career as painter, Usui was a custom frame maker, furniture designer, and lacquering craftsman. He was also a collector of antique Japanese swords and breeder of Siamese cats.

== Early life and training ==
Born in 1898 Usui was raised in Nagano Prefecture, Japan, where his father owned a silkworm farm. When he was nineteen he took ship for London where his brother was a dealer and collector of Western art. There, he learned English and, as time permitted, he made his first paintings. To survive, he obtained a job decorating furniture. As part of this work he learned a style of East Asian decorating that was popular in early 18th-century England. Called Queen Anne lacquering, the technique used gold particles in wet lacquer to decorate chests, cabinets, mirrors, and other furniture. Usui traveled from London to New York in 1921 and again was able to earn his living by applying lacquer decoration in a furniture factory.

== Career in art ==
While earning his living decorating pianos and furniture, Usui began to associate with Japanese artists in the city and to make paintings of his own. The informal group to which he attached himself included Yasuo Kuniyoshi, Kyohei Inukai, Eitaro Ishigaki, Gozo Kawamura, Toshi Shimizu, Kiyoshi Shimizu, Chuzo Tamotzu, and Torajiro Watanabe. In 1921 this group formed an organization devoted to mutual support and the exhibition of their work. In November 1922 it held its first show. Called "Exhibition of the Japan Artists Association in New York City", it was held in the gallery of the Civic Club on 12th Street near Fifth Avenue. The Japanese artists' show was one of the club's first exhibitions. A review in the New York Times noted the youth of the artists and their decision to adopt Western styles in their work. A critic called Usui "self-taught and sensitive", and praised his handling of color. Usui continued to work as a lacquerer in a furniture factory until 1927. He had by then also established an art studio called Dai Butsu or "Great Buddha" at his apartment on West 14th Street. In 1925 he began showing with the Society of Independent Artists, which had no selection juries and offered no prizes. That year he also began showing with Salons of America, another organization that sponsored juryless exhibitions. Like his friend Kuniyoshi he spent part of the summer in the Woodstock artists colony and joined the Woodstock Artists Association. When he showed in a Salons of America exhibition early in 1925, a review in the New Yorker magazine called attention to a painting called "Machine Shop" that, the reviewer said, "is new in a way that does not remind you of every other modern you have seen this year." The exhibition catalog for a Society of Independent Artists later that year included a reproduction of his painting named "Roof at Evening". A review by Forbes Watson in The Arts magazine called the a show of the Independent in 1926, "refreshing and enjoyable" and credited Usui with giving "a humorous outlook on the American scene." A review in Arts and Decoration said that Usui's "Summer Evening" was "truly amusing". Commenting on a painting that would become one of his best known, the reviewer said Usui's "Party on the Roof" was less derivative than other works and noted a detail in which two persons, whom the reviewer called "peeping spinsters", look on, horrified at the bohemian excesses they observe. At an Independents exhibition held in 1929, Usui showed a painting of four women picnicking called "Sunday Afternoon". Writing in the Baltimore Sun, Jerome Klein called it a "clever rendering". During the second half of the 1920s Usui continued to show at the Salons and Independents (as they were called) and in 1927 participated in another group exhibition with Japanese artists. Reporting on a show by the Independents in 1930, a critic credited Usui with a high level of sophistication, skill, and ability. The critic said a painting called "Siesta" was "an exceedingly smart performance." In addition to shows hosted by the Salons and Independents, Usui participated with several new groups during the early 1930s. With six other artists, he helped found an artists' cooperative called "An American Group" in 1931. The seven held their first show at a hotel in February of the next year. Although he had not been a student at the Art Students League, he showed in a print exhibition with a group of the League's former students later that year. During the summer of 1932 he showed for the first time in an exhibition sponsored by Robert U. Godsoe called the Gotham Outdoor Gallery. A reviewer noted that Usui's contributions were a good deal more professional than the ones shown by other artists. The following year he showed at the Albright-Knox Art Gallery in Buffalo. In April 1934 he was given a solo exhibition at the Roerich Museum beside four other artists, all of whom had participated in outdoor exhibitions held in Washington Square. Later that year he participated in a group show at the Contemporary Arts Gallery and in another group show at Wanamaker's department store. The New York Times reproduced a painting from this show and its critic, Edward Alden Jewell, said the painting, called variously "Interior" or simply "Painting" was "enchanting" and "might well have been honored by the purchasing committee, and that certainly should enter some collection without delay." When a collector did thereafter buy the work, the transaction was Usui's first sale. After the show closed, a critic noted that the painting had received much attention.

During the early 1930s, Usui's paintings appeared in traveling exhibitions sponsored by the College Art Association. Of one such exhibition at Williams College in 1935, a local critic identified him as "the Greenwich Village picture framer and Siamese cat breeder, who has found time to teach himself art with such amazing results that art patrons and critics in New York are at present convincing themselves that in this Japanese artist, they have made an important find." That year Usui participated in a group exhibition at A. C. A. Galleries. At the time reviewers gave favorable attention to his work. One noted that he had established himself as a well-known artist. As if to confirm his prominence in the art world, the New Yorker magazine included an article about him in its issue for January 5, 1935. Later that year he joined the Federal Art Project as a means of surviving the loss of income brought on by the Great Depression. Over the next seven years group shows held by the project included his work, often receiving critical notice. A painting called "Coal Barges" was reproduced in the catalog of an FAP exhibition in the Museum of Modern Art and three years later the Pennsylvania Academy of Fine Arts awarded it a prize at its 131st annual exhibition. Writing about a Federal Arts Project show in 1938, a critic called a attention to paintings of flowers of his that were exceptional for their "vibrant colors and for the vitality with which old topics are newly endowed". In reviewing this show, another critic said Usui extracted a high level of decorative quality in one of his paintings, adding, "In linear harmony, delicacy of color, and rich quality, it is outstanding." Writing on December 4, 1941, just before the Japanese bombing of Pearl Harbor, another critic praised a flower painting in an FAP exhibition as "very beautiful". After the outbreak of World War II, Usui stopped participating in exhibitions. Before the war, immigration laws prevented him from obtaining US citizenship or marrying a US citizen. After it had begun, his status was changed from "resident alien" to "enemy alien". He was then subject to government surveillance, was prevented from traveling without a permit, and was forbidden to possess any items that might be used to compromise defense. Reviewing a show that had been planned before the declaration of war and opened soon after, a critic drew attention away from his Japanese birth by saying he was "of oriental origin".

In 1947 Usui's work appeared again in New York, this time in a solo exhibition at the Laurel Gallery. The show drew a favorable review from Howard Devree of the New York Times who said his paintings, most of them not previously exhibited, were among his best. A review in Art Digest said they showed sensitive brushwork and a "nice feeling for color". Usui continued to earn his living as a framer and cat breeder but did not show his paintings again until 1978 when he participated in a group show with other Japanese artists at the Azuma gallery. Art in America magazine reproduced an informal portrait by Usui of his friend Kuniyoshi in its issue for January–February of that year. A year later the Salander Galleries gave Usui a retrospective exhibition containing works from 1925 to 1949. He was given a second solo retrospective in 1983, this time in Tokyo in an exhibition at the Fuji Television Gallery.

A few decades after his death, a critic for the New York Times said Usui had "fallen out of sight" after enjoying recognition in the 1920s and 1930s that was comparable to the recognition given to such artists as Marsden Hartley and Charles Demuth. In 2014 the Metropolitan Museum of Art gave a detailed description of Usui's 1925 painting called "The Furniture Factory" in an announcement of its recent acquisitions. The museum had obtained the work by trading other pieces in its collection to the commercial gallery that possessed it. Once having bought it, put the painting on view in its Contemporary Art Galleries and, the following year, included it in a special exhibition of 250 works called "Reimagining Modernism: 1900-1950". Reviewing this show, Roberta Smith called "The Furniture Factory" a work of "energetic complexity". Another Times critic noted that it was the only museum holding of a painting by Usui in New York. In 2021 the Smithsonian American Art Museum included a painting called "Portrait of Yasuo Kuniyoshi" (1930) in its "Artist to Artist" exhibition.

== Artistic style ==
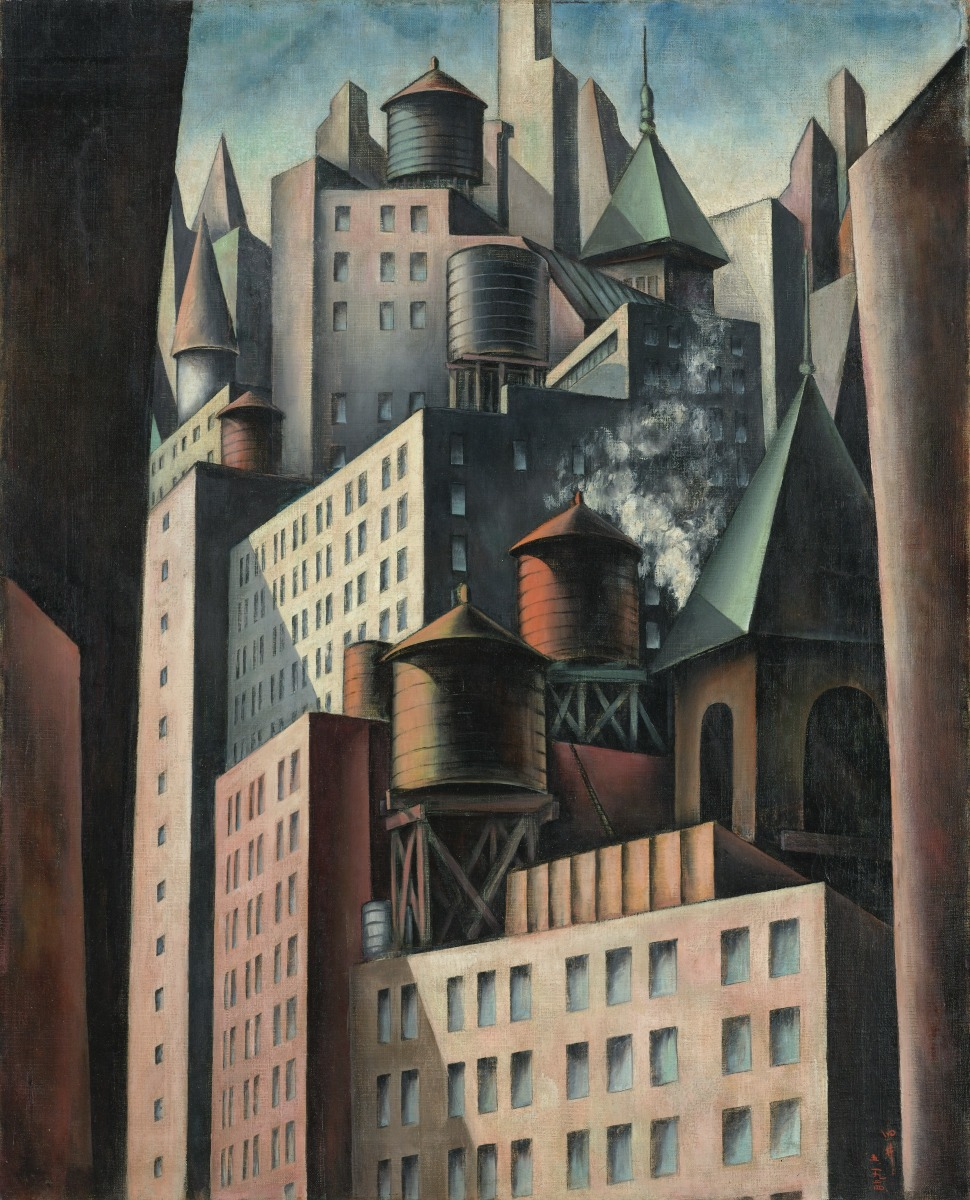
(1) Bumpei Usui, 14th Street, 1924, oil on canvas, 30 1/8 × 24 inches

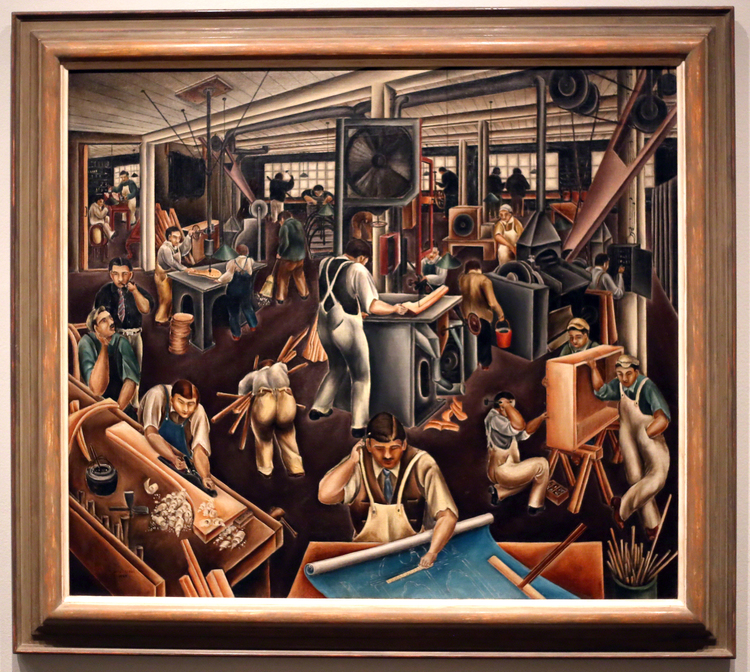
(2) Bumpei Usui, Furniture Factory, 1925, oil on canvas, 36 x 43 inches

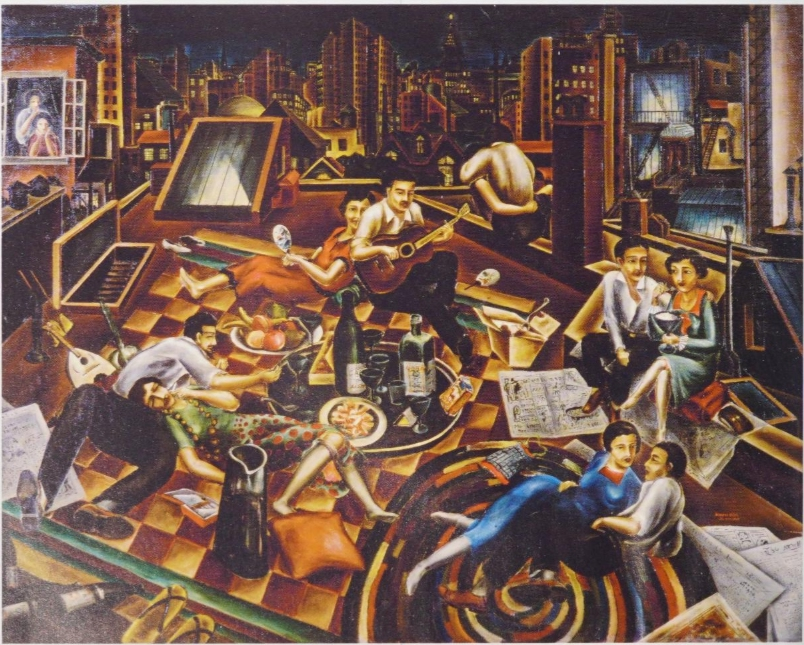
(3) Bumpei Usui, Party on the Roof, 1926, oil on canvas, 46 1/4 x 58 inches

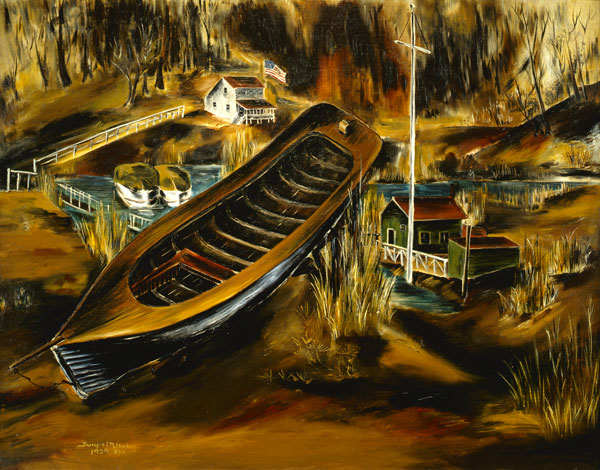
(4) Bumpei Usui, harbor scene, about 1929, oil on canvas

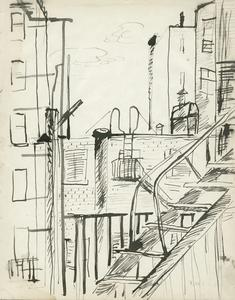
(5) Bumpei Usui, Rooftops and Fire Escape, 1930, ink on paper, 10 x 8 inches

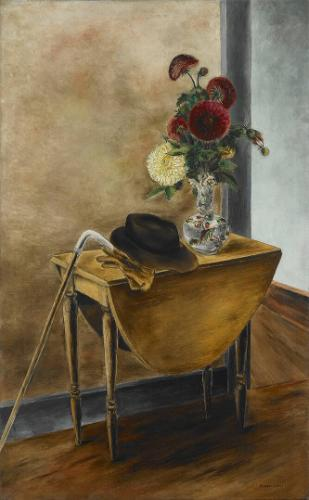
(6) Bumpei Usui, Still Life: Kuniyoshi's Studio, 1930, oil on canvas, 50 x 32 inches

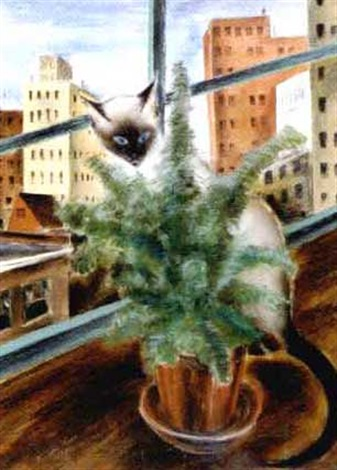
(7) Bumpei Usui, Cat in the Window, 1932, oil on canvas, 61 x 45 1/2 inches

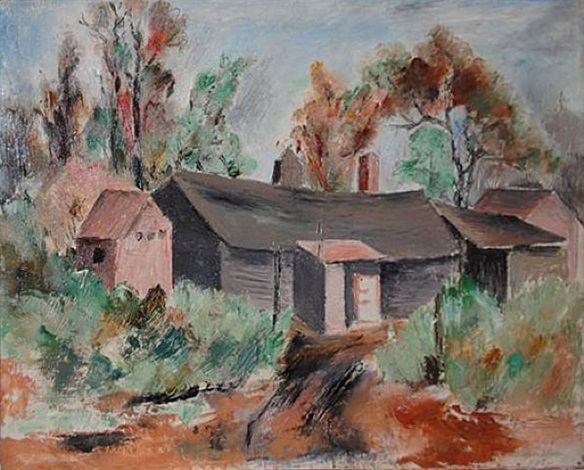
(8) Bumpei Usui, Bronx, 1933, oil on canvas, 14 1/2 x 20 inches

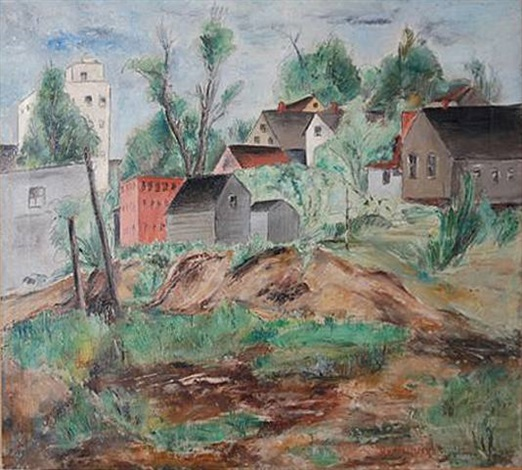
(9) Bumpei Usui, Backyard Staten Island, 1933, oil on canvas, 14 1/2 x 20 inches

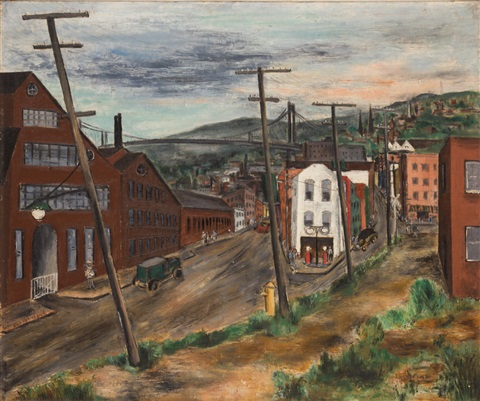
(10) Bumpei Usui, Round Out Old Section, Kingston, New York, 1949, oil on canvas, 20 x 24 inches

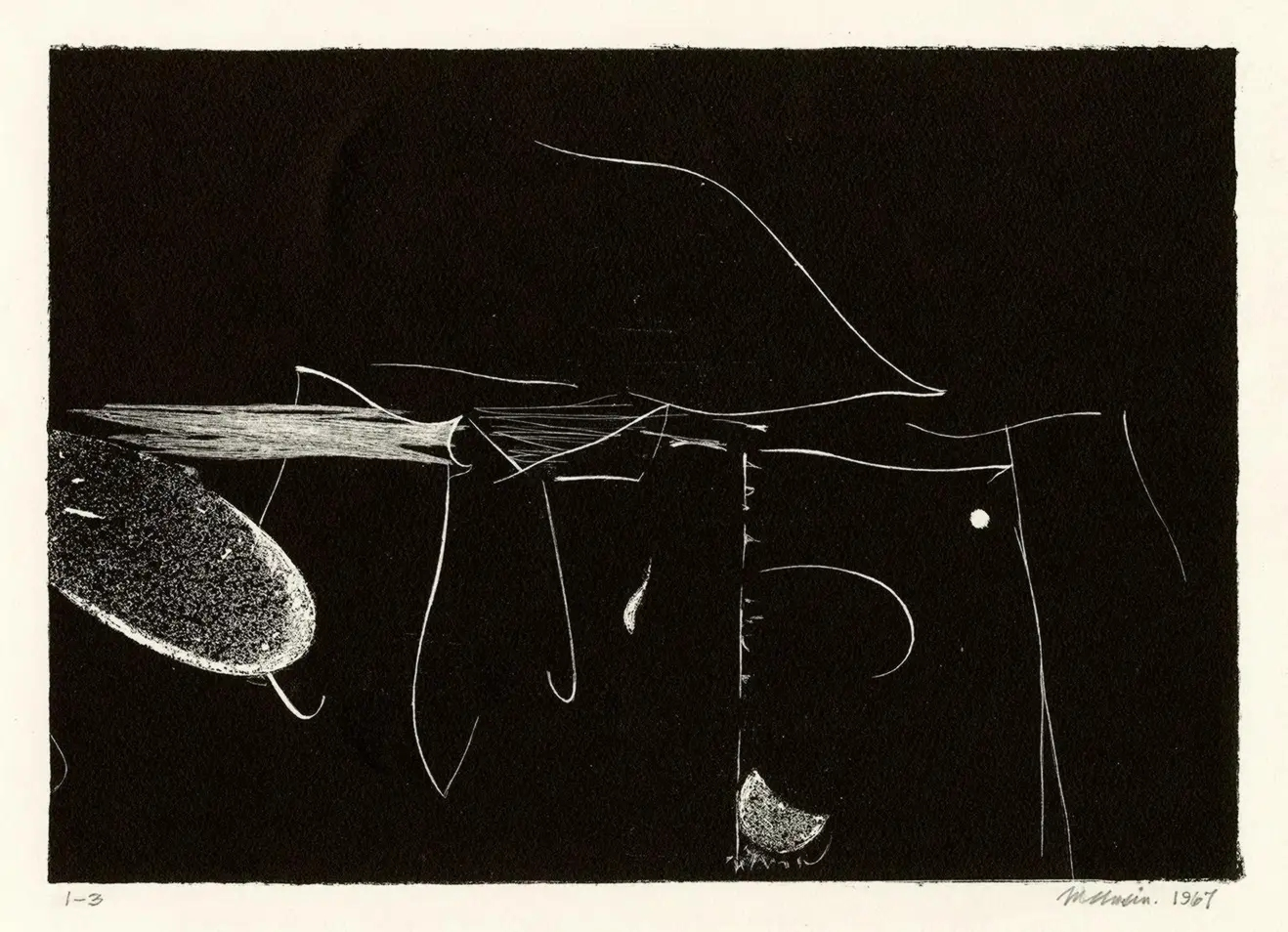
(11) Bumpei Usui, Untitled Abstraction, 1967, Lithograph, 10 1/8 x 13 1/4 inches

Usui showed a flower painting in the first-known public exhibition of his work in 1922 and he continued to produce floral pieces and still lifes during the rest of his career. See, for example, his "Still Life: Kuniyoshi's Studio" of 1930 and "Cat in the Window" of 1932, images number 6 and 7, as representative paintings in this genre. Two years later he made a painting called "14th Street" (shown here, image number 1) that was, many years later, said to suggest the precisionist cityscape style of the 1920s and 1930s. Later in his career he made other cityscapes of a different character. See, for example, "Bronx" and "Backyard Staten Island", both painted in 1933 (images number 8 and 9).

In addition to floral subjects, still lifes, and cityscapes, Usui painted realistic scenes of everyday city life. Two critics, writing in 1929, associated these paintings with a style called American Scene Painting. More recently, critics noted a connection between these urban paintings and paintings in the Ashcan style that flourished during the 1920s and 1930s. Usui's urban paintings were seen at the time to distinguish themselves from other urban realist works at least partly because of their humor. Critics in the mid-1920s credited him with, as one said, a "humorous outlook on the American scene". In variations on this thought, other critics found his work to be "clever" and "exceedingly smart". In general, critics used terms like "cultivated realism", "linear harmony", "delicacy of color", and "gracious handling" to describe his paintings. Writing in 1935 a critic discussed the skill with which Usui achieved a "peaceful feeling" in one of his landscapes and called him an "able colorist" who had "a charming feeling for textures". In 2014 a curator for the Metropolitan Museum praised Usui's "experimentation with perspective and proportions". See Usui's "Harbor Scene" of 1929 (image number 4) and "Round Out Old Section, Kingston, New York" of 1949 (image number 11) for examples of paintings in which critics saw these characteristics.

During his career some critics noted the influence of Japanese art in Usui's work while others saw no such influence. One of the first serious considerations of his work, published in 1922, treated it as thoroughly American. Quoting a study by the head of the Tokyo School of Fine Arts, Okakura Kakuzō, the article said Usui and other Japanese artists in New York adopted Western traditions of art in reaction to "the universal condemnation of Eastern customs" then common in the United States. In 1935 a critic said there was nothing Japanese about Usui's paintings, that he and his friends had adopted Western practices, abandoning the technique of their heritage and cultivating an un-Japanese realism. Other critics saw in this work "Japanese versions of the American scene" (1929), called him "a painter who understands the precious quality of the expressive line of his ancestors" (1935), and said his paintings revealed, "something of the tradition of his Japanese ancestors, both in his instinct for space values and in the subtlety of his treatment" (1938). In 1947 a critic struck something of a balance. His flower studies and landscapes, this critic wrote, were quite American yet possessed "delicate touches that remind one that Usui is a Japanese" [sic].

The Usui paintings most frequently mentioned in the press were all made between 1924 and 1930. These included the cityscape, "14th Street" of 1924 (image number 1) and three urban scenes, "Furniture Factory" of 1925 (image number 2), "Party on the Roof" of 1926 (image number 3), and "Sunday Afternoon" of 1929.

Although best known for his oil paintings, Usui also made drawings and lithographs. Examples include "Rooftops and Fire Escape" of 1930 (image number 5) and an untitled abstract of 1967 (image number 11).

== Framer ==
Usui began making frames in 1929 at the request of his friend Kuniyoshi. Having begun by making frames for fellow artists, he soon became known for the quality of his work and obtained clients from designers and decorators, such as Donald Deskey, and collectors, such as Abby Aldrich Rockefeller. In 1935 1935 an article on Usui in the New Yorker said his was the "busiest picture frame shop in New York City right now". He was said to consider the location where the picture would be hung as well as the nature of the picture itself when designing a frame and in some cases advised clients not to use a custom-made frame at all. Writing in 1947, a New York Times critic, Howard Devree, said his would have painted more if he had not been so busy making frames. Late in life his reputation extended beyond New York to the extent that one source wrote that he had become known as one of the best framers in the country.

== Furniture decorator ==
While in London, Usui had used his newly-acquired skill in Queen Anne style lacquering in helping to manufacture modern furniture and furnishings that could pass as centuries old. In New York he was employed by interior decorators to use his lacquering skills on chairs and other furniture. In 2013, a great-niece of Usui's wife, Frances Pratt, told an interviewer that at one time the Steinway Company in Queens employed him to decorate its pianos. His frame making took over from this work in the late 1920s. In 1990 the author of a biography of Yasuo Kuniyoshi said Usui was a successful furniture designer and a more recent work (published in 2013) maintains that he made furniture in his frame shop. However, neither source gives details about his furniture making. When the Metropolitan Museum acquired "Furniture Factory" its announcement noted that the painting showed Usui's close knowledge of the subject.

== Collector and cat breeder ==
Usui accepted works of art in return for the frames he made for fellow artists. He also occasionally bought paintings that he liked but his collection of modern art was a modest one. At some point before World War II he began to assemble a large and valuable collection of Japanese swords and tea bowls and, as an enemy alien, he took the precaution of storing this collection in the homes of his friends during the war. In 1966 he exhibited many of the more valuable swords and twelve years later many of them were stolen from him. Thereafter he sold the balance of the collections in an auction in 1979.

Usui began raising Siamese cats in the 1920s. He depicted cats in one of his earliest paintings—"Back Roof" of 1924—and showed them again in "Girl and Cat" (exhibited in 1930), and a painting called "Cat" (1932). The author of the 1935 New Yorker article on him said Usui sold the cats he raised to supplement income from his framing business. See also "Rooftops and Fire Escape" of 1930 (image number 5).

== Personal life and family ==
The third son in a family of silkworm farmers, Usui was born on February 15, 1898, and raised in Horikin Village, Minami Azumino County, Nagano Prefecture (currently Horikin, Azumino) Japan. A brief account of his life, published in 1935, said his name was pronounced "Boom-pay Oo-soo-ay". At the age of nineteen, he traveled to London where his brother was engaged in buying Western art for the Japanese market. Having learned furniture decorating skills and begun to make paintings, he left London for New York in 1921. During that period, the Japanese government was abiding by an informal agreement that prevented Japanese nationals from settling in the United States. Long after his death a great-niece of Usui's wife, Frances Pratt, said Usui told his family he had evaded immigration authorities by jumping ship in New York harbor. Once settled in the United States, Usui was prohibited from obtaining American citizenship by a 1922 Supreme Court decision, Takao Ozawa v. United States, that said Japanese nationals did not meet the "free white citizen" requirement of a 1790 law.

At some point during his early years in New York Usui married a woman from Kansas City whose given name was Lucille. Sources do not record her surname. They divorced in 1943. On February 16, 1942—about two months following the attack on Pearl Harbor and about a year before his divorce from Lucille—Usui gave another woman, Frances Pratt, as next of kin in registering with his local draft board. On December 26, 1942, Pratt had married a man named Gordius Arminius Ritter, known as Chris Ritter. Both Pratt and Ritter were artists. They divorced in 1954. A city directory for 1942 lists both Usui and Pratt at the same address and having the same phone number (33 East 12th Street in Manhattan, Algonquin 4-5062). During World War II Usui was under surveillance as an enemy alien and was regularly questioned by agents of the Federal Bureau of Investigation but was not interned or otherwise incarcerated. During this time he stored his collection of swords in the apartments of friends.

Usui became a citizen and married Pratt three years after the Immigration and Nationality Act of 1952 granted Japanese-Americans the right to obtain citizenship. Pratt had been born in New Jersey in 1913 and died in New York in 2003. She studied art at the New York School of Applied Design for Women, going on to the Art Students League and the Hans Hoffman School. She began exhibiting her work in 1941. She subsequently co-authored works on Encaustic painting and Pre-Columbian art and became a notable collector of the latter.

Friends called Usui by his last name rather than his given name. He lived and worked in Greenwich Village during most of his career.

He died in March 1994 and was buried with his wife in Nicholson Cemetery in Nicholson, Pennsylvania. The grave is marked by a gravestone she designed.
