= Kohei Fujito =

Japanese contemporary artist (born 1978)

- Born: Kohei Fujito; 1978 (age 47–48); Akan, Kushiro-city, Hokkaido, Japan
- Known for: Mixed Media, Folk Art, Industrial Design
- Notable work: Ikupasuy (2017)
- Style: Contemporary
- Movement: Contemporary Ainu Folk Art

Kohei Fujito (藤戸康平, Fujito Kōhei; born 1978) is a Japanese contemporary artist whose works blend Ainu folk art with industrial design, and is best known for his active promotion of indigenous Japanese art, culture, and history.

== Artistic career ==
Fujito's East Asian visual art mediums predominantly encompass mixed media, folk arts, and industrial design. The popularization of Ainu art brought about by the 1941 Ainu Crafts and Culture exhibition in Tokyo's Japan Folk Crafts Museum spurred a new generation of Ainu Japanese artists like Fujito whose works continue to garner widespread acclaim in response to the ever-expanding global celebrations of indigenous identities.

In addition to his studies of Ainu culture, Fujito incorporates patterns and designs from his forebears within 21st Century consumer products such as eyeglasses, iPhone cases, and watches in an eclectic fusion of local historic Ainu craftsmanship and modern practicality.

In 2017, the International Festival of Indigenous People in Italy commissioned Fujito to create a monument for the occasion, to which he conceived Ikupasuy.

== Personal life ==
Born and based near Lake Akan, Kushiro, Hokkaido, Fujito is a member of the indigenous Ainu population where he manages the local shop "Kuma no Ie (House of the Bear)" in the town of Akan. He received artistic training from his father, Takeki Fujito (born 1934), an internationally renowned woodcarver who specializes in lifelike depictions of local residents and animals.

== Exhibitions and projects ==
Exhibitions

- 2012: Ainu Art: Storytellers of the Wind - Matsuura Takeshiro Memorial Museum - Matsusaka, Japan
- 2020: Special Display: Contemporary Ainu Art by Kohei Fujito - Daiwa Anglo-Japanese Foundation - London, United Kingdom
- 2020: Ainu Art: Oki Kano and Kohei Fujito
- 2021 - 2022: Exposure: Native Art and Political Ecology - IAIA Museum of Contemporary Native Art - Santa Fe, New Mexico, United States

Projects

- Utilization of Timber from Hokkaido
- LEXUS NEW TAKUMI PROJECT

== Museum collections ==
- National Museum of Japanese History and Folklore
- National Museum of Ethnology
