= Yoshida Kenji =

Japanese contemporary artist (1924-2009)

Yoshida Kenji

Yoshida Kenji (Japanese: 吉田堅治); May 24, 1924 – February 24, 2009) was a Japanese artist who created abstract works exploring themes of "La Vie et La Paix" (Life and Peace).

== Life and career ==
Yoshida was born in Ikeda, near Osaka, Japan. After studying art at Ikeda Normal School, he was conscripted into the Japanese Navy in 1944 and trained as a kamikaze pilot. The end of World War II in 1945 spared him from this fate, but the experience profoundly influenced his artistic philosophy. Following the war, Yoshida worked as an art teacher in Osaka and later Tokyo. In 1964, at age 40, he resigned his teaching position and moved to Paris to pursue art. There he studied at Atelier 17, the influential print workshop founded by Stanley William Hayter.

In 1972, the French government granted him permission to live and work in Montparnasse, where he remained for most of his life. The death of his wife from cancer in 1986 marked a significant turning point in his artistic development. Yoshida returned to Japan shortly before his death from cancer on February 24, 2009, at age 84.

== Artistic work ==
From 1978 onward, Yoshida titled all his paintings simply "La Vie" (Life), explaining: "instead of expressing the ever-changing moment of life, I should express one immovable moment of life." His work combined oil on canvas with gold, silver, or platinum leaf, creating luminous surfaces with exceptional depth. This technique developed in the 1980s reflected both Japanese artistic traditions and Western abstract sensibilities, placing him in an ambiguous position between cultures that contributed to his critical neglect. Yoshida's most ambitious work was a 12-panel installation titled "Place of Prayer," dedicated to world peace, which traveled to major cathedrals across the UK and Ireland between 2000-2003.

== Major exhibitions ==
- 1993: "La Vie," British Museum, London (the first solo exhibition of a living artist in the museum's history)
- 1997: "Yoshida Kenji EL ANTIGUO JAPON Y LO MAYA," Museo de Arte Moderno, Mexico City
- 2000-2003: "LA VIE THE ACT OF LIVING" installation at Christ Church Cathedral (Dublin), Norwich Cathedral, and Canterbury Cathedral
- 2006: "La Vie et la Paix de Yoshida Kenji," Blois Castle, France
- 2008: "VIE ET PAIX," UNESCO Headquarters, Paris

== Collections ==
- The British Museum
- RAK Art Foundation
