= Komuro Suiun =

Japanese painter

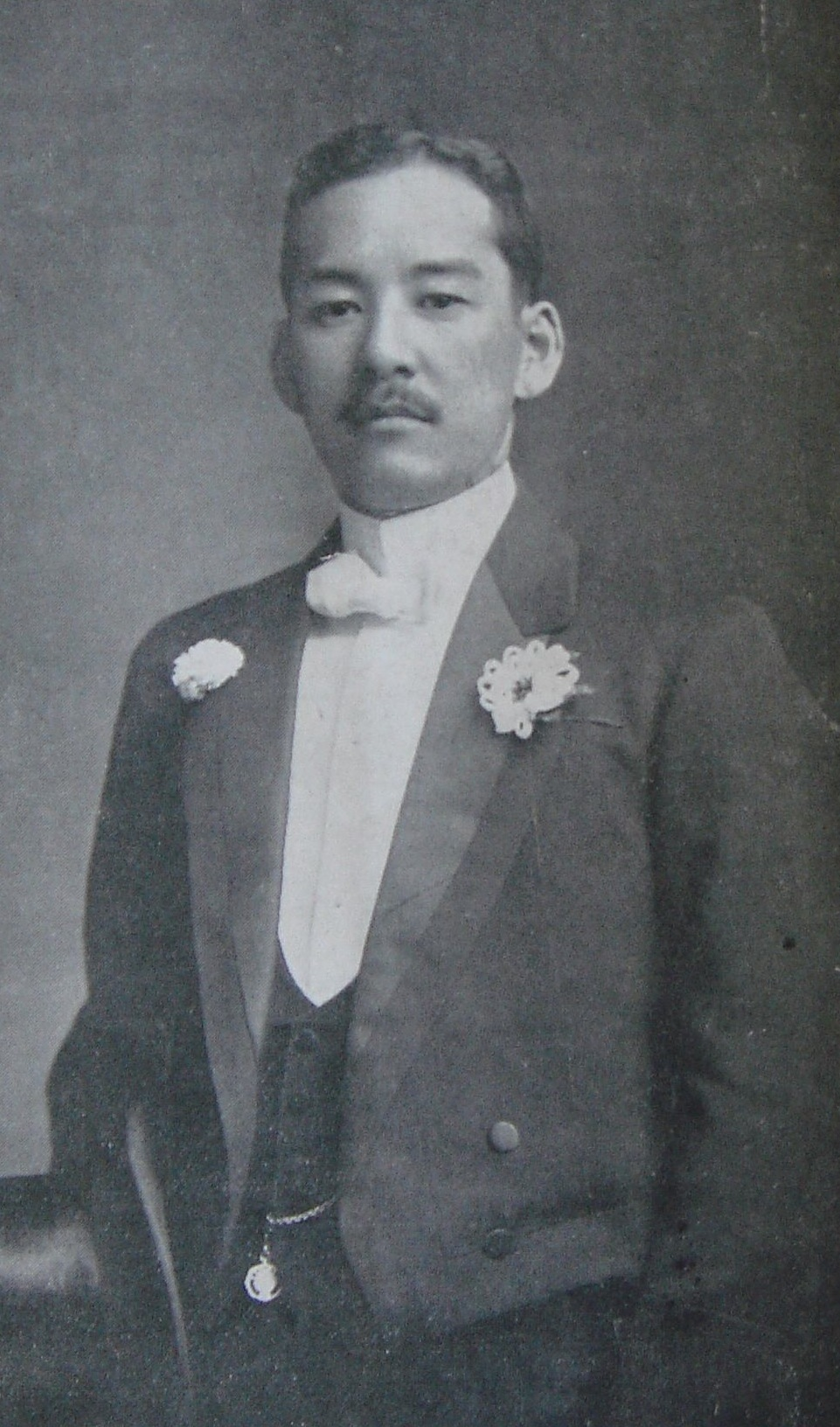
- Born: Komuro Teijirō; August 31, 1874; Tatebayashi, Gunma, Japan
- Died: March 30, 1945 (aged 70); Tokyo, Japan
- Known for: Painting
- Movement: Nihonga, Nanga

Komuro Suiun (Japanese: 小室翠雲, August 31, 1874 – March 30, 1945) is the pseudonym of a Japanese nihonga painter who worked mainly in the nanga style, active from the Meiji period (1868–1912) to the Shōwa period (1926–1989).

== Biography ==
Suiun was born in the town of Yagoechō, present-day Tatebayashi, in Gunma prefecture. His birth name was Komuro Teijirō (貞次郎). From 1890 until 1898, Suiun studied in the atelier of painter Tazaki Sōun 田崎草雲 (1815–1898) in Ashikaga, Tochigi prefecture. After Suiun had been Sōun's student for about three years, he was given the name Suiun (翠雲).

In September 1899, Suiun moved to Tokyo, where he became active in the Tokyo Nanga Association (東京南画会 Tōkyō Nangakai) and Japan Art Association (日本美術協会 Nihon Bijutsu Kyōkai). In 1905, his entry to exhibition of the Japan Art Association, Noble Character, Pure Moon (Kōfū seigetsu) was awarded Second Prize, and he was made a committee member of the group. His 1907 entry Tall Trees and Rocky Mountains (Kyōrin kanseki) was purchased by the Imperial Household Agency.

In May 1903, painter Noguchi Shōhin 野口小蘋 (1847–1917) adopted Suiun as heir and husband to her daughter, Noguchi Shōkei (野口小蕙, 1878–1944), a painter of the bird-and-flowers genre. For a few years, Suiun exhibited paintings, including his entry Solitary Duck in Spring Scenery (Shuntei no kokamo) to the Saint Louis World's Fair in 1904, under the name Noguchi Suiun. He reverted to using the name Komuro when the marriage was annulled in November 1906.

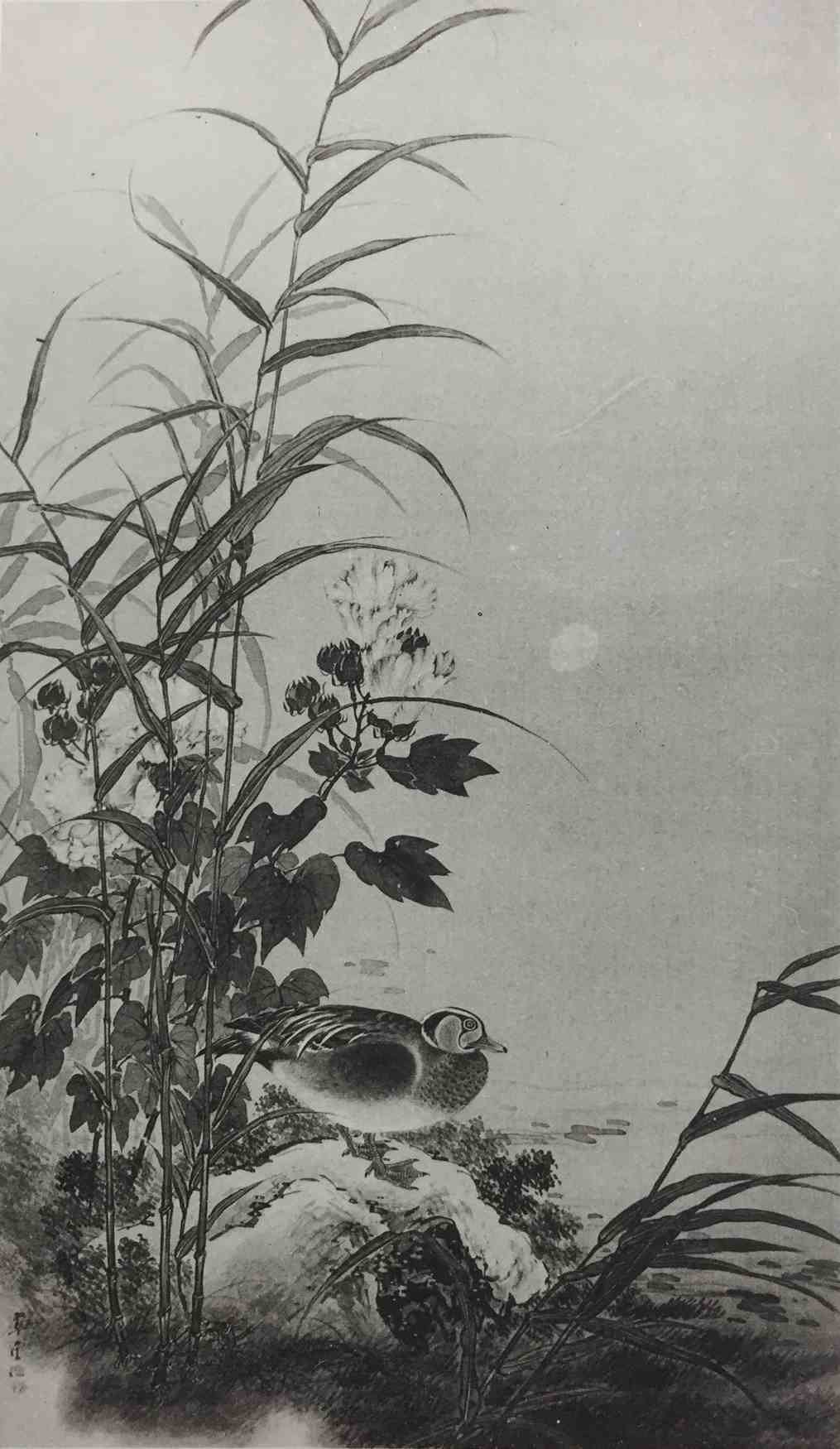
Solitary Duck in Spring Scenery (春景の孤鴨 Shuntei no kokamo, 1904, Saint Louis Art Museum.

In 1907, Suiun was one of several artists to boycott the inaugural exhibition Bunten, the Ministry of Education Art Exhibition, over the appointment of a jury dominated by representatives associated with the Japan Art Institute (Nihon Bijutsuin 日本美術院). He served as Vice Chair of the Society of Orthodox Schools (正派同志会 Seiha Dōshikai), a coalition of individuals and art societies united in opposition against the organization of Bunten.

From 1908 until 1943, with the exception of the 1937 event, Suiun submitted paintings to Bunten and its later incarnations Teiten and Shin-Bunten annually. His first four entries were each awarded Third Prize. His sixth entry, Winter Forest, Quiet Hermitage (Kanrin yūkyō), was awarded Second Prize and Suiun was appointed as a judge for the exhibition.

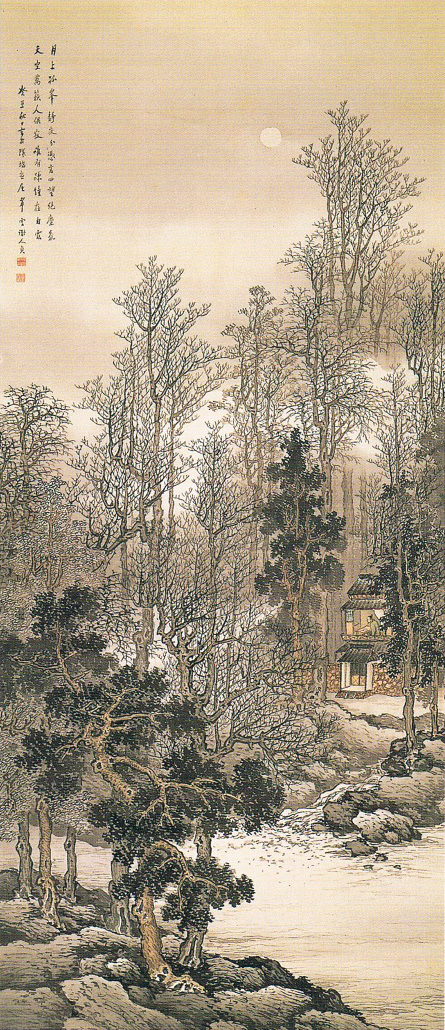
Winter Forest, Quiet Hermitage (寒林幽居 Kanrin yūkyō), 1913, Sannomaru Shōzōkan, Imperial Household Collections.

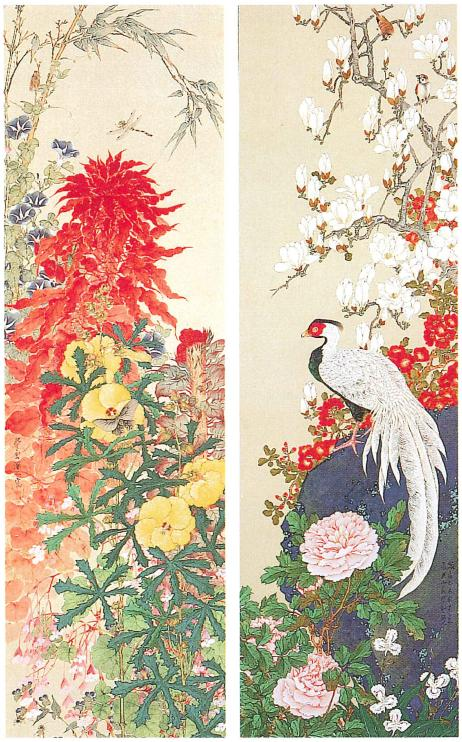
Spring and Autumn Gardens (春庭・秋圃 Shuntei shūho), 1919, Sannomaru Shōzōkan, Imperial Household Collections.

In 1921, Suiun traveled to China and Korea for the first time. Following his return, he created a number of paintings based on his experiences including Southern Water and Northern Land (Nansen hokuba), exhibited at the third Teiten in 1921; Watching the Tide at Haining (Kainei kanchō), exhibited at the fourth Teiten in 1922; and The Fallen Hairpin (Dakinsaizu); exhibited at the second exhibition of the Japan Nanga Institute (Nihon Nangain 日本南画院) in 1922.

On his return to Japan, Suiun was invited to join the Japan Nanga Institute (Nihon Nangain), a collective founded in Kyoto 1921 by a group of six artists, Mizuta Chikuho (1883–1958), Kōno Shūson (1890–1987), Mitsui Hanzan (1881–1934), Yamada Kaidō (1870–1924), Ikeda Keisen (1863–1931), and Tajika Chikuson (1864–1922). Suiun assumed leadership of the group until disbanding it in 1936 due to internal disagreements. The final annual exhibition of the Japan Nanga Institute was attended by French artist and writer Jean Cocteau (1889–1963).

Suiun was selected to travel to Berlin as the main representative of the Japan-German Friendship Special Envoy on the occasion of the German government's exhibition, Contemporary Nihonga (Jp.: Gendai Nihonga Ten, Ger.: Werke Lebender Japanischer Maler), held from January 17 to February 28, 1931, at the Prussian Academy of Arts. He exhibited a diptych, Insect Choir (Kiin nidai), now in the collection of the Asian Art Museum, National Museums in Berlin. After his official duties were completed, Suiun traveled to France, Italy, Egypt, Ceylon (Sri Lanka), India, mainland US, and Honolulu, before returning to Yokohama on July 9, 1931.

During his journey, his ink painting Woman of Berlin (Berurin fujinga) was sent back to Japan. Another painting of a young European woman, Beauty (Reijin), a half-length portrait in ink and light colors, was exhibited at the tenth annual Japan Nanga Institute exhibition in 1931. Silent Man of Stone (Sekijin mugo), depicting the Great Sphinx of Giza, was exhibited at Teiten in 1931.

In April 1932, Suiun founded the Nanga Appreciation Society (南画鑑賞会 Nanga Kanshōkai). Its goal was to popularize the appreciation and practice of nanga among the general public. The Nanga Appreciation Society issued two publications: Records of Nanga Kanshō (Nanga Kanshō Roku), a serialized painting manual, published from 1932, and a monthly magazine, Nanga Kanshō, produced from January 1934 to February 1944.

In 1941, Suiun founded the Greater East Asia Southern School Institute (大東南宗院 Daitō Nanshūin) with members of the Nanga Appreciation Society and former Japan Nanga Institute. The Greater East Asia Southern School Institute opened exhibitions of nanga painting in 1942 and 1943. The first exhibition opened in Tokyo, Kyoto, Nanjing, Shanghai, Beijing, and Shinkyō (Ch.: Xinjing, present-day Changchun), with support from President of the Republic of China in Nanjing, Wang Jingwei (1883–1944), the Special Services Agency (Tokumu Kikan, an intelligence unit of the Japanese military), and other government agencies. The exhibition was projected to open the following year at the same venues and in Seoul, but due to the escalation of the war, it was only held in the Japanese and Korean venues.

During the Fifteen Years War, Suiun rarely created paintings with overtly war-related themes, preferring instead subject matter that could be accommodated within the conventions of nanga while still communicating patriotic sentiments. For example, his entry for the 1942 Shin-Bunten with Free as a Bird (Enpi gyoyaku), which depicted a kite, a bird with an institutionalized military association through the decoration Order of the Golden Kite (Kinshi kunshō), established in 1890.

== Noted works ==
- Winter Forest, Quiet Hermitage (寒林幽居 Kanrin yūkyō), 1913, Sannomaru Shōzōkan, Imperial Household Collections. Second Prize at the seventh Bunten.
- Gentle Spring Rain (春雨蕭々 Shun’u shōshō), 1920, The Museum of Modern Art, Gunma.
- Phoenix and the rising sun (朝陽鳴鳳凰之図 ), 1925, Sannomaru Shōzōkan, Imperial Household Collections. Commissioned by the Bank of Japan as an anniversary gift to the Taishō Emperor and Empress.
- Old Pine and Hawk (老松に鷹 Rōshō ni taka), 1930, Eiheiji Temple.
- Woman of Berlin (ベルリン婦人画 Berurin fujinga), 1931. Tatebayashi City Museum.
- White Universe (白乾坤 Hakukenkon), 1936, Japan Art Academy.

== Honors ==
- 1944: Imperial Household Artist
