= Sukenobu =

Sukenobu (written: 祐信, 輔信 or 資順) is a masculine Japanese given name. Notable people with the name include:

- Sukenobu Kudō (工藤 祐信, 1927–2012), Japanese speed skater
- Nishikawa Sukenobu (西川 祐信, 1671–1750), Japanese printmaker
- Ōta Sukenobu (太田 資順, 1762–1808), Japanese daimyō
- Takatsukasa Sukenobu (鷹司 輔信, 1683–1744), Japanese kugyō

== See also ==
- Sukenobu Station, a railway station in Hamamatsu, Shizuoka Prefecture, Japan
