= Fujiwara no Takanobu =

Japanese portrait artists

Fujiwara Takanobu, Portrait of Yoritomo, 1179

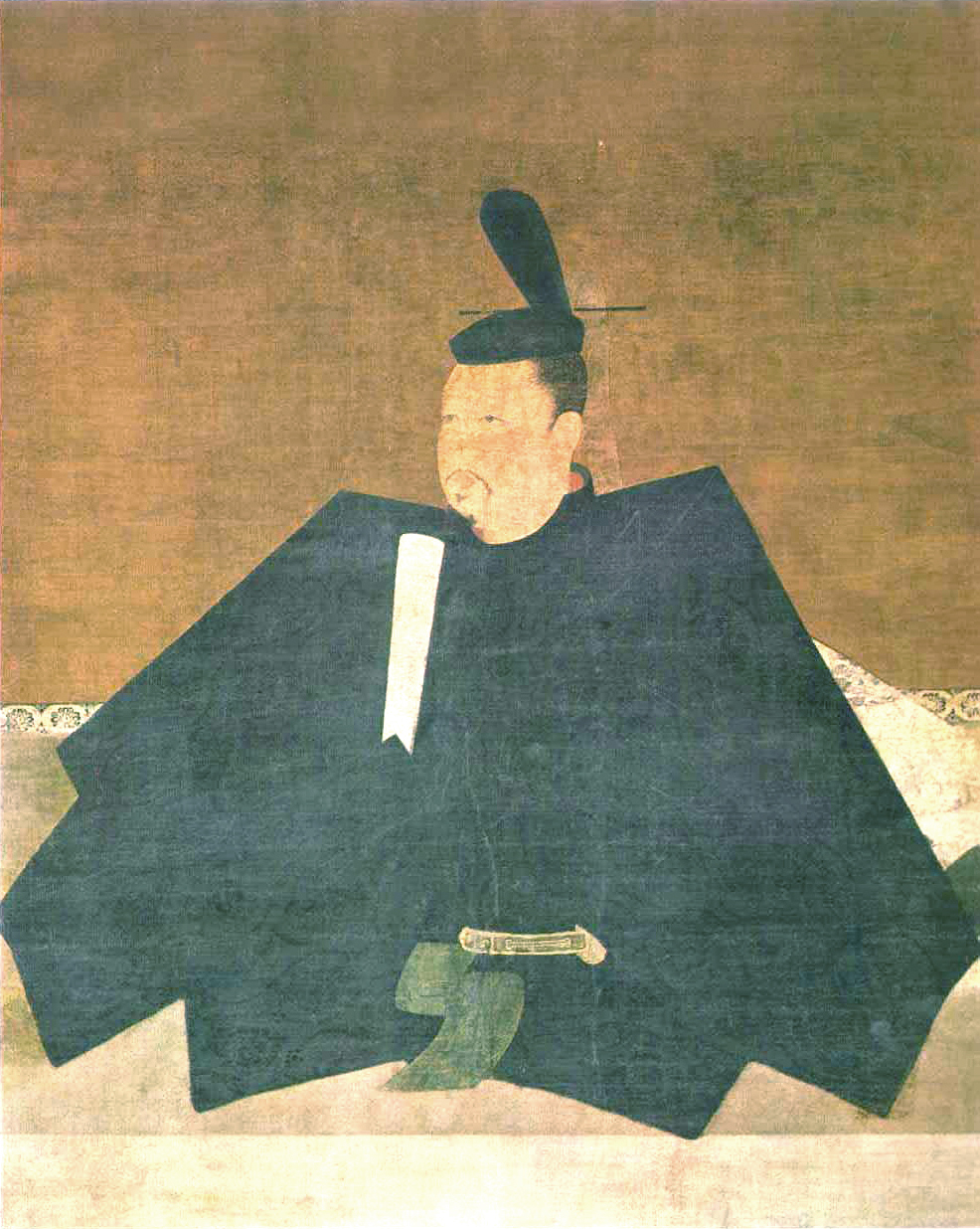
Fujiwara Takanobu, Portrait of Taira no Shigemori or Portrait of Ashikaga Takauji

Fujiwara no Takanobu (Japanese: 藤原 隆信) (1142–1205) was one of the leading Japanese portrait artists of his day.

== Life and career ==
Takanobu was born in Kyoto, and was the half-brother of Fujiwara no Sadaie, one of Japan's greatest poets. Takanobu specialized in nise-e (“likeness picture”) portraits, except instead of painting on small-size paper Takanobu painted on scrolls over a meter in height and width. Only three of his works have survived, the most notable is of Minamoto no Yoritomo, the founder of the Kamakura government.

== Legacy ==
Takanobu's son Nobuzane carried on the family tradition of painting.

== See also ==
- Nise-e
- Yamato-e
- Kamakura period
