= Toeko Tatsuno =

Toeko Tatsuno (Japanese: 辰野登恵子; born Toeko Naka (Japanese: 中 登恵子); 13 January 1950 – 19 September 2014) was a Japanese abstract painter, printmaker, and former professor at Tama Art University in Japan.

== Biography ==
=== Early life and education (1950-1974) ===
Toeko Tatsuno was born in Okaya City, Nagano Prefecture, in Japan. She began painting when she was a junior high school student. She was studying at Suwa Futaba High School in Nagano Prefecture in March 1963. At that time, she was greatly influenced by the leading contemporary artists of the time, represented by Jasper Johns and Andy Warhol.

In April of the same year, she entered the Department of Painting at the Tokyo National University of Fine Arts and Music. During her undergraduate years, she formed an artistic group, Cosmos Factory (Japanese: 「コスモ・ファクトリー」) with two of her classmates, Toshio Shibata and Shin’ichi Kamatani. In the aftermath of the Japanese university protests, when regular classes were not held, they created a dark space in the corner of the empty classroom to reproduce photographs and create silk screens. By silk-screening with photomechanical printing presses, she established her style of incorporating existing images and photographs into her work. Tatsuno mentioned that the style was born from a situation where "the act of painting on canvas with a brush was considered completely old-fashioned". Following her first exhibition in 1970, the Cosmos Factory had a group exhibition in the Gallery Muramatsu (Japanese: 村松画廊, romanized: Matsumura-Garō) in 1971 and 1973. She graduated with her bachelor’s degree in 1972 and her master’s degree in 1974 from the same university. From 1974 to 1975, she worked as an assistant painter in the university’s printmaking department.

=== Career and later life (1974–2014) ===
After graduation, she broadened her activities and participated in numerous exhibitions. In 1995, at the age of 45, she held her solo exhibition at the National Museum of Modern Art, Tokyo as the youngest artist ever. The following year, she became the first female painter to be awarded the Mainichi Art Award. In 2004, she began teaching at Tama Art University, which was innovative when there were few full-time female faculty members. From 2011 to 2012, she produced lithographs at the Idem studio in Paris, France. She died on 29 September 2014 due to metastatic liver cancer at the age of 64.

== Artistic style: printmaking to painting ==
In her early career, Tatsuno experimented with prints and drawings, using the figuration of differences created by the strength and slight blurring of line drawings inspired by the repetition of grid and stripe lines from tile walls.

Though inspired by Roy Lichtenstein’s techniques, she prided herself on originality. From the 1980s, she began to create continuous patterns of arabesques, diamonds, squares, spheres, and a wide variety of botanical and geometric motifs, working in painting and opening the possibility of contemporary ‘painting’ by relying on incomplete and concrete forms. After the 1990s, she continued to boldly depict a series of elementary forms, including spheres, rectangles, and corrugated shapes in the space of large paintings supported by gorgeous colours and heavy textures.

== Selected exhibitions ==
Solo Exhibitions

- 1973, 1974, and 1975: Gallery Muramatsu, Tokyo, Japan
- 1978: Gallery Tagagi, Nagoya, Japan
- 1989: Satani Gallery, Tokyo, Japan
- 1990: Goto Museum of Art, Chiba, Japan
- 1995: Toeko Tatsuno 1986–1995, The National Museum of Modern Art, Tokyo, Japan
- 1998: Koji Ogra Gallery: Nagoya, Japan
- 2001: Nishimura Gallery, Tokyo, Japan
- 2016: Thematic Show: Tatsuno Toeko, Utsunomiya Museum of Art, Hyogo, Japan
- 2016: Toeko Tatsuno’s Trajectory (Japanese: 「辰野登恵子の軌跡―イメージの視覚化―」), BB Plaza Museum of Art, Hyogo, Japan
- 2022 Toeko Tatsuno: Expressing the Perceptions of the Body (「辰野登恵子：身体的近くによる版表現」), BB Plaza Museum of Art, Hyogo, Japan

Major Group Exhibitions

- 1980 Art Today '80: Painting Matters: Beyond the Romanticism (「Art Today '80 絵画の問題展：ロマンティックなものをこえて」), Seibu Museum of Art (西武美術館), Tokyo, Japan
- 1984–85: Perspectives on Contemporary Art: Metaphors and/ or Symbols (Japanese: 「現代美術への視点 メタファーとシンボル」), The National Museum of Modern Art, Tokyo, Japan; The National Museum of Modern Art, Kyoto, Japan; The National Museum of Art, Osaka, Japan
- 1987 Paintings 1977–1987, The National Museum of Art, Osaka, Japan
- 1989 Europia '89 Japan, S. M. A. K., the Municipal Museum of Contemporary Art, Ghent, Belgium
- 1990 Japan art today: Elusive Perspectives/ Changing Visions (「現代日本美術の多様展」), Sezon Museum of Modern Art, Nagano, Japan
- 1994: Japanese Art after 1945: Scream against the Sky (Japanese: 「戦後日本の前衛美術」), Yokohama Museum of Art, Kanagawa, Japan; Guggenheim Museum, New York, the US; San Francisco Museum of Modern Art, California, US
- 1995: The 22nd Sao Paulo Biennial, Sao Paulo, Brazil
- 1995: Art in Japan Today 1985-1995 (「日本の現代美術1985-1995」), Museum of Contemporary Art Tokyo, Tokyo, Japan
- 2001–2004: Tsubaki-kai 2001 (「椿会展2001」), Shiseido Gallery, Tokyo, Japan
- 2002: The Unfinished Century: Legacies of 20th Century Art (「未完の世紀-20世紀美術がのこすもの」), The National Museum of Modern Art, Tokyo, Japan
- 2004-’05 Traces: Bodies and Thoughts in Postwar Art (「痕跡-戦後美術における身体と思考展」), The National Museum of Modern Art, Kyoto, Japan; The National Museum of Modern Art, Tokyo, Japan
- 2012 Given Forms: Toeko Tatsuno and Toshio Shibata (「与えられた形象 辰野登恵子 柴田敏雄」), The National Art Center, Tokyo, Japan

== Awards ==
- 1995 The 46th Art Encouragement Prize for New Artists (第46回 芸術選奨文部大臣新人賞)
- 2013 The 54th Mainichi Art Award (第54回 毎日芸術賞)
