= Tadao Okazaki =

Artist

Tadao Okazaki (Tokyo. 1943) is a Japanese artist. Okazaki and his ancestors have belonged to the Soto Sect of Zen Buddhism. Today, he lives in the Japanese North-east by former Fushiguro Village where his ancestors and parents had lived. His parents were successful wholesale merchants in Tokyo until the World War II. Two of his mother's brothers were air force pilots and died over the Pacific:

== Early life ==
- Fukushima High School, Fukushima: 3 years—In addition to conventional studies, he continued the study of representative painting, and his watercolor was selected and awarded special prize in The National Student Fine Art Exhibition, Tokyo
- English C350-A204, Creative Writing, Poetry, University of Wisconsin- Extension, Madison, Wisconsin; July 12, 1994
- Elements of Effective Writing, Writer's Digest School, Cincinnati, Ohio; December 15, 1989

=== Non-conventional school education ===
- Charles Reid, Member, The National Academy of Design, U.S.A. and The Century Club, New York—Okazaki was taught watercolor techniques for over five years.
- Kay Sato, Fine Artist and art teacher at Fushiguro and Date schools, Fukushima, Japan
- Toru Suzuki, Ceramicist, Fukushima, Japan
- Tom McKeown, Poet, Wisconsin

== Related work experience ==
- 2013–2012- The 3-11 triple disaster placed Tad in the tragedy and heroic efforts for recovery. Okazaki invited the stricken Fukushima and Tokyo audience into the wide Ma void of his paintings, and encouraged them to use it in their traditional manner at the times of hardships—writing in the Ma space one word each from the Heart Sutra, the central Zen teaching of Buddha stating the physical basis of all being: That nothing stays the same, that All are nothing.
- 2006- Joined Christo and Jeanne-Claude, Andy Warhol et al. at the ATOA auction at Chelsea Museum, New York, November 13. – To build a fund to provide a forum for critical discussions in the visual arts.
- Kay Sato, Fine Artist and teacher at Fushiguro and Date schools, Fukushima, Japan. – Sato was a graduate of The Musashino Art University, Tokyo, Japan, one of the oldest and most prestigious private art schools in Japan. He painted mostly representative landscapes and still-life's and regularly exhibited in Tokyo and Fukushima solo and group shows. In addition to tutoring art school candidates, and to giving private lessons, he taught fine art classes in public schools in Fukushima. He preached a spiritual approach in addition to teaching the rules of image-making. He imposed Okazaki the strict principles of representative painting. To Okazaki's eye, Kay Sato wanted to protect him from the emerging abstract paintings which "lacked talent or discipline." It was in the 1950s and 1960s. He was though a modest person, and never boasted about his successful Christian families, the prestigious art school he graduated from or prizes he received. He died in the early 1990s at his home by the village where Okazaki lived.
- Toru Suzuki, Ceramicist, Fukushima, Japan—Suzuki studied ceramics under Saichi Matumoto of Kutani; at Ibaraki Ceramics School; and under Mamoru Teramoto of Kasama, Japan. His works were accepted and/or awarded prizes in many exhibitions. The galleries of major department stores have hosted his solo exhibitions. He has appeared in TV's, and teaches at public and private classes. His works are collected by professionals and artists including a member of the National Academy of Design, USA. He currently keeps Tohzanbo Kama Kiln, and lives in Kohri, Fukushima.
- Tom McKeown, Poet, Wisconsin—McKeown is an American poet; Thomas Shanks McKeown, born on September 29, 1937, in Evanston, Illinois. He taught Okazaki the principle supporting both visual and verbal, and possibly many other arts. He learned from him simple images and lean words—which joined Okazaki's blood naturally. His poems appeared in Atlantic Monthly, Harpers, The New yorker, Yale Review et., and Three Hundred Tigers (Zephyr Press 1994) and other books of his poetry.
- University of Wisconsin poetry writing course—Their English course C350‐A204, Creative Writing, Poetry, was where Okazaki was lucky to be taught by Tom McKeown. Okazaki completed it July 12, 1994, with a "Very Good to Excellent" evaluation.

== Honors and awards ==
Full Member: Hudo-Kai, Tokyo 2003
Star Exhibitor: The Photographic Society of America, 1979
Honors: 1978 North American International Photographic Exhibition; 1978 Southwest International Exhibition of Photography; 1978 Northwest International Exhibition; 1977 Toronto International Salon; 1963 Japanese National Student Fine Art Exhibition.

== Workshops and organizations ==
2013–2003 – Hudo-Kai, Full Member and Treasurer
2013–2010 – The National Public Broadcasting Society (NHK) Culture Center, Watercolor Workshop Lecturer
2013–2003 – The Japanese Aquarelle Society, Founder and Board Member
2012–2003 – Oze National Park workshops and shows
2010–2006 – San-Osha Gallery, Inc. Workshops

== Exhibitions ==
- 2013–2005 – annually: San-osha Gallery, Inc.
- 2012–2003 – annually: Chozo-Goya, Oze National Park
- 2012–2002 – annually: Tokyo Central Museum of Fine Arts / Tokyo Ginza Museum Gallery (joint solo.)
- 2011 – "Tadao Okazaki: Ma Painting"—Elga Wimmer Art Gallery, Chelsea NYC; one and quarter months, February–March 2011
- 2010 – "Imagine – The Viewers' Ma"– Sylvia Wald & Poe Kim Art Gallery, East Village NYC; one month, May–June 2010
- 2007 – New York Asian Contemporary Art Fair
- 2006 – New York TCI Gallery Three Friends Exhibition
- 2006 – Chelsea Museum Artist Talk on Art: auctioned with Andy Warhol, Christo et al.
- 2005 – Tokyo Artbox Gallery, Inc. (group)
- 2004 – Gaku Gallery, Inc., Tokyo (Hudokai)
- 2000 – Japanese Watercolor Society National Exhibition
- 1999 – National Watercolor Divisions: Hakujitsu Kai; Toko Kai; Jigen Kai; Shin Kaiju Sha Fine Art Societies
- 1999 – Japanese Watercolor Society National Exhibition
- 1978 – Photographic Society of America International Convention Exhibition; North American International Photographic Exhibition; Northwest Photographic Salon; San Antonio International Salon of Photography; San Francisco Chinatown International Exhibition of Photography; Calgary Stampede International Salon of Pictorial Photography; Mid-Missouri Camera Club International Salon of Photography; British Columbia International Exhibition of Photography; San Antonio International Exhibition; Southwestern International Exhibition of Photography; Photographica de Arte Exhibition of Photography; 1977—Southwestern Michigan Council of Camera Clubs International Exhibition of Photography; Northwest International Exhibition of Photography; Toronto International Salon of Photography; San Antonio International Exhibition of Photography; Calgary Stampede International Salon of Pictorial Photography; Santa Clara Valley International Exhibition of Photography; The Perceptive Eye, AAO Gallery, 207 Delaware Avenue, Buffalo, New York
- 1963—Japanese National Student Fine Art Exhibition

== The birth of Ma concept and American nature abstraction paintings ==
Japan is known for its love of "Ma," or "negative" or "relative" space between objects or between time-points. Although Japan is expected to have numerous paintings enjoying the void of Ma, it is difficult to actually identify the ones that use the physical void:

Most of the paintings known for their "space" have spaces of varying gradations of values, which simply represent air, mist, fog or cloud—Visual void is not relevant here. A typical example is the famous "Pine Woods," National Treasure of Japan, P161, Vol.12 The Complete Works of Japanese Art, Kodansha 1992, by Hasegawa Tohaku, which was one exception to his mostly decorative paintings of space‐occupying images resembling those of the Kanoh School.

Rather, Okazaki considers the famous cloud-like "Suyari-kasumi" ("Lance-fog,") painted like wide horizontal fingers of clouds which hide strategic areas of bird's-eye sceneries are actually a small "Ma" that functions to create physical, temporal and psychological spaces in ancient Japanese paintings (p186, Vol. 12., The Complete Works of Japanese Arts, Kodansha 1992.)

Japan does have some works which have functioning visual void in the paintings such as "Shrike," Important National Cultural Asset of Japan, P232, Vol.17, The Complete Works of Japanese Arts, Kodansha 1992, by Miyamoto Musashi, the swordsman‐author‐artist of the 17th century.

Hosokawa Nariyuki, also a noted samurai like Musashi, above, has an episode significant enough to a student of Ma:

After receiving a consent from another samurai to add a verse to his finished landscape painting of the southern Kishuh (Wakayama Prefecture) Pacific coast, Hosokawa respectfully produced a completely blank sheet of Kozo mulberry paper—and the other samurai calmly obliged by calligraphing a verse along the top of the sheet.

One explanation is that because all, including the beautiful Kishuh coast vista, is nothing after all, as known in Zen, blank space which is filled only with light also should legitimately represent the true scenery (P168, Vol. 12, The Complete Works of Japanese Arts, Kodansha 1992; P162, Vol.16, The Complete Works of Japanese Arts, Gakushuh Kenkyuhsha, 1996.)

One explanation is that because all, including the beautiful Kishuh coast vista, is nothing, void, after all, as known in Zen, blank space on paper also should legitimately represent the true scenery (P168, Vol. 12, The Complete Works of Japanese Arts, Kodansha 1992; P162, Vol.16, The Complete Works of Japanese Arts, Gakushuh Kenkyuhsha, 1996.)

(1) In Sept 1979 PSA Journal, his monochromatic photo print already showed a huge Ma (empty space.)
(2) The audience thought Okazaki's representational paintings were like haiku, traditional Japanese triplet poems of mostly iambic tri- tetra- and tri-meters (Haiku-Ballad Principle:) His representational paintings "didn't chatter or explain things too much."
(3) Okazaki felt that even his "haiku-like" paintings had too many unnecessary elements, and he started to fragment (cut) his paintings into multiple pieces.

He went further to satisfy himself by removing colors from many of the fragments—he had been a black-and-white photographic print maker. Okazaki's paintings were exhibited in these fragments on gallery walls. e.g., The Three Friends Exhibition, TCI Gallery, New York 2008. June19 – July 18, 2007; A haiku poem ( " sitting quietly/ in a mountain clearing/ bird song more and more. " by L.A. Davidson, former President of The Haiku Society of America) was written on one of these fragments.

(4) Then he eliminated most of these fragments from a painting; and hung the remaining few pieces on only parts of one wall. e.g., The Hudokai Exhibition, Tokyo Central Museum of Fine Arts 2009 – One Tokyo audience said she could not buy and take home a gallery wall for Okazaki's fragmented paintings.
(5) Next, he re-gathered the remaining fragments in one canvas. e.g., IMAGINE- The Viewer's Ma, Sylvia Wald- Poe Kim Gallery, Inc., NPO, New York 2010.
(6) He reduced the number of the fragments into three or less per painting.
(7) The light was removed from empty space outside the few focal images.
(8) Okazaki started to limit the number and size of his images further – trying to allow viewers' feelings and imagination in the lightless void. e.g., Tadao Okazaki's Ma Painting, Elga Wimmer Gallery, New York 2011 – Ceramics are being produced on Ma principle; Students of representational paintings benefit from principles of Ma; Disaster victims fill the Ma space with their prayer for the dead in Fukushima; Tokyo audience fill the Ma with prayers for recovery in Fukushima. Okazaki wonders if nations can share the global space like the audience and artist share Ma.
(9) "Ma" Paintings is developing – Ceramics are being produced on Ma principle; Students of representational paintings benefit from principles of Ma; The 3-11 earthquake- tsunami- nuclear plant explosion Triple Disaster victims fill the Ma space with their prayer for the dead in Fukushima; Tokyo audience fill the Ma with prayers for recovery in Fukushima. Okazaki wonders if nations can share the global space like the audience and artist share Ma.

== Ma painting ==
Hudokai, Okazaki's limited ten-member national art society, has published over the past 30 years approximately 75-thousand copies of its exhibition catalogues (Founder, Mr. Nobuo Suzuki, 1- 21- 13 Gakuen-Higashi-Machi, Kodaira-Shi, Tokyo 187- 0043; Headquarters, Mr. Takaaki Koba, # 804, Fujimidai 2- 15- 8, Kunitachi-shi, Tokyo 186-0003 Japan.) Each issue carried his painting, among the others', in the following style:

- 2003 Representative landscape – the catalogue of Hudo-Kai joint solo exhibition at Tokyo Central Art Museum. It carried one of Okazaki's landscape paintings. At this time, Okazaki was struggling to paint landscapes that were satisfying and did not know if any of the subject matters on this earth would ever truly satisfy his soul.
- 2004 Representative landscape – these were sometimes described as "Haiku (three-line poem)-like." The catalogue of Hudo-Kai joint solo exhibition at Tokyo Central Art Museum. It carried one of Okazaki's landscape paintings where he was reducing the number of "shapes" in the picture to satisfy his soul – some of the viewers knew he was trying to do the same thing as what he did to his poems – simplifying and making it lean, like a haiku.
- 2005 Abstract landscape – The catalogue of Hudo-Kai joint solo exhibition at Tokyo Central Art Museum. At this time, Okazaki was wondering if he truly needed all the realistic elements that he learned to describe from his beloved and respected teachers. He was starting to re-examine elements in his landscape paintings.

Okazaki cut a painting into sections, and examined each and the whole.

- 2006: fragmentalism landscape
- 2007: fragmentalism landscape

He discarded sections of landscape painting.

- 2008: Ma landscape
- 2009: Ma landscape

He stopped limiting his motif to landscape; limited the number of visual shapes to three – the number of the total lines in one haiku poem.

- 2010: untitled Ma painting
- 2011: untitled Ma painting
- 2012: untitled Ma painting

== Poetry ==
His poems gained such prizes as: Special Prize from "Modern Haiku Magazine" Cicada Prize from "Cicada, the Journal of Canadian Haiku Society" He has published his three-line and free-verse haiku poems in Frogpond; Modern Haiku; Cicada; New Cicada; Bottlerocket; Contemporary Haibun and others.

Published "Free verse haibun" poetry, where the traditionally prose part of haibun is replaced with English free-verse. Okazaki Proposed "Haiku-Ballad Theory," that defines classical haiku form as a tri-meter/ tetra-meter/ tri-meter iambic triplet ballad.

Okazaki is an old member of the Haiku Society of America, and one of very few Japanese who writes and publishes English language poems overseas. He edited New Cicada, an English haiku journal that showcased the works of representative contemporary American and European haiku poets, for 10 years, in Fukushima, Japan.

=== Published comments related to Ma paintings ===
(Comments on previous shows of Tadao Okazaki)

"Beautiful,. . . completely original."

Charles Reid, Member of the National Academy " IMAGINE – Viewers' Ma "

"Tadao Okazaki' s work is a performance of sumi and mulberry paper. The imagination of the reality brought about with his solid descriptive technique gives enormous depth and width to his painting."

".. . audience are enjoying his "Ma" Concept paintings and watermedia works. Ma is how not to fill up a space, and Okazaki's one-month long show in New York City this past May had gathered much praise."

"Okazaki used sumi and mulberry paper in painting 'Untitled,' where the fibers of paper and the flow of sumi inspire the audience toward various imagination and views."

".. . "How not to fill a space" is the "Ma Concept," that Mr. Okazaki has proposed... Every painting carries clear images in only small part of the picture space, and the imagination of the viewer is much activated... His works have been displayed at many domestic and overseas locations, and highly praised... "

"Tadao Okazaki is unique with his apparently informel-like atypical style."

".. . Okazaki's simplified painting style entertains the audience by stimulating their imagination."

== Bibliography ==
- 2012–2003 The Hudo-Kai Annual Exhibition Catalogue, Tokyo – Joint solo exhibitions; with a catalogue Okazaki's pendant piece each year.
- 2012–2004 Annually: All Japan Fine Arts News, Kobe – This art newspaper reported the preceding Hudo-Kai Annual Exhibition, by showing the pendant pieces, and commenting on the artist briefly.
- 2012 Landscape of The Northeast, Nichibo Press, Tokyo – This book carries landscape paintings of 30 painters: It has four of the landscape paintings Okazaki did for his PBS (Japanese "NHK" ) Culture Center Workshop students.
- 2011–2009 The Minpo and Min-yu, Fukushima – Newspaper news of my solo exhibition; without a catalogue.
- 2011–2003 annually: Who's Who in Japanese Art, Bijutsu Club, Tokyo – Japan's oldest Who's Who in Art; some with Okazaki's landscapes – at least one of them showing sign of his fragmentation trial of the landscape.
- 2011 FTV Super News: Ma Show in New York – News on the solo exhibition at Elga Wimmer Gallery, "Tadao Okazaki's Ma Paintings"; without a catalogue.
- 2007 Japanese Public Broadcasting Society (NHK, ) Oze National Park Travelogue – A travelogue in which Okazaki's solo outdoor exhibition (without a catalogue) and workshop were introduced.
- 2005 Journey- Landscapes by Prominent Japanese Painters; Artbox International, Tokyo. – A book sampling one of his landscape paintings.
- 2005–2004 Bijutsu no Mado, Tokyo – News articles on Okazaki's Hudo-Kai joint solo exhibition.
- 1979 The Photographic Society of America Journal – Article about Okazaki becoming Japan's only "Star Exhibitor" black & white print photographer; with one of his representative works. This work already showed a large near-empty space and three visual masses in one tableau: an essential feature of later Ma paintings.
- 1997–1984 Edited New Cicada, an International journal of Haiku poems. – first proposed the "haiku-Ballad Principle" during this period.
