= Fujiwara no Nobuzane =

Japanese artist

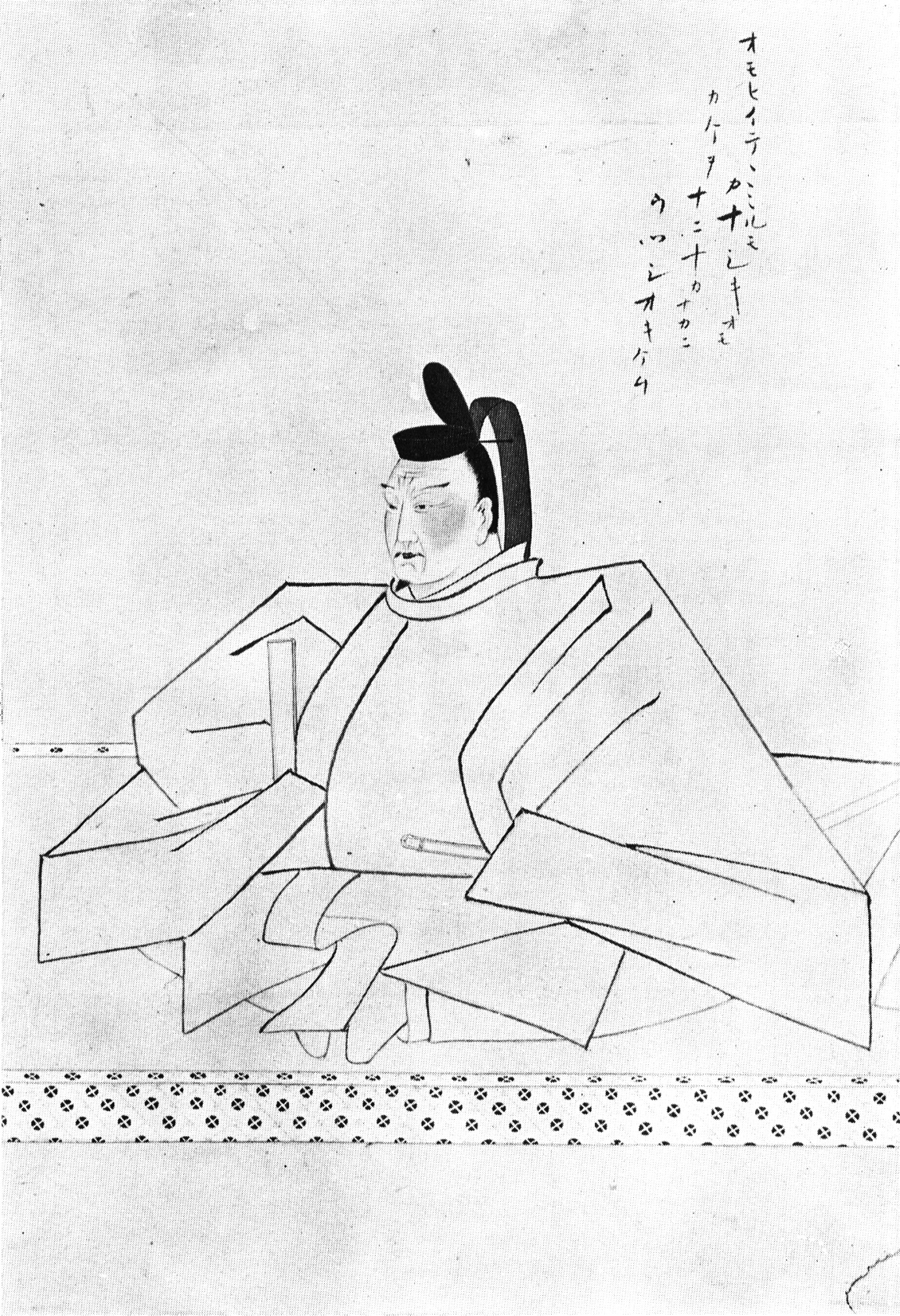
Fujiwara no Nobuzane

Fujiwara Nobuzane (Japanese: 藤原 信実) (1176–1265) was one of the leading Japanese portrait artists of 13th century Japan.

Nobuzane was born in Kyoto, and was the son of Fujiwara Takanobu. Takanobu specialized in nise-e (“likeness picture”) portraits. Of his works that have survived, the most notable is a set of the Thirty-Six Poetry Immortals. Nobuzane's son Tametsugu and grandson Tamenobu carried on the family tradition of painting.

== See also ==
- yamato-e
- Kamakura period
- Murasaki Shikibu Diary Emaki
