= Nise-e =

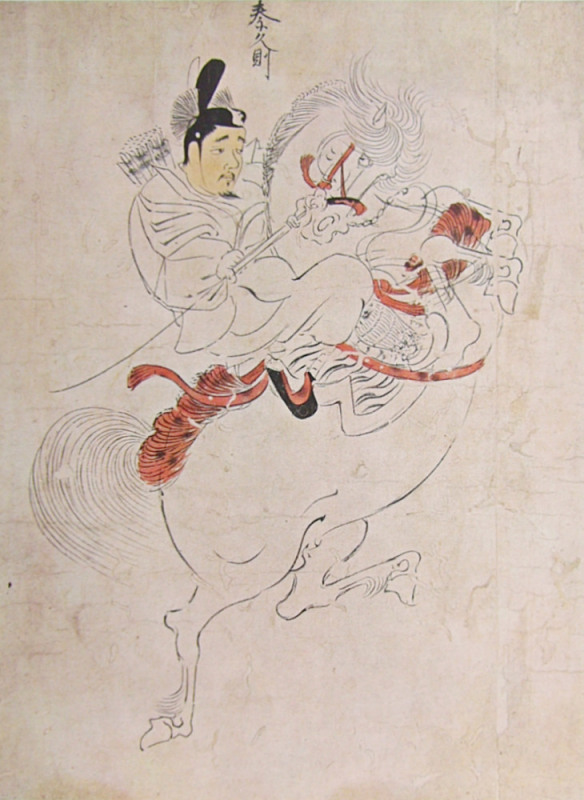
Imperial guardians handscroll detail

Nise-e (Japanese: 似絵, Hepburn: nisee, lit. 'likeness picture') were a style of portraiture popular in the court circles of Japan's Kamakura period. Prior to the 12th century Japanese art was purely religious in character, but nise-e introduced the realistic depiction of lay figures such as courtiers and samurai. The popularity of nise-e helped to end the taboo against artistic depictions of the emperor, with one of earliest nise-e to depict a living emperor being a portrait of Emperor Hanazono by Gōshin. The aim of a nise-e portrait was to capture a man's character with a few simple lines; the work served as a veneration of his accomplishments.

Fujiwara Takanobu is generally considered to have originated the nise-e style and technique. He innovated the use of jutting, angular outlines, and dense swaths of color which came to characterize nise-e portraiture as a whole. Takanobu's influence is seen in the works of his son Fujiwara Nobuzane, and descendants Tametsugu, Korenobu, Tamenobu, and Gōshin, who continued to develop the nise-e school alongside others, such as Shinkai and Tametada. Nise-e portraiture also greatly influenced the 18th century portrait style nigao-e (lit. 'likeness head'), pioneered by Katsukawa Shunshō, in response to a desire for actor portraits with realistic and expressive facial features.
