= Yoshio Fujimaki =

Japanese printmaker (1911–1935)

- 藤牧義夫
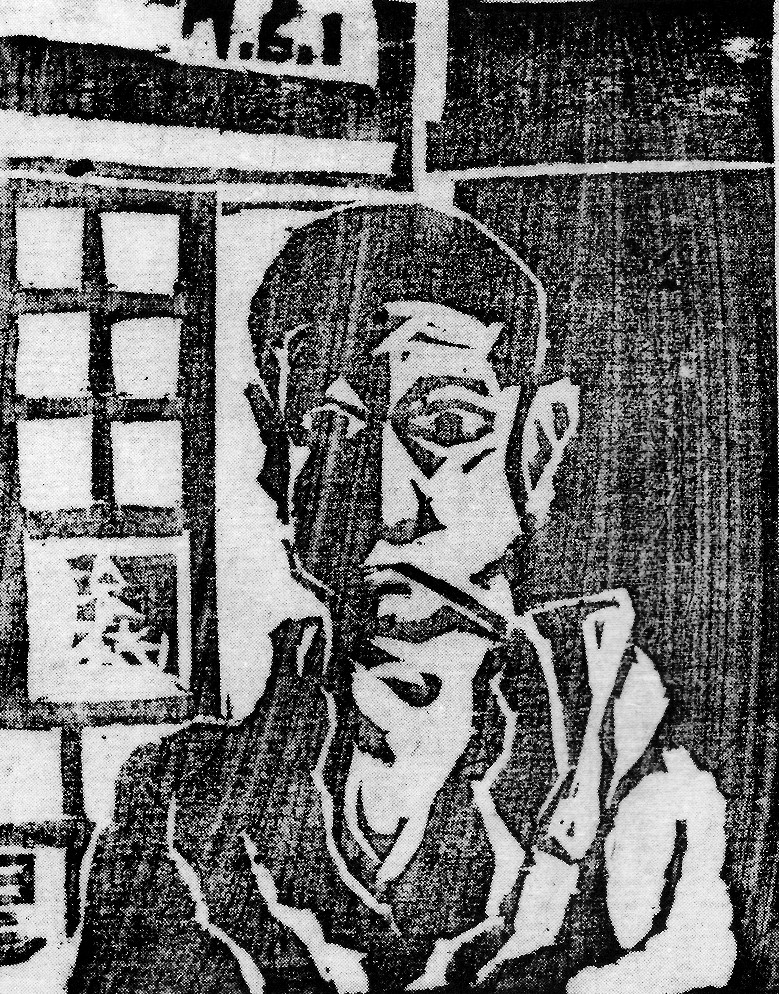
- self-portrait, 1932
- Born: January 19, 1911; Tatebayashimachi, Ōra District, Gunma, Empire of Japan (now Tatebayashi, Gunma, Japan)
- Disappeared: September 2, 1935 (aged 24); Mukojima-ku, Tokyo, Empire of Japan (now Sumida-ku, Tokyo, Japan)
- Status: Missing for 90 years, 1 month and 14 days
- Resting place: Horin-ji, Asahi-cho, Tatebayashi, Gunma, Japan

Yoshio Fujimaki (藤牧義夫, Fujimaki Yoshio) (January 19, 1911 – disappeared September 2, 1935）was a Japanese printmaker who was part of the Sōsaku-hanga movement. He focused mainly on depicting the Shitamachi area of Tokyo during the 1930s, and is known for creating a long Hakubyō scroll print focusing on areas surrounding the Sumida River. Fujimaki became an obscure figure after his disappearance at the age of 24, but a 1978 exhibition renewed interest in his work.

== Career ==
Fujimaki was born in the village of Tatebayashi, which was incorporated into the eponymous city in 1954. His family were shizoku who served the Tatebayashi Han. After the Meiji Restoration, his father worked as an educator and served for a time as principal of an elementary school; he also painted and wrote calligraphy using the art name Sangaku (Japanese: 三岳). Fujimaki's mother and father died in his childhood; when he was the age of 2 and 13 respectively. After his father's death, the family started a daily goods store at their home. A neighbor of note at the time was Tenko Fujino, who lived two houses next to them.

Fujimaki showed talent in artwork during his elementary school days and surprised those around him. After moving to Tokyo in 1927, he became a disciple to a textile artist in Nihonbashi named Sota Sasaki, and while he was studying commercial designs, he developed a unique printing style influenced by German expressionism. His most significant artwork is the Sumidagawa Emaki (Japanese: 隅田川絵巻) a 4-part scroll that totals 60 meters in length. Fujimaki disappeared in Tokyo at the age of 24. His grave is located at Horinji at Asahi-cho, Tatebayashi. He was also a Kokuchūkai member, and left behind an artwork that depicted the religious group's headquarter titled Shinkoen (Japanese: 申孝園).

== Disappearance ==
After visiting fellow printmaker Tadashige Ono's home Fujimaki disappeared. Ono told his friends that Fujimaki suffered from poverty and sank in to the Sumida River, and on the pamphlet of the 1978 exhibition, Ono wrote that he told him that he canceled his room and entrusted him with two furoshiki wrappings before leaving. Ono's statement led to suspicions that he threw himself in to the Sumida River to commit suicide.

== Family ==
- Father: Tomonoshichi Fujimaki (Japanese: 藤牧巳之七) - Worked as a principal of an elementary school for 30 years, and after retiring became a judicial scrivener for the Maebashi District Court. He had 10 children, but out of those, the only male offsprings that survived was his 2nd-born son and the last child (Yoshio) that he had when he was 54. He died from illness at the age of 67 in 1924.
- Mother: Taka (Japanese: たか) - Tomonoshichi's 2nd wife. Died when Yoshio was 2.
- Adoptive mother: Masa (Japanese: まさ) - Taka's sister. Married Tomonoshichi when Yoshio was 8.
- Elder brother: Hidetsugu (Japanese: 秀次) - 18 years senior to Yoshio. He became an employee of Jōmō Muslin, and after moving to Tokyo he studied at the Tokyo Municipal Commercial High School as well as the commercial school of Keio Gijuku, but died at the age of 33 due to tuberculosis.

== Timeline ==
- 1911 - Yoshio is born to Tomonoshichi and Taka as their fourth son at 1006 Tatebayashi-cho, Ōra District, Gunma (now Shiromachi, Tatebayashi-shi). Tomonoshichi was 52 at the time, and Taka was his 2nd wife, and her home was in front of Katai Tayama's birth home.
- 1913 - Taka passes away
- 1917 - Yoshio enrolls to Tatebayashi Ordinary Elementary School (currently the Tatebayashi First Elementary School
- 1919 - Yoshio's father remarries to Taka's sister Masa
- 1923 - Yoshio graduates from the elementary school
- 1924 - Tomonoshichi passes away in September
- 1925 - Yoshio graduates from higher elementary school
- 1926 - Yoshio self-publishes his father's biography Sangaku Zenshu Dai-1-kan (Japanese: 三岳全集第1巻)
- 1928 - Yoshio becomes employed at the Uematsu Design Studio in Ginza. His mentor Sota Sasaki (born in Hakodate in 1892) was a self-trained designer of metal accessories, and after studying with groups such as the Hakuba-kai, Sasaki was known as one of the leading artists of Tokyo at the time.
- 1931 - Exhibits Guard-shita no Spark (Japanese: ガード下のスパーク) (woodprint) at the 9th Shunyo-kai Exhibit, as well as Yakei (Japanese: 夜景) and Ukechi no Yoru (Japanese: 請地の夜) (both woodprints) at the 1st Exhibition of the Japan Print Association.
- 1932 - Attends the founding meeting of the group Shinhanga Shudan (Japanese: 新版画集団) held at Tadashige Ono's home. In their inaugural issue of their in house magazine Shinhanga, Yoshio submits his self-portrait (woodblock) titled Jigazo (Japanese: 自画像).
- 1933 - Exhibits Kyuyujo (Japanese: 給油所) (woodprint) at the 14th Teiten
- 1934 - Returns to Tatebayashi and depicts the Jonuma in emaki style. Yoshio becomes one of the member of Kokuchūkai's Seikakai, led by Chugaku Tanaka. Completes the Sumidagawa Emaki.
- 1935

April: Publishes the essay Jidai ni Ikiyo, Jidai wo Koeyo (Japanese: 時代に生きよ、時代を超えよ); and Shirahigebashi (Japanese: 白鬚橋) (Woodprint)
June: Opens a solo exhibition at the Tokyodo Art Gallery in Kanda, Tokyo
September: Disappears after visiting Ono Tadashige's home in Mukojima. He was 24 years old.

== Works ==
- 1931: Guard-shita no Spark (Japanese: ガード下のスパーク) (woodprint)
- 1931: Ukechi no Yoru (Japanese: 請地の夜) (woodprint)
- 1932: Jigazo (Japanese: 自画像) (woodblock)
- 1933: Kyuyujo (Japanese: 給油所) (woodprint, currently owned by the Tatebayashi Daiichi Shiryokan)
- 1933: Shirahigebashi (Woodprint)
- 1933: Ginko ni tsuite (Japanese: 銀行について) (multicolored woodprint; currently owned by The Miyagi Museum of Art)
- 1933: Winter of Jonuma (Japanese: 城沼の冬) (currently owned by Gunma Museum of Art, Tatebayashi)
- 1934: Red Sun (Japanese: 赤陽) (woodprint; currently owned by the National Museum of Modern Art, Tokyo)
- 1934: The Moon (Japanese: つき) (multicolored woodprint; currently owned by the Museum of Modern Art, Kamakura & Hayama)
- 1935: Sumidagawa Emaki (Japanese: 隅田川絵巻)（currently owned by the Tatebayashi Daiichi Shiryokan）

== Exhibitions ==
- June 25–27, 1935: Fujimaki Yoshio Hanga Kojinten (Japanese: 藤牧義夫版画個人展) held at the Tokyodo Art Gallery in Kanda, Tokyo
- January 1978: Fujimaki Yoshio Isaku Hangaten (Japanese: 藤牧義夫遺作版画展) held at the Kanransha in Ginza, Tokyo
- 1987: 1930-nendai no hangakatachiーTaninaka Yasunori to Fujimaki Yoshio wo chushin toshite (Japanese: 1930年代の版画家たちー谷中安規と藤牧義夫を中心として) held at the Museum of Modern Art, Kamakura & Hayama
- 1995: Seitan 85-shunen kinenーFujimaki Yoshio sono geijutsu no zenbo (Japanese: 生誕85周年記念ー藤牧義夫 その芸術の全貌) held at the Tatebayashi Daiichi Shiryokan
- 2011: Fujimaki Yoshio: Centennial of His Birth (Japanese: 生誕100年 藤牧義夫展) held at Gunma Museum of Art, Tatebayashi and Museum of Modern Art, Kamakura & Hayama

== Collections ==
Fifty-six of his works are held in the permanent collection of the National Museum of Modern Art, Tokyo, and the Art Institute of Chicago holds one of his prints in its collection.

== Documentary ==
- Bi no kyojin tachi "Fujimaki Yoshio 'Red Sun'" TV Tokyo et al., 2007
- Nichiyo Bijutsukan "Jidai ni ikiyo Jidai wo koeyo ~Hangaka Fujimaki Yoshio" NHK 2012
- Shin Bi no kyojin tachi "Attoteki hyogenryoku! Fujimaki Yoshio 'Sumidagawa Emaki' x Kaname Jun'" TV Tokyo et al., 2020

== Bibliography ==
- 藤牧義夫 生誕100年 [Centennial Anniversary of Fujimaki Yoshio] (in Japanese). Kyuryudo. 2011. ISBN 9784763011312.

== Related works ==
- Aioibashi en'u by Fujio Noguchi (June 1, 1982 Bungei Shunju) - a novel based on Fujimaki
- Fujimaki Yoshio shingi by Yoshihisa Otani (November 8, 2010 Gakugei Shoin) - A research book concerning fakes and Fujimaki's disappearance
- Kimi wa sumidagawa ni kietanoka : Fujimaki yoshio to hanga no kyojitsu by Kichie Komamura (May 12, 2011 Kodansha) - A nonfiction focusing on the mysterious circumstance surrounding Fujimaki's disappearance

== See also ==
- List of people who disappeared mysteriously: 1910–1990
