= Yuki Iiyama =

Japanese contemporary artist

- Born: 1988 (age 37–38); Kanagawa, Japan
- Education: Tokyo University of the Arts, Joshibi University of Art and Design

Yuki Iiyama (飯山 由貴, Iiyama Yuki, b. 1988) is a Japanese contemporary artist and lecturer at Tama Art University. Iiyama explores the themes of social stigma, representation and the interaction of the individual with society, through archival materials, video works, installations and community workshops.

== Education and early life ==
Iiyama was born in Kanagawa prefecture. In her early years, she was influenced by subcultural forms of art such as anime, manga, film, and other cinematic productions. Initially, she considered pursuing a career as a teacher, influenced by familial expectations. However, her focus shifted to contemporary art during her time at university, where she found new ways to express herself through different media.

Iiyama entered Joshibi University of Art and Design, earning a bachelor's degree in Oil Painting in 2011. Her experiences there, including exposure to modern art history and gender theory, played a pivotal role in her decision to become an artist. She later completed her MFA in Oil Painting at Tokyo University of the Arts in 2013, further developing her interest in installation and relational art, which continue to inform her practice.

== Career ==
=== Major Projects ===
Iiyama's work contextualizes structural issues that relate to institutions and the individual, often informed by personal experience.

==== Does the Future Sleep Here? (2024) ====
Iiyama participated in a group exhibition at National Museum of Western Art, Tokyo, with new works that responded to the Matsukata Collection which is the founding collection of the museum, gifted by Kōjirō Matsukata. The exhibition was notable for being the first time contemporary artists were featured at the museum, which typically exhibits early 20th century Western art. The exhibition questioned what the collection's role is in contemporary Japan. Iiyama's works were titled "No one, and Nothing, Can Control My Mind and Body" 2024, and "The History and Narratives of This Island and Myself/ Ourselves – Matsukata Kōjirō Collection".

On the opening day of the exhibition Iiyama and some of the participating artists staged an unannounced protest against the museum's sponsorship by Kawasaki Heavy Industries, Ltd, demanding that the company halt the import and distribution of Israeli-designed drones during the deadly Israel–Gaza war.

==== Mindscapes (2022) ====
Iiyama's work with the Wellcome Trust examined the issue of domestic violence, which was an issue that the artist also had personally experienced. In a wider global context, the issue at the center of Iiyama's work worsened during the COVID-19 pandemic—an increase was observed in violence and coercive control affecting interpersonal relationships since many people were trapped in closed quarters in their homes. The work created an anonymous interactive space where visitors could share and release distressing effects of intimate partner violence, and learn about the structural parts of the problem. The installation was featured in the Mori Art Museum's exhibition "Listen to the Sound of the Earth Turning: Our Wellbeing since the Pandemic" (June 29–November 6, 2022)

==== We Walk and Talk to Search Your True Home (2022) ====
A solo exhibition at Tokyo Metropolitan Human Rights Plaza that posed questions about the boundary between patients and non-patients in mental health disorders based on the artist's experience and co-created works with her sister who has mental health conditions, "Going to Look for Your True Home" and "Going to Meet Kannon at the Sea,". The work "Hidden Names" looked at a wider discussion around how psychiatric facilities function and how those with mental disorders are treated. A special screening of the documentary In-Mates (2021) was also to be screened but was stopped by censors due to its subject matter relating to two Korean mental health patients in pre-World War II Japan. The films were originally commissioned by the Japan Foundation.

==== 100 Living Tales ====
Video installation works concerning the "mysterious stories" collected from people living on the islands of Setouchi in the inland sea. Presented at Setouchi Triennale (2016) and Yokohama Triennale (2020)

=== Representation ===
Iiyama is represented by the gallery WAITINGROOM.

=== Public Collections ===
Aichi Prefectural Museum of Art, Aichi

Fukuoka Art Museum, Fukuoka

Her video, “Cinematic Prism” was screened at the AIT room, Daikanyama, Tokyo

== Censorship ==
In 2022, the Tokyo Metropolitan Government censored a planned screening of Iiyama's film "In-Mates" (2021) which is a documentary-style film created together with the rapper, poet and 2.5-generation "Zainichi" Korean resident FUNI, inspired by medical records of patients admitted to the Oji Brain Hospital in Tokyo, which was a psychiatric facility. The documentary looked at the records of two Korean patients admitted between 1930 and 1940 and featured themes of disability and race prior to World War II.

The censorship happened in the context of Tokyo Governor Yuriko Koike avoiding the customary commemoration of the massacre of Korean residents in Tokyo during the Great Kanto Earthquake of 1923, seen by many as historical denialism.

Iiyama's censorship joins many other cases of censorship in Japan, particularly in the field of art.
