= Terasaki Kōgyō =

Japanese painter

Terasaki Kogyo
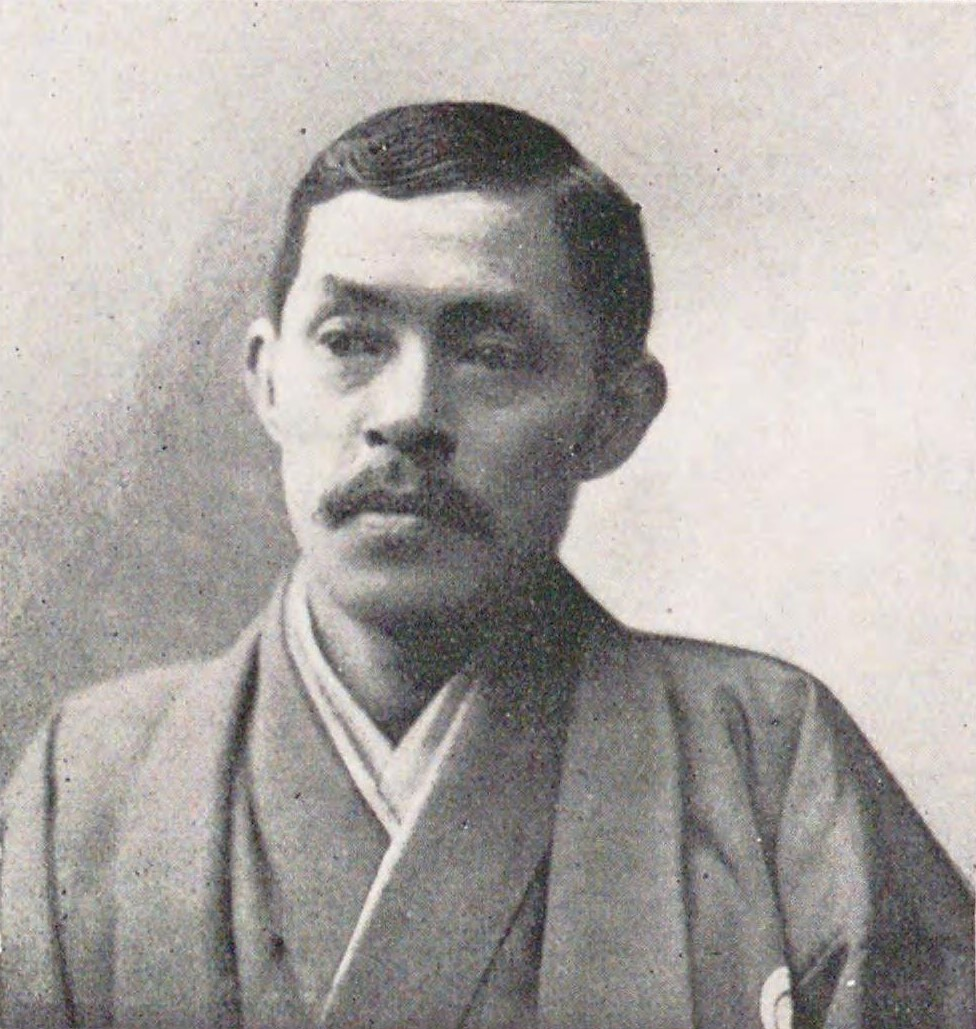
- Born: Chutaro Terasaki; 1866; Dewa Province, Japan
- Died: 1919 (aged 52–53)
- Occupation: painter
- Known for: Shijō school style
- Notable work: Bungei Kurabu

Terasaki Kōgyō or Terazaki Kōgyō (born Chutaro Terasaki or Terazaki; 1866–1919) was a Japanese painter who completed many works for the publishing house Hakubunkan and their literary magazine Bungei Kurabu.

== Biography ==
Kōgyō was born in Dewa Province. He began painting at the age of 16. In 1888, at the age of 20, Kōgyō studied under the painter Hoan (Hirafuku Suian, 1844–90) and changed to the style of the Shijō school. When the Russo-Japanese War started, he joined the Imperial Army of Japan as a painter.
