= Tets Ohnari =

Japanese artist

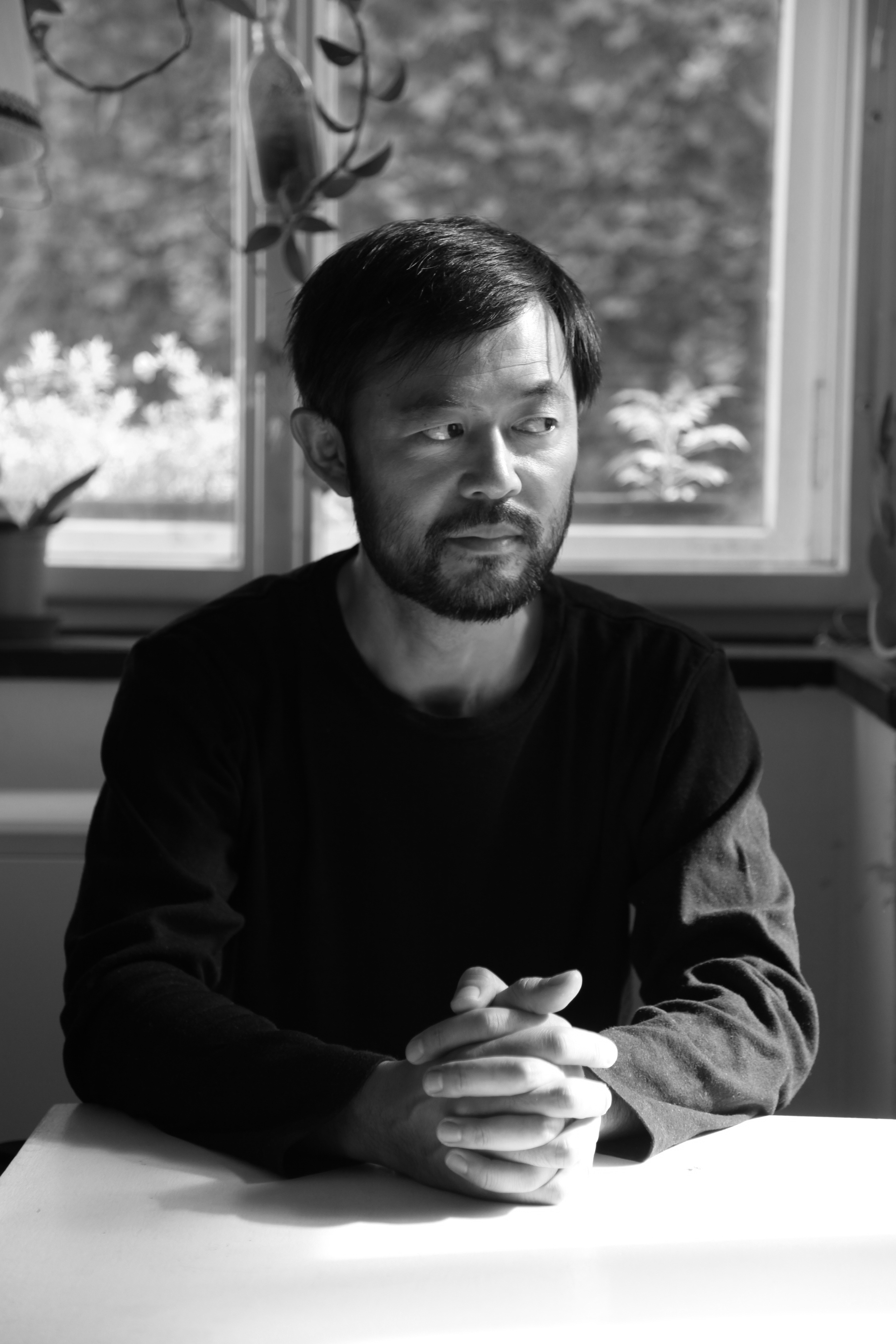
- Born: Tets Ohnari; June 30, 1980 (age 46); Tokyo, Japan
- Known for: Sculpture, Contemporary art

Tets Ohnari (大成哲, Tets Ohnari; * 30 June 1980, Tokyo) is a Japanese sculptor and contemporary artist living and working in both, Tokyo and Prague (Czech Republic).

== Life and career ==
2005–2007 Scholarship from Czech Republic Ministry of Education, Youth And Sports, Studies at Academy of Fine Arts in Prague (AVU)

2008 Master's degree of Arts, Tokyo University of the Arts (TUA)

2010 Scholarship given by Japanese government (Bunkachou) after being chosen as the only one from all artists under 32 years of age.

2022 Ph.D. Jan Evangelista Purkyně University in Ústí nad Labem, Faculty of Art and Design, Visual communication course

== Exhibitions ==
- 2013 H’art Gallery (Bucharest, Romania)
- 2014 Dai-ichi Life South Gallery (Tokyo, Japan)
- 2016 TEZUKAYAMA Gallery (Osaka, Japan)
- 2016 Jan Koniarek Gallery (Trnava, Slovakia)
- 2020 Egon Schiele Art Centrum (Cesky Krumlov, Czech Republic)

== Group exhibitions ==
- 2017 SIGNAL festival 2017 (Prague, Czech Republic)
- 2017 VOLTA13 (Basel, Switzerland)
- 2019 INVALIDOVNA (Prague, Czech Republic)

== Artist-in-residence & Sculpture Symposium ==
- 2013 Egon Schiele Art Centrum (Český Krumlov, Czech Republic)
- 2015 The 12 th International Glass Symposium (Nový Bor, Czech Republic)
- 2015 AIAV Artist-in-residence program (Yamaguchi, Japan)

== Grants and scholarships ==
- 2009 The Japan Foundation
- 2010 Pola Art Foundation
- 2011 Japanese Government Overseas Study Programme for Artists (3 years)
- 2016 Scholarship, Czech Republic Ministry of Education, Youth And Sports
- 2017 THE SATOH ARTCRAFT RESEARCH & SCHOLARSHIP FOUNDATION
