= Ohno Bakufu =

Japanese artist (1888–1976)

Ohno (Ono) Bakufu
- Born: 1888; Tokyo, Japan
- Died: 1976 (aged 87–88)
- Known for: Painting and Printing
- Notable work: "Japanese Fish Picture Collection (Japanese: Dai Nihon gyorui gashu)"

Ohno Bakufu (大野麦風; 1888–1976) was a Japanese painter and printmaker in the shin-hanga style.

He was born in Tokyo, Japan. Over his lifetime he created over seventy designs. His best known collection of work is the Great Japanese Fish Picture Collection (大日本魚類画集). Although this is his most famous piece of work, he also created many landscapes and a few still lives. After 1923 Great Kantō earthquake, he moved to Kansai. He was an honorary member of the Hyogo Prefecture Academy of Fine Arts, and a member of Taiheiyogakai.
