= Chuzo Tamotzu =

American painter

- Born: February 19, 1888; Kagoshima, Japan
- Died: May 18, 1975 (aged 87); Santa Fe, New Mexico
- Education: Senshu University
- Known for: Painting

Chuzo Tamotzu (多毛津 忠蔵, Tamotsu Chūzō; February 19, 1888 - May 18, 1975) was a self-taught painter who was born in Kagoshima, Japan, and later lived in New York City before settling in Santa Fe, New Mexico in 1948.

== Early life ==
Chuzo Tamotzu was born in the village of Toguchi on Amami Ōshima island in Kagoshima Prefecture, Japan. He was raised by his father along with his sisters and older brother. After attending middle school, Tamotzu became interested in the oriental and occidental arts, which he pursued with the help of private tutors. He was also an adept dancer, and a skilled musician playing the Shakuhachi, a Japanese flute. At Senshu University in Tokyo he was educated in political economics for two years. In 1914, he decided to leave Japan to study oriental and European arts by traveling to China, Korea, India, Borneo, France, Belgium, England, and Holland, where he got a closer look to the work of the great masters by visiting the museums.

== Career ==
Tamotzu moved to New York in 1920 to pursue his art career. While there he became a part of the art scene, befriending several other artists, such as Philip Evergood, Yasuo Kuniyoshi and John Sloan, and serving on the board of the Society of Independent Artists when Sloan became the society's president. He resided in New York for twenty one years.

Tamotzu was a self taught artist, mastering the art techniques of Japanese Sumi ink, pastel chalk, oils, and tempura. Tamotzu continued his studies and began to gain reputation. He exhibited his work in Whitney Museum of American Art, the Pennsylvania Academy of Fine Arts, The Art Institute of Chicago, the Society of Independent Artists, and The American Contemporary Artists' Gallery.

During the Great Depression, Tamotzu worked for the Public Works of Art Project in New York, but was denied participation in the Works Progress Administration because he was not an American citizen.

Tamotzu served in the American military during World War II as a combat sketch artist, and eventually became an American citizen. In 1947 Tamotzu became a founding member of the New York Artists' Equity Association.

In 1953, he organized an exchange art presentation between a gathering of New Mexico primary school kids and Hiroshima school children to promote altruism and a better understanding between these countries.

From 1950 to 1959 The Museum of New Mexico held annual exhibitions of his art.

In 1974 Tamotzu converted the studio he had been renting in Santa Fe from John Sloan into his own gallery.

Tamotzu's art is held in the collections of the Metropolitan Museum, Hirshhorn Museum and Sculpture Garden and New Mexico Museum of Art.

As a member of Artists' Equity Association, he contributed into passing a legislation for the formation of the New Mexico Arts Commission.

== Personal life ==
In 1948, Tamotzu married Louise Kates and moved to Santa Fe, New Mexico. He continued working on his art, participating in exhibitions and giving demonstrations and talks in schools. He was also a member of the Alliance for the Arts.

In 1967, he returned to Japan and visit his family, which led to the creation of sixty sketches of Japan and a number of paintings.

In 1974, his studio was converted into the Tamotzu Gallery, where he continued exhibiting his art.
