= Minako Nishiyama =

Japanese artist (born 1965)

- 西山 美なコ
- Born: 1965 (age 60–61); Hyogo, Japan

Minako Nishiyama (西山 美なコ, Nishiyama Minako; born 1965 in Hyōgo prefecture) is a Japanese contemporary artist whose works have dealt with cultures, customs, and the representations of young females in Japanese media and popular culture. Her work is identified with an initial stage of the artistic transformation of post-modern Japanese "cute culture" in which cute images were appropriated and used for critique.

Nationally she has had many solo shows in Okayama, Tokyo, Kyoto, Osaka, Fukuoka, and Nishinomiya. In addition to a solo show at the Galerie Ghislaine Hussenot in Paris, France she has participated internationally in group shows in Beijing, China; Madrid, Spain; Rimini, Italy and Portland, Oregon, Minneapolis and Miami in the United States.

Since the beginning of the 1990s she has been making sculptures, paintings and installations using a transient material such as sugar with a bright luscious pink red to pink color that evaporate and dissolve over time. Her used of sugar and bright pink color refer to the stereotypical representations or images of cuteness or kawaii of young Japanese female. In 2015 her work was included in the group exhibition "Kawaii" at the University for the Creative Arts in Farnham, England.

== Education ==
Nishiyama Minako works and lives in Hyogo prefecture. She earned a degree in the sculpture major from the Graduate School of Art, Kyoto City University of Arts in 1991. She teaches courses at Kyoto Seika University.
