= Eijiro Miyama =

Japanese outsider artist (1934–2024)

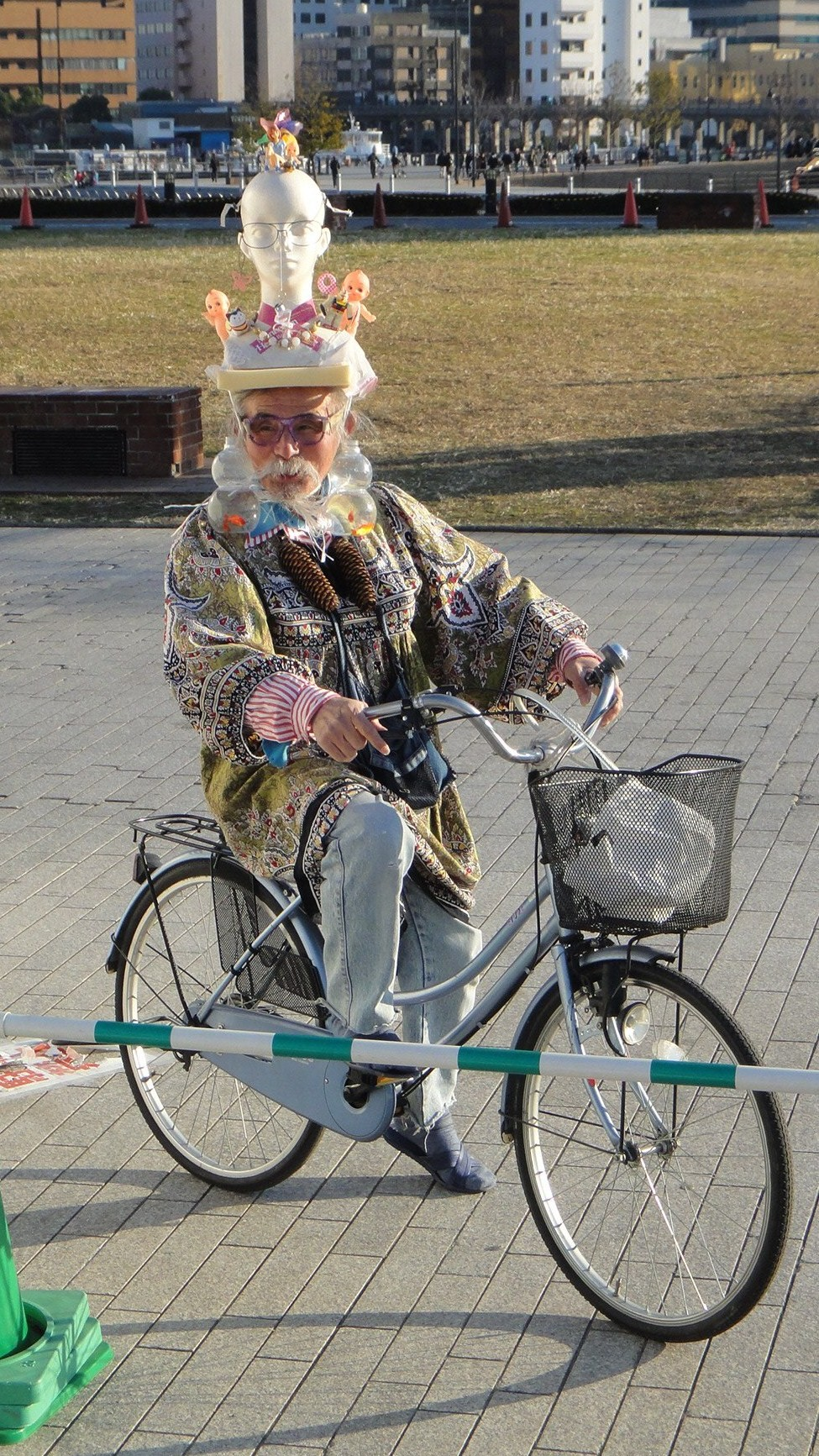
- Eijiro Miyama in Yokohama, January 2011
- Born: Miyama Eijirō; 1934
- Died: June 13, 2024 (aged 89–90)
- Known for: Outsider art

Eijiro Miyama (宮間 英次郎, Miyama Eijirō; 1934 – June 13, 2024) was a Japanese outsider artist who lived in Kanagawa Prefecture. He was often referred to as Bōshi Ojisan (帽子おじさん; "Hat Man") due to his habit of riding his bicycle around the streets of Yokohama wearing eccentric clothing and large, elaborate hats or headgear adorned with dolls and other recycled objects. Miyama died on June 13, 2024.

== Exhibitions ==
- "快走老人録－老いてますます過激になる－" at Borderless Art Museum No-Ma in Ōmihachiman, Shiga (16 September – 15 November 2006)
- Collection de l'art brut in Lausanne, Switzerland (22 February – 28 September 2008)
- Art Brut from Japan in Vienna, Austria (16 July – 18 October 2009)
