= Gensou Okuda =

Japanese painter (1912–2003)

Okuda Genso (奥田元宋) (6 July 1912 – 15 February 2003) was one of the most famous Nihonga painters of the Showa era. He gave his name to a red pigment "Genso red".

== Biography ==
Okuda was born in Hiroshima prefecture, in what is now Miyoshi City. His original name used the characters 厳三. He studied with Kodama Kibō beginning in 1925, and exhibited at Shin Bunten beginning in 1936.

== Timeline ==
1912	Okuda Gensou was born in Hiroshima Prefecture.
1925	He became the pupil of Kodama Kibo.
1933	He escaped from Kodama Kibo.
1935	He was forgiven for becoming the pupil of Kodama Kibo again.
1936	He exhibited "Sannin No Josei (three women)" at the "Bunten" exhibition.
1964	He exhibited "Wakaba No Koro" at the "Nitten" exhibition.
1963	He was awarded the Japan Art Academy prize.
1973	He was appointed to the member of the Japan Art Academy.
1974	He took office to the managing director of the "Nitten".
1977	He took office to the chief director of the "Nitten".
1981	He was selected to the Person of Cultural Merits.
1984	He was given the Order of Culture.
1996	He completed the mural of the "Ginkaku-ji (Jisho-ji temple)" in Kyoto.
2003	He died at 90 years old.

== Famous works ==
- Matsushima Twilight 松島暮色, 1 panel, 77.6 x 167.1 cm (1976)
- Lakeshore Spring Glittering 湖畔春耀, 1 panel, 89.0 x 105.6 cm (1986)
