= Matsutani =

Matsutani (written: 松谷 lit. "pine tree valley") is a Japanese surname. Notable people with the surname include:

- Hiroaki Matsutani (fl. 1990s), Japanese mixed martial artist
- Makoto Matsutani (松谷 誠, 1903–1998), Japanese military officer
- Takesada Matsutani (松谷 武判, born 1937), Japanese mixed-media artist
- Yūya Matsutani (松谷 裕也, born 1984), ring name Shōhōzan Yūya, Japanese sumo wrestler

== Fictional characters ==
- Yoko Matsutani, from the 2000s Japanese Legendz franchise
