= Shuzo Matsutani =

Shuzo Matsutani may refer to one of two fictional characters:

- The main character of the Legendz anime, Shuzo "Shu" Matsutani (シュウゾウ・マツタニ Shūzō Matsutani). See: List of Legendz characters
- Shuzo "Shu" Matsutani (松谷 修造 Matsutani Shūzō), the main character of Now and Then, Here and There
