= Varnay =

Varnay may refer to:

== People ==
- Astrid Varnay (1918–2006), a Swedish-born American dramatic soprano of Hungarian descent
- Theodora Varnay (born 1942), better known under her married name of Theodora Varnay Jones, a Hungarian-born American artist
