= Yuko Nasaka =

Japanese avant-garde artist (born 1938)

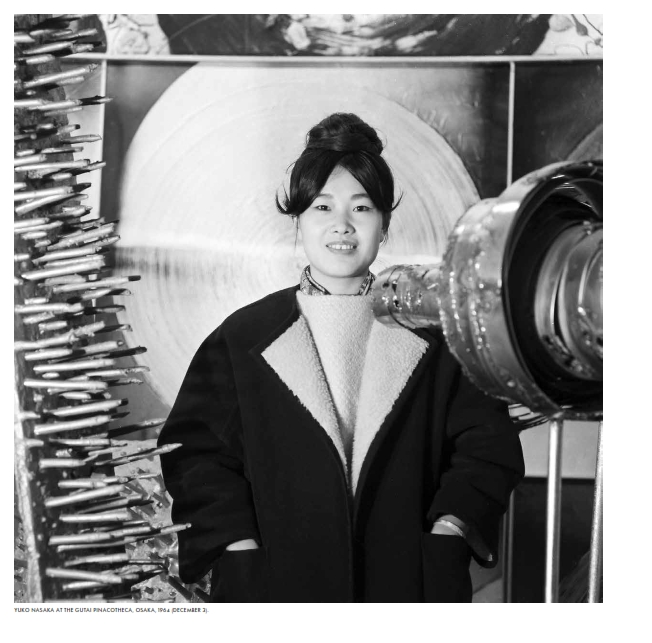
Portrait of Yuko Nasaka

Yuko Nasaka (名坂有子, Nasako Yuko, born 1938) is a Japanese avant-garde artist who is known for her involvement with the Gutai Art Association.

== Early life and education: 1938–53 ==
Yuko Nasaka was born in Konohana-ku, Osaka, Japan in 1938. Nasaka was the second daughter to parents, Yogashige Takeda and Matsue Takeda, who had six children. Nasaka started to paint at the age of three. Her teacher hung one of her first pictures on the glass walls inside the school, which was of "a self-righting doll made out of celluloid". When Nasaka was six years old, her family moved to Takarazuka in Hyōgo Prefecture. She began oil painting in her early teens while she attended Osaka Municipal Utashima Junior High School. In 1953, Nasaka entered Osaka Prefectural Ichioka High School, and was invested in the school's art club—Kaoide Group. The school emphasized the visual arts, and bore alumni such as noted Japanese painter Narashige Koide. Additionally, another artist associated with the school is Senkichiro Nasaka—Yuko's eventual spouse, who was once a teacher at Osaka Prefectural Ichioka High School.

== Early work: 1956–59 ==
Nasaka matriculated at Osaka Shoin Women's University in 1956. While at university, she enrolled in the two-year "Daily Life" course—a home economics course that focused on hygiene, domestic efficacy, and soap making. Nasaka aspired to attend an art university, but was held back because of a failing medical exam. She had a problem with her lymph sacs, but was quickly cured after undergoing treatment. Because the "Daily Life" course did not have a visual art focus, Nasaka joined an art club run by Sho Matsui, who was connected to the Nika-kai (Second Section) association, a group made up of fauvist style painters who were associated with the Ministry of Education's academic salon. During University, Nasaka dedicated her time to this club, and through this platform she submitted paintings to the Nika exhibition in Osaka. Three years later, Nasaka graduated from University and married Senkichiro Nasaka. After graduating from Osaka Shoin Women's University in 1959 and marrying Senkichiro, the young family moved to Ibaraki City, Osaka, where their first daughter was born.

Naska's early body of work was inspired by an iceman who brought blocks of ice to her home in the summertime when she was young. She was "interested in the shape that was created when he first broke through the blocks with his icepick". She started off by using big cardboard boxes to make her art. Eventually, Nasaka shifted from using cardboard to metal, and went to a foundry to cast her artwork. Her overall process involved spreading out sand-like soil, making holes in it, and then pouring them in metal. She chose these materials specifically because they allowed her to concretely realize her ideas. By this time in her career, she had gravitated away from painting because she felt disconnected to this medium, and instead turned her body of work into "unrealistic, almost abstract shapes".

== Involvement with the Gutai group ==
Around 1962, Kazuo Shiraga, Senkichiro's classmate at the Kyoto City Specialist School of Painting, now known as Kyoto City University of Arts, and an eventual member of the avant-garde Gutai group, inspired Nasaka to submit her art to the 15th Ashiya City Exhibition in 1962. Simultaneously, the exhibition also commemorated the opening of the Gutai Pinacotheca. Ashiya City is where the Gutai group held their first groundbreaking show: "Experimental Outdoor Modern Art Exhibition to challenge the Midsummer Burning Sun". Nasaka eventually won the Ashiya Mayor's Prize, and showed her work at the Ashiya City Exhibition two more times. Shortly after Nasaka submitted her works to the exhibition, Nasaka met Jiro Yoshihara, the co-founder and leader of the Gutai group.

Nasaka was first involved with the Gutai group in 1962 at the Gutai Pinacotheca, which is an exhibition space in Nakanoshima, Osaka. Gutai artists have regularly exhibited their work in this space. Eventually, Nasaka became officially admitted to Gutai in 1963, alongside Takesada Matsutani. Jiro Yoshihara vouched for Nasaka to other Gutai members to join.

Nasaka said about her Gutai initiation:

Everyone fell silent, but he (Yoshihara) repeated his question three times and everyone clapped their hands. At first there wasn't a sound.

Nasaka was admitted as a Phase Two Gutai artist (19562-1972). While Phase One, Gutai artists (1954–62) focused on responding to the postwar period in Japan, and engaging with direct materials to critique wartime militarism. Alternatively, Phase Two Gutai artists were more solicitous about Japan's burgeoning economic and technological growth. The Phase Two artists employed materials and techniques including advanced technology that were germane to the theme of industrialism. Nasaka gained sizable recognition after winning the Ashiya Mayor's Prize in 1962. In 1964, Nasaka put on a solo show at the Gutai Pinacotheca, in which she expanded her work to a larger school by completely covering an entire wall with a grid of proliferating concentric circles. Nasaka was featured in the April 1965 Issue of Art International, was asked to be a judge for the Ibaraki exhibition, and showed her work in the Female Artists' Association exhibition. Nasaka went on a hiatus and did not create art for two decades. However, in the 2000s she began creating artwork again, and held solo exhibitions in 2014 in Tokyo, and in 2015 in Antwerp, Belgium.

== Overview of work ==
Nasaka's later body of work featured concentric circles manifested through reliefs. She grounded her practices through technological experimentation and used innovative industrial materials for her time. Nasaka's process involved the use of a rotating plate, a tool that was handmade for her. The tool resembles an electric pottery wheel combined with a turntable. She then used resin cement to create circular patterns, and then airbrushes the circles with resin and lacquer. No panel is the same, as each piece denotes a different sphere, color or texture. Ultimately, Nasaka places each panel side by side, and fits them into a grid like formation, expanding the grid so fully that it covers an entire wall akin to that of a mural. The expansion of concentric circles creates an effect of infinite space. Nasaka achieves the effect of four-dimensional space through her concentric circle constructions of varying heights, layering, depths, and textures. Her methods of using non-art materials adhere to Gutai's ethos of experimenting with technologically advanced materials and techniques.

=== Work shown at the Solomon R. Guggenheim Museum ===
In 2013, Nasaka's piece Work (1960) was featured in the Solomon R. Guggenheim Museum's exhibit: Gutai: Splendid Playground. Work (1960) is from Nasaka's concentric circle series, and exemplifies Naska's concern for the relationship between industrialization and humanity. She juxtaposed these ironic notions together to question the direction of humanity, particularly given the circumstances of burgeoning industry and technology.

Nasaka used square wooden panels for the bases, and then coated them with a material that is composed of plaster, glue and clay. While malleable, Nasaka treated the surface with the turntable tool—which resulted in the centrifugal compositions. Nasaka carved delicate patterns onto the surface and then sprayed car lacquer as the final touch. From a distance, the amalgamated panels resemble sonographic screens of photographs of the Moon's surface. Yet, when examined closely, one can see Nasaka's touch. Her intricate carvings demonstrate a sense of unpredictability and betray the illusion of machine-like perfection from afar.
