= Don Soker Contemporary Art =

Don Soker Contemporary Art is a San Francisco-based art gallery, established in 1971. It is one of the longest continuously operating contemporary art galleries in the San Francisco Bay Area. The gallery exhibits contemporary international art with an emphasis on conceptual, reductive and minimal work in a variety of media. It was one of the first to show contemporary Japanese art in the 1970s. As of 2017, the gallery is located in San Francisco's Potrero Hill district.

== History ==
The gallery was founded in 1971 by Don and Carol Kaseman Soker as the "Upstairs Gallery" in a Victorian-era flat in San Francisco's North Beach. Working with the Kyoto-based art venue Gallery Coco and later directly with artists, the early shows' focus was on contemporary Japanese conceptual art, which was little known in the United States at the time. These artists included the new conceptual group, as well as Mono-ha and Gutai artists. Their aesthetic was an experimental hybrid of past and present. Works on paper, particularly printmaking, the dominant medium and easiest to export, predominated. Among the artists were Tetsuya Noda, Ay-O, Shoichi Ida, Akira Kurosaki, Nobuo Sekine, Lee U-Fan, Ushio Shinohara, Masuo Ikeda and Takesada Matsutani.

In 1978, the gallery took the name of the owners, Soker-Kaseman Gallery. Later in that decade, the gallery began to exhibit prominent local and international artists including Bruce and Norman Yonemoto, Michi Itami, Yoong Bae, Stanley William Hayter, Paul Wunderlich, Jorg Schmeisser, Peter Van Riper, Jeffrey Vallance, Mary Woronov, Mike Kelley, Ronald Chase, Karolyi Zsigmond and Geza Samu.

From 1982 to 1986, the gallery developed and operated an alternative exhibition/performance space in the basement. As the entrance was on the small alley behind the building Bannam Place, it was called Bannam Place Exhibition Space. It was modeled on what became New Langton Arts, initially run by the San Francisco Art Dealer's Association of which Don Soker was a founder. The original curator, Rolando Castellon, had just left his post at SFMOMA. More than 80 exhibitions and numerous readings and performances were held there by SFAI students, artists from Japan who frequently lived there, North Beach artists. Bannam Place artists included Koichi Tamano, Mark Bulwinkle, Takehisa Kosugi, Corwin Clairmont, Ray Beldner, DeWitt Cheng, Mark Van Proyen, Bob Kaufman, Howard Hart, Stan Rice, Julia Vinograd, and Jack Meuller.

The gallery moved to a new location at 871 Folsom Street in 1987 and changed to its present name. The earthquake of 1989 damaged the building and the gallery and fellow tenants 871 Fine Arts and Crown Point Press moved to other locations. Subsequent locations of the gallery were 251 Post Street from 1990-1998, 49 Geary Street from 1998-2009, 100 Montgomery Street/80 Sutter Street until 2015, and, currently, 2180 Bryant Street.

In 2015, the gallery moved to the Potrero Hill/Dogpatch Area of San Francisco. The gallery has held over 300 exhibitions at its various locations. The gallery continues to represent established and emerging artists in an annual series of six 6 week exhibitions. Current artists include Elisabeth Ajtay, Julie Alland, Peter Boyer, Christel Dillbohner, Theodora Varnay Jones, Carole Jeung, Veronika Dobers, Kristie Hansen, Gordon Senior, Eleanor Wood, Susanne Schossig, and Dimitra Skandali.

== Controversy ==
In June 2019, eponymous gallery owner Don Soker made international headlines when a video went viral showing him pouring water on a homeless woman and her belongings from the roof of the building that houses the gallery.

== Notes ==
"40th Anniversary Exhibition" The San Francisco Chronicle, June 30-July 3, 2011
