= Yoong Bae =

American painter (1928 - 1992)

- Hangul: 배융
- Hanja: 裵隆
- RR: Bae Yung
- MR: Pae Yung

Yoong Bae (November 19, 1928 – November 14, 1992) was a Korean American painter and sculptor.

He was born in Seoul, Korea on November 19, 1928. He first visited the United States as a member of the Ford Foundation's Young Artist Program in 1963. He emigrated from South Korea in 1974.

== Career ==
Bae's solo exhibition "Works on Paper" was held at Soker-Kaseman Gallery in San Francisco in 1983. A posthumous solo exhibition was held at Jean Art Gallery in Seoul, South Korea in 2008.

His art explored themes related to Asian philosophy and spirituality, particularly Confucian and Zen ideas. His Dansaekhwa style of works were among those exhibited in a retrospective exhibition at the Asian Art Museum of San Francisco in 1996–1997.

Bae also created six arts & crafts books, Paper Rockets, Paper Robots, Paper Alien Starships, Paper Pinwheels, Paper Starships, and Paper UFOs.

== Personal life ==
Bae lived in Oakland, California with his wife, Kyong-Hee Bae, with whom he had three children. Bae died on November 14, 1992, of colon cancer.
