= Seiko Kanno =

- Born: 1933; Sendai, Japan
- Died: 1988 (aged 54–55)
- Movement: Gutai Group

Seiko Kanno (菅野 聖子; née Seiko Aizawa, 1933–1988) is a participant of the 'third generation' of the Gutai Art Association from the mid 1960s onward. Her paintings are often characterized by an inorganic composition, seemingly devoid of emotional expression. Kanno is also a member of an experimental, avant-garde group of poets, in which she composed highly visual poems using symbols and katakana syllables. Her work additionally suggests her admiration of music, physics and mathematics, to which she became devoted towards in her later years.

== Biography ==
Seiko Kanno was born in Sendai, Japan in 1933. She began painting and composing poems in high school. Kanno graduated from the Faculty of Human Development and Culture at Fukushima University where she often entered her abstract paintings into publicly sponsored exhibitions. Kanno began working with collage upon moving to Kobe, using newspaper and cardboard. Starting in 1964, she began showing her work to Gutai Art exhibitions, becoming an official member in 1968. She returned to painting in the late 60's. In 1965, Kanno moved to Tokyo along with her husband who had been transferred there for work. In Tokyo, she joined an art study group, led by poet Seiichi Niikuni, where she composed semiotic poems and began to introduce geometrical patterns in her paintings, calling these works Kigō shi (code poetry).

In later years, Kanno audited university classes in physics and mathematics at Kyoto University, Kwansei Gakuin University, and elsewhere. Much of her later works specifically draw inspiration from these subjects.

== Selected exhibitions ==
=== Solo ===
1997	Ashiya City Museum of Art & History
2003	ARTCOURT Gallery, Osaka
2013	Miyagi Museum of Art, Sendai

=== Group ===
1966	15th Gutai Art Exhibition, guati Pinacotheca
1970	5th Japan Art Festival, Solomon r. guggenheim Museum, New York
1992-1993	Gutai I, II, III, ashiya City Museum of art & history
2004	The 50th Anniversary of Gutai Retrospective Exhibition, hyōgo Prefectural Museum of art, Kobe
2012	Gutai: The Spirit of an Era, The National art Center, Tokyo

== Writings ==
Seiko Kanno published an anthology titled Mr. SU in 1971, through the National Museum of Art, Osaka.
