= Minoru Yoshida =

Japanese painter, sculptor, and performance artist

- Born: 1935; Osaka
- Died: 2010
- Education: Kyoto City University of Fine Arts
- Known for: Painting, Sculpture, & Performance Art
- Movement: Gutai Art Association

Minoru Yoshida (1935–2010) was a Japanese painter, sculptor, and performance artist, associated with the Gutai Art Association.

== Early life and education ==
Yoshida attended a high school which specialized in science before studying painting at Kyoto City University of Fine Arts.

He briefly ran a kimono-dyeing shop before beginning his professional career as an artist.

== Work ==
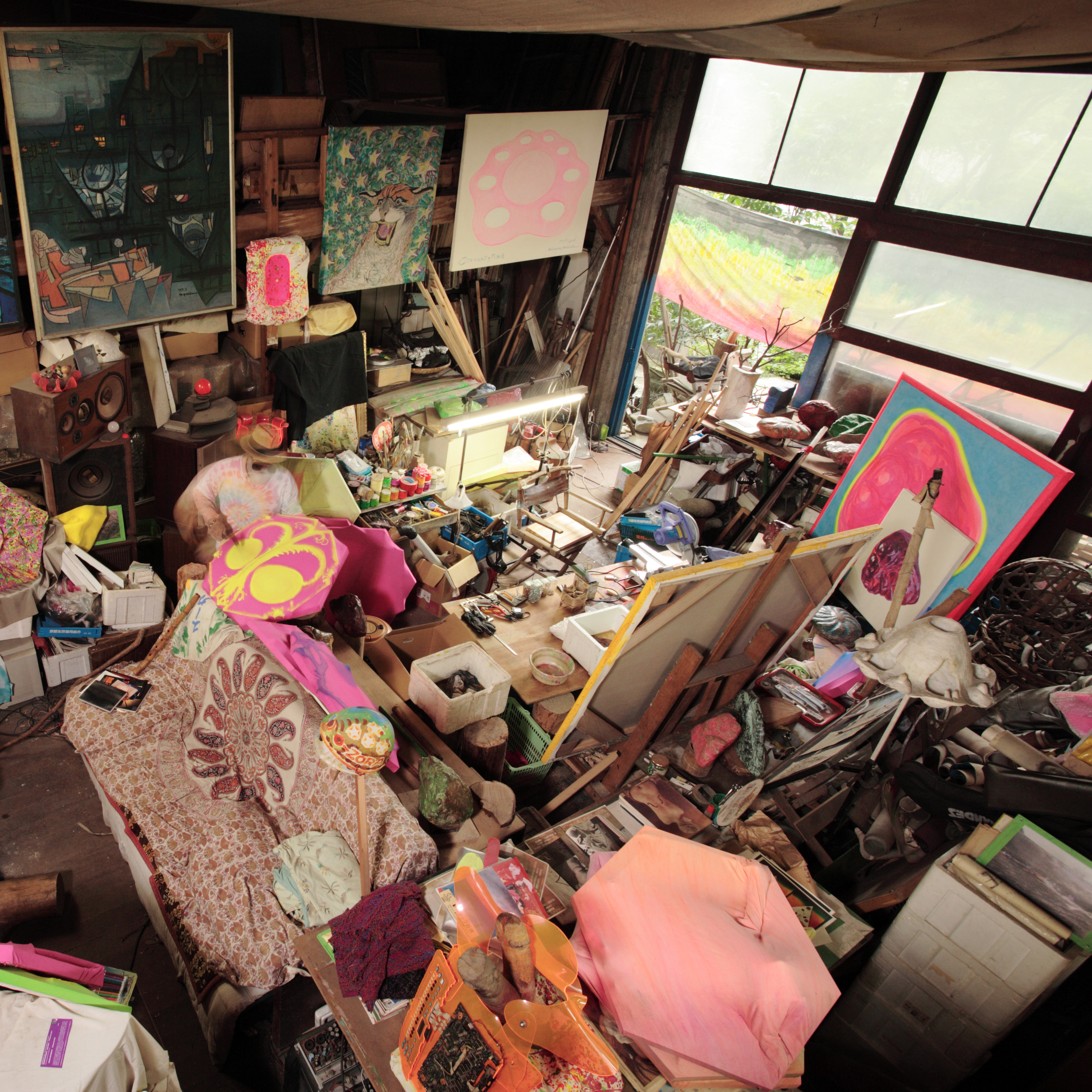
京都九条山 ヨシダ ミノル アトリエ

Yoshida is a second-generation Gutai artist, noted in the 1960s for his hard edge abstract paintings and futuristic sculptures before shifting the focus of his work to the performance format in the 1970s. In 1965 he joined the Gutai movement. Yoshida began incorporating performance art into his practice while living in New York City. His performances often incorporated a "synthesizer jacket," a garment the artist created from plexiglass and adorned with circuits and resembling his earlier sculptures. The artist also wired speakers into panels that were worn around the wearer’s thighs. By operating the different switches on the jacket, sculptural garment emitted a series of different rhythmic electronic sounds. Yoshida lived in New York City from 1970 to 1978 before returning to Japan where he continued to work and perform until his death in 2010.

=== Notable exhibitions ===
He was included in the 15th, 16th, 17th, 19th, 20th, and 21st Gutai Art Exhibitions at the Gutai Pinacotheca. His piece Bisexual Flower was included in the Osaka World Expo 1970. In 2013, Yoshida was included in Gutai: Splendid Playground exhibition at the Guggenheim Museum.

=== Public collections ===
Yoshida's works can be found in the collections of Ashiya City Museum of Art and History, Hyogo, Japan; Ohara Museum of Art, Okayama, Japan; Takamatsu Municipal Museum, Kagawa, Japan; Niigata Prefectural Museum of Modern Art, Niigata, Japan; and National Museum of Modern Art, Kyoto, Japan.
