= Sadaharu Horio =

Japanese visual and performance artist (1939–2018)

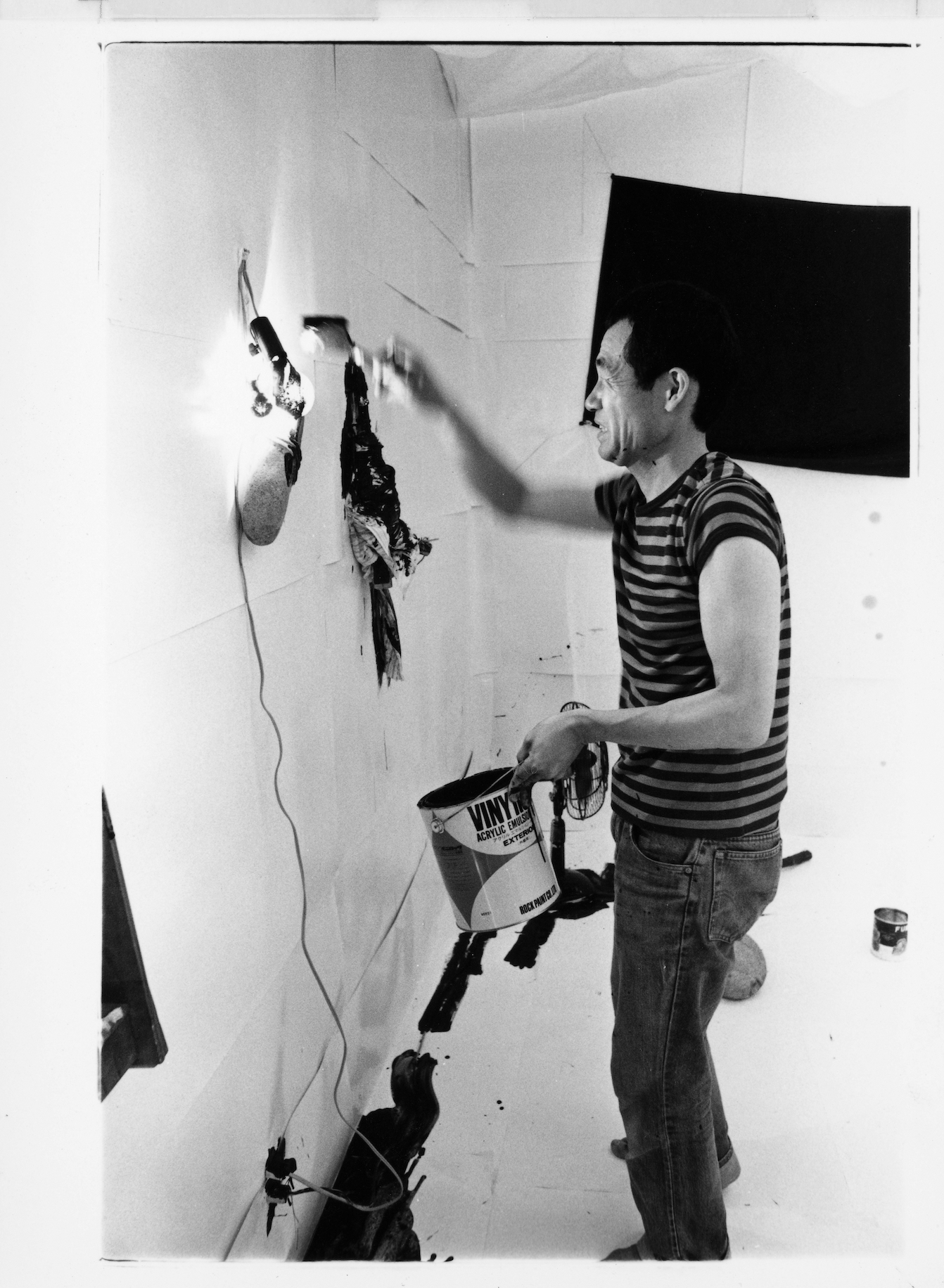
Sadaharu Horio in 1983.

Sadaharu Horio (堀尾貞治, Horio Sadaharu, born April 5, 1939, in Kobe, died November 3, 2018, in Kobe) was a Japanese visual and performance artist. From 1966 to 1972 he was a member of the Gutai Art Association and produced sculptural canvasses. From the late 1960s on, his work increasingly included large-scale installation artworks, performances and interventions in urban and natural environments. His performances often spontaneously involved the audience in collective creative activities. Horio became a crucial figure in the formation of an alternative and open art scene in the Kansai region. His work is characterized by a strong connection between the act of painting and everyday life, his repudiation of distinction between high and low art, and the ease and humor with which he adapted his performances and installations to changing sites and cultural contexts, making them accessible and open for different audiences.

== Biography ==
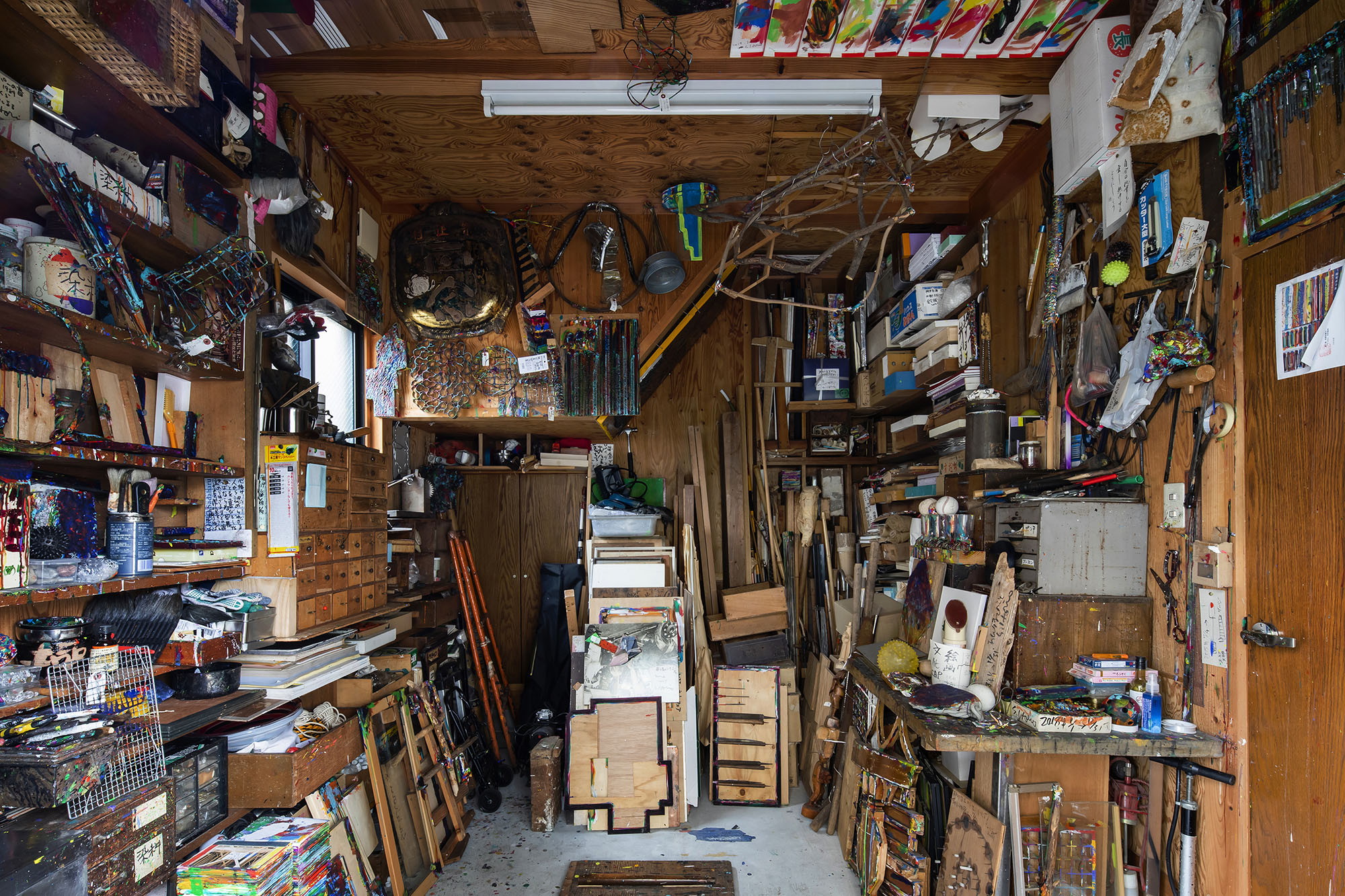
Atelier

Sadaharu Horio was born in 1939 in Kobe, Japan. His father worked as a cameraman for the military and later for a newspaper. Although he showed interest and talent in painting in his youth, in 1955 Horio began training in the Kobe shipyard of Mitsubishi Heavy Industries. He worked for the company until his retirement in 1998. In 1956, Horio first caught the attention of the Gutai group’s leader Jirō Yoshihara. In 1965, he participated in the 15th Gutai Art Exhibition at the Gutai Pinacotheca in Osaka, but shortly after, had a crisis and destroyed all his works with the intention of quitting painting. Horio continued, encouraged by Kazuo Shiraga and Saburo Murakami, and became an official member of Gutai in 1966, holding a solo show at Gutai Pinacotheca in 1968. In 1969, he became a member of the Ashiya City Art Association. He participated in Gutai projects until its dissolution in 1972.

After the dissolution of Gutai in 1972, Horio explored alternative exhibition sites in the Kansai region, took up performative and processual approaches as well as interventions in urban and natural environments, often working in close collaboration with other artists. He initiated the artist group Bonkura in 1975 and opened the experimental art venue Higashimon Gallery in Kobe in 1979. From the late 1990s onward, his works were increasingly appreciated and presented in Europe and Northern America, but Horio continued to exhibit in numerous solo and group exhibitions around the Kansai region and to dedicate his attention to local art initiatives, including performances and workshops with children. Beginning in the early 2000s he collaborated with the On-Site Art Squad KUKI (Japanese: 現場芸術集団「空気」) and made performances in the context of exhibitions such as the Yokohama Triennale 2005, Explosion! Painting as Action at Moderna Museet in Stockholm (2012) and Gutai: Splendid Playground at the Guggenheim Museum in New York (2013).

== Personal life ==
Horio was married to the Japanese artist Akiko Horio (née Kimura), a fellow Gutai member. They have two children. Horio’s uncle Mikio Horio was a supporter and collector of Mingei (folk art) and is known for having encouraged and inspired his nephew to pursue artistic projects.

== Work ==
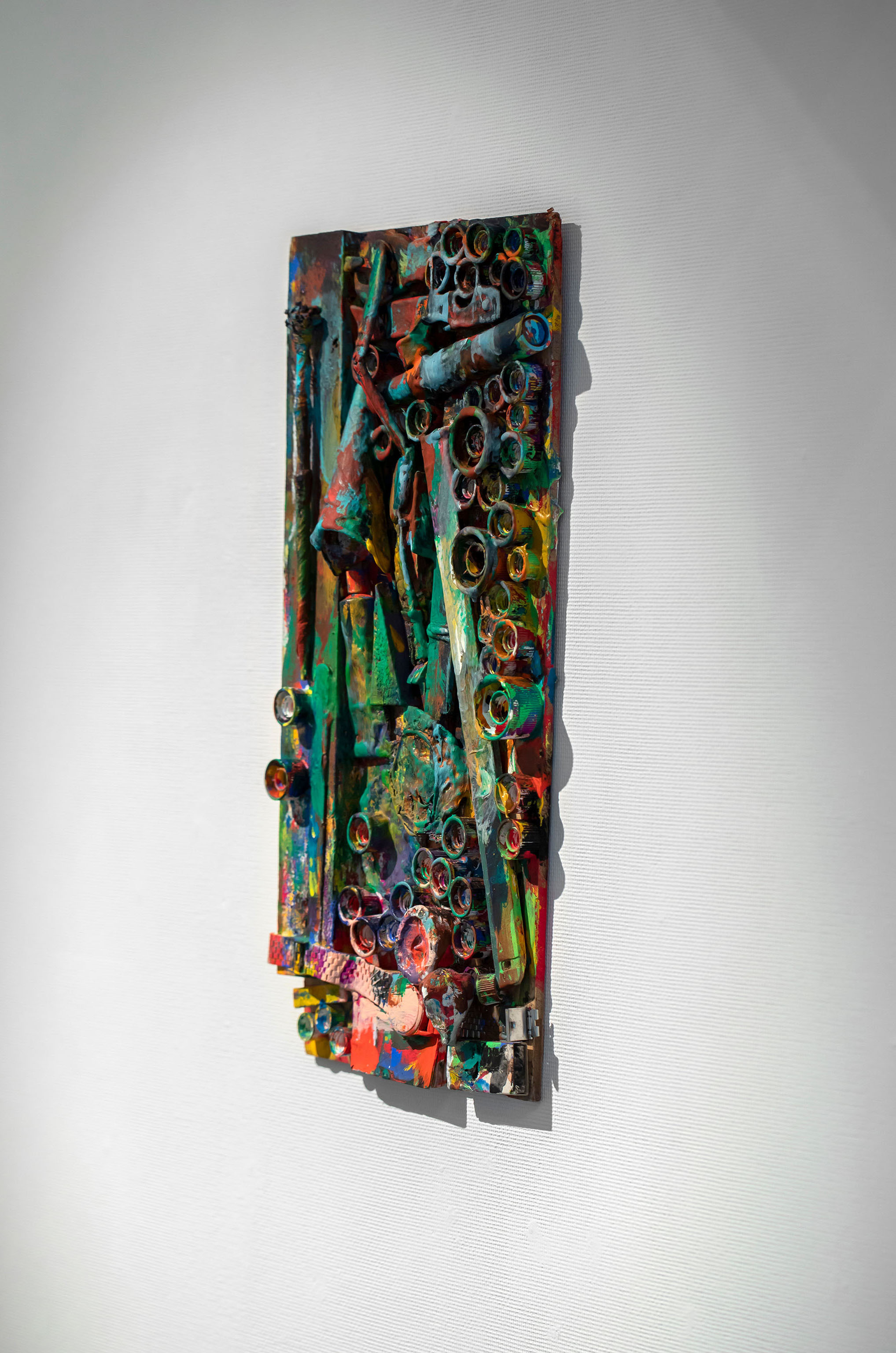
Ordinary things "Ironuri" 2018

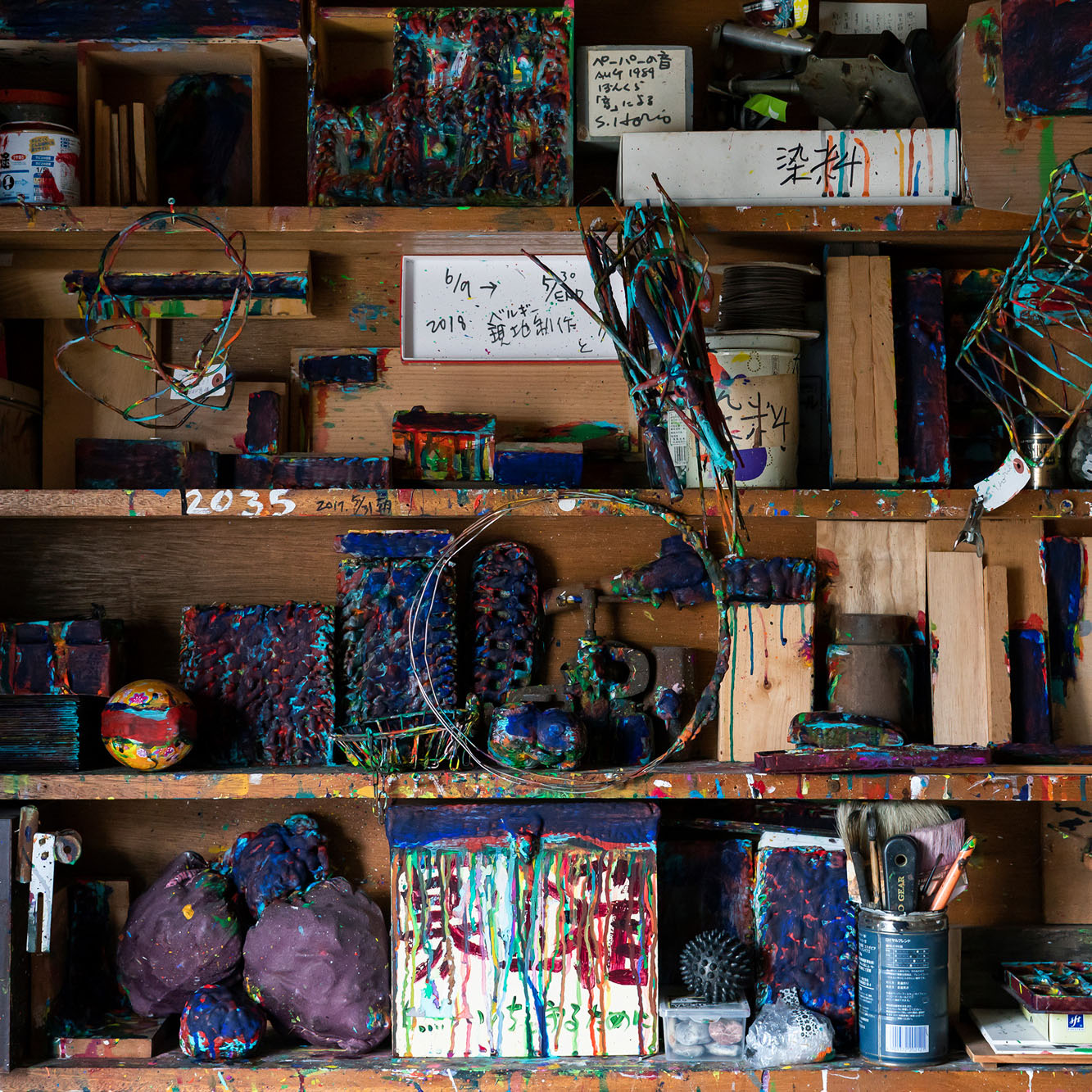
Ironuri works in progress, the color was blue on the day he died.

As a member of Gutai, Horio produced sculptural canvasses with colorfully painted fabrics arranged and attached in different shapes. After Gutai’s dissolution in 1972, Horio increasingly developed more experimental processual approaches that included performances, installation artworks and interventions into urban and natural environment. The act of applying paint continued to play a central role in these works, yet Horio used speed and spontaneity to spur his creative process. In the mid-1980s, Horio began applying paint on objects with one color each day, a method he called “ironuri” (paint placement), which resulted in the substantial alteration of the shapes of the original objects. In 1997 he developed his “ippun dahō” (one-minute hitting method) of making multiple drawings or paintings in a row within a few minutes, a process which he continued to explore in his performances as well. Then in 2002, in reference to the Gutai Card Box (1962), Horio began making ¥100-Yen Paintings, where exhibition visitors could buy drawings at a booth that resembled a vending machine for the equivalent of about 1 Euro, in which Horio or his collaborators hid and spontaneously drew. As part of his solo show at the Ashiya City Museum of Art & History in 2002, Horio created a series of performances for every one of the 38 days. In his performances and workshops Horio involved the audiences in spontaneous activities, which frequently built upon his methods of producing a great number of works at a fast pace in a short amount of time and which also often escalated into a collective creative frenzy. Unimpressed by the power of institutions and the art market, Horio dismantled distinctions such as between artist and audience or between works of high art and everyday practices. Horio’s work also includes the woodblock print series Myokonin-den (1992–2009), which resulted from his collaboration with Shūji Hisaka, a colleague from his workplace, as well as a large number of drawings depicting disaster-stricken scenes in and around Kobe, which he created in the aftermath of the Great Hanshin earthquake in March 1995.

== Reception ==
Horio is best known for his performances and workshops that involved the audiences in collective creative activities and his methods of creating a multiplicity of works at a high rate. He is also recognized for his engagement in the alternative art scene in the Kansai region, which showed in his manifold artistic collaborations and the support he gave to local artists and gallery owners. Horio’s works have been associated with Japanese artistic and cultural traditions, such as ceramics, calligraphy and Zen culture. The humor and everyday quality in his open-minded playful approach to artistic creation have shaped his public image.

== Exhibitions (selection) ==
- 1956 First Shinko Independent Exhibition, Shinko shimbun, Kobe
- 1957 10th Ashiya City Exhibition, Seidō Elementary School, Ashiya (Horio continued to participate in this exhibition until 2008.)
- 1964 8th Kyoto Independent Exhibition, Kyoto Municipal Museum of Art, Kyoto
- 1965 15th Gutai Art Exhibition, Gutai Pinacotheca, Osaka
- 1965 16th Gutai Art Exhibition, Keio Department Store, Tokyo
- 1966 Solo exhibition, Shinanobashi Gallery, Osaka
- 1968 Solo exhibition, Gutai Pinacotheca, Osaka
- 1979 Solo exhibition, Higashimon Gallery, Kobe
- 1980 Synchronized Spaces – Black Paint, solo exhibition, Box Gallery, Nagoya
- 1982 Solo exhibition, Art Space Niji, Kyoto (Since 1985, Horio held solo shows at Art Space Niji every year.)
- 1985 Kyoto Independent Exhibition, Kyoto Municipal Museum of Art, Kyoto
- 1985 Atarimae no koto, solo exhibition, Higashimon Gallery, Kobe
- 1993 Gutai … suite?, Palais des Arts, Toulouse
- 1993 Gutai III: 1965–1972, Ashiya City Museum of Art & History, Ashiya
- 1998 Art contemporain du Japon, Espace Ecreuil, Toulouse, Le Rire Bleu, Figeac
- 2002 Solo exhibition, Ashiya City Museum of Art & History, Ashiya
- 2004 Rencontre internationale d’art performance de Québec, Le Lieu, Québec, Canada
- 2005 Yokohama Triennale 2005, Yamashita Dock, Yokohama
- 2009 Minna no Museum 2009, Museum of Modern Art, Toyama
- 2009 In-Finitum, Palazzo Fortuny, Venice
- 2011 Solo exhibition, Axel Vervoordt Gallery, Antwerp
- 2011 Tra: Edge of Becoming, Palazzo Fortuny, Venice
- 2012 Explosion! Painting as Action, Moderna Museet, Stockholm
- 2013 Gutai: Splendid Playground, Guggenheim Museum, New York
- 2016 A Feverish Era: Art Informel and the Expansion of Japanese Artistic Expression in the 1950s and ’60s, The National Museum of Modern Art, Kyoto
- 2016 A Feverish Era in Japanese Art, Bozar Centre for Fine Arts, Brussels
- 2018 Catastrophe and the Power of Art, Mori Art Museum, Tokyo
- 2022 Listen to the Sound of the Earth Turning: Our Wellbeing Since the Pandemic, Mori Art Museum, Tokyo
