= Theodora Varnay Jones =

Theodora Varnay Jones is a Hungarian-born American artist known for her abstract work on paper.

== Education ==
Born Theodora Varnay in Budapest in 1942, Jones earned both her B.F.A. and her M.F.A. at the Budapest Academy of Fine Arts, where she studied with Aurél Bernáth and Jenő Barcsay. She moved to the United States in the early 1970s.

== Career ==
Jones makes Constructivist-inspired and Minimalist-inflected abstract work in many media, including photography, drawing, frottage, printmaking, sculpture, and installation. Much of her work is monochromatic or deploys a very limited palette, and she often uses translucent papers for layered effects. Typically, she strives to "objectify" her mark-making, setting up strict rules for a particular composition or otherwise restricting conscious control of the work in progress. Her "ephemeral abstractions" have been called "refreshing and deeply nurturing" and a form of "methodical lyricism."

Jones' Marking Time series (2020) originated as a response to the COVID-19 pandemic. Featuring many tiny burnt holes, these pieces reference the frustrations brought on during that period of confinement and limited activities. Her several series of frottage works created since 2015 are typically made using translucent paper and then layered together, creating seductive images that are hard to identify. Jones refers to frottage as a form of "primitive photography," and her work highlights the relationship between this form of drawing and traditional photography. Her 2010 Metamorphosis series — produced during a residency at the Institute of Contemporary Art in San Jose, California — is a set of transformations that started with crumpled sheets of typing paper that were then photographed, layered, overdrawn, and finally printed using the intaglio process.

More sculptural is "Analogy," a 2015 series of small works using discarded computer chips layered with drawings on translucent media, highlighting the geometry of the chips' surface elements. Other sculptural works include the "Transparency" series of geometric abstractions in wood or fiberglass with clear acrylic elements and an abstract chess set in unfired ceramic that was an homage to Marcel Duchamp.

Since 1988, she has exhibited regularly with Don Soker Contemporary Art in San Francisco and has had shows at the Fresno Art Museum, the Oakland Museum, and the Berkeley Art Museum, among other venues. She has also frequently exhibited her work internationally, with shows at galleries and museums in Japan, Germany, Spain, Brazil, and Hungary, among other countries. Her work is held in the permanent collections of the Crocker Art Museum, the Berkeley Art Museum, the Fresno Art Museum, the Museum of Contemporary Art and Design in Costa Rica, the Art Complex Museum in Massachusetts, and other institutions. "Manifold," a ten-year retrospective at the San Jose Institute for Contemporary Art in 2009–10, was singled out for bringing emotional resonance and a high level of craft and inventiveness to geometric Minimalism.

Jones has won numerous awards and grants, including the Adolph and Esther Gottlieb Individual Support Grant, the New York Foundation for the Arts Fellowship, the California Arts Council Visual Arts Fellowship, and the Jerome Foundation Fellowship. She has been an artist in residence at the Morris Graves Foundation and the Lucid Art Foundation in Inverness, California.

== Exhibitions ==
=== Selected solo shows ===
- "Conversing Between the Analogous," Don Soker Gallery, San Francisco, 2023
- "Dialectics: angles of cognition, in the orbit of photography," Don Soker Gallery, San Francisco, 2018
- "Resonances," Stanford Art Spaces, Stanford University, 2015
- " Appearances," Lena & Roselli Galeria, Budapest, Hungary, 2015
- "Theodora Varnay Jones: Prints & Drawings: Selected Archival Work," Baczek Gallery, Berkeley, CA, 2011
- "Manifold," Institute for Contemporary Art, San Jose, CA, 2009–10
- "Translucent Phenomena," Fresno Art Museum, Fresno, CA, 2008
- "Theodora Varnay Jones," Galerie Reinfeld, Bremen, Germany, 2005
- "Theodora Varnay Jones," Gallery Hirawata, Fujisawa, Kanagawa, Japan, 2003
- "Theodora Varnay Jones," SFMOMA Artists Gallery, San Francisco, 2001
- "Microcosmos," Schleswig-Holstein Music Festival, Bad Segeberg, Germany, 2000
- "Theodora Varnay Jones," Vasarely Museum, Budapest, Hungary, 1996
- "Theodora Varnay Jones," Shirakawa Gallery, Kyoto, Japan, 1995
- "Theodora Varnay Jones," Chicashige Gallery, Okayama, Japan, 1995
- "Theodora Varnay Jones," Art Forum Yanaka, Tokyo, Japan, 1990
- "Theodora Varnay Jones," Taller Galleria Fort, Cadaques, Spain, 1985

=== Selected group shows ===
- "M for Water," diRosa Center for Contemporary Art, CA, 2024
- "To Exalt the Ephemeral: The (Im)permanent Collection," Berkeley Art Museum and Pacific Film Archive, 2024
- "From Moment to Moment; Theodora Varnay Jones, Robin Richardson, and Marta Sanchez-Vasquez," Pastine Projects, San Francisco, 2022
- "Art in the Time of Corona," NUMU New Museum, Los Gatos, CA, 2021
- "Hardly Strictly Mini," Bolinas Art Museum, CA, 2019
- "The Artists' Annual," Kala Art Institute Gallery, Berkeley, CA, 2019
- "12th Annual Encaustic Invitational," Conrad Wilde Gallery, Tucson, AZ, 2017
- "The Future Imagined: What’s Next?," Zero1 Biannual, Performance Art Institute, San Francisco, 2012
- "Tomorrow's Legacies," Crocker Art Museum, Sacramento, CA, 2010
- "The Seduction of Duchamp," The Museums of Los Gatos, CA, 2010
- "Theodora Varnay Jones and Tom Bills," Pacifica Center for the Arts, CA, 2007
- "Theodora Varnay Jones and Lee Imonen," Campbell Hall Gallery, Western Oregon University, 2002
- "Traces; Theodora Varnay Jones, Christel Dillbohner and Mary Ijichi," Palo Alto Art Center, CA, 2001
- "Theodora Varnay Jones and Hoh Yin Ping," Kassenarztliche Vereinigung, Bremen, Germany, 2000
