= Gutai Art Association =

Japanese art group

- 具体美術協会; Gutai Bijutsu Kyōkai
- Formation: 1954; 72 years ago
- Dissolved: 1972; 54 years ago
- Headquarters: Ashiya, Japan
- Leader: Jiro Yoshihara

The Gutai Art Association (具体美術協会, Gutai Bijutsu Kyōkai; or, short, Gutai) was a Japanese avant-garde artist group founded in the Hanshin region by young artists under the leadership of the painter Jirō Yoshihara in Ashiya, Japan, in 1954. It operated until shortly after Yoshihara's death in 1972.

The group, today one of the most internationally-recognized instances of 20th century Japanese art, is best known for the broad range of experimental art forms combining painting with performance, conceptual, interactive, site-specific, theatrical and installation artworks, which its members explored in unconventional venues such as public parks and on stage. The members’ engagement with the relationship between spirit, human body and material, often concretized in artistic methods that involved the artist’s body and violent gestures.

Fueled by Yoshihara’s ambitions, global scope and strategic awareness, Gutai’s exhibitions and publications reached audiences around the world, realizing what Yoshihara called an “international common ground” of art. Gutai exchanged and collaborated with many artists, art critics and curators from Europe, the US and South Africa, among them the French art critic Michel Tapié and the artists he promoted, art dealers Martha Jackson in New York and Rodolphe Stadler in Paris, the Dutch artist group Nul, the German artist group Zero, and individual artists including John Cage, Christo Coetzee, Merce Cunningham, Paul Jenkins, Ray Johnson, Isamu Noguchi, and Robert Rauschenberg. Until the group’s dissolution in 1972 following Yoshihara’s death, around 60 artists were involved as members.

The critical reception of Gutai was strongly affected by the shifts in art discourse from the 1950s to the late 1960s, particularly from gestural painting to more performative approaches and so-called anti-art movements of the 1960s. While Gutai works are recognized for anticipating ideas and approaches of European and American art of the 1960s, such as performance, happening, pop, minimal, conceptual, environmental and land art, Gutai artists referred to a broader understanding of picturing embodied in the Japanese term e (picture), which allowed them to overcome conventions of painting.

== History ==
=== Foundation, 1954 ===
Gutai was founded in 1954 by artists under the leadership of the Ashiya-based painter and businessman Jirō Yoshihara, who was an influential figure in the revitalization of cultural life in Japan in the post-World War II years. Yoshihara, a member of Nika-kai, had co-founded the Ashiya City Art Association in 1947, engaged in the establishment of the Ashiya City Exhibitions, and mentored young artists. In 1951, he co-founded the Gendai Bijutsu Kondankai (Contemporary Art Discussion Group, known as Genbi), a forum for interdisciplinary exchange and discussion of East-Asian and Western modern and traditional arts, including ikebana, calligraphy and pottery. Genbi artists shared a preference for abstract art and had a strongly international scope fueled by their ongoing engagement with European and US-American artists, which became also a key aspect for Gutai.

In late 1954, Yoshihara and 16 artists, including his students (e.g. Tsuruko Yamazaki and Shozo Shimamoto, his students since 1946 and 1947), Genbi and Ashiya City Exhibition participants, decided to create a new group under the name of Gutai (the name was proposed by Shimamoto) and to issue a journal under the same name. The founding members were Sadami Azuma, Kei Iseya, Tamiko Ueda, Chiyū Uemae, Hiroshi Okada, Hajime Okamoto, Shōzō Shimamoto, Yoshio Sekine, Shigeru Tsujimura, Tōichirō Fujikawa, Hiroshi Funai, Masanobu Masatoshi, Tsuruko Yamazaki, Toshio Yoshida, Hideo Yoshihara, Jirō Yoshihara and his son Michio Yoshihara. The first issue of Gutai appeared in January 1955.

In March 1955, several founding members showed paintings all entitled Gutai at the 3rd Yomiuri Independent Exhibition at the Tokyo Metropolitan Art Museum in March 1955, but until the summer of 1955, more than half of them had left the group (some disappointed by the priority that Yoshihara gave to the Gutai journal instead of actual exhibitions). However, the group took a stronger, more conceptual direction following this break with the addition of new members such as Sadamasa Motonaga, and the artists of Zero-kai (Zero Society) Akira Kanayama, Saburō Murakami, Kazuo Shiraga, and Atsuko Tanaka.

=== Artistic ideas ===
By choosing the Japanese term gutai, which means concrete, as opposed to both abstract (chūshō) and figurative (gushō), the group distinguished themselves from contemporary figurative art, such as Surrealism and social realism, as well as from formalist geometric abstraction. The kanji used to write 'gu' meaning tool, measures, or a way of doing something, while 'tai' means body. The individual artistic approaches of many members were characterized by unconventional, experimental methods of applying paint, which they soon extended to three dimensional objects, performance, and installation works. Yoshihara constantly urged his younger fellows to “Create what has never been done before!”, and by proposing unconventional exhibition formats, he stimulated the creation of radically innovative works that transcended conventional definitions of artistic genres. This dynamic artistic relationship between Yoshihara and his younger fellow members over the years engendered Gutai’s “culture of experimentation”.

==== Gutai Art Manifesto (1956) ====
In the “Gutai Art Manifesto”, published in the December issue of the art magazine Geijutsu shinchō in 1956, Yoshihara stated that Gutai Art aspired “to go beyond abstraction” and “to pursue … the possibilities of pure creativity,” rejecting conventions and the limits of genres. Also, that Gutai Art envisioned a dynamic relationship between the human spirit and matter, which enabled matter to speak for itself and celebrate the process of damage or decay as a way of revealing its inner life:

“Gutai Art imparts life to matter. Gutai Art does not distort matter. In Gutai Art, the human spirit and matter shake hands with each other while keeping their distance. […] Now, interestingly, we find a contemporary beauty in the art and architecture of the past ravaged by the passage of time or natural disasters. Although their beauty is considered decadent, it may be that the innate beauty of matter is reemerging from behind the mask of artificial embellishment. Ruins unexpectedly welcome us with warmth and friendliness; they speak to us through their beautiful cracks and rubble—which might be a revenge of matter that has regained its innate life. … We believe that by merging human qualities and material properties, we can concretely comprehend abstract space.”

Stressing the importance of artistic creativity to individual autonomy and freedom, Yoshihara in the first Gutai issue claimed: “What matters most to us is to ensure that contemporary art provides a site enabling the people living through the severe present to be set free. We firmly believe that the creations accomplished in that free site can contribute to the progress of mankind. […] We hope to present concrete proof that our spirits are free. We never cease to pursue fresh emotions in all types of plastic arts. We look forward to finding friends in all visual arts.” Many of the Gutai artists, such as Yoshihara, Shimamoto, Yamazaki, Yōzō Ukita, Murakami, and Tanaka participated in art education, particularly for young children. They gave art classes, assisted with child art exhibitions such as the Dōbiten (Young children art exhibition) organized by the Ashiya City Art Association, and contributed to the children free poetry magazine Kirin, where they advocated for the fostering of children’s free creative expression.

When published in Geijutsu shinchō in December 1956, the text of the “Gutai Art Manifesto” was framed with pictures of Gutai members showing their creative procedures at the occasion of the 2nd Gutai Art Exhibition in Tokyo in October 1956, shot by the magazine's photographer Kiyoji Ōtsuji.

=== Gutai journal ===
The group's journal Gutai served as an important vehicle to promote members’ works and to connect with art audiences all over the world across art genres, including artists, critics, art historians, book dealers, such as Jackson Pollock, Ben Friedman, George Wittenborn, Ray Johnson, Michel Tapié, Martha Jackson, Henk Peeters, Jean Clay and Allan Kaprow. The journals consisted of documentations of members’ works and the group’s exhibition projects through plates, photographs and articles. While the first issue of Gutai, published in January 1955 as first official act of the group, mainly consisted of photographic plates of members’ works, beginning with the second issue (October 1955), the journal adapted a square format and lavish design that freely arranged drawings, graphic prints, photographs, and texts. The issues experimented with different qualities of paper, included cutouts and original paper works. In total, between 1955 and 1965, 12 of 14 issues of Gutai appeared, with issues numbers 10 and 13 never having been published. As evidence of Yoshihara’s global ambitions, the names of the members were written in roman letters, and Gutai issues included texts written by Gutai members with English, and later also French, translations, as well as contributions by artists and critics from abroad. The edition of the issues nos. 8, 9 and 10 were supervised by Yoshihara and Tapié. A facsimile edition of the Gutai journal, supplemented by English translations and scholarly essays, was published in 2010.

=== Outdoor exhibitions ===
Gutai organized and participated in several experimental outdoor art projects, such as the Experimental Outdoor Exhibition of Modern Art to Challenge the Midsummer Sun at the Ashiya Park in July 1955, an open-air exhibition that was open twenty-four hours a day for two weeks. In this exhibition, which was officially organized by the Ashiya City Art Association, but de facto realized by Gutai members, the participants, who also included amateurs and school children, had to follow the exhibition committee’s requirements to withstand weather conditions such as sun, rain and wind as well as take into consideration the characteristics of the exhibition venue, and the risks of damage and theft. In response, they created large-scale three-dimensional works made of industrially produced materials for everyday use, construction materials, and scrap material: Sadamasa Motonaga suspended a vinyl bag filled with coloured water from the branches of a tree; Yasuo Sumi set up wire mesh covered with enamel paint; Atsuko Tanaka’s pinned a pink nylon sheet just above the ground that rippled in the wind; Kazuo Shiraga built a tent-like structure with wooden poles, which he slashed with an axe from inside. Tsuruko Yamazaki’s Danger consisted in a row of sharply-edged tin plates hanging from the trees. Engaging with natural and technical conditions, the participants created numerous experimental works including performative, interactive and installation artworks that explored the relationship between object, site and beholder and which pre-dated artistic tendencies that arose in Europe and the US in the 1960s, such as performance, site-specific, earth, environmental and installation art.

Works from the first outdoor exhibition and from the 1st Gutai Art Exhibition in fall 1955 became part of a photoshoot for LIFE magazine. The One Day Only Outdoor Art Exhibition (April 1956) took place at the Yoshihara Oil Mill Factory’s grounds in Nishinomiya and in the ruins of the company’s factory in Amagasaki, and featured Gutai member performances and staged demonstrations of their creative processes. The photographs were never published in LIFE, but the photoshoot is evidence of an early international interest in Gutai, as well as the scale of the group’s ambition.

At the Outdoor Gutai Art Exhibition in summer 1956, again held at the Ashiya Park, the participants further explored the interactivity of their works with visitors and the natural environment, including works that used the effects of electric light in the dark, such as Yamazaki’s large cube of red vinyl hanging from the tree, or Jirō Yoshihara’s column made of paper lanterns, Light Art, or Michio Yoshihara’s work in which electric bulbs were set up in the ground. Shōzō Shimamoto created a painting by hanging a fifty-foot-long canvas hung from the trees and shooting paint out of a canon; Motonaga created a large version of Work (Water) by suspending long vinyl sheets with colored water between trees; Akira Kanayama rolled out a 100 m-long (330 ft) sheet of vinyl, onto which he had painted Footprints throughout the park, and Tanaka created Stage Clothes, consisting of giant geometrically abstracted humanoid forms with electric bulbs on the front side that were lit every evening.

Gutai continued to organize and participate in further open-air projects, such as the International Sky Festival on the rooftop of the Takashimaya department store in Osaka (1960), at which reproductions of works by American Abstract Expressionist and European Informel artists were hung from balloons, the Zero op Zee (Zero on Sea) exhibition planned by the Dutch group Nul as a large scale show at the Scheveningen Pier in The Hague in 1966 (which was never realized), and Gutai’s collective large-scale garden sculpture for the Expo ‘70.

=== Gutai Art Exhibitions ===
Adapting the practice of established art associations, Gutai held its own annual group exhibitions to display their works in indoor settings beginning in 1955. Until the group’s dissolution, 21 Gutai Art Exhibitions were held at venues such as the Ohara Hall in Tokyo, the Municipal Museum of Art of Kyoto, and gallery spaces of the Takashimaya and the Keio department stores in Osaka and Tokyo.

The Gutai Art Exhibitions at the Ohara Hall in Tokyo in 1955 and 1956 are particularly known for the public performances by some members, which emphasized the use of the human body engaging with various materials in violent gestures. At the 1st Gutai Art Exhibition in October 1955, Kazuo Shiraga stripped to his underwear and wrestled a heap of mud, leaving the traces of his struggle in the kneaded material (Challenging Mud, 1955). In the exhibition rooms, Saburō Murakami used his body to punch and tear through sets of large paper screens (6 Holes, 1955), which remained on display. Other exhibits included paintings, paper works, Motonaga’s stone objects and little vinyl bags filled with tinted water in different colors, Kanayama’s huge red room-filling balloon, Yamazaki’s tin cans painted in pink paint, and other unconventional works that challenged the very notions of painting and art. At the 2nd Gutai Art Exhibition (fall 1956), Gutai members presented their artistic processes for the press/photographers. On the building’s rooftop, Shimamoto shattered glass bottles filled with paint on canvases/paper laid on the ground, Murakami tore and stumbled through 24 paper screens Passage (1956), and Shiraga demonstrated his method of foot painting. Also, some of the photos shot by the photographer Kiyoji Ōtsuji at this occasion were used to frame the “Gutai Art Manifesto”, which was published in the art magazine Geijutsu shinchō in December 1956.

The Gutai Group Exhibition at the Martha Jackson Gallery in New York in fall 1958, which was retroactively renamed the 6th Gutai Art Exhibition, was the group’s first exhibition outside of Japan. The show was facilitated by the French art critic Michel Tapié, who, having learned about Gutai via Japanese painters Hisao Dōmoto and Toshimitsu Imai in Paris, had travelled to Japan in fall 1957 to meet the group. Tapié at that time was promoting Informel as a global art movement and was advising the New York art dealer Martha Jackson. Yoshihara travelled to the US to participate in the preparations. Tapié and Yoshihara mainly selected Informel-style paintings by Gutai artists for this exhibition, which, in the context of the shift of the New York art scene from abstract expressionism towards …, led to criticism of their works as being derivatives of Pollock, (Dore Ashton) However, Tapié’s European networks provided Gutai the opportunities to exhibit in art spaces in Turin in 1959 and 1960. Their group exhibition at the Galleria Arti Figurative in Turin in 1959 was renamed as 7th Gutai Art Exhibition.

The Gutai Art Exhibitions provided the main venue for the members to show their works, supplemented by the Gutai Art Small-Works Exhibitions, the Gutai Art New Artists Exhibitions, and the Gutai Art New-Work Exhibitions, as well as the members’ solo exhibitions at the group’s own gallery Gutai Pinacotheca in Osaka, which was opened in 1962. The 21st Gutai Art Exhibition in 1968 was the last show. With the growing recognition of members as solo artists and the emergence of commercial art galleries for contemporary art in Japan, members such as Yoshihara, Shiraga, Motonaga, and Tanaka increasingly participated in other major group exhibitions of contemporary Japanese art in Japan as well as abroad. The Ashiya City Exhibition continued to provide an important platform, however, for most Gutai members throughout the years.

=== Stage shows ===
In 1957 and 1958, Gutai presented two live stage shows entitled Gutai Art on the Stage that were presented at the Asahi Halls in Osaka and Tokyo. The shows consisted of a dramaturgically staged suite of individual performances by the members. During the show in 1957, Kanayama painted red and black lines on a large balloon resulting in a web-like pattern. This balloon was inflated slowly, becoming a sculptural piece that rotated under lights of changing colors. The balloon was then cut and deflated, almost returning to it its original state. Shimamoto hit electric bulbs hanging from the ceiling with a stick, and Murakami adapted his method of paper-tearing into a stage version of hitting large paper screens with a stick. Tanaka ripped and stripped off multiple layers of clothes in a performance, but she also set up her giant Stage Clothes from the outdoor exhibition 1956 and her Electric Dress from the 2nd Gutai Art Exhibition. Kazuo Shiraga performed his own modern version of the traditional Sanbasō dance from traditional Kyōgen and Noh theater, wearing a red costume with exaggeratedly extended sleeves and hat. Motonaga shot rings of smoke into the hall with a canon-like apparatus. Sound and music played an important role in these performances with Shimamoto, Michio Yoshihara and Motonaga experimenting freely with electric sounds and sounds from everyday life.

Over the years, Gutai engaged in further stage productions in addition to collaborating on fashion shows. In November 1962, Gutai presented the stage show Don’t Worry, the Moon Won’t Fall at the Sankei Hall in Osaka in collaboration with the Osaka-based Morita Modern Dance company of dancers Masahiro and Masuyo Morita. In the first part, staged by Gutai, the members presented works from their stage show in 1957 such as Kanayama’s Balloon (1957) and Shiraga’s Ultra-Modern Sanbasō (1957) or from other previous exhibitions such as Murakami’s Passage (1956). Shūji Mukai, who had just joined Gutai, made a performance in which he painted archaic signs over the faces of participants who stuck their heads through holes in a standing board while they were singing scat. At the Expo ‘70 in Osaka, Gutai staged the spectacular entertainment show Gutai Art Festival.

=== Gutai and Informel ===
In 1957, the French art critic Michel Tapié learned about Gutai from two Paris-based Japanese painters, Hisao Dōmoto and Toshimitsu Imai. Inspired by the works printed in the Gutai journal, Tapié travelled that year to Japan to meet Gutai and other artists in Japan. Tapié was a promoter of European gestural abstract art under the term Informel and US-American Abstract Expressionism, including works by artists such as Jean Fautrier, Jean Dubuffet, Lucio Fontana, Giuseppe Capogrossi, Jackson Pollock, Helen Frankenthaler, and Robert Motherwell. For Tapié, Gutai, with their innovative and dynamic gestural and material approach to painting, was the ideal partner to prove the global relevance of Informel. Gutai’s collaboration with Tapié resulted in publications and exhibitions that Yoshihara and Tapié supervised and curated jointly, such as the Gutai journal no. 8 (1958) and the exhibition International Art of a New Era: Informel and Gutai, which took place at the Takashimaya department store in Osaka in April 1958 and subsequently travelled to Nagasaki, Hiroshima, Kyoto and Tokyo. On the occasion of the 9th Gutai Art Exhibition at the Takashimaya department store in Osaka in April 1960, Gutai set up The International Sky Festival on the building’s roof top, “exhibiting” works by 30 US-American, European and Japanese artists that were copied onto banners by the Gutai members and lifted into the air by advertising balloons.

Thanks to Tapié’s support and extensive network of artists, collectors and galleries around the world, Gutai members’ works were shown in numerous group and solo exhibitions in cities in the US and Europe, including the Martha Jackson Gallery in New York, the Galerie Stadler in Paris, to which Tapié served as advisor, and art spaces in Turin. Gutai members such as Shiraga, Tanaka and Motonaga signed contracts with Tapié or the art dealers to deliver works on a regular basis. The Gutai Group Exhibition at the Martha Jackson Gallery in New York in fall 1958, retroactively renamed the 6th Gutai Art Exhibition, was the group’s first exhibition outside of Japan. Tapié and Yoshihara mainly selected Informel-style paintings for this exhibition, which were criticized by US art critics as being derivative of Abstract Expressionist art. Recognizing the risks of this unfavorable reception, Yoshihara began to distinguish Gutai from Tapié’s Informel. For example, in his essay published in the journal Notizie published by the Circolo degli Artisti in Turin in 1959, he presented the group’s broad range artistic production and emphasized its unprecedented innovativeness.

The distribution of knowledge about Gutai, which was facilitated by Tapié by these exhibitions and publications, however, provided the basis for Gutai’s recognition in avant-garde and experimental art circles, such as by the German artist group Nul and the Dutch artist group Zero, or by US-American performance artist Allan Kaprow.

=== Gutai Pinacotheca, 1962 ===
In 1962, Gutai’s own art space Gutai Pinacotheca opened on the Nakanoshima sandbank in the center of Osaka. It consisted of three old storage houses owned by Yoshihara, which had been converted into a fashionable modern gallery space. With an exhibition space of app. 370 qm, the Gutai Pinacotheca became the main venue for Gutai’s smaller group shows and solo exhibitions of members, as well as European and US-American artists such as Lucio Fontana, Giuseppe Capogrossi, and Sam Francis. The Gutai Pinacotheca became a go-to-place for artists, art critics and curators from abroad visiting Japan, such as Lawrence Alloway, John Cage, Merce Cunningham, Francis, Clement Greenberg, Peggy Guggenheim, Jasper Johns, Paul Jenkins, Billy Klüver, Isamu Noguchi, Robert Rauschenberg, Pierre Restany, Jean Tinguely. Thus, the opening of Gutai Pinacotheca marked the group’s establishment within the globalizing art world. The Pinacotheca was closed in April 1970 due to an urban planning project. Yoshihara’s plans for a new Pinacotheca were not realized, except of a short-lived art space called Mini Pinacotheca, which opened in 1971.

=== Mail art ===
The Gutai artists utilized nengajo, or New Years postcards, for their mail art. Nengajo were more than just greeting cards. They have long traditional significance and serve as a ritualistic social interaction, which reflects the Gutai goal of giving spirit to the typically inanimate. Motonaga Sadamasa sent what is believed to be the first Gutai nengajõ to Tsuruko Yamazaki in 1956. The card showed green, blue, red, yellow, and black pigments, which were then smudged to animate the markings. The mailing imparted the paintings with life and also pushed the limits of painting in regard to time and space. It also expanded the limits of exhibition spaces, which was another goal of the Gutai group. As stated by Dick Higgins, "There are two ways you can introduce time into a piece: turn it into a performance, or allow it to reveal itself slowly, through the mail."

At the 11th Gutai Art Exhibition, visitors could pay ten yen to a Gutai Card box to receive a nengajo from one of the Gutai members inside of the box. This was viewed as a performance, not consumerism, and the money went to a children's charity, which furthered the nengajo idea of a gift.

=== Gutai and Nul ===
Having seen photographs of Gutai’s outdoor and stage works in Tapié’s book Continuité et avant-garde au Japon (1961), the Dutch artist Henk Peeters invited Gutai to participate in the exhibition NUL 1965 at the Stedelijk Museum in Amsterdam in 1965, which aimed to show a global new trend towards the integration of technology, kinetics, natural elements, and electric light in art. In contrast to Tapié, Peeters was only interested in Gutai’s early three-dimensional installation works from between 1955 and 1957, such as Murakami’s 6 Holes, Yamazaki’s painted tin cans, Kanayama’s balloon or Shimamoto’s wooden object to walk on, which were all reproduced on site by and under the supervision of Yoshihara and his son Michio. The more recent gestural canvas paintings Yoshihara had brought with him were not shown. The NUL 1965 show marked a turning point towards a recognition of Gutai as pioneer of global art trends of the 1960s, distinct from and originating prior to other participating artists, as Yoshihara, for example, made sure that the early production dates of Gutai works were clearly stated.

With the opening of the Gutai Pinacotheca, the shift of global art discourses towards experimental approaches, the expansion of Gutai’s collaborations and the growing critical recognition of members as fixtures of contemporary (Japanese) art, Gutai became an institution until the mid-1960s. To stimulate and rejuvenate the group, Yoshihara actively recruited emerging younger artists from the Hanshin region as so-called second and third generation members of Gutai. Artists such as Sadaharu Horio, Norio Imai, Kumiko Imanaka, Tsuyoshi Maekawa, Takesada Matsutani, Shūji Mukai, Yūko Nasaka, Minoru Onoda and Minoru Yoshida brought in new approaches, while around that time many first-generation Gutai members such as Yoshihara Motonaga, Shiraga, and Yamazaki adopted new methods, material and styles of painting, shifting from their earlier gestural abstraction to more simplified visual languages that resonated with hard-edge painting, pop and op art.

=== Expo ‘70 ===
At the Expo ‘70, which took place in Osaka from March 15 to September 13, 1970, works by Gutai members were included in the main art exhibition, but also a special Gutai group exhibition with futuristic and technology-inspired mixed-media works was held in the entrance of the Midori Hall. The group also contributed a collaborative outdoor installation work Garden on Garden. Furthermore, on three successive days during the expo, the group staged the “extravaganza” Gutai Art Festival: Drama of Man and Matter at the Festival Plaza, a show composed of a sequence of individual performances which included men floating on giant balloons, remotely controlled toy dogs, and men in bubble blowing fire trucks.

=== Dissolution, 1972 ===
As a large group of many artists with individuals approaches, shifts and tensions within the group were a constant factor. Also facing the developing solo careers of individual members such as Shiraga, Tanaka, and Motonaga around 1960, Yoshihara, managed to keep the group together by constantly recruiting and bringing in new and younger members. More than half of the founding members had quit in the first months of 1955, and first-generation members, Tanaka and Kanayama in the mid-1960s, and Murakami and Motonaga around 1970, began to detach themselves from Gutai, but maintained their membership. In February 1972, Yoshihara died while preparing Gutai’s participation in the Floriade garden festival in Amsterdam. Subsequently, the group’s members unanimously decided to end Gutai and publicly announced the dissolution in March 1972.

== Critical reception and legacy ==
Gutai’s art historical assessment was strongly affected by the shifts in global art discourses on modernism and avant-garde, from abstract gestural painting of the 1950s to experimental and performative and conceptual approaches of the 1960s.

At the beginning, Gutai artists’ experimental creative methods that were often violent yet playful, were not valued by mainstream art criticism, but rather reported on as spectacular stunts.[1] In 1957, Gutai’s position within the Japanese art world improved, when European and US-American artists and art critics, who had learned about Gutai through intermediaries, the Gutai journal and articles in major newspapers such as The New York Times, began to manifest their interest in the group. Additionally, the Gutai members’ dynamic gestural visual language resonated with a hype for Informel art in Japan in the mid-1950s. However, this association backfired when Abstract Expressionism, Informel art and Tapié came under attack as being outdated with the rise of post-painting performance, Happenings, and installation art. Yoshihara, aware of the shifts in the global art discourse, managed to align his group with new artistic allies such as Nul and Zero in the early 1960s. By the mid-1960s, Gutai, now disposing of its own exhibition space Pinacotheca, had established itself as a fixture of the Japanese art world, as a group of painters as well as performance artists, particularly after Allan Kaprow in his seminal publication Assemblage, Environments, and Happenings (1966) framed the group’s early performative works as “prototypes” of happenings.

Echoing these artistic exchanges, the art historical assessment of Gutai following the group’s dissolution has often oscillated between an understanding of Gutai works as paintings or as performances. However, since the mid-1990s, scholarship has shed light on the concept of e (picturing), which allowed the Gutai artists to overcome narrow Euro-American art conventions and concepts of art genres.

== Biennale di Venezia 2009 ==
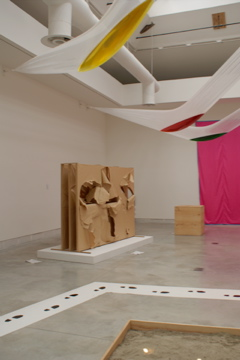

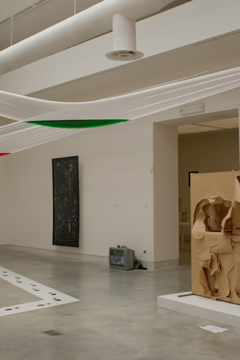

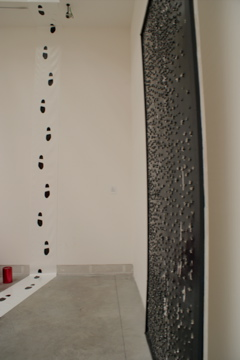

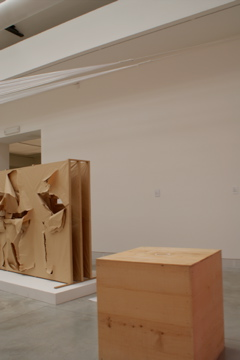

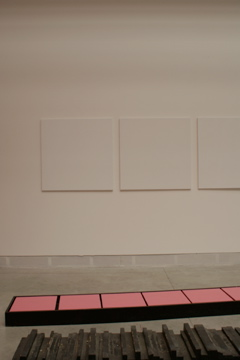

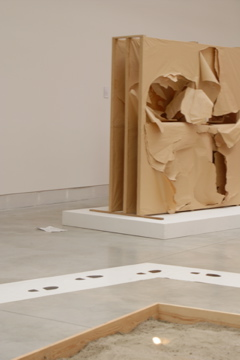

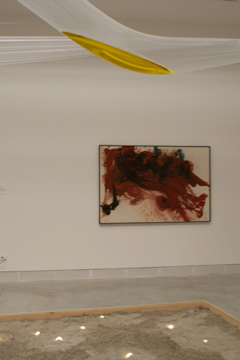

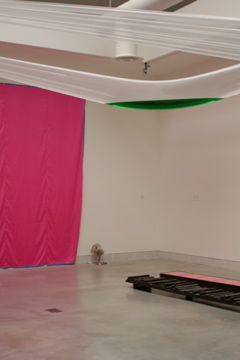

== Criticism ==
Gutai's first American appearance at the Martha Jackson Gallery in 1958 faced many accusations from critics exclaiming that the art was imitating Jackson Pollock. However, Gutai art did not copy from Pollock but rather took what inspiration it needed to be able to address the issue of freedom after the world war in Japan. Yoshihara praised Pollock as the greatest living American painter and admired his pure originality and concrete interpretation of freedom. Yoshihara shared with Pollock a desire to embody nature as opposed to creating representational art. Yoshihara accepted being in the same aesthetic realm as Pollock, however, he aggressively strived to create a distinct style. Prone to the assumption that Japanese artists follow Western artists, Yoshihara insisted Gutai artists create an extremely distinguished style. One thing Yoshihara did to try to avoid derivative accusations was to have his pupils study in his library to learn about contemporary issues so that their work could compete with the art of the center. Gutai work made from bodily processes did find inspiration in Jackson Pollock's drip paintings, yet expanded on these concepts drastically.

At a glance, Gutai's early paintings may look like Jackson Pollock's drip paintings, however their approach and methods were radically different. If one compares Jackson Pollock's, Number 7 to Sumi Yasuo's work. Pollock's is deliberate and composted within rectilinear bounds. Whereas Yasuo worked by "going recklessly wild" and splattering paint. Gutai was also called Dadaistic in which Yoshihara addressed in the manifesto, "Sometimes, at first glance, we are compared with and mistaken for Dadaism, and we ourselves fully recognize the achievements of Dadaism. But we think differently, in contrast to Dadaism, our work is the result of investigating the possibilities of calling the material to life." Gutai specialist Fergus McCaffrey said, "Shiraga and other members of the Gutai Art Association had their work dismissed as derivative of second-generation Abstract Expressionism when showing at Martha Jackson Gallery in New York in 1958, and it is only recently that we have been able to shake off that terrible misunderstanding." Jiro Yoshihara sought to create a genre that was beyond classification in pursuit of true originality despite these earlier accusations.

In 2013, the Gutai group's artworks were collectively ranked by Dale Eisinger of Complex as the fifth greatest work of performance art, with the writer arguing, "Jiro engaged in correspondence with American Happenings artist Allan Kaprow, resulting in engaging multimedia art that traded ideas across an East-West dialog in a way never before realized."

== Politics ==
Gutai had a very important political message. They tried to do what has not been done before in the history of Japan. In the 1950s modern Japanese art was dominated by the theme of Social Realism. During that time refined abstraction (in particular, post-war Nihonga) was exported to foreign exhibitions as Japanese art that is representative of their artistic expression. A growing desire to escape this monotony was evident. Jiro Yoshihara really pushed the young members of Gutai to escape this Artistic/political oppression, seek individuality, and to resist oppression. This definition of Freedom is inescapably found in the idealistic rights-based model that requires an escape from political oppression. Yoshihara did not directly imply or announce a political agenda for Gutai. Art historian Alexandra Munroe and curator Paul Schimmel read Gutai art as a response to the prevailing political situation in Japan in the late 1940s and early 1950s. Munroe, for instance, speculated that they engaged in their actions in order to make faster the introduction of American-style Democracy in Japan. Their deliberate ambiguity in painting released the artists from tyranny which espouses one kind of attitude, and therefore an escape towards "freedom".

The Gutai group's work can be divided into two separate phases, the first lasting from 1954 until 1961, and the second beginning in 1962 and lasting until Gutai's dissolve in 1972. Gutai's first phase and original intention upon forming was to create works in new media and expand painting to become more performative. Artists of this phase of Gutai focused on the aesthetics of destruction as an art form to respond to postwar Japan. The artists blended artist and material for psychological relief by smashing paint-filled bottles against the canvas or punching holes in Japanese paper screens to exemplify rupture and fragmentation and their desire for transformation. The second phase of Gutai works, starting in 1962, were responding to the cultural shift happening in Japan as a result of rapid population growth and technological advances.

== Retrospective exhibitions ==
- 1985–1986 Grupo Gutai. pintura y acción, Museo Español de Arte Contemporáneo, Madrid, Hyogo Prefectural Museum of Modern Art, Kobe
- 1990 具体: 未完の前衛集団, The Shoto Museum of Art, Tokyo
- 1990–1991 Giappone all'avanguardia. Il Gruppo Gutai negli anni Cinquanta, Galleria Nazionale d’Arte Moderna, Rome
- 1991 Gutai. Japanische Avantgarde / Japanese Avant-Garde 1954–1965, Mathildenhöhe, Darmstadt
- 1993 Gutai 1955/56: A Restarting Point of Japanese Contemporary Art. PICA The Inaugural Exhibition, Penrose Institute of Contemporary Arts, Tokyo
- 1994 具体 I, II, III, Ashiya City Museum of Art & History, Ashiya
- 1999 Gutai, Galerie nationale du Jeu de Paume, Paris
- 2006 ZERO. Internationale Künstler-Avantgarde der 50er/60er Jahre, Museum Kunst Palast, Düsseldorf, Musée d’Art Moderne, Saint-Étienne
- 2007 Artempo: Where Time Becomes Art, Palazzo Fortuny, Venice
- 2009 53rd Venice Biennale: “Fare Mondi”
- 2009 “Under Each Other’s Spell”: The Gutai Group and New York, Pollock-Krasner House and Study Center, New York
- 2010 Gutai: Dipingere con il tempo e con lo spazio / Painting with Time and Space, Museo Cantonale d’Arte, Lugano
- 2011 具体: ニッポンの前衛 18年の軌跡 / GUTAI: The Spirit of an Era, National Art Center Tokyo
- 2013 Gutai: Splendid Playground, The Solomon R. Guggenheim Museum, New York

== Participants ==
- Sadaharu Horio
- Norio Imai
- Kumiko Imanaka
- Akira Kanayama
- Seiko Kanno
- Joji Kikunami
- Shigeki Kitani
- Yutaka Matsuda
- Takesada Matsutani
- Keiko Moriuchi
- Sadamasa Motonaga
- Shuji Mukai
- Saburo Murakami
- Hirosi Nagare
- Senkichiro Nasaka
- Yuko Nasaka
- Minoru Onoda
- Shozo Shimamoto
- Fujiko Shiraga
- Kazuo Shiraga
- Yasuo Sumi
- Atsuko Tanaka
- Tamiko Ueda
- Chiyu Uemae
- Tsuruko Yamazaki
- Minoru Yoshida
- Toshio Yoshida
- Hideo Yoshihara
- Michio Yoshihara
- Jiro Yoshihara
- Yozo Ukita

== General references ==
=== Exhibition catalogs ===
- Japanese Art after 1945: Scream Against the Sky / 戦後日本の前衛美術空へ叫び, ed. Alexandra Munroe, exh. cat., Yokohama Bijutsukan; Solomon R. Guggenheim Museum; San Francisco Museum of Modern Art, New York: H.N. Abrams, 1994. ISBN 0-8109-3512-0, ISBN 978-0-8109-3512-9
- Gutai, eds. Françoise Bonnefoy, Sarah Clément, Isabelle Sauvage; exh. cat., Galerie nationale du jeu de paume, Paris: Galerie nationale du jeu de paume: Réunion des musées nationaux, 1999. ISBN 2-908901-68-4, ISBN 978-2-908901-68-9
- ZERO. Internationale Künstler-Avantgarde der 50er/60er Jahre, exh. cat., Museum Kunst Palast and Cantz, Düsseldorf/Ostfildern: Hatje Cantz, 2006.
- Under Each Other's Spell": The Gutai and New York, ed. Ming Tiampo, exh. cat., East Hampton: Pollock-Krasner House and Study Center, 2009 © 2009 The Stony Brook Foundation, Inc.
- Gutai: Dipingere con il tempo e con lo spazio / Gutai: Painting with Time and Space, exh. cat., Museo Cantonale d’Arte, Lugano, Cinisello Balsamo: Silvana Editoriale, 2010.
- 具体: ニッポンの前衛 18年の軌跡/GUTAI: The Spirit of an Era, exh. cat., The National Art Center, Tokyo, Tokyo: NACT, 2012.
- Gutai: Splendid Playground, eds. Ming Tiampo and Alexandra Munroe, exh. cat., The Solomon R. Guggenheim Museum, New York, New York: The Solomon R. Guggenheim Foundation, 2013.

=== Further references ===
- 具体資料集 / Gutai Documents 1954–1972, ed. Ashiya City Museum of Art & History, Ashiya: Ashiya City Museum of Art & History, 1994.
- 具体 復刻版 / Gutai, Facsimile Edition, ed. Ashiya City Museum of Art & History, Tokyo: Geika Shoin, 2010.
- "Gutai Art Association" on monoskop, https://monoskop.org/Gutai_Art_Association (Retrieved 2022-04-13)
- Held, John jr., “Why Gutai?”, SFAQ 11 (Nov/Dec/Jan 2012/2013): 92–111.
- Hirai, Shoichi, 具体ってなんだ? 結成50周年の前衛美術グループ18年の記録 / What’s Gutai?, Tokyo: Bijutsu Shuppansha, 2004.
- Kee, Joan, “Situating a Singular Kind of ‘Action’: Early Gutai Painting, 1954–1957”, Oxford Art Journal 26/2 (2003): 121–140.
- Munroe, Alexandra, “To Challenge the Mid-Summer Sun: The Gutai Group”, Japanese Art After 1945: Scream Against the Sky, ed. Alexandra Munroe, exh. cat., Yokohama Bijutsukan, Solomon R. Guggenheim Museum, New York, San Francisco Museum of Modern Art, New York: H.N. Abrams, 1994, 83–124.
- Munroe, Alexandra, "All The Landscapes: Gutai's World", Gutai: Splendid Playground, eds. Ming Tiampo and Alexandra Munroe, exh. cat., The Solmon R. Guggenheim Museum, New York, New York: The Solomon R. Guggenheim Foundation, 2013, 21–43.
- Osaki, Shinichiro, “Art in Gutai: Action into Painting”, 具体資料集 / Gutai Documents 1954–1972, ed. Ashiya City Museum of Art & History, Ashiya: Ashiya City Museum of Art & History, 1994.
- Osaki, Shinichiro, “Body and Place: Action in Postwar Art in Japan”, Out of Actions: Between Performance and the Object 1949–1979, exh. cat., The Museum of Contemporary Art, L.A, London: Thames and Hudson, 1998.
- Oyobe, Natsu, Human Subjectivity and Confrontation with Materials in Japanese Art: Yoshihara Jiro and Early Years of the Gutai Art Association, 1947–1958, PhD dissertation, University of Michigan, 2005.
- Tiampo, Ming, Gutai and Informel Post-war art in Japan and France, 1945–1965. (Worldcat link: ) (Dissertation Abstracts International, 65-01A) ISBN 0-496-66047-0, ISBN 978-0-496-66047-6
- Tiampo, Ming, “Originality, Universality, and Other Modernist Myths”, Art and Globalization, eds. James Elkins, Zhivka Valiavicharska and Alice Kim, PLACE: Penn State Press, 2010, 166–170.
- Tiampo, Ming, Gutai: Decentering Modernism, London, Chicago: University of Chicago Press, 2011.
- Tiampo, Ming, “Cultural Mercantilism: Modernism’s Means of Production: The Gutai Group as Case Study”, Globalization and Contemporary Art, ed. Jonathan Harris, Wiley-Blackwell, 2011.
- Tiampo, Ming, "Gutai Chain: The Collective Spirit of Individualism", positions 21/2 (May 2013): 383–415.
- Visser, Mattijs, "Gutai. Mal communication", Making Worlds, exh. cat., 53rd International Art Exhibition, La Biennale di Venezia 2009; ISBN 978-88-317-9696-5
- Yamamoto, Atsuo, "L'espace, le temps, la scène et la peinture / Space, Time, Stage, Painting", Gutai. Moments de destruction, moments de beauté, eds. Atsuo Yamamoto, Ming Tiampo and Florence de Mèredieu, Paris: Blusson, 2002, 7–35.
- Yamamoto, Atsuo, "ZERO – Gutai– ZERO", nul=0, The Dutch Nul Group in an International Context, exh. cat., Stedelijk Museum Schiedam, NAi Publishers, Schiedam, 2011. Text without references: http://www.0-archive.info/gutai-by-atsuo-yamamoto.html
