= Sadamasa Motonaga =

Japanese painter (1922–2011)

Sadamasa Motonaga (元永定正, Motonaga Sadamasa, born November, 26, 1922, in Iga Ueno, died October 3, 2011, in Takarazuka) was a Japanese visual artist and book illustrator, and a first-generation member of the postwar Japanese artist group Gutai Art Association, Gutai for short.

Motonaga’s oeuvre, comprising paintings, objects, performances and stage art, ceramics, murals and installation artworks and picture books, is characterized by his humorous, enlivening (animating) use of biomorphic abstract shapes inspired by nature and manga cartoons, as well as the exploration of the materiality of color. He is most known for his ephemeral works from Gutai’s experimental exhibition projects, such as Liquid: Red and Works (Water) from 1955 and 1956, which used vinyl sheets and tubes filled with color-tinted water; his stage works from 1957 and 1958, which involved smoke as artistic material; and for his Informel-style paintings from the late 1950s that experimented with pouring liquid paint on to canvases.

Promoted by the French art critic Michel Tapié, who during the 1950s and 1960s attempted to establish Informel as a global movement, Motonaga became one of the few Gutai members who received international and national recognition as a solo artist beyond the Gutai context. He was offered a yearlong residency by the Japan Society in New York in 1966, during which he introduced airbrushing and a hard-edge style to his paintings. After leaving Gutai in 1971, Motonaga’s work again expanded beyond painting to ceramics, interior design, murals, and public performances and installation artworks, all of which he continuously developed around his signature-style of animated biomorphic shapes. The children's picture books, which Motonaga created in collaboration with the poet and translator Shuntarō Tanikawa beginning in 1970, became bestselling books.

He was married to graphic designer Etsuko Nakatsuji, with whom he also collaborated on reconstruction projects in the aftermath of the Great Hanshin earthquake in 1995.

== Biography ==
=== Early life ===
Born in Ueno (Mie Prefecture) in 1922 into a middle-class family, Motonaga, at an early age, aspired to become a manga cartoon artist. As a young adult he worked as a national railway employee and as a postal clerk while continuing to submit comic strips to magazines. In 1944, he began to study painting with Ueno-based painter Mankichi Hamabe. After the end of the Asian Pacific War, during which he worked for a munitions plant, Motonaga resumed painting and engaged in the local art scene in the Hanshin region. He began taking sketching and oil painting classes at the nearby Nishinomiya Art School, after relocating to Kobe-Uozaki in 1952, and in 1953 he began participating in the Ashiya City Art Association’s annual exhibitions. His early humorous biomorphic abstract paintings and objects made of everyday household materials were praised by the Association’s founding member and juror Jirō Yoshihara, who invited him in 1955 to join the Gutai Art Association (commonly known as Gutai), recently founded under his tutelage. Like many other Gutai members, Motonaga continued to participate in the Ashiya City Art Exhibitions.

=== Gutai Art Association, 1955–1971 ===
As a member of Gutai, Motonaga participated in most of the group’s exhibitions and projects, such as the Gutai journal, outdoor exhibitions, and stage shows, which resulted in a great number of radically experimental performances, paintings, and interactive installation works by the members. Motonaga continued to create humorous biomorphic abstract paintings and objects made of natural found objects that he covered with brightly colored paint, such as a group of stones covered with bright red, white and blue paint and adorned with wheat straws. For Gutai’s Experimental Outdoor Exhibition of Modern Art to Challenge the Mid-Summer Sun (1955), the 1st Gutai Art Exhibition (1955), and the Gutai Outdoor Art Exhibition (1956), Motonaga filled vinyl tubes with color-tinted water, which were hung from the trees or from the ceiling of the exhibition venues. At the Gutai Art on the Stage show in 1957, Motonaga publicly staged his performance Smoke, in which rings of smoke were blown out a wooden box into the air. At the 2nd Gutai Art on the Stage show in 1958, he combined the two, blowing the smoke into a giant vinyl tube.

Around 1957, Motonaga began to experiment with pouring liquid paint onto wet layers of paint, inspired by the tarashikomi technique in traditional Japanese painting. Motonaga used the dynamic and uncontrolled effects of this method in combination with his simple, biomorphic shapes, letting the paint overflow the contours of shapes and often applying pebbles to the canvas. Due to the apparent spontaneous gesturality of this method, Motonaga’s pouring paintings resonated with the Informel craze in Japan. In 1957, Gutai began collaborating with the French art critic Michel Tapié, who was promoting Informel and gestural abstract art as a global movement. In 1960, Motonaga was one of only a few members of the group to close a contract with the Martha Jackson Gallery in New York (whom Tapié advised) to provide paintings on a regular basis. Motonaga became recognized both nationally as well as internationally as an artist of his own, beyond Gutai, also via Tapié’s networks. He received an award at the 11th Premio Lissone Internazionale per la Pittura in 1959 and held his first solo show abroad at the Martha Jackson Gallery in New York in 1961. At the same time he also gave his first solo exhibition within Japan at the influential Tokyo Gallery. His works were included in most major international exhibitions of contemporary Japanese painting during this period. Motonaga was an influential member of Gutai, and his works were a fixture for Gutai; he also recruited so-called second and third generation Gutai members.

==== New York, 1966–1967 ====
In 1966, Motonaga moved to New York to take part in a Japan Society’s residency program, joined by his partner Etsuko Nakatsuji, whom he had met in 1957 and lived with in Takarazuka since 1962. During this almost year-long stay, he was introduced to New York’s art scene and befriended the Japanese translator, poet, and writer Shuntarō Tanikawa, a fellow invitee, who was also living at the Chelsea Hotel, as well as other Japanese New York-based artists such as Tadanori Yokoo, Yūji Takahashi and Toshi Ichiyanagi. While there, he explored new materials, techniques and styles in his painting, such as emulsion paints, spray-paint, airbrushing, and Liquitex acrylic paint.

Back in Japan, Motonaga continued to show his works in Gutai exhibitions and contributed to the group’s exhibition and performances at the Expo ’70 in Osaka, where he conceived several acts for the stage show Gutai Art Festival that used the effects of light and reflection of moving forms. Tired of quarrels between the members, Motonaga quit Gutai in 1971, only a few months before the group officially disbanded in the aftermath of Yoshihara’s death in 1972.

=== 1970s to 1980s ===
Motonaga continued to hold solo and group exhibitions throughout the 1970s, particularly in art spaces in the Kansai region. He expanded the range of his artistic production to ceramics, home furnishings (e.g. tapestries and chairs), murals, and installation artworks, which often included performative elements. He also began publishing picture books in collaboration with Tanikawa, who contributed onomatopoeic verses, while Motonaga provided illustrations with organic growth and movement of shapes as theme.

In the 1980s, Motonaga’s works were included in the increasing number of retrospective Gutai exhibitions in Europe, US, and Japan, for which the artist made reproductions of his early works, specifically his Water/Liquid works. His new works, however, turned from a hard-edge pop style painting towards a mixed language of plain graphic sign-like elements and design with painting elements. He taught at the Kyoto City University of Arts from 1982 until 1987.

=== Late life, 1990s to 2011 ===
In the 1990s, Motonaga continued to participate in and travel to the numerous retrospective Gutai exhibitions, but he also began to hold his own solo museum retrospective exhibitions, e.g., at the Mie Prefectural Museum of Art (1991) and the Otani Memorial Art Museum in Nishinomiya (2002). His paintings increasingly adopted large dimensions and mixed several artistic styles, genres, and techniques, such as airbrushing and drawing. In the aftermath of the Great Hanshin earthquake in 1995, which devastated their home region, Motonaga and Nakatsuji engaged in reconstruction and rehabilitation projects with public art and events for children, such as the monument Yume–Kizuna (Dreams–Bonds) in the Nagisa Park in Kobe in 2001. Motonaga taught at the Seian University of Art and Design beginning in 1996. He died in Takarazuka in 2011.

== Work ==
=== Early paintings and objects ===
Motonaga’s transition from early Fauvist paintings to abstract art around 1953 was fueled by his fascination with the abstract works shown at the Ashiya City Art Exhibition, and his subsequent exploration of simple biomorphic shapes, which he abstracted from nature and imported into his paintings and objects, adopting a humorous, playful visual language reminiscent of young children’s artworks. Inspired by the visual language of manga cartoons and by the phenomena of organic growth in nature and “nature’s generative power”, the plain shapes he created seemed to live and interact with each other. He always kept a notepad with him to sketch and collect shapes, which he later used in his works. Motonaga’s first abstract paintings, e.g., Treasure (1954), were inspired by the view of blinking neon-lights on the top of the Mount Maya.* Transcending the thresholds of art genres, he also created small bio- and anthropomorphic objects from natural and everyday materials such as the stones that he covered in bright red, white and blue paint and adorned with wheat straws and looked like peculiar living creatures, which he submitted to the Ashiya City Exhibition in 1953 and 1954, or his anthropomorphic assemblages from colander, wire and wood, or the nail studded wooden poles that he covered in red paint.

=== Water and smoke ===
For Gutai’s Experimental Outdoor Exhibition of Modern Art to Challenge the Mid-Summer Sun (1955) at the Ashiya Park, the 1st Gutai Art Exhibition at the Ohara Hall in Tokyo (1955), and the Gutai Outdoor Art Exhibition (1956), Motonaga filled vinyl sheets or tubes with color-tinted water, which were hung from the trees or from the ceiling of the exhibition venue. The glittering effect of the colored water moving with the air and light transformed the venue into “a living kaleidoscope”. These works anticipated installation and environmental artworks of the 1960s that used natural elements.

For Gutai’s photoshoot with LIFE magazine in April 1956, Motonaga constructed a wooden box with two holes, inside of which he ignited flares. By striking against the box, he created rings of smoke that were blown into the air. At the Gutai Art on the Stage show at the Sankei Halls in Osaka and Tokyo in 1957, his performance Smoke included smoke rings 20 inches in diameter and lit by colored lights. For the 2nd Gutai Art on the Stage show in 1958, Motonaga combined the elements of smoke and filled vinyl tubes by blowing the smoke into a giant vinyl tube. Photographs of Motonaga’s smoke works, which were published in the Gutai publications and included in Tapié’s book Continuité et avant-garde au Japon (1961), caught the attention of artists of the Dutch and German Nul and Zero groups, who at the time were experimenting with ephemeral and natural elements and effects and performative works, leading to their exhibition collaboration.*

=== Poured paint paintings ===
Around 1957, Motonaga, after discovering the effects of overflowing paint by accident, introduced this technique, also known in Japanese Nihonga painting as tarashikomi or traditional paper marbling, into his paintings by pouring liquid paint onto still wet layers of paint. He thus continued to explore the materiality of color and form by emphasizing the effects of gravity and fluidity on his paint. Motonaga often used this method, which he had learned from Hamabe, upon his clear-cut monochrome biomorphic shapes, whose contours were broken and dissolved, with the effect of resembling explosions of paint. He continued to develop his own style by replacing oil paint with synthetic resin pigments, which he used in combination with turpentine, applying pebbles onto the painting surface, and augmenting the flows by inclining the canvas. These works resonated with the trend of gesturally abstract Informel-style art in Japan in the mid-1950s, but, beyond the energetic visual effect of pouring paint, the procedure was not impetuous nor violent, but calm and controlled. However, Motonaga’s signature style of poured paint set the ground for his national and international recognition.

=== Airbrush paintings ===
During his artist residency in New York in 1966, Motonaga, lacking his regular materials, began to experiment with acrylic paint and airbrushing using canned spray. His paintings around this time adopted a hard-edge style by emphasizing the flatness of his clear-cut phallic shapes, of which the contours were shaded in colorful gradations to produce the dynamic effect of glowing or shining. By also incorporating almost-figurative shapes and landscape-like elements such as grounds, mountains, and flames to his paintings, Motonaga’s paintings from the mid-1960s shifted towards a more cartoon-like visual language to suggest his shapes to move and interact with each other.

=== Mix of styles, late 1970s to 2000s ===
Since the late 1970s, Motonaga, whose works continued to develop around the lives of his organic shapes, combined his diverse painting techniques, which he had explored separately until then, such as pouring, spraying, splashing, and drawing. The formal composition of his works became complex as he added more and more shapes and pictorial elements, which overlapped in multiple layers. He also resumed to extend his work beyond painting by creating ceramics, home furnishings (e.g. tapestries and chairs), performances, murals, and installation artworks, including commissions for public buildings.

In the 1990s the energetic intensity of his works achieved by his mix of methods and styles were amplified by Motonaga’s choice of large dimensions, by which he again expanded painting to performance, environmental and interactive installation art. After his home region was hit by the Great Hanshin earthquake in 1995, Motonaga and Nakatsuji engaged in reconstruction and rehabilitation projects by creating public art and events for children, including the seaside monument Yume–Kizuna (Dreams–Bonds) in the Nagisa Park in Kobe in 2001. In his presentation of his painting Colored Balls, Five Pieces, White (2002), colored wooden balls that corresponded in size and color to the dots in the four paintings hung at the wall, spread on the floor of the exhibition space.

=== Picture books ===
Beginning in 1970, Motonaga published over 20 picture books, among them Koro koro koro (1984), Gacha gacha don don (1990). The picture book Moko moko moko (1977) in collaboration with Tanikawa tells the story of organically shaped individual characters interacting with each other and transforming. Tanikawa provided short rhythmic onomatopoeic verses alongside Motonaga’s illustrations and continues to be a best-seller even today. Motonaga also created picture books in collaboration with composer and writer Yōsuke Yamashita and translator Hisao Kanaseki, but also provided a great number of book covers designs.

== Awards ==
- 1983 Japan Art Grand Prize
- 1986 Hyogo Prefecture Cultural Award
- 1988 Chevalier des Arts et des Lettres
- 1991 Medal with Purple Ribbon
- 1992 Osaka Culture Prize
- 1997 Order of the Rising Sub, Gold Rays with Rosette
- 2002 Mie Prefecture Cultural Encouragement Award
