= Takesada Matsutani =

Japanese painter (born 1937)

- Born: 1937 (age 88–89); Osaka, Japan
- Movement: Gutai Art Association

Takesada Matsutani (松谷 武判, Matsutani Takesada; born January 1, 1937 in Osaka, Japan) is a Japanese avant-garde artist based in Paris and Nishinomiya. Active as a painter since the 1950s, Matsutani's practice has also included object-based sculpture, printmaking and installation. Matsutani was a member of the Gutai Art Association from 1963 until its dissolution in 1972. Gutai leader Jirō Yoshihara prioritized artistic innovation and originality, a lesson that has remained with the artist throughout his career.

Since 1961, Matsutani has used wood glue, what was then a newly available material in post-war Japan, to create organic forms on the surface of the canvas. Fascinated by the variety of evocative shapes that revealed themselves through his manipulation of the glue mixed with paint, the artist regularly returned to these biomorphic forms across a variety of mediums and styles, even adapting them to the context of hard-edge painting in the 1970s.

After receiving a scholarship to study for six months in Paris in 1966, Matsutani chose to settle there permanently. Throughout the late 1960s and 1970s, he worked primarily as a printmaker. Since the late 1970s, in parallel to his painting practice, Matsutani has been using graphite and paper as the base for large-scale installations, entitled Streams. These works, finalized by a performance of the artist in situ, explore time, energy and transformation in muted tones of black and white.

Matsutani's works are represented in a large number of art museums and collections around the world. In 2002 the artist, who has lived a large part of his childhood in Nishinomiya, received the Nishinomiya City Cultural Award.

== Biography ==
=== Early life and career ===
Matsutani was born in Osaka in 1937. His interest for the visual arts developed early on, as illustrated by a relatively sophisticated watercolor landscape painting he completed in 1950, when he was only thirteen. While the artist maintains that he had a "regular upbringing after the Second World War", he contracted tuberculosis in 1951, a debilitating illness he battled on and off for eight years.

In 1954, his condition stabilized and he was admitted to Osaka Municipal High School of Industrial Arts (Ōsaka Shiritsu Kogei Gakkō) in 1954, where he studied nihonga, traditional Japanese painting. Two years later, he fell seriously ill and was forced to drop out of school and remain in the confines of the hospital and his home. He sketched that which was in his immediate surroundings, notably his plants and his pets, which included a dog, a cat and a bird.

Unable to officially complete his studies, Matsutani took drawing classes organized by the Nishinomiya City Art Association, where he studied under artists like the abstract calligraphers Waichi Tsutaka and Suda Kokuta. In 1957, he submitted a landscape painting, The Rock's Surface, to the nihonga section of the 8th Nishinomiya City Exhibition. The entry was accepted and attracted the attention of artist juror Shosaku Arao, who invited him to visit his atelier. They soon developed a student-teacher relationship.

Arao, whose cubist style was becoming progressively more abstract, encouraged Matsutani to experiment with abstraction. Matsutani recalls that Arao "seemed to be attempting to find an honest way to express his interior 'image'." At this time, Matsutani was also an avid reader and interested in new currents in contemporary art around the world. He subscribed to the Japanese art magazine Bijutsu Techo, and read translated collections of essays. He notes that he was particularly impressed by Kandinsky's Point and Line to Plane.

In the late 1950s, Matsutani produced a series of paintings that, although remaining figurative, employed a more expressionist style and incorporated abstract elements. One such painting is 1959's Life-B, in which a simplified, elongated figure appears to be running forward, arms above his head in a celebratory pose. An abstract shape painted behind the figure appears like a pair of outstretched wings. Matsutani's experimentation was not only pictural but material: for this painting, he mixed sand into his nihonga pigments. The artist has said that the source for such works was the anguish he felt during his years of solitude and illness: "I outwardly expressed my inner conflict and attempted to brush aside this heavy burden. In such ways, I shifted from realism to abstraction via my own interior 'image'."

=== Participation in Gutai ===
Matsutani was aware of the Gutai Art Association (具体美術協会, Gutai Bijutsu Kyōkai, or, short, Gutai) as early as 1956, but explains that he "really felt at odds with this group that was all the rage in Kansai". Admitting that he was initially "disenchanted" by Gutai, whose diverse avant-garde actions were considered by many at the time as bizarre or frivolous, he became first interested in the group thanks to his discussions with Gutai member Sadamasa Motonaga, whom he first met through his Nishinomiya community art classes. Matsutani soon would abandon figurative painting altogether and adopt an Art Informel style, citing Jean Fautrier as one important influence. He developed the materiality of his paintings by using a variety of media, including oils and acrylics, sand and cement, and creating rich, textured surfaces.

Although Matsutani's work was included in Gutai exhibitions from 1959 onwards, this did not grant the young artist entry into the group. Jirō Yoshihara, a local artist and Gutai's sole leader, had steadfastly proclaimed since the group's formation that Gutai artists were to "create what [had] never been done before". Thus, Yoshihara expressed little interest in Matsutani's art informel-influenced canvases, telling the artist that "this kind of thing already exists".

==== Works made with glue ====
Confronted by the challenge of creating something original enough to impress Yoshihara, Matsutani reflected on the type of artwork he wished to make: "I wanted to do something organic, something three-dimensional. Something that would have volume and hang like icicles or stalactites." Matsutani also cites as inspiration the experience of seeing cell samples under a microscope, thanks to a friend in medical school.

In 1961, the artist began experimenting with polyvinyl acetate glue, commonly known as wood glue or Elmer's glue in the United States, a new product available in post-war Japan. The artist dripped glue onto the surface of the canvas, which he then proceeded to turn over and let dry. He recounts that, as it was a windy day, the glue dried in unexpected patterns: "some parts ended up looking like blisters and others took on a transparent nipple-shaped form [...] My sensibilities towards organic forms that existed deep within my consciousness had been awakened." The artist, mixing vinyl glue with paint, would also blow into the forms created by the glue, inflating them, creating bulges on the canvas that sometimes popped open.

Matsutani showed his new works to members of Gutai, who encouraged him to present them to Yoshihara. Yoshihara was indeed pleased, and Matsutani was officially granted membership to Gutai in 1963. Matsutani had his first solo exhibition in October of that same year at the Gutai Pinacotheca, a converted warehouse in Nakanoshima, Osaka, that served as an exhibition space.

Matsutani's works with glue call to mind the human body with suggestions of both violence and sexual reproduction. His first works with glue employed rounded, bruise-like forms in blues, purples and greens. The three-dimensionality of the new material, with its folds and ripples rising from the surface, evokes flesh and pustules. For his first solo exhibition, Matsutani presented a series of paintings with a contrasting color palette of whites and reds that mimic skin and blood. French art historian Germaine Viatte commented that "there reigned [in the exhibition] a random violence in the hatching of these incised forms, painted on the inside with a raw red."

The openings, swellings and flesh tones of Matsutani's works lend themselves just as easily to erotic interpretation, of which Matsutani is aware: "At the time, a lot of people were repelled. Even now, women often say so. They say it looks like buttocks, or genitals, or the belly of a pregnant woman." Sexual references abound in many of Matsutani's paintings from this period, such as Work '65, in which sperm cell-like forms appear to swim towards a white opening in the shape of a vulva. Other paintings, like Work 66 Life, with its egg-like form and yolky center, bring to mind an embryo at its earliest stages. Art historian Jean-Michel Bouhours has also commented upon the "powerful analogies" between semen and vinyl glue.

Gutai specialist Ming Tiampo has characterized the singularity of Matsutani's production during the 1960s as "[contesting] the legacy of abstract expressionism and Art Informel, but also [resisting] what he retrospectively characterized as the 'dry' quality of American hard-edged painting and minimalism."

Although Matsutani relocated to Paris in 1966, he continued to participate in Gutai exhibitions by sending prints made in France to his fellow artists. His participation ceased in 1972 with the disbanding of the group after Yoshihara's death.

=== Relocation to Paris ===
While Germaine Viatte recounts that Matsutani had never thought to leave Japan, he found himself awarded in 1966 a scholarship to study for six months in Paris after having entered a contest organized by the Mainichi Shinbun and the Institut Frano-Japonais of Kyoto. Matsutani arrived in Paris without any desire to enroll at either the Sorbonne or the École des Beaux-Arts, and only signed up for obligatory French language courses. Instead, after visiting the Parisian museums, he asked himself: "where does this culture and this approach to life come from? Where is its past?" and took off traveling for a month, visiting Egypt, Greece and Italy.

Matsutani ceased working with glue upon his arrival in Paris, but soon hoped to begin artmaking again. He gravitated towards Atelier 17, the studio of the printmaker Stanley William Hayter, whose prints he had seen as a high-schooler in Japan and had deeply moved him. Hayter welcomed the young artist, who had little experience with printmaking. Nonetheless, he proceeded to create numerous copperplate prints, building upon his fascination for organic forms. The Propagation print series of 1967 reveals itself as a graphic extension of Matsutani's paintings with glue, presenting a black-and-white universe of cells in transformation.

Once Matsutani's six-month scholarship ended, he elected to stay in France and continue working at Hayter's studio, making a living for a while as a dishwasher at a Japanese restaurant, but soon becoming Hayter's assistant. He stayed at Atelier 17 for four more years, working punctually for other artists, such as Kumi Sugai, a celebrated Japanese printmaker based in Paris. In 1970, the artist left Atelier 17 and began working at the silkscreen studio of printmakers Lorna Taylor and Kate Van Houten, who he would later marry.

Matsutani focused on printmaking for a large part of the 1970s as he continued to experiment with new styles. At the beginning of the decade, the artist lived briefly in New York with his wife, a period during which he was exposed to hard-edge painting that was prevalent in Chelsea galleries of the time. Upon his return to Paris, he produced several hard-edge paintings that, despite the change in style, maintained the artist's interest in organic forms. Art historian Izumi Nakajima described how Matsutani's flat shapes "swell like rice cakes and expand into other color sections and off the rectangular shape of the frame. Although the works preserve their flatness with their form, the image betrays the flat universe to suggest concepts of gravity, movement and volume."

Nakajima highlights Matsutani's affinity for American painter Ellsworth Kelly, who had at one time lived in Paris, and whose work departed conceptually from minimalism as Kelly "sought to achieve abstract, conceptual and spiritual forms". Nakajima remarks that "the hard-edge paintings of Kelly and Matsutani have been understood as paintings that provide room for psychological connections."

=== Stream works and recent painting ===
In 1976, Matsutani returned to the simplest of materials, paper and graphite pencil, with the desire to renew his artistic practice while still embracing, in the words of the artist, "the spirit of Gutai", which had consistently pushed the artist to challenge himself. The artist recalls:

Rather than sketching as I had done before, I wanted to see what sort of 'surface' would emerge out of an accumulation of repeated pencil line strokes. Sure enough, a surface with a tone of black unlike oil painting or sumi ink made an appearance. As each line was drawn by hand, the angle of the light against it would show or hide the traces of the pencil marks and the shades of graphite [...] I promised myself I would keep on drawing until the surface turns black.

What began as small-scale graphite drawings soon became monumental. In 1977, Matsutani created the works Stream-1 and Stream-2 using a ten-meter long roll of paper, meticulously drawing the long bands, layer upon layer, gradually blackening the paper. The artist's final gesture is to pour white spirit or turpentine onto the band's end, liquifying the graphite and creating an expressive cascade of black that drips down the walls to the ground. As art historian Valérie Douniaux has noted, "the Streams are like existence itself, sometimes peaceful, sometimes tempestuous." Importantly, this moment of finalization is done in situ, adding a performative element to the pieces.

Since the early 1980s, the Stream works have taken on a variety of forms, and have grown more site-specific. They have been installed in both traditional exhibition sites like galleries and museums, as well as religious spaces, like temples, chapels and churches. Matsutani has introduced elements such as stones, crossbeams, sacks of water, cloth, and sumi ink. While the artist's performances vary, the artist's presence makes aware the flow of black graphite, confirming that the piece is "in a process of becoming and perpetual transformation".

The Stream works, with their poignant use of black and intense, meditative procedure, have proved rich for interpretation. Many see the series as a reconnection to the artist's Japanese origins, which the artist expressed a newfound interest for during the 1970s. There is the evident link between black and sumi ink, used for calligraphy. The artist also expressed the significance of seeing 16th century painter Tōhaku Hasegawa's Pine Trees Screen during a visit to Japan, an ink-on-paper work depicting Japanese pine trees in the mist, which "inspired [Matsutani] with a clear vision of what he himself hoped to achieve". Commenting on Matsutani's repetitive practice in creating the long bands of black graphite, and noting that Buddhism "had been a central element in Matsutani's education since his childhood," art historian Christine Macel states that "Matsutani is close to Zen [Buddhism's] precepts, even though he does not practice it."

And yet, Izumi Nakajima argues that "it would be somewhat simplistic to consider Stream [...] to be a return to tradition". There is also a strong metaphysical element to such works. Germaine Viatte notes that in the late 1970s, the artist reached middle age and, logically, "time invited itself into Matsutani's art". Toshio Yamanashi importantly adds: "The depth of darkness represents not only the thickness of accumulated pencil lines, but also the sedimentation of time, and the marks the artist makes to confirm he is alive. Inherent in the deep density of black is the living pulse of the artist, who has dedicated himself to the black material."

In parallel to his large-scale Stream installations, Matsutani has never ceased to create paintings with glue, continuously exploring the endless variations that this singular material provides. He began applying graphite to the forms in glue in the late 1970s, creating shadow-like variations upon the canvas that he related to the ideas about beauty and light shared by Jun'ichirō Tanizaki in his essay In Praise of Shadows. While for many years Matsutani's palette remained principally black and white, since 2013 the artist has begun employing exuberant shades of yellow, green and blue.

== Selected solo exhibitions ==
- 1963: Takesada Matsutani, Gutai Pinacotheca, Osaka, Japan
- 1967: Matsutani, The Art of Plastic, Shinanobashi Gallery, Osaka, Japan
- 1968: Takesada Matsutani, Galerie Zunini, Paris, France
- 1971: Takesada Matsutani, Station Gallery, Tokyo, Japan
- 1976: De l’objet à l’image sérigraphique, Galerie Eiko, Paris, France
- 1976: Takesada Matsutani, Galerie Watari, Tokyo, Japan
- 1978: Matsutani. Perspectives Japonaises, Galerie Alain Oudin, Paris, France
- 1978: Takesada Matsutani, Works on Paper, Gallery Don Soker-Kaseman/Upstairs Gallery, San Francisco, United States
- 1979: Takesada Matsutani, Gallery Marina Dinkler, Berlin, Germany
- 1980: Takesada Matsutani, Gallery S-65, Aalst, Belgium
- 1980: Takesada, Matsutani, Gallery Heide Hildebrand, Klagenfurt, Austria
- 1981: Enpitsu ni yoru kuro no sekai [Un monde noir au crayon], Gallery Kaneko Art, Tokyo, Japan
- 1982: Takesada Matsutani, Wetering Gallery, Amsterdam, Netherlands
- 1982: Works on Paper, Gallery Don Soker-Kaseman, San Francisco, United States.
- 1983: Today's Artists No. 12: Matsutani Takesada 1981-83, Osaka Contemporary Art Center, Osaka, Japan
- 1985: Stream, Galerie Monochrome, Aachen, Germany
- 1986: Takesada Matsutani, Contemporary Art Center, Honolulu, United States.
- 1988: Takesada Matsutani: peintures, installations, Pablo Neruda Contemporary Art Center, Corbeil-Essonnes, Franc
- 1989: Searching for a New Trend in Contemporary Art, Art Space Baku, Fukuoka, Japan
- 1992: Matsutani Stream-Ashiya-92, City Museum of Art and History, Ashiya, Japan
- 1993: Takesada Matsutani: Works from the 1960s to Today, Ôtani Memorial Art Museum, Nishinomiya, Japan
- 1998: Matsutani. Action-Temps-Espace, Fondation DANAE – Diffusion Attitudes Nouvelles Art et Espaces, Jarnac, France
- 1999: Matsutani's Prints, 1960-1988, City Museum of Art and History, Ashiya, Japan
- 2000: Matsutani Waves, Otani Memorial Art Museum, Nishinomiya, Japan
- 2002: Takesada Matsutani, Cairns Regional Gallery, Australia
- 2007: Matsutani–rétrospective, Centre culturel André Malraux, Agen, France
- 2007: Takesada Matsutani, Gendaikko Museum, Miyazaki, Japan
- 2010: Matsutani Takesada. Stream, Museum of Modern Art, Kamakura, Japan
- 2013: Takesada Matsutani. A Matrix, Gallery Hauser & Wirth, Londres, UK
- 2015: Matsutani - Currents, Otani Memorial Art Museum, Nishinomiya, Japan
- 2018: Takesada Matsutani, Japan House, São Paulo, Brazil
- 2019: Takesada Matsutani, Retrospective, Centre Pompidou, Paris, France
- 2020: Takesada Matsutani : estampes, 1967-1977, Les Abattoirs, Toulouse, France

== Selected group exhibitions ==
- 1957: 8th Nishinomiya City Exhibition, Yasui Elementary School, Nishinomiya, Japan
- 1960: 9th Gutai Exhibition, Takashimaya Department Store, Osaka, Japan
- 1962: Inaugural Exhibition of the Gutai Pinacotheca, Osaka, Japan.
- 1965: Groupe Gutai, Galerie Stadler, Paris, France / Mickery Arthous, Loenersloot, The Netherlands / Kölnischer Kunstverein, Cologne, Germany
- 1966: NUL 1966 Art Exhibition (Nul Negentienhonderd zesenzestig), International Gallery, Olez, The Hague, the Netherlands
- 1968: 1st International print biennale, City museum of modern art, Paris, France.
- 1968: Internationale Grafik Ausstellung, Europahaus, Vienna, Austria.
- 1968: 1st British International Print Biennale, Cartwright Hall Art Gallery, Bradford, United Kingdom
- 1969: 25 Artists from Atelier 17, Museum of Modern Art / Negev Museum, Haifa / Beer-Shava, Israël
- 1969: 9-kai Gendai Nihon Bijutsu ten [9th Exhibition of Japanese Contemporary Art], Museum of Contemporary Art, Tokyo, Japan
- 1969: International Exhibition of Graphic Arts, Modern Art Gallery, Ljubljana, Slovenia
- 1969: Gendai bijutsu no douko [Trends in Contemporary Art], National Museum of Modern Art, Kyoto, Japan
- 1970: Exhibition at the entrance of Expo ’70 Midori Pavilion by the Gutai Group, Osaka, Japan
- 1970: International Print Exhibition, Brooklyn Museum, New York, United States
- 1970: 2e Biennale internationale de l’estampe, City Modern Art Museum, Paris France
- 1970: 1st American Print Biennale, National Museum of Fine Arts, Santiago, Chili
- 1971: 10th Contemporary Japanese paintings exhibition, Museum of Contemporary Art, Tokyo / City Museum of Art, Kyoto / Cultural Center, Aichi, Japan
- 1971: 42nd Northwest Printmakers International Exhibition, Seattle Art Museum, Seattle, United States.
- 1972: Ibiza Biennale of Graphic Arts '72, Museum of Contemporary Art, Ibiza, Spain
- 1974: Contemporary Japanese Print Exhibition, Museum of Modern Art, Mexico City, Mexico.
- 1975: 2nd Miami International Print Biennal, The Metropolitan Museum and Art Center, Miami, United States
- 1979: Yoshihara Jiro to Gutai no sonogo [Jirô Yoshihara and Today's Aspects of Gutai], Hyôgo Prefecture Museum of Modern Art, Kobe, Japan
- 1981: Art Now 1970-1980, Hyôgo Prefecture Museum of Modern Art, Kobe, Japan
- 1982: 9th International Print Biennal, Ekspozycja Pavillon, Krakow, Poland
- 1983: 1st Chinese International Print Exhibition, Taipei Fine Art Museum, Taiwan
- 1984: 6th European Print Biennal, Musée de l’impression sur étoffes, Mulhouse, France
- 1984: 10th International Print Biennal, Narodowe Museum, Krakow, Poland
- 1985 :Endai-hanga no kiseki [Trajectory of Contemporary Prints], Fukushima Prefectural Museum of Art, Japan
- 1985: Gravure, grands formats [Engraving, Large Formats], City Museum of Modern Art, Liège, Belgium
- 1985: Grupo Gutai: Pintura y Acción [Gutai Group: Painting and Action], Spanish Museum of Contemporary Art, Madrid, Spain / Savremene Umernosti Museum, Belgrade, Yugoslavia / Hyôgo Prefecture of Modern Art, Kobe, Japan
- 1986: 10th International Exhibition of Original Drawings, Moderna Galerija, Rijeka, Croatia
- 1986: Gendai no shiro to kuro [Black & White Today], Museum of Modern Art, Saitama, Japan.
- 1986: 11th International Print Biennal, Ekspozycja Pavillon, Krakow, Poland
- 1987: Japon Passé-Present, Centre de la Vieille Charité / Musée Cantini, Marseille, France
- 1990: Giappone all’avanguardia, il Gruppo Gutai negli anni Cinquanta, Galleria Nazionale d'Arte Moderna, Roma, Italy
- 1990: Gutai: Mikan no zenei shudan [Gutai: The Avant-Garde Group Unfinished], Shôtô Art Museum, Tokyo, Japan.
- 1991: Kaiga no bokenshatachi "Gutai" [Adventurers of Painting "Gutai"], Art Museum, Fukuoka, Japan
- 1992: Gutai bijutsu kyokai no sakkatachi [Artists of Gutai Art Association], Miyagi Prefecture Museum of Art, Sendai, Japan
- 1993: Gutai II: 1959–1965, City Museum of Art and History, Ashiya, Japan
- 1993: Gutai III: 1965–1972, City Museum of Art and History, Ashiya, Japan
- 1993: Challenge of Art After the War: Jiro Yoshihara and the Gutai Group, Ehime Prefecture Art Museum, Matsuyama, Japan
- 1994: Kansai no bijutsu [Kansai Art 1950–1970], Hyôgo Prefecture Museum of Modern Art, Kobe, Japan
- 1994: Jikan/Bijutsu: 20-seiki bijutsu ni okeru jikan no hyôgen [Time in Contemporary Art], Modern Art Museum, Shiga, Japan
- 1996: Relaciones, 10 artists from 3 continents, Museo de Arte y Diseño Contemporaneo, San José, Costa Rica
- 1996: Hanga no 1970-nendai [Prints of the 1970s], Shoto Art Museum, Tokyo, Japan.
- 1996: Chimériques polymères, le plastique dans l’art contemporain, Modern Art Museum, Nice, France
- 1996: Sengo-bijutsu no danmen ten Hyogo-kenritsu-bijutsukan-shozo Yamamura korekushon kara [Post-War Art from the Yamamura Collection in the Hyôgo Prefectural Museum of Modern Art], City Museum of Art, Chiba, Japan
- 1997: Juryoku-Sengo bijutsu no zahyo-jiku [Gravity – Axis of Contemporary Art], The National Museum of Art, Osaka, Japan
- 1998: Artistes japonais à Paris, Japanese cultural House in Paris (French: Maison de la culture du Japon à Paris), France
- 1998: New Prints of Europe, Guangdong Art Museum, Guangdong, China
- 1999: Gutai, Galerie nationale du Jeu de Paume, Paris, France
- 1999: Gendai-Hanga. 21-nin no houko: Genda-hanga nyûmon [The Axis of 21 printers in Japan – Introduction to 20th Century Prints], National Art Museum, Osaka, Japan
- 2000: Sugai Kumi, S.W. Hayter, Matsutani Takesada, Musée Gendaikko, Miyazaki, Japan
- 2002: Gutai bijutsu kyokai no sakka Korekushon kikaku ni yoru [From the Collection: Artists of the Gutai Group], Miyagi Museum of Art, Sendai, Japan
- 2004: Ano atsui jidai me o samasu! Kessei 50-shunen kinen Gutai kaiko-ten [Gutai Retrospective Exhibition: 50th Anniversary], Hyogo Prefectural Museum of Art, Kobe, Japan
- 2004: Hanga: Tozai-koryu no nami [Hanga: Waves of East-West Cultural Interchange], University of Arts Museum, Tokyo, Japan
- 2006: Peintures et Performances, Takesada Matsutani & Germain Rosez, Espace Arsenal, Metz, France.
- 2007: Resounding Spirit, Japanese Contemporary Art of the 1960s, The Gibson Gallery Collection and Live Art Festival, Carleton University Art Gallery, Ottawa, Canada
- 2007: L’Arte e il Torchio [Art and the Printing Press], Museo civico ala Ponzone, Cremone, Italy
- 2008: Taiwan International Invitational Mini-Prints and Mini Drawings Exhibition, NINU Gallery, Taipei, Taiwan
- 2010: Katachi no chikara Kodo-keizai-seicho no bijutsu hen-Osaka-shiritsu-kindai-bijutsukan korekushon o chushin ni [Power of Form: Japanese Contemporary Art of the 1950s and 1960s from the Collection of the Osaka City Museum of Modern Art], City Museum of Art, Osaka, Japan
- 2010: Hirogaru Imagination [Broaden Your Imagination], City Museum, Riverwalk Gallery, Kitakyûshû Japan
- 2010: Daremo yaranai koto wo yare! [Do Something No One's Ever Done Before!], Kwansei Gakuin University Museum Planning Space, Nishinomiya, Japan
- 2010: Collection 3 Nihon Bijutsu [Japanese Art] 1950 – 2010, National Museum of Art, Osaka, Japan
- 2011: The Spirit of Gutai, Horio and Matsutani, Galerie Friedrich Müller, Frankfurt, Germany
- 2012: Gutai: The Spirit of an Era, National Arts Center, Tokyo, Japan
- 2012: A Visual Essay on Gutai, Hauser & Wirth Gallery, New York, United States
- 2012: Taiwa suru bijutsu / Zenei no Kansai [Artistic Interactions: Avant-garde Kansai], Otani Memorial Art Museum, Nishinomiya, Japan
- 2012: Karuizawa no kaze ten-Nippon no gendai-ato 1950-ima [Wind of Karuizawa: Japanese Contemporary Art 1950-2012], Karuizawa New Art Museum, Karuizawa, Japan
- 2013:The Collection: Gutai yakushin [The progression of Gutai], City Museum of Art and History, Ashiya, Japan
- 2013: Parallel Views: Italian and Japanese Art from the 1950s, 60s and 70s, Collection Rachofsky, The Warehous, Dallas, United States
- 2013: Gutai: Splendid Playground, Solomon R. Guggenheim Museum, New York, United States
- 2013: Korekushon hanga ten [Collection of Prints]: Sugai Kumi/Matsutani Takesada, City Museum of Art and History, Ashiya, Japan
- 2015: Nouvelle présentation des collections modernes (1905-1965), Centre Pompidou, Paris, France
- 2017: Viva Arte Viva, 57th Venice Biennal, Venice, Italy
- 2018: Gutai, L'espace et le temps, Musée Soulages, Rodez, France
