= List of Legendz characters =

This is a list of characters from the Japanese multimedia franchise Legendz.

== Humans ==
Shuzo "Shu" Matsutani (シュウゾウ・マツタニ, Shūzō Matsutani)

- Voiced by: Akemi Okamura

He's the "Kaze no Saga" or "Saga of Wind". A very absent-minded, irresponsible 11-year-old boy who loves baseball (which he's bad at) and cute girls (which upsets Meg greatly). Shu seems to be an unlikely hero but proves his worth in the later episodes. His Legendz is Shiron the Windragon.

Meg Sprinkle (メグ・スプリンクル, Megu Supurinkuru)

- Voiced by: Megumi Nasu

She's the "Mizu no Saga" or "Saga of Water". A pink-haired girl who is a friend of Shu. Her Legendz is Zuou the Bigfoot. Originally, she was comfortable with the idea of Legendz existing (normally Shiron hanging around with the kids) but as the series progresses, Meg begins to develop an intense dislike of them and fighting, because she feels that those are ruining the normal life she and her friends once had; she also admits to Legendz being physically frightening. She has a tendency to take pictures of people and things. Her most noteworthy trait is that she possesses a great deal of common sense among the three friends. As an intended running gag throughout the anime, whenever Shu does something that irritates Meg to the limit of her patience, she delivers her "Meg Chop" to Shu's head (in one case, she has used the chop on the Maze Octopus "Rapper King").

Mike "Mac" McField ("マック", マイク・マクフィールド, "Makku", Maiku Makufīrudo)

- Voiced by: Masami Suzuki

The "Saga of Earth". An obese boy who likes hamburgers and is a very perceptive friend of Shu and of most situations the group gets into. His Legendz is Garion the Griffin. Mac is very kind and isn't particularly upset by anything. He possesses a verbal tic that has him say "you know" at the end of nearly every sentence.

Dino Sparks (ディーノ・スパークス, Dino Supākusu)

- Voiced by: Omi Minami

The "Saga of Fire". A rich, but lonely boy who always carries a rose with him. His Legendz is Greedo the Blazedragon. Despite his status as a wealthy person, he is not arrogant or looks down on others as most stereotypical upper class are portrayed. He is very bitter towards his father and accuses of him of being the reason his mother left.

Halca Hepburn (ハルカ・ヘップバーン, Haruka Heppubān)

- Voiced by: Yuriko Fuchizaki

A 25-year-old woman who has a life-long interest in all Legendz. She also fronts as a teacher at Shu's school. Her life is deeply entwined with Legendz more than she knows. She is particularly infatuated with Shiron, whom she flips out around every time he appears. At one point, she professes she is in love with Shiron. She spends a lot of her time researching her father's old books, where she discovers some startling and dark secrets about Legendz. Later in the anime (around episode 20) she joins forces with Ranshiin trying to stop the children (the sagas) and their legendz from being together.

BB/Bouchou

- Voiced by: Yuri Amano

A purple-haired woman sent to retrieve the Wind Talispod from Shu. Though she works hard to steal it from him, she is not an unkind person as seen later on. She eventually comes to question the methods of DWC and quits, along with J1 and J2. Her actual name is Bunny Brookmeyer, as revealed in Episode 46.

J1 and J2

- Voiced by: Eiji Takemoto (J1) and Tsuyoshi Maeda (J2)

Two agents who work under BB. They are referred to as J1 and J2 as they have the same name "Jack Johnson".

President of DWC

- Voiced by: Takashi Matsuyama

A small, pitiful man who "controls" DWC in place of the CEO. He is constantly bullied and intimidated by Ranshiin in just about every episode they are together, most often due to either Ranshiin being unhappy with the electric fans he uses to air himself or because of the constant failures to retrieve Shu's Talispod.

Sasuke Matsutani (サスケ・マツタニ, Sasuke Matsutani)

- Voiced by: Hiroyuki Sawada

Shu's dad who works at DWC. He gives Shu the Wind Talispod. A seemingly typical Japanese father who just wants his son to be happy.

Yoko Matsutani (ヨウコ・マツタニ, Yōko Matsutani)

- Voiced by: Yuri Amano

Shu's mother. Despite a seemingly minor role in the anime, her involvement in the story becomes deeper toward the end after getting hit by Jabberwock's dark crystal and crystalizes, much to Shu's shock and regret. However later she returns to normal after Jabberwock's defeat. Much like Shu's father, she simply wants Shu to be happy with things.

Bruno Sparks (ブルーノ・スパークス, Burūno Supākusu)

- Voiced by: Kouji Ishii

Dino's father, who was the president of the Duck Mind Company. He and Sasuke develop the Talisdam, an upgrade of the Talispod, with three Soul Doll docking bays.

== Legendz ==
Shiron the Windragon (シロン, Shiron)

- Voiced by: Kazuhiko Inoue

A wind-type Legendz who can't remember his past. His attack is "Wing Tornado". The main Legendz character. He is fond of windy days and is actually quite social, despite the fact he spends a great deal of his time in his lesser form, a hamster-like animal (nicknamed "Nezuccho" or 'ねずっちょ') that can't say anything beyond that of "ga ga ga." During parts of episodes, Shiron's form is also mistaken for a "white mouse" or "white mouse with wings". Shuu's Legendz.

Greedo the Blazedragon (グリードー, Gurīdo)

- Voiced by: Yoshiyuki Yamaguchi

A fire-type Legendz, he transforms into a rose which Dino takes around with him. Greedo is part of a three-Legendz team called G-W-Nicole. Despite his rebel appearance and tough personality he slowly grows to befriend Dino and is actually quite friendly. He is a stark contrast to Dino in many ways. It is eventually revealed that he had lost his previous Saga in the past because of Killbeat the Bicorn, and as such does not want to endanger the life of another soul he believes he won't be able to protect, causing him to push Dino away for a time.

Wolfy the Werewolf (ウォルフィ, Whorufi)

- Voiced by: Yuto Nakano

Earth-type Legendz. A member of Greedo's group, G-W-Nicole.

Leon the Manticore (リーオン, Rīon)

- Voiced by: Tsuyoshi Maeda

Wind-type Legendz. A member of Greedo's group, G-W-Nicole.

Garion the Griffin (ガリオン, Garion)

- Voiced by: Mika Doi

An earth-type Legendz. Wise and powerful, frightening when provoked, she can be set in her ways. She was sealed away inside her saga's body. Mac's Legendz.

Zuou the Bigfoot (ズオウ, Zuou)

- Voiced by: Ayaka Saito

A water-type Legendz (though his attacks actually consist of ice and snow). He is young and naïve, but cares for Meg and will protect her at all costs, despite Meg's initial desire for him to stay away from her. Meg's Legendz.

Ranshiin (ランシーン, Ranshīn)

- Voiced by: Kazuhiko Inoue

A mysterious black-winged Windragon who seems to be the one in true control of DWC (he bullies and intimidates the President of the company constantly) and has an interest in Shiron as he is very similar to him. Shiron isn't as bad-hearted or superior in every way as Ranshiin is and loses every fight with him. He is malevolent, aggressive, black-hearted, psychopathic, and spends his time harassing, teasing, and bullying the president of DWC or Shiron. He seems to be rather easily annoyed by the lack of wind where he's staying and uses electrical fans often. Ranshiin is physically and mentally an antithesis to Shiron in every way. The idea of him being such a mysterious character stems from the fact that his bio always appears as a series of question marks in the opening theme. In addition, it seems he is prone to small fits of insanity. Towards the end of the show, it is revealed that he and Shiron are actually two halves of the same Windragon. It is also shown at the end of the series that he, like Shiron, also has a lesser, hamster-like form. He is nicknamed "Waruccho" ('わるっちょ').

== Minor/miscellaneous characters in the anime ==
Goblin

Summoned by BB to attack Shu in the first episode so he will surrender the wind talispod. While at DWC, he seems to be a file clerk.

Big Goblin

Formed by multiple goblins merging, Shiron's 1st opponent.

Storm Worm

Shiron's 2nd opponent. Does not put up much of a fight.

Giant Crab

Shiron's 3rd opponent. It only really wants to return to the sea.

Dandy the Devour Crocodile

First appears in episode 4. A water-type Legendz who is hired by DWC to negotiate with Shu for his Talispod, but is reformed and does good deeds. He calls Shiron his "aniki", which means "older brother" among yakuza. Later in the series, Dandy opens up a bar for Legendz to hang out at called "Cafe Wani no Ana", meaning "Crocodile Cave Cafe". He snaps at people when he is called a crocodile. He apparently knows Salamander, as he mentions him by name in episode 4, but exactly how they met is unknown (their friendship is unusual in that they are both opposite elements). Voice Actor: Kouji Ishii

Anna the Harpy

First appears in episode 5. A caring, free-spirited wind-type Legendz who disguises herself as a young girl to steal Shu's Talispod. However, she realizes that she cares for Shu. She manages to preserve her consciousness and does not participate in Legendz War, because Dandy protected her from the wind. Anna also convinces Shu to save his friends during Jabberwock's awakening and takes care of his mother while he saves his friends.

Fire Giant

He belongs to Ed, the self proclaimed Fire Saga. Though he knows Ed isn't very reliable, he supports him as best he can. In later episode, Fire Giant gains his consciousness back because of Ed and escapes the fate of participating in Legendz War.

Cait Sith

An intelligent cat Legendz working for DWC. However, his weakness is that he can behave very much like an ordinary cat (chasing mice, lying in sunlight, etc.) though that was due to Shu's constant attempts at proving he was literally a cat. Later episodes, he is one of the Legendz who does not participate in Legendz War (he says that this is because he is bad at fighting). He is seen helping the parents of the Sagas and the other Legendz.

Hellhounds

Five dog Legendz that combine into one. They greatly endangered Meg's life.

Rapper King the Maze Octopus

A water-type Legendz who has more of a desire to sing instead of fight. Despite his name, what he sings can't be considered rap.

Willowisp

Fire Legendz, used as a distraction to get Shiron's attention (the target at that time wasn't Shu's talispod, instead the target is Mac).

Chimera

Shape shifting Legendz, one of Shiron's first difficult opponents. This legendz can split into fiery forms of a goat, lion, eagle, and a snake.

Kraken

Water Legendz, attacks Shiron when he goes off on his own.

Zombie

Dark Legendz, able to reform no matter their damage.

Skeleton

Sent by Ranshiin to test Shiron, he summons zombies to fight him. He is actually quite irritating and more of a nuisance than anything due to his exasperating tone of voice. He escapes the fate of participating the Legendz War as he is sleeping in the sewer, avoiding the wind. He helps the parents of the Sagas and other remaining Legendz.

Golem

Earth Legendz.

Assassin Bug

Wind Legendz.

Gargoyle

A powerful dark Legendz summoned by Skeleton to deal with Shiron.

Bicorn

A dark unicorn Legendz who goes by the name "Kirubito" (Killbeat), she delights in the suffering of others. Her strongest ability is making anyone relive their worst fear, which she particularly enjoyed subjecting Greedo to.

Lesser Gargoyle

Summoned by Bicorn to cause panic amongst the people.

Yeti

Ice-Type Legendz similar to Zuou who happened to interrupt a baseball game and fights Zuou. He is difficult for a few minutes but then Zuou suddenly transforms to his second form and takes Yeti down.

Salamander

Appears in episode 20 disguised as a hotdog vendor at Coney Island. A fire-type Legendz summoned by BB to capture Shu's Talispod, but fails. A few episodes later, he reunites with Dandy and works at his bar, "Cafe Wani no Ana". Voice Actor: Eiji Takemoto

Jin

A wind-type Legendz that tries to steal Shiron's cap, summons Cloud Giant when he is outmatched.

Cloud Giant

An extremely gigantic wind-type Legendz summoned by Jin to fight Shiron after stealing Shiron's cap. He is so huge, his head literally could be in the clouds.

Dwarf

Earth Legendz.

Vampire

Dark Legendz, summoned by Halca and Ranshiin to take Shiron down, also fights and loses to Garion.

Hydra

Water Legendz, this monster appeared in the Legendz War, he has nine heads spewing bursts of acid.

Trolls

Earth Legendz.

Minotaur

Earth Legendz.

Rock Birds

Wind Legendz. One of them helps Halca to destroy Jabberwock's dark talispod after it is freed from the influence of the Jabberwock's dark crystal.

Mr. English (Eigo A-ta)

A strange carrot-nosed character who randomly appears in the show and speaks in English. Eigo assumes the role of narrator, though it is not consistent narration.

Ms. General Affairs (Soumu-san)

A polite-speaking employee of DWC who appears randomly to assist BB.

Perkins

An absentminded scientist working for DWC.

Richard/Robert/Steve

A strange little man, who is constantly changing his name and hunting profession.

Ed

The self proclaimed Fire Saga, but he is actually a timid man with few talents.

Meg's parents

Meg's mother and father, who have a small role in the anime. They are concerned for their daughter's happiness, but they know Meg makes the right choices.

Mac's parents

Mac's mother and father, who have relatively minor roles in the anime despite their concern for their son. Mac's father seems to be a pottery maker.

== Important storyline characters in the anime ==
Selba

Greedo's past Saga, who was killed by Greedo's archrival Killbeat, a bicorn.

Tornado Elemental Legion (Blue)

Fusion of Shiron, Zuou, and Garion

Volcano Elemental Legion (Red)

Fusion of Greedo, Wolfie, and Leon

Spiritual Elemental Legion (Gold)

Fusion of Shiron, Garion, and Greedo

CEO of DWC

As his name implies, he is the one who pulls all the strings at DWC (he wields more authority than Ranshiin). His entrance into the series is late, but his role is one of the most important.

Tornado King Dragon

One of the four Dragon Kings. Governs all wind-type Legendz

Storm King Dragon

One of the four Dragon Kings. Governs all water-type Legendz

Volcano King Dragon

One of the four Dragon Kings. Governs all fire-type Legendz

Earthquake King Dragon

One of the four Dragon Kings. Governs all earth-type Legendz

Jabberwock

A terrifying gigantic Legendz who is rightfully feared by those who have heard of him. He wields the power to manipulate both humans and Legendz.

The Legendz gods

Mysterious divine Legendz that appear near the end of the series, their only interest is in speaking to Shiron. The leader of these gods (a being cloaked in bright light so you can't make out his face) tends to go off subject and the others interrupt him before he goes off on a tangent, or interrupt him if he tries to explain a relevant subject that they know will likely not be understood by the one he's speaking to. An example of this is when he tried to explain the purpose of the Legendz War to Shiron, the others interrupted and explained they've tried telling that to multiple other Legendz before, but the point always flew over their heads.

Wind-Maker?/Kanerudo Windragon

An incredibly powerful Legendz of "legend" who had the power to wield all the elements. He was once the general of the army of Legendz and the heir to the throne of Tornado King Dragon. He nearly brought the world to ruin long ago and has not been heard from since, becoming no more than a legend. He is depicted in the removed and hidden final pages of the "Book of Legendz", along with many pages worth of undeciphered text. He is later revealed to be Shiron himself when he and Ranshiin combine as one.

== Characters in the manga ==
Ken Kazaki (風来ケン, Kazaki Ken)

A normally aloof kid who takes Legendz seriously. His Legendz is the Windragon Shiron (シロン). He is the Wind Saga. He's really been influenced by Eiji Yashiro, after he had been beaten twice by him and ruthlessly pressed Shiron into training. Ken has a way of forcing others to drink his green tonic (that his grandmother made) for him; once his grandmother accidentally stuffed it down Yuki's throat, and he had pushed Shiron into doing so.

Ririko Yasuhara (安原りり子, Yasuhara Ririko)

A girl talented at Legendz who has a Mermaid Tetty. She is the Saga of Water. The Water Saga's greatest gift is one of healing, which she used to the maximum when driven to do so. She likes Ken, and was shocked when learned that he was going to America.

Eiji Yashiro (八代英治, Yashiro Eiji)

The champion of the previous year's Legendz Carnival. His Legendz is a Dwarf named Kotaro. When Ken was in third grade, Eiji taught him to respect his Legendz because they are alive. He moved to America shortly after that. He liked to flick Ken's forehead and grin, "I sure like your forehead."

Hideaki Hiyama (檜山ヒデアキ, Hiyama Hideaki)

A boy who loses to Ririko every time despite all of his research on the game.

When Ririko makes it to the finals of a school Legendz tournament, he takes out a case filled with many talispods, showing that he may raise numerous Legends at one time.

Hosuke Dekai (出海砲輔, Dekai Hōsuke)

The school bully who thinks that he is the best at Legendz. Hosuke has a Troll named Banriki. He wants the Golden Soul Figure. He even tried cheating in the school Legendz tournament to acquire it. He was in the Ryudo Elementary Four, but it is unknown if he was kicked out. Ken calls him "troll."

Shunsuke Dekai (出海瞬輔, Dekai Shunsuke)

Hosuke's younger brother, who wants to win at Legendz. However, his neglection of his Werewolf Balthus prevents his victory. When Balthus is driven to attack him and Hosuke, Shunsuke refuses to attack back and instead defends himself and Hosuke, remarking that "Balthus is my best friend." Yet, later on, he loses to Tetty and Ririko.

Leo Engokuin (炎獄院レオ, Engokuin Reo)

The son of the president of DWC. He runs this year's Legendz Carnival competition. His Legendz is the Blazedragon Greedo. Leo is one of the two Fire Sagas. He had red eyes and fire came out of his hands, and had no friends as a child but his sister.

Kaoruko Goshika (御鹿カオルコ, Goshika Kaoruko)

A contestant in the Legendz Carnival. She is the daughter of a Legendz researcher looking for crystals (her character background is very similar to Haruka's in the anime). Her Legendz is Bjork the Golem. She is the Earth Saga. Ken calls her "Miss Underwear," because in the Legendz Carnival, she wore bloomers that Ken thought at first were underwear.

Namio Afuro (阿風呂ナミオ, Afuro Namio) / Namio Curly

Leo's assistant. His most prominent feature is his large Afro-style wig. He loves wigs, and tries them on when alone. He's even shown trying on a camo-styled wig. He's been with Leo a while.

Mio Engokuin (炎獄院ミオ, Engokuin Mio)

Leo's older twin sister. Mio was kidnapped by Necrom, the Dark Kingdom. Mio is the other Fire Saga. She occasionally pulls on Leo's face, and once made him promise that he would be strong.

Meiko Kajiwara (梶原 芽衣子, Kajiwara Meiko)

Meiko is a sixth grader at Kokuryu Elementary School and is Hosuke's self-proclaimed girlfriend. Meiko kidnaps Ririko to lure Ken to the school. Then she battles Ken with her Assassin Bug, Baiks (and loses, too).

Yuki Amagi (天城勇樹, Amagi Yūki)

A sixth grader at Ken's school. Yuki offers Ken his Golden Soul Figure if Ken proves himself as worthy of the soul figure. Ken's reply? He stuffed it into Yuki's mouth. He is the leader of the Ryudo Four and wields the Yeti Gosetsu.

Maki Mitsui (三井真希, Mitsui Maki)

Another sixth grader who has a Kansai dialect. She is a member of the Ryudo Four. Her Legendz is Suzu, a Catsy. Both of them love meat buns.

Vivian Kazaki (風木ビビアン, Kazaki Bibian)

Ken's rather eccentric grandmother. She makes green tonic (which Ken really hates). She also tells fortunes and somehow drove across the Pacific Ocean from Japan to America.

Jabberwock (ジャバウォック, Jabawokku)

Jabberwock is the Lord of Necrom, summoned by Skeleton Lord Lich. He was incompletely resurrected; only the power of the Water Saga and some of the Fire Saga was used in his resurrection by Lich.

Mitsuru Aoi (葵充, Aoi Mitsuru)

A soft-spoken member of the Ryudo Four. His Legendz, Sofia, is a Cloud Giant.

== Legendz types of the manga ==
- Windragon - Known owner: Ken Kazaki

A powerful wind element dragon.

- Fire Giant - Known owner: Taizo "Hentai" Henmi

A large fire element golem. It is about 12 feet (3.7 m) tall and can pull its sword out of its body.

- Troll - Known owner: Hosuke Dekai

The most powerful earth element Legendz up to date. It has amazing raw strength and lethal 1 hit kills.

- Mermaid - Known owner: Ririko Yasuhara

A water element Legendz with healing abilities and very low HP.

- Werewolf - Known owner: Shunsuke Dekai

Quick and stealthy earth element Legendz. It has a very fast long ranged attack that can be used consecutively for great damage.

- Yeti - Known owner: Yuki Amagi

Large water element Legendz that focuses on ice attacks. Proficient at counterattacks and regeneration.

- Black Hound - Known owners: Kokuryu Elementary Blackhounds (employed by Hosuke Dekai)

Fire element dog-like Legendz that usually attack in packs although alone they are very weak.

- Dwarf - Known owner: Eiji Yashiro

Small earth element Legendz with low HP and defense. About 3 feet (0.91 m) tall but with training it can become rather powerful.

- Assassin Bug - Known owner: Meiko Kajiwara

A large wind element bee Legendz. Very speedy with long range poisonous attacks.

- Catsy - Known owner: Maki Mitsui

Freakishly large earth element cat. It likes meat and doesn't like to fight.

- Giant Crab - Known owner: Kogao Kino

Strong water element crab. Large and has regeneration abilities, but incredibly slow.

- Triton - Known owner: Goh Tokudaiji

Very agile water element "lord of the water". Can manipulate water however they desire, and are very powerful around bodies of water.

== Terminology ==
Sagas

The name for the destined children who possess the power to invoke and revert their Legendz via their Soul Dolls.

Soul Doll

Pieces of crystals in which the Legendz are sealed in, and could be resurrected by using the Talispods. In the manga, it is called 'soul figures' and are pieces of data. In the anime they are all real.

Talispods

Gadgets that are used to resurrect the Legendz inside the Soul Dolls. In the manga, they are mostly toys. In the anime, except purple Talispods that are sold in the toy store, Bouchou's purple Talispod, the four Saga's and Yul Hepburn's Talispod of Darkness, are all real Talispods.

Talisdam

Made by Sasuke Matsutani and Bruno Sparks, Talisdams have three Soul Doll docking bays and are able to create the Elemental Legions (Red, Blue, Gold). The idea is first mentioned in episode 16, when Bruno decided to make his own Talispod to cheer Dino up, he thought up the idea to merge three Talispods together. The first one was made in episode 24, where Greedo, Wolfy and Leon lived in it. The first succeeded in episode 26. The second appeared in episode 31, when the Talisdam was finished and somehow flew to Shu itself. The third appeared in episode 43, and was eventually used in episode 49.
