= First Gutai Exhibition =

Japanese art exhibition

The First Gutai Art Exhibition took place at Ohara Hall in Tokyo, Japan in October 1955. It was the inaugural exhibition of the Gutai Art Association, showcasing works created by a group of young artists led by the association's founder, Jiro Yoshihara.

The Gutai group sought to experiment with unconventional formats, materials, and methods in art-making, as noted by art historian Ming Tiampo. Their projects incorporated elements of space, time, and sound, reflecting their interest in expanding artistic boundaries. According to the Gutai Art Manifesto (1956), the group emphasized the relationship between human expression and physical materials, seeking a direct connection between the artist’s intent and the medium.

== Background ==
After the Second World War, the Empire of Japan adopted a new constitution, becoming a constitutional monarchy. In the post-war period, Japanese society grappled with the challenge of reconciling modern concepts like individualism with the legacy of the militaristic empire. The artists of the Gutai group felt that traditional Japanese painting techniques were inadequate for expressing this struggle. They aimed to develop a new form of expression that would define a new era of authenticity and creative autonomy. Jiro Yoshihara, inspired by Jackson Pollock, began exploring art beyond abstract painting, delving into non-traditional processes and performance. In the exhibition invitation, he articulated the goal of the Gutai artists:

Today, the genre known as ‘pure art’ really seems to have come up against a huge wall. But with this outrageous method and sincere approach, this new group of people is attempting to break right through that wall.

Gutai artists referred to Postwar Abstraction but were wary of copying them. They incorporated everyday materials like wood, water, plastics, newspaper, sheet metal, fabrics, sand, light, and smoke. Their goal was to foster a dialogue between the materials and the artist’s spirit:

Gutai art does not distort the material. In Gutai art, the human spirit and the material reach out to each other, even though they are otherwise opposed to each other. The material is not absorbed by the spirit. The spirit does not force the material into submission.

In addition to using non-traditional materials, they experimented with performance art, installation art, sound art, and multimedia art.

== Exhibition details ==
Participating artists included:

- Akira Kanayama
- Toshiko Kinoshita
- Sadamasa Motonaga
- Saburo Murakami
- Itoko Ono
- Shozo Shimamoto
- Fujiko Shiraga
- Kazuo Shiraga
- Yasuo Sumi
- Atsuko Tanaka
- Chiyu Uemae
- Yozo Ukita
- Tsuruko Yamazaki
- Toshio Yoshida
- Jiro Yoshihara
- Michio Yoshihara

The first room of the hall’s first floor contained six works by Yasuo Sumi, eight by Toshio Yoshida, and three by Saburo Murakami, which included both frames from the performance “Making Six Holes in One Moment”. The room also featured at least one of the twenty bells from Atsuko Tanaka’s “Work (Bell)” which, when activated by a switch, rang in sequence throughout the exhibition space.

The second room featured Tsuruko Yamazaki's installation of 52 empty tin cans arranged on the floor and Akira Kanayama's balloon suspended from the ceiling. It also showcased works by Saburo Murakami, Shozo Shimamoto, and two abstract paintings by Kazuo Shiraga, created using his feet.

Fujiko Shiraga's floor path extended throughout the gallery, accompanied by a stripe work by Tsuruko Yamazaki, a small painting by Jiro Yoshihara, and Atsuko Tanaka's work, a hanging piece of pink fluorescent silk.

== Critical reception ==
The innovation of using new materials was appreciated by some critics. In recent years, critic Tominaga Sōichi and artist Dōmoto Hisao introduced the work and ideas of Art Informel, particularly through the contributions of Georges Mathieu and Michel Tapié. Although their familiarity with the movement was limited, the artists found its principles compelling and felt a strong affinity with the ideas that had been presented. They were particularly drawn to the movement’s break from conventional formalism and its emphasis on freshness and spontaneity. What surprised them most was how closely their own desire for something vital and alive resonated with the spirit of Art Informel, despite the differences in their modes of expression.

The exhibition also received criticism: "From the viewpoint of the subconscious, the work is extremely simple."; "This is a new manifestation of Dada."; and "Sensation alone is meaningless."

== See also ==
- Takesada Matsutani
- Fluxus movement
- Installation art
- Abstract expressionism
