= Yozo Ukita =

Japanese artist

Yōzō Ukita (浮田要三, Ukita Yōzō, 28 November 1924 - 21 July 2013) was a Japanese artist, educator, writer and editor. Often known as a member of the Gutai Art Association from 1955 to 1964, Ukita made a major contribution in art education for children initially through his editorship of Kirin [Giraffe], a children's magazine that experimented with merging modern art and literature intended to encourage free thinking among children in postwar Japan. His association with Gutai began when he first asked the future leader Jirō Yoshihara to contribute an artwork for the cover of the magazine. Over the years he would ask other Gutai members to also contribute in this way. He thus deepened the relationship between Gutai and children's art, a topic many members were eager to address on the pages of Kirin and elsewhere.

Ukita's own artistic practice was prompted by his affiliation with Gutai. His early geometric works were followed by gestural abstraction. He ceased art making when he left Gutai, but resumed it in 1984 by building on his experimentations with abstraction in his early Gutai days. In 1985, he established the Atelier ukita in Osaka, where he shared his serious yet playful creative spirit with adults and children alike.

== Biography ==
=== Early life and work for Kirin ===
Yōzō Ukita was born in Osaka. During the war years, he was drafted to the air force at Kakamigahara in Gifu Prefecture, where he did aircraft maintenance. After the end of his military service, he worked in Osaka for Ozaki Shobō, a publishing company. In 1948, Ukita, Yoshiro Hoshi and Adachi Ken'ichi began to work on Kirin, a new literary magazine for children founded the year before by Iku Takenaka and Yasushi Inoue. Ukita spent his days visiting elementary schools in the Kinki region, speaking with teachers and gathering children's poetry. In the evenings he assembled Kirin in a makeshift office of a small shack.

The editors of Kirin originally asked local artists to produce covers for the magazine. In 1948, Ukita first met Jirō Yoshihara, an Ashiya-based businessman, artist and future leader of Gutai, after asking him to contribute a cover to the magazine. From 1950 onward, children's art would also be used on the cover. Ukita was then tasked with choosing pieces by local children, developing all the while a deep appreciation for their fresh, unexpected and diverse artistic styles.

After Ukita joined Gutai in 1955, many Gutai artists, including Atsuko Tanaka, Shōzō Shimamoto, Kazuo Shiraga, Masatoshi Masanobu, Saburō Murakami, Sadamasa Motonaga and Tsuruko Yamazaki, had their artworks featured in Kirin. Ukita also asked his fellow artists to contribute short articles for the young readers. Gutai artists published 60 such articles. They spoke both seriously and playfully about art and creativity, and encouraged children to discover their individuality, as illustrated by Ukita's own short essay "On Being Weird," in which he called on children to embrace that which made them different:

What is weird within you is your treasure. [...] Some people are called "weirdos" in our society. They are often disliked by other people.

In my opinion, though, we need to be "weirdos" to the very core. If a person is not a weirdo, he has no value as a human being.

[...] We are all blessed, born with something weird. Please start looking immediately for whatever is weird in you.

Gutai scholars and art historians Katō Mizuho and Ming Tiampo have both posited that Kirin is an important source for understanding Gutai's creative motivations as a whole.

In December 1955, Ukita and several other Gutai artists organized a Kirin art exhibition at the Osaka City Museum of Fine Arts, with Yoshihara serving as a juror. Open to elementary and middle school children, as well as preschoolers, the exhibition called for works in non-figurative or abstract styles, with no restriction on material or size. The result was an exhibition bursting with children's artworks, with the walls covered from floor to ceiling.

Gutai members' interest in contributing art and articles to Kirin waned toward the end of the 1950s. In 1962, after several years of financial distress, Kirin changed publishers. Shortly after, Ukita ceased working for the publication.

=== Participation in Gutai ===
Despite Ukita not having any formal art training, Yoshihara invited him to join Gutai in 1955. While some members did have a formal art school education, Ukita was not the only self-taught member. Such inclusion correlated with Gutai's respect for the ingenuity of children's art and is indicative of the group's resistance to the institutional centers of the Japanese art world. As a Gutai member, Ukita's first contribution was to lend his printing press for use in the production of the first issue of the group's journal, Gutai 1. This publication constituted the group's first public collective act, even before the staging of their first exhibition. Ukita's editing experience was also an asset, since Yoshihara considered the Gutai journal to be foundational to the group and its ambitions for international recognition.

Ukita participated in more than ten Gutai exhibitions, beginning with the 1955 show Experimental Outdoor Exhibition of Modern Art to Challenge the Mid-Summer Sun, and concluding when he left Gutai in 1964.

==== Artistic style ====
At the first outdoor exhibition in 1955, Ukita presented a minimalist, geometric sculpture. He then experimented with different two-dimensional abstract styles, exhibiting a series of simple, free-hand drawings in 1957, and adopting an Informel-style impasto painting technique that exploited the materiality of oil paint around 1960.

Comments made on Ukita's work during his Gutai years evoked the ingenuity of children's art. Writing about the 1st Gutai Art Exhibition at the Ohara Kaikan in October 1955, Yoshihara described Ukita's compositions as "spontaneous" and "insolent." Fellow Gutai artist Toshio Yoshida praised Ukita's drawings, which he characterized as appearing to have been made by a child holding a pencil in his hand for the first time.

==== Essays in the Gutai journal ====
Ukita contributed several essays to the Gutai journal on different topics.

In the second issue of the Gutai journal, Gutai 2, Ukita wrote an article on the works of Michiko Inui, a sixth-grade student in Higashinari-ku, Osaka. Referring to her in the honorific (using "-san" instead of the diminutive "-chan"), Ukita demonstrated his deep respect for her artistic practice, despite her young age. Ukita described how she produced her non-figurative work in almost subconscious state of being. He hypothesized that it was through reaching such a pure state of mind that she was able to produce paintings that could "touch someone's heartstrings." Ukita also surmised that, as long as she could continue painting in such a way, she would become "a great person," rather than saying "a great painter."

Ukita's reflections upon the 1955 outdoor exhibition, which appeared in Gutai 3, point to Gutai's inventive spirit. In essence, according to him, these outdoor works were not just sculptures as such but a means of exploring new aesthetic possibilities.

His essay "The Gutai Chain," published in 1957 in Gutai 4, reflects on the importance of individuality within the artistic collective. He wrote about "a single thin, but strong unwasted backbone" that formed the bond between the members. Art historian Ming Tiampo has argued that Ukita "challenged the wartime definition of group and community," proposing a "creative ideal that valued heterogeneity and dissent as a means of strengthening both the individual and the collective".

=== Career after Gutai ===
Ukita stopped painting when he left Gutai in 1964. He returned to artmaking toward the end of the 1970s and began exhibiting his work again after 1983.

In 1985, Ukita opened the Atelier Ukita, "a painting class of contemporary art," in Osaka, making it open to the public as "a gathering place where one can see and accept oneself as well as others by making a work." In his own words, "Let us train the core of our heart by making a fun painting (work). Training the core of our heart is the most important task of us humans. So let us study the core of our heart by works we will love. Atelier Ukita is such a place."

A one-year stay in Finland from 1998 to 1999 inspired a new wave of artistic activity. In 1999, he had a solo exhibition at the Värjäämö and Louinais-Hämeen Museum in Forssa, Finland.

Ukita's later paintings attest to a playful approach to geometric abstraction. His sober and restricted compositions retain a hand-made quality informed by his irregular treatment of edges and overall forms. A posthumous publication on the work of Ukita proposed that throughout his life children's art remained "the core" of his creative work.

In 2008, he co-edited a book about Kirin with Mizuho Katō and Yūzō Kurashina, Kirin no ehon [The picture books of Kirin], reproducing many of the magazine's covers.

== Selected exhibitions and collections ==
Ukita's works have been collected by the Hyōgo Prefectural Museum of Art, the Nakanoshima Museum of Art, Osaka, and the University of Johannesburg.

=== Exhibitions as a member of Gutai ===
- July 1955: Experimental Outdoor Exhibition of Modern Art to Challenge the Midsummer Sun, Ashiya Park, Ashiya
- October 1955: First Gutai Art Exhibition, Ohara Kaikan, Tokyo
- October 1956: Small Pieces of Gutai Art Exhibition, Sanseidō Gallery, Tokyo
- April 1957: 3rd Gutai Art Exhibition, Kyoto City Museum of Art, Kyoto
- October 1957: 4th Gutai Art Exhibition, Ohara Kaikan, Tokyo
- April 1958: International Art of a New Era: Informel and Gutai, Takashimaya Department Store, Osaka
- August 1959: 8th Gutai Art Exhibition, Kyoto Municipal Museum of Art; Ohara Kaikan, Tokyo
- March 1961: Continuité et avant-garde au Japon [Continuity and Avant-Garde in Japan], International Center for Aesthetic Research, Turin
- August 1961: 10th Gutai Art Exhibition, Takashimaya Department Store, Osaka; Takishimaya Department Store, Tokyo
- April 1962: 11th Gutai Art Exhibition, Takashimaya Department Store, Osaka
- January 1963: 12th Gutai Art Exhibition, Takashimaya Department Store, Tokyo
- April 1963: 13th Gutai Art Exhibition, Takashimaya Department Store, Osaka
- March 1964: 14th Gutai Art Exhibition, Takashimaya Department Store, Osaka

=== Retrospective Gutai exhibitions ===
- 1976: Gutai bijutsu no jūhachinen [Eighteen Years of Gutai Art], Osaka Civic Gallery, Osaka
- 1979: Yoshihara Jirō to Gutai no sono go [Yoshihara Jirō and today's aspects of Gutai], Hyogo Prefectural Museum of Modern Art, Kobe
- 1983: Sechs Japanische Künstler der Gutai-Gruppe [Six Japanese artists of the Gutai Group], Atelierhaus Hildebrandstrasse, Düsseldorf
- 1990: Gutai: Mikan no zen'ei shūdan [Gutai: Unfinished Avant-Garde group], Shōtō Museum of Art, Tokyo
- 1990: Giappone Allávanguardea il Gruppo Gutai negle anni Cinquanta [Gutai, 1950s Japanese Avant-garde], Galleria Nazionale d'Arte Moderna, Rome
- 1991: Gutai Japanische Avantgarde / Japanese Avant-garde 1954-1965, Matildenhöhe, Darmstadt
- 1992-1993: Gutai ten I: 1954-1958 [Gutai exhibition I: 1954-1958]; Gutai ten II: 1959-1965 [Gutai exhibition II: 1959-1965]; Gutai ten III 1966-1972 [Gutai exhibition III: 1966-1972], Ashiya City Museum of Art & History, Ashiya
- 1999: Gutai, Galerie Nationale du Jeu de Paume, Paris
- 2004: The 50th Anniversary of Gutai Retrospective Exhibition, Hyogo Prefectural museum of Art, Kobe
- 2012: GUTAI: The Spirit of an Era, The National Art Center, Tokyo
- 2012: A Visual Essay on Gutai at 32 East 69th Street, Hauser & Wirth, New York
- 2013: Gutai: Splendid Playground, The Solomon R. Guggenheim Museum, New York
