= Gendai Bijutsu Kondankai =

Japanese study and discussion group

Gendai Bijutsu Kondankai (現代美術懇談会, Contemporary Art Discussion Group, short: ゲンビ Genbi) was a study and discussion group founded in 1952 to facilitate interdisciplinary and cross-genre exchanges among Japanese artists based in the Kansai region. Among the participants were key figures of Japanese avant-garde art after World War II, such as calligraphers Shiryū Morita, Yuichi Inoue and Sōgen Eguchi, potter Yasuo Hayashi, and painters Waichi Tsutaka, Kokuta Suda, Jirō Yoshihara and future members of the Gutai Art Association. Genbi's activities, which included monthly meetings and group exhibitions, ceased in 1957.

== History ==
The Genbi group was founded in November 1952 by the painters Jirō Yoshihara, Kokuta Suda, Takao Yamazaki, Makoto Nakamura, and Kenzō Tanaka, and the sculptor Shigeru Ueki, with the support of the journalist Hiroshi Muramatsu, an arts and culture editor at the Osaka head office of Asahi Shimbun. The group was created as a platform for free cross-genre exchange between established and emerging artists from the Kansai region and sought to transcend the artists’ affiliations to established dantai art associations. Genbi grew out of existing artist circles for cross-genre discussion beyond dantai structures; yet, it was distinct in its members’ commitment to modern, non-figurative, abstract art.

Genbi participants came from various artistic backgrounds. Many were painters and sculptors from established art associations such as Nika-kai ("Second Section Society," commonly known as Nika), Modan Āto Kyōkai ("Modern Art Association"), Kōdō Bijutsu Kyōkai ("Action Art Association," commonly known as Kōdō) and Kokugakai ("National Painting Society," commonly known as Kokuga). They were working within a broad range of abstraction, from geometric to organic to gestural abstraction. They were joined by avant-garde artists of traditional Japanese arts such as calligraphy, ceramics, and ikebana; for example they included members of the Kyoto-based cermicist groups Shikōkai ("Four Plowmen Group") and Sōdeisha ("Running Mud Association"), and the calligraphy group Bokujinkai ("Ink People Society," commonly known as Bokujin), as well as by fashion, commercial, and industrial designers, photographers, art historians, collectors, critics, journalists, and gallery owners. Some of the younger participants, such as Michio Yoshihara, Shōzō Shimamoto, Tsuruko Yamazaki, Toshio Yoshida, and Chiyū Uemae, under the guidance of Jirō Yoshihara, went on to found the Gutai Art Association in 1954, and were later joined by fellow Genbi members Akira Kanayama, Kazuo Shiraga, and Atsuko Tanaka. It is estimated that Genbi had about 100 registered members of which around 30 to 40 were regularly active. Genbi's activities ceased in 1957.

=== Artistic interests ===
Genbi members explored abstract art and pushed the boundaries of their genres, rejecting long-held conventions while introducing unconventional materials and production methods. They also shared a heightened awareness of the latest developments in the arts worldwide and a strong ambition in the pursuit of global recognition, on par with artists in Western Europe and the US.

Painters, such as Kokuta Suda, Kenzō Tanaka, Jirō Yoshihara, Kazuo Shiraga, Chiyū Uemae, and Toshio Yoshida experimented with unusual methods of applying paint onto painting surfaces, such as rubbing, smearing or dripping. Others like Mitsuyoshi Kageyama or Atsuko Tanaka included aluminum, strings or textiles, or, as in Tanaka's case, eventually even exhibited unpainted textiles hanging from the wall. In an effort to modernize calligraphy, Shiryū Morita, Yuichi Inoue, and Sōgen Eguchi, positioned themselves parallel to European and US-American gestural abstract oil painting and introduced new materials such as enamel and oil paint. They proposed new interpretations of the relationship between characters and blank space in calligraphy, and challenged the principle of legibility. Avant-garde potters and ceramicists such as Yasuo Hayashi, Sango Uno, Yasuyuki Suzuki and Shogo Miura rejected the classic concept of utility in pottery, i.e. as container, in order to create ceramic works that were deliberately nonutilitarian. Ikebana artists such as Toyotake and Fumiko Abe explored ikebana's affinities with sculpture and created works without any plants but made instead with board and nails.

== Monthly meetings ==
The original aim of the Genbi group was to organize monthly meetings at which a variety of topics related to modern art were studied and discussed. Topics included recent international developments in art, children's art, art education, architecture, commercial and industrial design, the use of materials such as plastic, exhibitions, films, music, psychology, philosophy, literature, music, Zen, and color science. Artists as well as scholars and experts were invited to these sessions as speakers or discussants, including art historians Shizuichi Shimomise, Yasuo Kamon and Itsuji Yoshikawa, philosopher and Buddhism scholar Shin’ichi Hisamatsu, French literature scholar Masakiyo Miyamoto, music critic Mitsuhiko Fujita and poet Tōsaburō Ono. From 1952 to 1957, 43 meetings took place, most of them at the building of the Asahi Shimbun head office in Osaka.

== Exhibitions ==
Although it was not part of its original program, between 1953 and 1957, Genbi also organized five annual group exhibitions called Genbi-ten (Genbi Exhibition) in several Japanese cities. The range of mediums presented at these exhibitions went beyond painting, sculpture and calligraphy to include textile dye art, ikebana, pottery, photography, fashion, and commercial and industrial design and crafts. Most of the works were "non-figurative" and "abstract", as announced explicitly on the poster for the 2nd Genbi Exhibition in 1954. For the first four Genbi Exhibitions, the works displayed were selected by a jury committee; however, this changed for the 5th Genbi Exhibition in 1957, which was instead an open exhibition.

At the 3rd Genbi Exhibition in 1955, Atsuko Tanaka presented her interactive work Bell, which had been first exhibited at the First Gutai Art Exhibition a month earlier. Consisting of 20 electric bells that visitors could make ring noisily by pushing a button, it created a kind of spatial painting, causing quite a stir among the jurors as it was questioned the definition of painting. In the same spirit, Tanaka also showed another Work made of three unpainted cotton cloths hanging on the wall in the same exhibition.

In 1954 and 1955, Genbi also organized two Modern Art Fairs (Modan āto feā) at the Daimaru Department Store in Osaka, where works of the similarly wide range of mediums were presented together with contributions by architects and everyday objects of "good design" by leading brands.

The Genbi Exhibitions and Modern Art Fairs included works by artists other than the regularly active Genbi members. For example, they included painters Tarō Okamoto, Masanari Murai, and Takeo Yamaguchi, ikebana artists Bunpo Nakayama, Hōun Ohara, and Sōfū Teshigahara, ceramists Yoshimichi Fujimoto, Junkichi Kumakura, and Kazuo Yagi, and fashion designer Chiyo Tanaka. Genbi exhibition salso included Katsuhiro Yamaguchi and Shōzō Kitadai, two members of the Tokyo-based intermedia group Jikken Kōbō (Experimental Workshop).

- 1st Genbi Exhibition, July 19–24, 1953, Asahi Hall, Kobe
- Modern Art Fair, May 4–9, 1954, Daimaru Department Store, Osaka
- 2nd Genbi Exhibition, November 13–18, 1954, Matsuzakaya Department Store, Osaka; November 22–26, 1954, Kyoto Municipal Art Museum; December 10–16, 1954, Asahi Hall, Kobe
- 2nd Modern Art Fair, June 7–12, 1955, Daimaru Department Store, Osaka
- 3rd Genbi Exhibition, November 24–28, 1955, Kyoto Municipal Art Museum; December 1–5, 1955, Asahi Hall, Kobe; December 13–19, 1955, Osaka Municipal Art Museum
- 4th Genbi Exhibition, October 22–30, 1956, Kyoto Municipal Art Museum; November 1–6, 1956, Hanshin Department Store, Osaka
- 5th Genbi Exhibition, November 22–28, 1957, Kyoto Municipal Art Museum; December 23–28, 1957, Osaka Municipal Art Museum

== Impact ==
Genbi provided a well-organized inclusive forum for cross-genre, interdisciplinary exchange between artists, regardless of their affiliations, genres, generations, and social standings. It facilitated joint study and discussion of topics in relation to modern art and was unique in its members' commitment to non-figurative, abstract art as well as their avant-gardism that radically challenged the conventions of traditional Japanese arts such as pottery, ikebana and calligraphy. The display of various art genres together created a multi-sensorial experience for viewers, allowing them to draw new connections between the works, irrespective of the art categories they belonged to. The exhibitions imparted the artists' shared interest in challenging the conventions and limits of their respective genres. Furthermore, by including works from the applied arts, the Genbi Exhibitions highlighted the Genbi artists’ interest in making art more accessible and in adapting to the changing material conditions of modern everyday life. By integrating applied and commercial arts and opening up the discussions to an extended range of topics, Genbi challenged the conventional definitions of art. It placed artistic production in new contexts and raised questions about the arts' role within modern everyday life. As a community that also shared insights on developments in the international art world, Genbi was crucial in "consolidating Kansai’s art identity, offering several ways of combining local artistic efforts with global thinking."

Genbi laid the groundwork for the foundation of the Gutai Art Association, which introduced performative and relational elements to painting through its radically experimental projects. Not only was Gutai founded in 1954 by Jirō Yoshihara with 16 younger Genbi members, but also it benefited from Genbi's interdisciplinary and global scopes. However, with Gutai's rise, their radical questioning of the very definitions of art genres, and their growing global ambitions, the Gutai members eventually withdrew from Genbi.
