= Fujiko Shiraga =

Japanese sculptor and painter (1928–2015)

Fujiko Shiraga (白髪富士子 Shiraga Fujiko, born Uemura Fujiko, 1928–2015) was a Japanese avant-garde artist and one of the earliest female members of the Gutai Art Association. Active as an artist between the early 1950s and 1961, Shiraga was known for creating highly tactile artworks by pasting and creasing sheets of torn Japanese paper. Since last decade, Shiraga's works have received growing art-historical attention. Her paper works, paintings, and installations were featured in major Western exhibitions on Gutai art and two posthumous retrospectives.

== Biography ==
Born in 1928, Shiraga was the second daughter of a family that ran a watch store in Osaka, Japan. She studied tsuzumi (Japanese hand drum) under the influence of her mother's interest in Noh music.

Although she received little formal fine arts training, Shiraga began making art after marrying Kazuo Shiraga in 1948 at the age of 20. In 1952, She joined Zero Society (Zero-kai), an art collective founded by Kazuo and other artists including Murakami Saburō, Atsuko Tanaka, and Akira Kanayama.

Around June 1955, together with other members of Zero Society, Shiraga joined Gutai Art Association. In July 1955, Shiraga created installation White Plank for the "Experimental Outdoor Exhibition of Modern Art to Challenge the Midsummer Sun" mounted by Gutai and Ashiya City Artists Association (Ashiya-shi Bijutsu Kyōkai) at a park on the bank of Ashiya River, Hyogo, Japan

From 1955 to 1960, Shiraga actively contributed her works to Gutai's exhibitions and events. She created unique hanging scrolls and paper canvases using torn Japanese washi paper. She wrinkled, tore, and glued the paper with rice paste to create texturized surfaces. By creasing, layering, and occasionally piercing the paper sheets, Shiraga emphasized the objecthood and three-dimensionality of the thin paper, which had conventionally been seen as flat carriers of texts or images.

In the late 1950s, Shiraga pushed her experiments with paper further. She sculpted sheets of paper to make large panels of abstract high reliefs that protruded from walls. Shiraga also started to incorporate wax, glass, and fire to further diversify the surface texture of her works. Echoing Gutai leader Yoshihara Jirō's call for Gutai art to "reveal the scream of matter itself", Shiraga highlighted the tactility and materiality of her artworks.

Simultaneous to her artistic experiments, Shiraga published writings on her colleagues' and her own work in Gutai's journal, Gutai. In a 1955 article 'About Myself Before and After the Outdoor Exhibition, she reflected on her first-time experience of creating artworks in the outdoor space of a public park. Another article by Shiraga, published in 1956, described her encounter with Bell (1956), an interactive acoustic installation by her Gutai colleague Atsuko Tanaka. Shiraga provided a detailed account of how Bell was experienced by its immediate audience and explicated her interpretation of the new relationship between art and viewers envisaged by the work.

In 1961, Shiraga decided to quit artmaking to assist her husband Kazuo's artistic career. She explained in a later interview that her intention was to help her husband to "pursue the road of painting with no distraction". Albeit no longer making art by herself, Shiraga remained close to the Gutai community and continued to support Kazuo by preparing paints for his signature foot paintings and advising him on colors and when to stop. Recent scholarship has suggested that Shiraga's contribution to Kazuo's artistic career was more like a form of artistic collaboration and creative partnership rather than mere housekeeping assistance.

== Work ==
=== White Plank (1955) ===
In July 1955, Gutai held the "Experimental Outdoor Exhibition of Modern Art to Challenge the Midsummer Sun" in July 1955 at a public park on the bank of Ashiya River, Hyogo, Japan, in conjunction with Ashiya City Artists Association. For this exhibition, Shiraga made White Plank by painting an eight-meter-long plank white and sawing it apart. The serpentine split in the middle of the plank resembled a long brushstroke. Shiraga stated that she intended to create "an enormous crack in the empty sky" to "express that vast power which lies beyond human comprehension". The motif of cracks and splits occurred repeatedly in her later paintings and washi paper works.

In an article published in the Gutai journal, she described her feelings when she first took White Plank to the site of the exhibition: "I was shocked and dumbfounded, feeling as if I had been hit on the head so hard that I almost fainted. How insignificant my work appeared. How obviously intentional it appeared to be. It radiated power that was neither limitless nor massive."

=== Washi paper works ===
Between 1955 and 1958, Shiraga used torn washi paper to created hanging scrolls and paper canvases. Devoid of visual imagery, the monochromatic works emphasized the texture and materiality of paper. In an interview, Shiraga commented on the unique texture of washi paper: "To begin with, I loved washi, that materiality, that texture. It's white, but not pure white. With a shade of beige, it's never pure white. This appealed to me. Its texture differs from crisp Western paper, too. Washi is soft. If you want, you can easily tear it." Shiraga's paper works highlighted the physical interaction between her body and washi paper.

In the early 1960s, Shiraga started to incorporate oil paints, glass shards, and pieces of wood in her washi paper works. She also occasionally used fire to burn parts of the canvases. Shiraga confessed that she loved using "dangerous" materials like broken glass and fire. The contrast between the soft, wrinkled paper and other hard materials highlighted the tactility of the canvases and created visual rhythm.

=== Paintings and sculptures ===
Several of Shiraga's paintings from the late 1950s consisted of vertical lines, which she created by letting paint to drip or flow down the canvases. The blank canvases were split into parts by the lines, just like the wood plank of White Plank was sawn apart. Shiraga also made sculptures with cement blocks into which she dug vertical trenches and filled them with green paints.

== Selected exhibitions ==
Work by Fujiko Shiraga has featured in:

- 1955 Experimental Outdoor Exhibition of Modern Art to Challenge the Midsummer Sun, Ashiya Park, Hyogo
- 1955 1st Gutai Art Exhibition, Ohara Hall, Tokyo
- 1956 Outdoor Gutai Art Exhibition, Ashiya Park, Hyogo
- 1956 2nd Gutai Art Exhibition, Ohara Hall, Tokyo
- 1957 3rd Gutai Art Exhibition, Kyoto Municipal Museum
- 1957 4th Gutai Art Exhibition, Ohara Hall, Tokyo
- 1958 5th Gutai Art Exhibition, Ohara Hall, Tokyo
- 1958 2nd Gutai Art on the Stage, Sankei Hall, Osaka
- 1958 6th Gutai Art Exhibition (Gutai New York Exhibition), Martha Jackson Gallery, New York and toured New England, Minneapolis, Oakland, and Huston
- 1959 8th Gutai Art Exhibition, Kyoto Municipal Museum; Ohara Hall, Tokyo
- 1960 9th Gutai Art Exhibition and International Sky Festival, Takashimaya Department Store, Osaka
- 1961 10th Gutai Art Exhibition, Takashimaya Department Store, Osaka; Takashimaya Department Store, Tokyo
- 1961 Continuité et avant-garde au Japan, International Center of Aesthetic Research, Turin
- 1985 Yoshihara and Gutai, 1954–1972, Ashiya Civic Centre
- 1985 Reconstructions: Avant-garde Art in Japan 1945–1965, Museum of Modern Art Oxford; toured to Fruitmarket Gallery, Edinburgh
- 1986 Japon des avant gardes, 1910–1970, Musée National d’Art Moderne, Centre Georges Pompidou, Paris
- 1992 Gutai I: 1954–1958, Ashiya City Museum of Art and History
- 1993 Gutai II: 1959–1965, Ashiya City Museum of Art and History
- 1994 Japanese Art After 1945: Scream Against the Sky, Yokohama Museum of Art, toured to Guggenheim Museum SoHo, New York
- 2010 Gutai : dipingere con il tempo e lo spazio, Museo Cantonale d’Arte, Lugano; Parco di Villa Ciani, Lugano, Switzerland
- 2013 Gutai: Splendid Playground, Guggenheim Museum, New York
- 2015 Kazuo Shiraga Memorial Room 6th Exhibition: Memorising Fujiko Shiraga, Amagasaki City Cultural Center, Amagasaki
- 2015 Kazuo and Fujiko Shiraga, Fergus McCaffrey Gallery, New York

== Collections ==
- Fergus McCaffrey Gallery, New York
- The Art Institute of Chicago
- The Kazuo Shiraga Memorial Room, Amagasaki City Cultural Center, Amagasaki, Japan
- Nakanoshima Museum of Art, Osaka, Japan
