= Shozo Shimamoto =

Japanese artist (1928–2013)

Shōzō Shimamoto (嶋本 昭三, Shimamoto Shōzō; January 22, 1928 – January 25, 2013) was a Japanese artist. Having studied with Jirō Yoshihara, the future Gutai leader, from 1947, Shimamoto was a key founding member of Gutai along with Yoshihara and fifteen others in August, 1954. He was close to the leader Yoshihara and actively engaged in the early activities and group administrations. He worked with a wide variety of techniques, such as poking holes in layered newspaper, throwing bottles of paint at canvases, experimenting with film and stage performances, and composing sound art. He was particularly noted for his innovative performance art. Indeed, when Yoshihara turned to focus more on painting, upon his meeting with the French art critic Michel Tapié, Shimamoto continued to urge the leader to pursue this direction, wanting to work with Allan Kaprow, for example.

After Gutai, he became known for his mail art activities with the group AU and the continuation of his painting performances which he staged around the world. He died of acute heart failure in Nishinomiya City, Hyōgo prefecture.

== Early years ==
Shimamoto was a student of Yoshihara's beginning when he was nineteen, in 1947.

In 1950, he graduated from the School of Humanities, Kwansei Gakuin University in 1950.

== Hole Series and early work ==
Shimamoto has cited the calligraphy work of Nantembō as an early influence, noting that “The thing that surprised me most when I went to see this master was that he used a very large paintbrush and with this he created much larger works than he contemporaries.” Of his early works from 1950 he has described “a single arrow sign on a piece of paper, a picture of only one circle drawn on the canvas, and a hole made on the center of the canvas, etc.” The latter of these refers to his “Hole” series, in which he perforated the picture plane of the painting. These works were developed out of the economic conditions following the Second World War and his inability to afford canvas. By glueing together layers of newspaper, he created a new kind of support which he called “paper-vas.” The paper-vas was adhered with a glue made from flour and water, onto which a final layer of brown cartridge paper was glued and then painted white. He found that when painting the support would tear where the glue had not dried completely. The tearing of the support inspired him to make a series of works with perforated paper-vas, resulting in artworks like his 1950 Work (Holes). In this work, the white, monochromatic surface appears on the verge of crumbling from a series of aggressive pencil gestures. A similar work, Holes (1954), is in the collection of the Tate Modern.

Prior to these works, Yoshihara had been little impressed by Shimamoto's efforts, discouraging him from pursuing painting as a career after some time. Motivated by the challenge, Shimamoto promised him a painting that hadn't been painted before. This caused Shimamoto to create the first paper-vas work, for which Yoshihara enthusiastically praised him. Shimamoto recounted that when he had shown his first Hole work to Yoshihara, they “both felt that something great had been accomplished.” He then locked himself in his room and produced more using the same method to which Yoshihara, according to Shimamoto, “gave them a glance and just told me that he had seen this stuff before.” Yoshihara discouraged him from continuing the series when they first encountered the “buchi” works of Lucio Fontana which also pierce the surface of the painting. Although the works were made contemporaneously and without knowledge of one another (according to Shimamoto), Yoshihara felt that Shimamoto's works would inevitably be regarded as derivative due to biases of the art world at the time. As Alexandra Munroe suggests, these works “defiantly opposed established notions of permanence in abstract modernist painting and introduced hin (poverty)—the appreciation of minimal and naturally weathered objects as cultivated in the arts of tea— into the context of contemporary Japanese art.” As such, the Hole series “represents the beginning of a Gutai Style” for Munroe.

== Activities with Gutai Art Association ==
In 1954, Shimamoto participated in the “Second Genbi Exhibition,” showcasing the artist of the Gendai Bijutsu Kondankai (Contemporary Art Discussion Group) started by Hiroshi Muramatsu and strongly influenced by Yoshihara. The group sought to rethink hierarchy on every level of the art world. The exhibition, held at the Asahi Biru Gallery in Kobe, brought together many young Kansai-based artists who would soon establish Gutai with Yoshihara. Shimamoto was responsible for proposing the name Gutai, translated from Japanese as “concrete” or “embodied.” Of this name he has explained, “We did not want to show our feeling indirectly or abstractly.” Shimamoto is also responsible for approaching members of the Zero-kai group, Kazuo Shiraga, Saburo Murakami, Atsuko Tanaka, and Akira Kanayama, to join Gutai after some of the initial members left. Shimamoto's house became the first headquarters for the group, and is where the first Gutai journal was published.

Shimamoto also contributed to Gutai through his writing, published in the Gutai journal. This attitude toward painting is also shown in his 1957 text “The Idea of Executing the Paintbrush,” in which he writes, “I believe that the first thing we should do is to set paint free from the paintbrush.” He furthermore advocates the recognition that “a color without matiére cannot exist” and that therefore the artist should paint in a manner that “takes advantage of the texture of the paint and gives it a lively feeling.” In one article, “Mambo and Painting,” Shimamoto argued for the destruction of “the values established by the art elite” through the creative incorporation of audience participation. In opposition to the art “elite,” Shimamoto wrote, “it would never due for those elitist to consider a masterpiece a painting made by dancing the mambo on a canvas.”

In July 1955 Shimamoto created his work Please Walk on Here as a part of the “Experimental Outdoor Exhibition of Modern Art to Challenge the Midsummer Sun” in Ashiya City. The work consisted of two narrow sets of wooden boards arranged in a straight path. One set was stable to walk on while the other was unstable, akin to a broken rope bridge. At this exhibition Shimamoto also showed a metal giant plate perforated with small holes, a development on his former Hole series though this time as a means to intervene in the viewer's engagement with space. The plate was painted white on one side and blue on the other and was illuminated from behinds with a lamp in the evenings. Please Walk on Here was reproduced and exhibited on the occasion of the 1993 Venice Biennale.

One aspect of the elitist attitude toward art to which Shimamoto set himself in opposition seems to be the myth of artistic genius and intentionality against which he utilized accidental and incidental forms of mark-making. “I think that superior paintings can be made by paint spilt over after accidentally dropping a ball from the second floor and knocking over a can of paint… in that act there is no superfluous action or ambition.” This rejection of the conventional valorization of the artist or the artwork can also be read when he writes that, “When one’s irrepressible excitement is expressed, and it is linked to the past through direct expression, the value of the art lies not in the artist nor in the work. It lies in the will to create.” As art historian Joan Kee notes, Shimamoto's activities in the early years of Gutai are indicative of the group's “a singular kind of expression” that is neither easily categorizable as Action Painting nor ‘Happening.’

This experimentation with unconventional materials and methods as a means to painterly originality continued in Shimamoto's early Gutai work. In the Gutai Open Air Exhibition of July 1956, Shimamoto built a cannon using acetylene combustion out of which he shot paint on a sheet of red vinyl to produce Cannon Work. The performance was accompanied with background music. In October of that same year, he produced Breaking Open the Object in which he filled glass bottles with paint and shattered them on an unstretched canvas beneath him. This “Bottle Crash” method of painting, as he called it, would become a signature method of performing his painting. In an interview with Lorenzo Mango, Shimamoto describes one impetus for his initial experiments that led to the use of cannons and the “Bottle Crash” method. As opposed to the athleticism required or Kazuo Shiraga and Saburo Murakami’s activities, Shimamoto says, “I, being physically weaker than them, thought of throwing bottles filled with color paint or making it explode with a cannon.” While he initially was frustrated that media outlets would cover his unconventional process but take less interest in the final painting that resulted, he “started to think differently, both by proposing ideas to change the setting, and by taking on a certain behavior for those occasions.” Following this he notes, “So I can say that the relation between my work and my events have been taught to me by journalists.”

This thinking around an active relation to painting was brought to the stage for Gutai’s May 1957 exhibition Gutai Art on Stage at Sankei Hall in Osaka. Beginning from a completely dark stage, glass bulbs illuminated with light were lowered from the ceiling. Shimamoto then shattered the globes, extinguishing them by smashing them with a stick. After this, two large, white glass tubes were lowered and as he smashed them they released four thousand ping pong balls. In these works, Shimamoto was concerned with the act of art-making by using processes of destruction. Shimamoto also experimented with film and electronic music at this event. The music was made to accompany his The Film that Doesn’t Exist Anywhere in the World (1957), which was an overlapping, double projection of hand-painted animation on film on a single screen. Due to a lack of funds, Shimamoto had one of his junior high school students from his teaching job take discarded film from his work in a movie theater. He then washed the film with vinegar and proceeded to draw a simple animation on the frames. To create the accompanying music, Shimamoto decided to use a tape recorder, which had recently been introduced to the market. The result was similar to musique concréte, a translation of “gutai music.” However, Shimamoto disliked the structure of musique concréte, and therefore tried to make unstructured music using everyday sounds. These included the sounds of water flowing from a tap, a chair being pulled out, and a little being hit. Discouraged by a lack of attention and the daunting comparison with the privileged precedent of John Cage, discouraged Shimamoto and the film and audio sat in a storehouse undisturbed for over forty years. They have since been divided and housed in the collections of the Pompidou in Paris and the Ashiya City Museum of Art and History.

Shimamoto was also the first artist to have a solo exhibition at the Gutai Pincotheca, the Gutai gallery and center in Osaka. The exhibition ran from October 1 to 10, 1962. In the text for the exhibition written by Yoshihara he describes Shimamoto's innovative contributions to art, including “a huge work, which I still consider a masterpiece, made by simply using a broom to spread yellow paint across the surface of a large white canvas.” He also remarks on “a sculpture made up almost exclusively of razor blades” made when Shimamoto was a student, a “kaleidoscope projection,” and “a work rolled up like a tunnel and therefore only visible from the inside” which was exhibited at the Second Gutai Exhibition in Tokyo.

Michel Tapié, in his 1957 text “A Mental Reckoning of my First Trip to Japan” originally published in Bijutsu Techo, singled out Shimamoto from the Gutai group along with Yoshihara, Kazuo Shiraga and Atusko Tanaka as “four artists who should appear alongside the most established international figures.” Shimamoto expressed his belief that Gutai would have been more original and experimental had Taipé not influenced the group's direction so heavily. He remained a member of Gutai until 1971, a year before the group officially disbanded with the death of Yoshihara. Shimamoto's departure stemmed from disagreements over finances within the group over Gutai’s participation in Expo ‘70, the first World’s Fair in Asia and a landmark event for Japanese contemporary art.

== After Gutai ==
Shimamoto became the director of the AU (Artist Union and, later, Art Unidentified) in 1967. As he notes, “artists who had studied in prestigious universities and had learned the fundamental techniques, tended to stray away from the group, while other less educated artists and those with physical or mental handicaps became members.” He cites their unconventional perspectives as responsible for art “evolving past the most common artistic sense” in a way that “generates new vigor.” Although Shimamoto had already known about mail art through Gutai’s correspondence with Ray Johnson, it was during his involvement with AU that Shimamoto grew his interest in mail art. This has been attributed to meeting Byron Black in Japan, a Texas video artist who had been involved with the alternative space Western Front where much mail art was produced. Shimamoto’s mail art activities included many irregular shaped cards that he would mail to both artists and regular people, such as cardboard cut in the shape of a hiragana “A” character. This was published on the cover of a magazine that featured some of Shimamoto's writing.

In response to his experimentation with the Japanese postal system, people began to send him bizarre items by sticking stamps on them and sending them through the mail. These included a dried squid, a grain of rice affixed with a postal tag for objects smaller than a postcard, and a wooden cabinet for sandals sent in its constituent parts (including the sandals) which had to be subsequently reassembled.

In 1976 Shimamoto made a road of 10,000 newspapers on the back of the Murogawa river. Similarly, he exhibited 10,000 newspapers as a part of the “World Symposium Invitation Show” in Alberta, Canada.

In 1986, on the occasion of Italian mail artist Guglielmo Achille Carvellini’s visit to Japan, Shimamoto shaved his head. From this point he would ask the artists he visited to treat his bald head as a picture plane. Subsequently, his head was used to carry messages and pictures as well as a surface to project slides and films onto.

Throughout his career, Shimamoto was also engaged in the art of children. Of the annual children’s painting exhibition in Ashiya (founded 1949) Shimamoto writes, “Immediately after the war, we members of Gutai created several works using new methods. It is no exaggeration to say that we owe all this to the children and this exhibition.” We may see the influence of children's creativity on his own practice in what he sees as an absence of intervening thought. Describing a video of Picasso artistically arranging terracotta pipes found lying in the street, he notes how “he enjoyed himself with the naturalness of a child, without hesitation.” This he links to the importance of useless things in a society mediated by overly rational and teleological conventions of thought, or, as Romano Gasparotti has phrased it, “a) a form of expression not yet conditioned by cultural patterns and preestablished forms, b) holistic attention to the world understood as an undivided whole and which was therefore in contrast with the hyper-analytical attitude typical of the technical-scientific mentality capable only of separating, dividing, and dissecting.” The importance of this direct engagement with material in art can be applied to the kinds of methods that Shimamoto sought in his practice.

Shimamoto's post-Gutai career was also marked by his passion for world peace activism, inspired in part by a visit in 1986 from Bern Porter. Porter, a nuclear physicist ho worked on the Manhattan Project and took up a life of austerity and expiation after the nuclear bombing of Japan, would subsequently nominate Shimamoto for a Nobel Peace Prize. In a work produced in 1999, Heiwa no Akashi (A Proof of Peace), he dropped glass bottles of paint on a concrete slab while lifted in midair at Shin Nishinomiya Yacht Harbor. The work is supposed to be continued every year for 100 years on the condition that peace remains in Japan, with new artists and members of the public contributing to the painting using Shimamoto's glass bottle technique. Similarly, in 2006 he performed A Weapon for Peace at the Piazza Dante in Naples. For this performance, the square was set with an enormous canvas with a grand piano in the center. Shimamoto then entered the area through a tube of white canvas, suggesting a kind of birth. Shimamoto, suspended by a crane from a harness, dropped “strange spheres made up of numerous plastic cups full of coloured paint” onto the canvas and piano below. Throughout the performance, Charlemagne Palestine played a different piano, set to the side of the painting area. Shimamoto has called peace the “theme” of his life.

Shimamoto's painting performances would continue in varying forms throughout his later work, including a 2008 performances at the Ducal Palace in Genoa, Certosa do Capri and Punta Campanella. His works are in museum collections such as those of the Tate Gallery and the Tate Modern (in both London and Liverpool) and the Hyōgo Prefectural Museum of Art in Kobe, Japan. New York Times art critic Roberta Smith has noted him as one of the most daring and independent experimentalists of the postwar international art scene in the 1950s. In 1997 his mail art works were shown in the solo exhibition "Shozo Shimamoto's Gutai & A.U." in the 'E-mail Art Archives' of Guy Bleus, Center for Visual Arts, Hasselt, Belgium. In 1954 he won the Association Award at the Modern Art Association in Japan, an association he would join as a member in 1957. He received the competition prize at the 9th Contemporary Art Exhibition of Japan in 1969, a Dark Blue Ribbon Medal in 1999, and the Hyōgo Prefectural Cultural Award in 2000.

== Bibliography ==
- Jirō Yoshihara; Shōzō Shimamoto; Michel Tapié; Gutai Bijutsu Kyōkai. Gutai [= 具体] (具体美術協会, Nishinomiya-shi : Gutai Bijutsu Kyōkai, 1955–1965) [Japanese: Serial Publication: Periodical] OCLC 53194339 [Worldcat "Other titles" information: Gutai art exhibition, Aventure informelle, International art of a new era, U.S.A., Japan, Europe, International Sky Festival, Osaka, 1960]
