= Suda Kokuta =

Japanese artist (1906–1990)

Suda Kokuta 須田 剋太
- Born: Suda Katsusaburo; 1 May 1906; Fukiage, Saitama, Japan
- Died: 23 July 1990 (aged 84); Kobe, Hyogo, Japan
- Known for: Painting, drawing, calligraphy, ceramics

Suda Kokuta (Japanese: 須田 剋太; 1 May 1906 – 14 July 1990) was a Japanese artist of the 20th century. He is known for his paintings and calligraphy.

== Career ==
Initially, in the 1930s, Suda painted in a figurative style (Yoga) before moving on to become an important abstract painter of the Japanese Avant-garde art scene throughout the 1950s, 60s and 70s.

In his later life, he focused on Zen calligraphy. He was an active member of numerous discussion groups regarding art and calligraphy and in 1955 he co-founded the Modern Art Club of the Kansai region along with Yoshihara Jiro (1905–1972), Yagi Kazuo (1918–1979) and Tsutaka Waichi (1911–1995). In 1967, he became a teacher at Nishinomiya School.

In the 1970s, he illustrated many travel essays and in 1985, wrote a book entitled Watakushi no zokei: Gendai Bijutsu (My Formulation: Contemporary Art), a philosophical volume concerning his thoughts and influences.

== Collections ==
Works by the artist can be found in the collections of:

- The Museum of Modern Art, Saitama
- Iida City Museum of Art, Nagano
- Osaka Prefecture (Osaka Prefectural 20th Century Art Collection)
- Konosu City, Saitama
- Miho Museum, Shiga
- Otani Memorial Art Museum, Hyogo
- Shinseikan – Kokuta Suda, Tatsuzo Shimaoka Museum, Hokkaido
- Gangōji Temple, Nara
- Jakushū Itteki Library, Fukui
- Kahitsukan Kyoto Museum of Contemporary Art, Kyoto
- Shizuoka Prefectural Museum of Art
- L.A. County Museum of Art
