= Nakahara Nantenbō =

Japanese Zen Master and artist

- 中原 南天棒
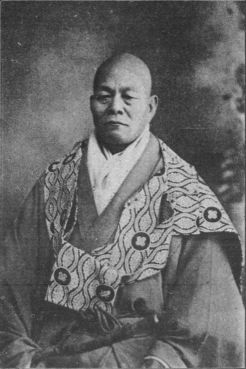
- Born: April 3, 1839
- Died: February 12, 1925 (aged 85)

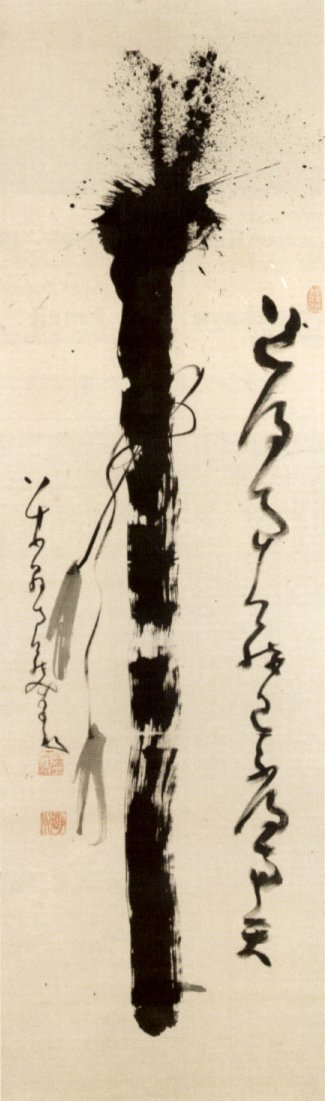
Painting and calligraphy on silk signed “Hachijūgo (85-year-old) Nantembō Tōjū”, 1923

Nakahara Nantenbō (中原 南天棒; April 3, 1839 – February 12, 1925), also known as Tōjū Zenchū, Tōshū Zenchū 鄧州全忠, and as Nantenbō Tōjū, was a Japanese Zen Master. In his time known as a fiery reformer, he was also a prolific and accomplished artist. He produced many fine examples of Zen Art and helped bridge the gap between older forms of Zen Buddhist art and its continuation in the 20th century.

== See also ==
- Buddhist art in Japan
- Bokuseki
