= Kazuo Shiraga =

Japanese abstract painter

- 白髪 一雄
- Born: August 12, 1924; Amagasaki, Japan
- Died: April 8, 2008 (aged 83); Amagasaki, Japan
- Occupation: Painter

Kazuo Shiraga (白髪 一雄, Shiraga Kazuo; August 12, 1924 – April 8, 2008) was a Japanese abstract painter and the first-generation member of the postwar artists collective Gutai Art Association (Gutai). As a Gutai member, he was a prolific, inventive, and pioneering experimentalist who tackled a range of media: in addition to painting, he worked in performance art, three-dimensional object making, conceptual art, and installations, many of which are preserved only in documentary photos and films.

Shiraga is best known for his abstract paintings, or the so-called “foot painting”, which he created by spreading oil paint initially on paper and later on canvas with his feet. Through this original method he had invented in 1954, he made a critical engagement with the tradition of painting, the result of which resonated with European and American gestural abstraction of the 1950s, such as Informel and Abstract Expressionism. In the 1960s and 1970s, he reintroduced tools such as boards and spatulas for spreading the paint.

His experiments outside painting, such as Challenging Mud and Ultramodern Sanbasō, were closely associated with the notion of “picturing,” derived from e (絵), or “picture” in Japanese, that Gutai members shared in exploring new ways of painting. At the same time, his innovations were at times associated with his embrace of violence and the grotesque, which Shiraga had been fascinated with since his childhood.

Among the Gutai members who were promoted by the French art critic Michel Tapié in Europe and the US, Shiraga was most recognized after the leader Jirō Yoshihara and most commercially successful as a solo artist as early as the late 1950s; and his success continues to date with in the international auctions.

== Biography ==
=== Early life ===
Born in 1924 as the first son of a family of kimono fabric merchants in Amagasaki, Shiraga grew up in a refined environment, in which arts like oil painting as well as traditional Japanese performing arts and Chinese classic literature were cultivated. Although he was interested in oil painting, Shiraga began studying Nihonga (traditional Japanese painting) in 1942 at the Kyoto City Special School of Painting (now Kyoto City University of Arts), which at that time only offered studies in Nihonga or design. Shiraga’s studies were interrupted when he was drafted by the Japanese army in 1944. He resumed his studies in 1945 after the end of World War II.

=== Early postwar years, 1946–1955 ===
In 1946 Shiraga remained bedridden for several months after contracting pneumonia associated with rheumatic fever. During this time, he engaged with writings by the art critic Usaburō Toyama. In 1948, Shiraga married Fujiko Uemura, who eventually became an artist of her own, but who also committed herself to assisting her husband’s artistic production. In the same year, Shiraga graduated from the Kyoto Municipal School of Painting and finally began studying oil painting at the Art School of the Osaka Municipal Museum of Art as well as with the painter Tsugurō Itō. At Itō’s recommendation, Shiraga joined the Shinseisaku Kyōkai (New Production Association) and showed his works in the association’s exhibitions in Tokyo and in the Kansai region until 1952. Shiraga also attended the meetings of the Gendai Bijutsu Kondankai (Contemporary Art Discussion Group), founded in 1952 by artists such as Jirō Yoshihara and Kokuta Suda to provide an open forum for cross-genre exchange for artists from the Kansai region. In 1952, Shiraga co-founded Zero-kai (Zero Society) with Akira Kanayama and Saburo Murakami, all members of the Shinseisaku Kyōkai, who were later joined by Atsuko Tanaka. He held a two-person show with Murakami in 1954. It was at this time that Shiraga created his first “foot paintings”, for which the artist used his feet to spread oil paint on canvasses placed horizontally on the floor.

=== Gutai Art Association and solo career, 1955–1972 ===
In April 1955, Shiraga, Murakami, Kanayama and Tanaka quit Zero-kai and joined the Gutai Art Association, founded a few months earlier under the leadership of Jirō Yoshihara. Shiraga continued to participate in most of Gutai’s projects and exhibitions until the group’s dissolution following Yoshihara’s death in 1972. Besides a great number of foot paintings, Shiraga created objects, performances, and installation artworks, particularly in the context of Gutai events, such as Red Logs (commonly also known as Please Come In) at the Experimental Outdoor Exhibition of Modern Art to Challenge the Midsummer Sun, Challenging Mud at the First Gutai Art Exhibition in 1955, and the Ultramodern Sanbaso performance at the Gutai Art on the Stage event in 1957.

When Gutai began collaborating with the influential French art critic Michel Tapié, a promoter of European Informel art, in 1957, Shiraga, along with Yoshihara, Tanaka, and Sadamasa Motonaga, became one of the Gutai artists whom Tapié promoted and made contracts with.

Fueled by Tapié’s engagement, Shiraga’s works were increasingly included in group exhibitions beyond the Gutai context, both in Europe and in Japan. In 1959, Shiraga’s works were shown in the exhibition Fifteen Japanese Contemporary Artists Recommended by Tapié at Gendai Gallery in Tokyo, at the XI Premio Lissone internationale per la pittura in Italy, and at the Métamorphismes at Galerie Stadler in Paris. In 1960, Shiraga was selected to contribute to the 4th Contemporary Art Exhibition of Japan, a major biennial exhibition. In 1962, Shiraga held his first solo exhibition at Galerie Stadler, Paris, followed by another at the Gutai Pinacotheca in Osaka.

In the mid-1960s, Shiraga began to explore new colors and methods for his paintings, shifting from foot-painting to the use of tools such as wooden ski-like boards to spread the paint. Although his national and international recognition as a solo artist grew, Shiraga continued to contribute to Gutai’s projects such as International Sky Festival in 1960, the group’s participation in exhibitions by the German and Dutch artist groups Zero and NUL, such as NUL 1965, and the Expo ‘70 in Osaka, until the dissolution of Gutai in 1972.

=== Becoming a monk, 1971–1974 ===
In 1971 Shiraga entered the Tendai sect’s priesthood at the Enryaku-ji temple on Mount Hiei and committed himself to Buddhist training in Mikkyō (Esoteric Buddhism). Shiraga ceased to paint while training and resumed regular painting activities after his ordination in 1974. Shiraga meditated before painting and prayed/invoked to Fūdo Myōo.

=== Later life ===
In the years following his ordination and Gutai’s dissolution, Shiraga’s works continued to be included in group exhibitions in museums and galleries in Japan, as well as in solo exhibitions in galleries in the Kansai region. As one of the seminal members of Gutai, his works were presented from the 1980s onwards in an increasing number of major survey exhibitions of postwar Japanese art and Gutai retrospectives, including Japon des avant-gardes 1910–70 at the Centre Georges Pompidou, Paris, in 1986, at the occasion of which Shiraga travelled to Europe for the first time.

Shiraga’s first solo exhibition at a major museum took place in 1985 at the Hyogo Prefectural Museum of Modern Art. Retrospective exhibitions of his work were held at the Amagasaki Cultural Center in 1989 and at the Hyogo Prefectural Museum of Modern Art in 2001. He was awarded the Hyogo Prefectural Cultural Prize in 1987, the Distinguished Service Medal for Culture in 2001, and the Osaka Art Prize in 2002.

Shiraga died at his home in Amagasaki on April 8, 2008, of sepsis.

== Work ==
=== Early works ===
Shiraga, who was painting and drawing landscapes and urban cityscapes in his 20s, picked up Post-Impressionist and Surrealist disfiguration in the late 1940s, inspired by European Romanticist literature and Japanese folk tales. In 1952 he further shifted to abstraction by meticulously scraping layers of paint over the whole on the canvas with palette knives and spatulas. The neatly aligned segments of blurred and blended paint produced the effect of shimmering reflections on deformed mirrors and attested to Shiraga’s interest in making visible the process of painting. Around 1954, Shiraga gave up using tools and used his hands, fingers, and fingernails to smear the oil paint (predominantly monotone crimson lake red) in linear movements all over the canvasses.

=== Foot paintings ===
Untitled (1958), an example of Shiraga's foot paintings, at Glenstone in 2023

Shiraga created his first foot paintings in 1954. His method involved stepping into the picture to smear the oil paint on a large painting support spread horizontally on the floor, with the intent of avoiding compositional control, structure, and color. He soon hung a rope from the ceiling of his studio, which he could hold on to, so that he could glide over the painting surface without falling. In the beginning, Shiraga used torinoko paper as support for his foot paintings, but at the request of Tapié, who took into consideration marketing strategies, conservation, and transportation of the works, Shiraga introduced canvas, produced works in larger scale, and began to sign his works in Kanji (Chinese characters) instead of in Roman letters.

In the mid-1960s, Shiraga began to explore skis and wooden spatulas, later supplemented by paper rolls and squeegees, as tools for applying oil paint, in addition to the layers of paint he spread with his feet. These tools allowed Shiraga to produce broader stripes, fan-shaped semicircle forms and, after his ordination as Tendai priest in the 1970s, circles of smeared paint, creating a tension between clearly formed shapes and uncontrolled splashes and trails of paint. In the 1970s, Shiraga introduced new shining and vibrant colors of alkyd paint. Around 1980, Shiraga returned to foot painting, in which black and white were the dominant colors, until his death in 2008.

The foot paintings became Shiraga’s trademark work, which fit well into Tapié’s strategies in promoting gestural abstract painting in Japan and in the US in the 1950s, owing to Shiraga’s fierce production process and dynamic visual language, which evoked elements of traditional Japanese arts and cultural practices such as ink wash painting, calligraphy, Zen practices, and martial arts.

Shiraga’s making of his foot paintings, which the artist occasionally presented publicly, has been well documented by photographs and films, which shaped the increasing recognition of his painting method as work of performance since the early 1960s, for instance, by Pierre Restany.

==== Suikoden (Water Margin) series ====
Around 1958 Shiraga, considering the difficulties to identify his works when sent to Europe, began to entitle his foot paintings with the names of figures from Suikoden (Water Margin), a 14th-century Chinese novel about 108 warrior heroes and their violent fights for justice. Fascinated with the stories and the vitality of these heroes since his childhood, he repeatedly drew parallels to being an artist, also within a collective structure. Some of Shiraga’s untitled paintings that were created earlier were given titles retrospectively. Shiraga used the names of 106 heroes as titles for his paintings between 1959 and 1965 and reluctantly applied the names of two remaining figures for paintings he created in 2001. As he later said: “The heroes in Water Margin each have their own unique personalities, and to me each one seems quite extreme. […] And that led me to the sense that my painting should be about personality, about pushing my own personality to the limit. I moved gradually in that direction. In Water Margin, you see people being heroic and also horrific.” Shiraga, however, did not use these Suikoden-inspired titles in the exhibitions; instead, the works on display were labeled as Sakuhin (Work). After his ordination to the Tendai sect in 1974, Shiraga chose Buddhism-related titles instead, such as the names of deities or concepts.

=== Objects, installation works, and performances ===
In addition to his foot paintings, Shiraga also created conceptual objects, three-dimensional installation artworks, and performances, most of which were produced in the context of Gutai events and exhibitions, reaching from the Experimental Outdoor Exhibition of Modern Art to Challenge the Midsummer Sun in 1955 to Gutai’s projects for the Expo ’70 in Osaka.

For the Experimental Outdoor Exhibition of Modern Art to Challenge the Midsummer Sun in 1955, Shiraga created Red Logs (commonly also known as Please Come In) (1955), a cone-shaped construction made of painted wooden logs, into which he cut notches with an axe. The act of production on site was documented through striking photographs, on the basis of which this work has often been considered as public performance; however, Shiraga did not think of this work as either sculpture or performance, but as an extension of his painting practice and as “openings to a picture that could be looked at endlessly”. Shiraga picked the same material of roughly cut (and red painted) wood for several three-dimensional pieces constructed between 1956 and 1957, which, too, made used holes and openings in wooden structures as apparatus to look through, e.g., Lense (1956), two Objects Challenging Red Lumber (1956), Red Lumber (1956), and Work (Red Lumber) (1957).

In the mid-1960s, Shiraga picked up the shape of semicircles he used in his paintings and created huge objects that formally referred to Japanese sensu and ougi hand fans made of paper. At times, Shiraga combined these objects with oil paintings, such as White Work and Object, White Fan (1966).

==== Challenging Mud, 1955 ====
At the First Gutai Art Exhibition at Ohara Hall in Tokyo in October 1955, Shiraga exhibited two large-scale foot paintings, and, in the yard outside, Red Logs (Please Come In). In the same yard, Shiraga, in the presence of press and photographers, at three occasions during the exhibition, stripped down to his underwear and wrestled in a heap of wall plaster and concrete. This mud, which bore the traces of Shiraga’s crawling and punching, was left on display during the exhibition and discarded afterwards. Documented by striking photographs and film, Challenging Mud has been considered performance and action art, though Shiraga conceived it as an extension of his foot painting.

For the 2nd Outdoor Gutai Art Exhibition in summer 1956, Shiraga created two works which formally and materially responded to Challenging Mud: Oval, an oval shaped heap of mud completely covered in vinyl sheet, whose organic shape and soft slick texture and hairy applications made it look like a gigantic invertebrate; and Circle, another heap of earth covered by a plastic sheet. Shiraga’s 16 Individuals, presented at the 9th Ashiya City Art Exhibition in 1956, consisted of sixteen small disk-shaped heaps of cement, all painted in different color combinations and arranged horizontally on a canvas on the floor.

==== Ultramodern Sanbasō, 1957 ====
Shiraga opened the Gutai Art on the Stage show at the Sankei Halls in Osaka and Tokyo in 1957. At the beginning of his act, the stage was empty besides painted wooden poles placed against the backdrop. After the poles fell one by one, Shiraga in a red costume and a large mask with formally exaggerated features appeared on the stage and performed his own version of sanbasō, a traditional celebratory dance of Noh and Kyōgen theater. Then, Shiraga, joined by other Gutai members on the stage, shot arrows against another screen in the background.

=== Concept of shishitsu ===
Among the Gutai members, Shiraga was an important theorist who articulated ideas vital to understanding the group's goal. A key term in Shiraga’s theoretical reflections writings was shishitsu, meaning temperament and innate disposition in Japanese. In his essays for the Gutai journal, Shiraga repeatedly described the importance of grasping one’s own innate sensibility, which was to be supplemented by dispositions acquired through individual experiences. This individual sensibility should be physically expressed through the artist’s body and by fitting material. Shiraga adopted Toyama’s categorization of 20th-century painting as either intellectual or emotional, as well as the art critic’s claim that “pure painting” should be an expression of the artist’s sensibility. As he later recalled, “Reading these passages, I wondered which of the two tendencies I belonged to. Based on the works I was creating, I thought I was heading in the emotional direction. I thus concluded that my mission from now on was to reach the farthest end of this emotional direction.” He thus explained his passion for impulsive bodily exertion and for the heavy, thick material of oil paint.

=== Aspect of violence ===
The recurrent reference of Shiraga’s oeuvre to fleshy, violent acts in the production of his works, to the martial struggle between material and human body (of the artist), and to his fascination with bloody and gruesome material and contents has been widely discussed by scholars. His fascination culminated in works such as his paintings Inoshishigari (Wild Boar Hunting) I and II (1963), for which the artist mounted a boar’s hide on a canvas, which he covered with splashes of blood-like red and brown viscous oil paint. As the artist himself articulated: “My art needs not just beauty, but something horrible.” Shiraga’s fascination with violent bodily acts, sanguinity and martiality has been understood as political engagement with the wartime past of Japan, as “coded narrative about the violence of war and the pervasiveness of violence in everyday life” or, in parallel to the Japanese postwar authors of nikutai bungaku (carnal literature), as liberating “embodiment of individual freedom and subjectivity” in opposition to the totalitarian militarist Japanese regime. Shiraga has never been deployed to the front as a soldier, but he later indicated that his impressions of the devastations by World War II, which he had experienced after his return to Amagasaki, were materialized in his works. According to the artists’ own words, it was also fueled by his childhood experience of seeing injured and dead participants of danjiri cart-pulling rituals at Shinto festivities in Amagasaki and the region. Shiraga’s fascination with the closeness of bloody violence and beauty has been described as a hedonistically masochistic and “sadistic vein” in his work, but also considered as fed by an understanding of martiality and the grotesque as a part of masculinity, as, for instance, represented in classic Chinese and Japanese literature and painting.

== Auctions and notable sales ==
In December 2014 Shiraga's Chijikusei Gotenrai (1961) was sold for 3.25 million euros. Those prices would later be topped in 2018, when another foot painting sold for over 8.7 million euros.

== Retrospective exhibitions ==
- 1989: Encounters Between Body and the Material: Shiraga Kazuo, Amagasaki Cultural Center, Amagasaki
- 2001: 白髪一雄展: アクションぺインター / Kazuo Shiraga (Kazuo Shiraga exhibition: Action painter), Hyogo Prefectural Museum of Modern Art, Kobe
- 2009: 白髪一雄展: 格闘から生まれた絵画 / Kazuo Shiraga: Painting Born Out of Fighting, Azumino Municipal Museum of Modern Art, Toyoshina, and other venues
- 2015: Between Action and the Unknown: The Art of Kazuo Shiraga and Sadamasa Motonaga, Dallas Museum of Art, Dallas
- 2020: 白髪一雄 / Kazuo Shiraga: A Retrospective, Tokyo Opera City Art Gallery, Tokyo

== Sources ==
=== Catalogues ===
- 白髪一雄展: 格闘から生まれた絵画 / Kazuo Shiraga: Painting Born Out of Fighting, exh. cat., Azumino Municipal Museum of Modern Art, Toyoshina, Amagasaki Cultural Center, Yokosuka Museum of art, Hekinan City Tatsukichi Fujii Museum of Contemporary Art, Amagasaki: Executive Committee for the exhibition “Kazuo Shiraga”, 2009.
- Kazuo Shiraga: Six Decades, eds. Reiko Tomii, Fergus McCaffrey, exh. cat., McCaffrey Fine Art, New York, New York: McCaffrey Fine Art, 2009.
- Kazuo Shiraga, eds. Dominique Lévy Gallery, Axel Vervoordt Gallery, New York: Dominique Lévy Gallery, Axel Vervoordt Gallery, 2015.
- Between Action and the Unknown: The Art of Kazuo Shiraga and Sadamasa Motonaga, exh. cat., Dallas Museum of Art, 2015.
- 没後10年 白髪一雄「水滸伝豪傑シリーズ」アクション・ペインティングによる豪放の世界 / Shiraga Kazuo: The Water Margin Hero Series: A Heroic World of Action Painting (Commemorative Exhibition Marking the 10th Anniversary of the Artist’s Death), exh. cat., Amagasaki Cultural Center, Amagasaki: Amagasaki Cultural Center, 2018.

=== Articles ===
- “Kazuo Shiraga: A Selected Chronology”, Kazuo Shiraga, eds. Dominique Lévy Gallery, Axel Vervoordt Gallery, New York: Dominique Lévy Gallery, Axel Vervoordt Gallery, 2015, 283–293.
- Hirai, Shoichi, “The Action Painting of Kazuo Shiraga”, Kazuo Shiraga, eds. Dominique Lévy Gallery, Axel Vervoordt Gallery, New York: Dominique Lévy Gallery, Axel Vervoordt Gallery, 2015, 26–31.
- Hirai, Shoichi, “On Shiraga Kazuo’s Water Margin Hero series”, 没後10年 白髪一雄「水滸伝豪傑シリーズ」アクション・ペインティングによる豪放の世界 / Shiraga Kazuo: The Water Margin Hero Series: A Heroic World of Action Painting (Commemorative Exhibition Marking the 10th Anniversary of the Artist’s Death), exh. cat., Amagasaki Cultural Center, Amagasaki: Amagasaki Cultural Center, 2018, 30–38.
- Kawasaki, Koichi, “Out of Gutai: Shiraga Kazuo and Motonaga Sadamasa”, Between Action and the Unknown: The Art of Kazuo Shiraga and Sadamasa Motonaga, exh. cat., Dallas Museum of Art, 2015, 10–21.
- McCaffrey, Fergus, “Beyond Transmission Failures: Shiraga in a New Context”, Kazuo Shiraga: Six Decades, exh. cat., McCaffrey Fine Art, New York, New York: McCaffrey Fine Art, 2009, 74–85.
- Misawa, Shinya, “The Water Margin and Kazuo Shiraga”, 白髪一雄展: 格闘から生まれた絵画 / Kazuo Shiraga: Painting Born Out of Fighting, exh. cat., Azumino Municipal Museum of Modern Art, Toyoshina, Amagasaki Cultural Center, Yokosuka Museum of art, Hekinan City Tatsukichi Fujii Museum of Contemporary Art, Amagasaki: Executive Committee for the exhibition “Kazuo Shiraga”, 2009, 230–233.
- Nakajima, Izumi, “A Shiraga Kazuo Chronology”, Between Action and the Unknown: The Art of Kazuo Shiraga and Sadamasa Motonaga, exh. cat., Dallas Museum of Art, 2015, 134–141.
- Pacquement, Alfred, “Kazuo Shiraga: Painting as Ritual”, Kazuo Shiraga, eds. Dominique Lévy Gallery, Axel Vervoordt Gallery, New York: Dominique Lévy Gallery, Axel Vervoordt Gallery, 2015, 11–13.
- Ritter, Gabriel, “Between Action and the Unknown”, Between Action and the Unknown: The Art of Kazuo Shiraga and Sadamasa Motonaga, exh. cat., Dallas Museum of Art, 2015, 22–39.
- Senoo, Aya, “An Artist’s Creative Vitality, Inspired by Water Margin”, 没後10年 白髪一雄「水滸伝豪傑シリーズ」アクション・ペインティングによる豪放の世界 / Shiraga Kazuo: The Water Margin Hero Series: A Heroic World of Action Painting (Commemorative Exhibition Marking the 10th Anniversary of the Artist’s Death), exh. cat., Amagasaki Cultural Center, Amagasaki: Amagasaki Cultural Center, 2018, 108–113.
- Shiraga, Kazuo, “Interview with Shiraga Kazuo, with Osaki Shin’ichiro and Yamamura Tokutarō”, July 10, 1985, Between Action and the Unknown: The Art of Kazuo Shiraga and Sadamasa Motonaga, exh. cat., Dallas Museum of Art, 2015, 125–133.
- Tiampo, Ming, “’Not just beauty, but something horrible’: Kazuo Shiraga and Matsuri Festivals”, Kazuo Shiraga, eds. Dominique Lévy Gallery, Axel Vervoordt Gallery, New York: Dominique Lévy Gallery, Axel Vervoordt Gallery, 2015, 14–25.
- Tomii, Reiko, “Shiraga Paints: Toward a ‘Concrete’ Discussion”, Kazuo Shiraga: Six Decades, exh. cat., McCaffrey Fine Art, New York, New York: McCaffrey Fine Art, 2009, 9–30.
- Uematsu, Atsushi, “Kazuo Shiraga’s Concept of ‘Shishitsu’ and His Series”, 白髪一雄展: 格闘から生まれた絵画 / Kazuo Shiraga: Painting Born Out of Fighting, exh. cat., Azumino Municipal Museum of Modern Art, Toyoshina, Amagasaki Cultural Center, Yokosuka Museum of art, Hekinan City Tatsukichi Fujii Museum of Contemporary Art, Amagasaki: Executive Committee for the exhibition “Kazuo Shiraga”, 2009, 234–237.
