= Saburo Murakami =

Japanese artist (1925–1996)

- Born: June 27, 1925; Kobe, Japan
- Died: January 11, 1996 (aged 70); Nishinomiya, Japan
- Movement: Gutai group
- Spouse: Makiko Yamaguchi (m. 1950)
- Children: 1

Saburo Murakami (Japanese: 村上 三郎, Hepburn: Murakami Saburō; June 27, 1925 – January 11, 1996) was a Japanese visual and performance artist. He was a member of the Gutai Art Association and is best known for his paper-breaking performances (kami-yaburi) in which he burst through kraft paper stretched on large wooden frames. Paper-breaking is a canonical work in the history of Japanese post-war art and for the history of performance art. Murakami's work includes paintings, three-dimensional objects and installation as well as performance, and is characterized by a highly conceptual approach that transcends dualistic thinking and materializes in playful interactive forms and often thematizes time, chance and intuition.

== Biography ==
Saburo Murakami was born in Kobe, Japan, in 1925, as the third son of an English teacher at Kwansei Gakuin Junior High School. He entered Kwansei Gakuin University in 1943, joined the university's painting club Gengetsu-kai and began studying oil painting under Hiroshi Kanbara. After World War II, he resumed his studies, graduating from Kwansei Gakuin in 1948. In 1949, Murakami participated in the exhibitions of the art association Shinseisakuha kyōkai and began to study under painter Tsugurō Itō. In 1950, Murakami began working as an art teacher at an elementary school. He continued to teach art in elementary, middle and high schools, universities and kindergartens throughout his life. In 1951 he enrolled in aesthetics at Kwansei Gakuin's graduate school. In the early 1950s, he participated in several group exhibitions, such as the exhibitions of the Shinseisaku Kyōkai (between 1949 and 1954) and the Ashiya City Exhibitions (from 1952 until his death). In 1952 Murakami formed the Zero-kai (Zero Group) with Kazuo Shiraga, Atsuko Tanaka, and Akira Kanayama, all fellows from the Shinseisaku Kyōkai. In 1953, he held his first two-person exhibitions with Yasuo Nakagawa and Kazuo Shiraga. In spring 1955, the Zero-kai members joined the Gutai Art Association, led by Jiro Yoshihara.

During his membership in Gutai from 1955 until 1972, Murakami presented his works mainly within Gutai projects, including the Outdoor Art Exhibitions at Ashiya Park in 1955 and 1956, the Gutai Art Exhibitions, the Gutai Art on the Stage shows in 1957 and 1958, the International Sky Festival in 1960, and Gutai's participation in Expo '70. Murakami's first solo exhibition took place at the Gutai Pinacotheca in 1963. Murakami was also a fixture in the group's international collaborations with French art critic Michel Tapié, art dealers Rodolphe Stadler in Paris and Martha Jackson in New York, and with the artist groups ZERO and Nul in Germany and the Netherlands. In 1960, Murakami was appointed the Japanese representative at the International Centre of Aesthetic Research Committee in Turin. In 1966, on behalf of Gutai, Murakami travelled to the Netherlands to facilitate the group's participation in exhibitions with the Dutch and German artists groups Nul and ZERO. Murakami remained a Gutai member until 1972. Erudite in literature, aesthetics and philosophy, he was considered the "philosopher" among the Gutai members.^{[6]}

Beginning in 1972, Murakami's work increasingly included performance and interaction with the visitors of his exhibitions in galleries in Osaka and Kobe. Around 1975, Murakami became involved in the artist collaborative Artist Union (AU) formed by fellow Gutai artist Shōzō Shimamoto and organized exhibitions, symposiums and mail art projects. He continued to exhibit new works in group exhibitions such as the Ashiya City Exhibitions, but he also participated in an increasing number of exhibitions worldwide featuring Gutai.

In 1990 he became a full professor of Kobe Shoin Women's Junior College, where he had taught art since 1950. Murakami died in 1996 of a cerebral contusion. At that time, he was preparing his first retrospective at the Ashiya City Museum of Art & History.

== Personal life ==
In 1950, he married Makiko Yamaguchi. Their son Tomohiko Murakami, born in 1951, is a critic and researcher of manga and pop culture and has been a professor at Kobe Shoin Women's University. Murakami recounted that his paper-breaking was inspired by his toddler son, who in a tantrum burst through the fusuma paper space divider at their home.

== Artwork ==
Around 1953, Murakami gave up figurative painting and began making abstract paintings with surfaces that were structured in impastoed segments of oil paint. In the mid-1950s, he began to experiment with methods of applying paint, such as throwing a ball, which he had dipped into color, onto sheets of paper. Murakami's discovery of tearing paper and other surfaces as a method of artistic production marked a turning point in his approach to painting and provided the basis for his later performance works.

For the First Gutai Art Exhibition at Ohara Hall in Tokyo in 1955, Murakami stretched paper onto wooden frames, burst through the paper, and put the remaining ripped paper on display. The first version Muttsu no ana (6 Holes) from 1955 posed the question of what constitutes the actual artwork – the object, the performance or the photography. Murakami continued to perform the act of paper-breaking (kami-yaburi) throughout his entire life, varying in the number and quality of paper screens as well as in the structure.

For the Gutai group's experimental projects like the Outdoor Art Exhibitions of 1955 and 1956, the Gutai Art Exhibitions between 1955 and 1971, and the Gutai Art on the Stage shows of 1957 and 1958, Murakami contributed interactive three-dimensional conceptual objects and performances of tearing paper. Examples include Hako (Box) (1956), a wooden box with a ticking and ringing clock inside, Kūki (Air) (1956), a box made of plexiglass that contained nothing but air, and Arayuru fūkei (All Landscapes) (1957), a simple wooden frame hanging from the branches of a tree. In 1957, Murakami created a number of paintings applying nikawa, an animal glue used in Nihonga painting, to the canvas, with the effect that the surface gradually peels off with time.

Between 1958 and 1963, when Gutai was working with the French art critic and advocate of Informel, Michel Tapié, Murakami created gestural abstract paintings with multiple layers of synthetic resin paint applied in dynamic rough movements and streaming down the surface. He experimented with varying the structures of surfaces by attaching wooden frames or molded plaster. From 1963 onward, Murakami adopted a new style in his paintings by reducing the number of colors of paint and simplifying the pictorial formal elements, by which he thematized the boundaries of painting.

As a further questioning of painting, in 1970, he stuck together the front sides of two canvasses so that only the backsides of the frames were visible and covered the structure with paint. In 1971, Murakami held a solo exhibition, during which wooden boxes were placed throughout the city of Osaka and then collected and dismantled in the gallery Mori's Form. After this exhibition, Murakami submitted his resignation from Gutai, which was rejected by Yoshihara. After Gutai dissolved following Yoshihara's death in 1972, Murakami's exhibitions, which he held in galleries in Osaka and Kobe, increasingly centered around events of performance and interaction with the visitors. Painting and drawing often were part of these events, such as in the case of Suji (Lines) at Shinanobashi Gallery Apron in Osaka in 1974, during which Murakami's work consisted in the act of drawing a line on sheets of paper with the arrival of each visitor. He also continued to create conceptual objects and installation artworks, which were shown in group exhibitions, e.g. the Ashiya City Exhibitions and projects by the Artists Union. From the 1980s onward Murakami recreated some of his works from the early Gutai years and performed paper-breaking for the increasing number of exhibitions worldwide that featured Gutai from a historical perspective.

Murakami was also a renowned painter, whose highly conceptual methods and presentation led to experimentation with a variety of painting gestures inspired by children. A central premise of his work was the playfulness of the creative act of painting.

Murakami's art is characterized by a highly conceptual, relational and at the same time strongly intuitive approach that often materialized in seemingly simple works that bring into focus the effects and the experience of space and time, chance and intuition. Murakami's paintings, three-dimensional objects and performances challenged preconceptions on painting, art and perception of the world at large, and are considered as important examples of performance and conceptual art in Japan.

Murakami's works are held in public and private collections all over the world, e.g. Ashiya City Museum of Art & History, Osaka City Museum of Modern Art, The National Museum of Modern Art, Kyoto, The National Museum of Art, Osaka, Chiba City Museum of Art, Museum of Contemporary Art, Tokyo, Hyōgo Prefectural Museum of Art, The Miyagi Museum of Art, Axel and May Vervoordt Foundation, Guggenheim Abu Dhabi, The Art Institute of Chicago, The George Economou Collection, the Museum of Modern Art, New York, Centre Georges Pompidou, Paris, M+, Hong Kong, Rachofsky Collection, Dallas.

== Reception ==
Reports on Gutai exhibitions in the Japanese press in the mid-1950s depicted Murakami's performance of paper-breaking as an attention-seeking whimsical stunt by a proponent of a group of provocative young artists, rather than considering its deeper art-theoretical implications. Hako (Box) from 1956 was also described as provocative gag in the press.

With the international expansion of Gutai's network in the late 1950s and early 1960s, paper-breaking, along other Gutai artists' works, became part of the growing international discourse on action and performance art. Murakami's three-dimensional objects and installation artworks were revalued in the context of the emergence of art movements in Europe and the US that experimented with approaches of installation, environment and conceptual art at the same time. In particular, through the striking photographs of 6 Holes (1955) and Passage (1956), the latter also documented by photographer Kiyoji Otsuji, paper-breaking became iconic for Gutai, post-war Japanese art and performance art.

A work painted by throwing a ball from 1954 has been acquired by the Museum of Modern Art, New York.

Until the 1990s, Murakami's works were predominantly dealt with in the context of the art historical assessment of the Gutai group at large. His abstract paintings from about 1957 until the 1960s were thus considered as works from Gutai's phase of regression from experimental interactive three-dimensional objects and performances towards conventional gestural abstract painting caused by the influence of Tapié. Since the 1990s, Murakami's works, including his paintings from the 1960s and his performative exhibitions from the 1970s, have been increasingly reconsidered art historically and acknowledged.

== Exhibitions (selection) ==
- 1952 5th Ashiya City Exhibition, Buddhist Hall, Ashiya
- 1953 Two-person exhibition with Yasuo Nakagawa, Gallery Umeda, Osaka
- 1953 Two-person exhibition with Shiraga Kazuo, Hankyū Department Store, Osaka
- 1955 Experimental Outdoor Exhibition of Modern Art to Challenge the Midsummer Sun, Ashiya Park, Ashiya
- 1955 First Gutai Art Exhibition, Ohara Hall, Tokyo
- 1956 6th Kansai Art Exhibition, Osaka City Museum of Fine Arts
- 1956 Shinkō Independent Exhibition, Shinkō shinbun newspaper, Kobe
- 1956 9th Ashiya City Exhibition, Seidō Elementary School, Ashiya
- 1956 Outdoor Gutai Art Exhibition, Ashiya Park, Ashiya
- 1956 2nd Gutai Art Exhibition, Ohara Hall, Tokyo
- 1957 3rd Gutai Art Exhibition, Kyoto Municipal Museum of Art
- 1957 Gutai Art on the Stage, Sankei Hall, Osaka/ Sankei Hall, Tokyo
- 1958 International Art of a New Era: Informel and Gutai, Takashimaya Department Store, Osaka, and four other cities in Japan
- 1958 The Gutai Group Exhibition / 6th Gutai Art Exhibition, Martha Jackson Gallery, New York and four other American cities
- 1959 8th Gutai Art Exhibition, Kyoto Municipal Museum of Art/ Ohara Hall, Tokyo
- 1963 Solo exhibition, Gutai Pinacotheca, Osaka
- 1964 14th Gutai Art Exhibition, Takashimaya Department Store, Osaka
- 1965 15th Gutai Art Exhibition, Gutai Pinacotheca, Osaka
- 1968 20th Gutai Art Exhibition, Gutai Pinacotheca, Osaka
- 1971 Saburo Murakami Box (Hako) One-Man Show, Mori's Form, Osaka
- 1973 Murakami Saburo Solo Exhibition, Gallery Shunjūkan, Osaka
- 1973 Murakami Saburo Exhibition, Mugensha, Osaka
- 1974 Murakami Saburo Exhibition, Shinanobashi Gallery Apron, Osaka
- 1975 Murakami Saburo Kakikuke solo show (Kakikuke koten), Gallery Seiwa, Osaka
- 1976 Murakami Saburo Exhibition, Shinanobashi Gallery Apron, Osaka
- 1977 Murakami Saburo Exhibition: Displeasure by the principle of identity (Jidōritsu no fukai), Galerie Kitano Circus, Kobe
- 1979 Jirō Yoshihara and Today's Aspects of the Gutai, Hyōgo Prefectural Museum of Modern Art, Kobe
- 1983 Dada in Japan. Japanische Avantgarde 1920-1970. Eine Fotodokumentation, Kunstmuseum Düsseldorf
- 1986 Group Gutai: Action and Painting / Grupo Gutai. Pintura y acción, Hyōgo Prefectural Museum of Modern Art, Kobe, Museo Español De Arte Contemporaneo, Madrid
- 1986 Japon des avant-gardes 1910–1970, Musée National d'Art Moderne, Centre Georges Pompidou, Paris
- 1990 Giappone all'avangardia: Il Gruppo Gutai negli anni cinquanta, Galleria Nazionale d'Arte Moderna, Rome
- 1991 Gutai: Japanische Avantgarde / Gutai: Japanese Avant-Garde 1954–1965, Mathildenhöhe, Darmstadt
- 1992 Gutai I: 1954–1958, Ashiya City Museum of Art & History, Kobe
- 1993 Passaggio a Oriente, 45th Venice Biennale, Venice
- 1993 Gutaï...suite?, Palais des arts, Toulouse
- 1993 Gutai 1955/56: A Restarting Point for Japanese Contemporary Art, Penrose Institute of Contemporary Arts, Tokyo, Kirin Plaza, Osaka
- 1993 MUSIC / every sound includes music, Xebec Foyer, Kobe
- 1994 Japanese Art after 1945: Scream Against the Sky, Guggenheim Museum SoHo, New York and other venues
- 1994 Hors limites: L'art et la vie 1952–1994, Centre Georges Pompidou, Paris
- 1994 One Day Museum: Feeling from seeing, Kawanishi City Hall, Hyōgo
- 1996 Saburo Murakami Exhibition, Ashiya City Museum of Art & History, Ashiya
- 1998 Out of Actions: Between Performance and the Object 1949–1979, The Museum of Contemporary Art, Los Angeles; Museum of Contemporary Art, Tokyo, and other venues.
- 1999 Gutaï, Galerie nationale du Jeu de Paume, Paris
- 2001 Le tribù dell'arte, Galleria Comunale d'Arte Moderna e Contemporanea, Rome
- 2004 Gutai Retrospective, Hyōgo Prefectural Museum of Art, Kobe
- 2004 Traces: Body and Idea in Contemporary Art, The National Museum of Modern Art, Kyoto; The National Museum of Modern Art, Tokyo
- 2006 ZERO: Internationale Künstler-Avantgarde der 50er/60er Jahre, Museum Kunst Palast, Düsseldorf/ Musée d'Art Moderne de Saint-Étienne
- 2007 Artempo: Where Time Becomes Art, Palazzo Fortuny, Venice
- 2009 Fare mondi, 53rd Venice Bienniale, Venice
- 2010 Gutai: Dipingere con il tempo e lo spazio / Gutai: Painting in Time and Space, Museo Cantonale d'Arte, Lugano, Parco Villa Ciani, Lugano
- 2011 Saburo Murakami: Focus on the 70s, ARTCOURT Gallery, Osaka
- 2012 Gutai: The Spirit of an Era, The National Art Center, Tokyo
- 2012 Destroy the Picture: Painting the Void, 1949–1962, The Museum of Contemporary Art, Los Angeles/ The Museum of Contemporary Art, Chicago
- 2012 TOKYO 1955–1970: A New Avant-Garde, The Museum of Modern Art, New York
- 2013 Parallel Views: Italian and Japanese Art from the 1950s, 60s, and 70s, The Warehouse, Rachofsky Collection, Dallas
- 2013 Gutai: Splendid Playground, Solomon R. Guggenheim Museum, New York
- 2014 Saburo Murakami, ARTCOURT Gallery, Osaka
- 2016 Performing for the Camera, Tate Modern, London
- 2016 The Emergence of Contemporary: Avant-Garde Art in Japan, 1950–1970, Paço Imperial, Rio de Janeiro
- 2016 A Feverish Era: Art Informel and the Expansion of Japanese Artistic Expression in the 1950s and '60s, The National Museum of Modern Art, Kyoto, Palais de Beaux-Arts, Brussels
- 2017 Japanese Art of the 1950s: Starting Point after the War, The Museum of Modern Art, Hayama
- 2017 Saburo Murakami, ARTCOURTGallery, Osaka
- 2017 Saburo Murakami, Axel Vervoordt Gallery, Wijnegem
- 2018 Gutai 1953–59, Fergus McCaffrey, New York
- 2018 Gutai, L'espace et le temps, Musée Soulages, Rodez
- 2019 The Yamamura Collection: Gutai and the Japanese Avant-Garde 1950s–1980s, Hyogo Prefectural Museum of Art, Kobe
