= Jiro Yoshihara =

Japanese painter and businessman

Jiro Yoshihara 吉原 治良
- Born: January 1, 1905; Osaka
- Died: February 10, 1972 (aged 67); Ashiya
- Known for: Painting
- Movement: Gutai group

Jirō Yoshihara (吉原 治良, Yoshihara Jirō; January 1, 1905 – February 10, 1972) was a Japanese painter, art educator, curator, and businessman.

Mainly known for his gestural abstract impasto paintings from the 1950s and Zen-painting inspired hard-edge Circles beginning in the 1960s, Yoshihara's oeuvre also encompasses drawings, murals, sculptures, calligraphy, ink wash paintings, ceramics, watercolors, and stage design.

Yoshihara was a key figure of postwar Japanese art and culture through his work as painter, art educator, promoter of the arts, and networker between the arts, commerce, and industry in the Kansai region and beyond, and, especially, as the leader of the postwar avant-garde art collective Gutai Art Association, which he co-founded in 1954. Under Yoshihara's guidance, Gutai explored radically experimental approaches, including outdoor exhibitions, performances, onstage presentations, and interactive works. Fueled by Yoshihara's global ambitions, Gutai developed artistic strategies to communicate internationally and insert themselves into a globalizing art world.

Aside from his artistic activities, Yoshihara was involved in the management and direction of his family's cooking oil business Yoshihara Oil Mill, Ltd.

== Biography ==
=== Early life and career ===
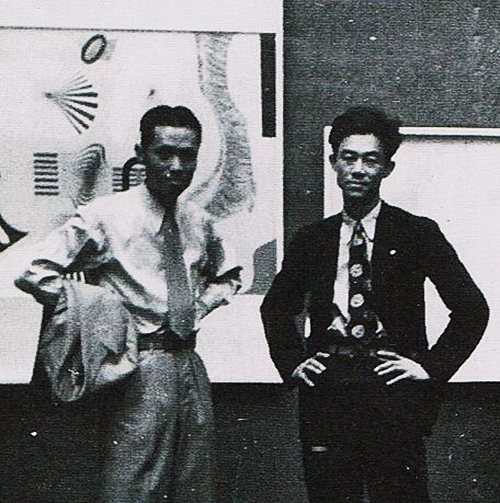
24th Nika Exhibition venue with Saburo Hasegawa (left) and Jiro Yoshihara (right), September 1937

Born in Osaka in 1905 as the second son of a vegetable oil wholesaler, Yoshihara grew up in the wealthy and refined cosmopolitan environment. (After his older brother's death in 1914, he became the future heir of the family business.

Yoshihara showed artistic talent and interest in painting as a child, acquiring his skill in oil painting auto-didactically. He was deeply impressed by the humanist idealism of the literary movement of Shirakabaha (White Birch Society), which also promoted post-Impressionist artists such as Cézanne, Van Gogh, and Renoir. Yoshihara attended the Kitano Secondary School in Osaka and studied commerce at the Kwansei Gakuin University's business college.

After contracting tuberculosis in 1925, Yoshihara moved to Ashiya and became acquainted with Ashiya-based artists such as the established painter Jirō Kamiyama, who taught Yoshihara about European culture and art, and Saburō Hasegawa, who became a friend and comrade-in-arms in promoting abstract art. Yoshihara later recalled that Kamiyama had told him that “originality and personality are the most important things.”

Yoshihara participated in the exhibitions of the painters’ group Sōenkai (Grass Garden Group), and in 1926 became a member of the Kwansei Gakuin University's painting club Gengetsukai (Crescent Moon Group). His first solo exhibition of oil paintings took place in 1928.

Facilitated by Kamiyama, Yoshihara met painters Seiji Tōgō in 1928 and Tsuguharu Fujita in 1929 during their stopovers in Kobe on their return from their yearlong stays in Europe. Fujita's observation that Yoshihara's works showed too much influence of other artists left a lasting impact, urging him to pursue originality. Recognizing Yoshihara's talent, Fujita encouraged him to study painting in Paris, but Yoshihara ultimately gave up on this plan at his father's objection. In 1929, Yoshihara married Chiyo Okuda, with whom he had four sons. In the same year, Yoshihara quit Kwansei Gakuin University's graduate course and joined his family's business. Yoshihara worked as an auditor, then as a board director beginning in 1941, and in 1955 became president of Yoshihara Oil Mill, Ltd.

In the 1920s Yoshihara created paintings, among them still-lives, which merged the influences of French post-impressionism and early Japanese modern oil painting. In the early 1930s he adopted a style that reflected that of Giorgio de Chirico. Beginning in 1934 Yoshihara showed works in the exhibitions of Nika-kai (Second Section Society, commonly known as Nika).

Around 1936, Yoshihara began experimenting with the visual language of organic and geometric abstraction, inspired by European and British abstract artists. In 1938, together with other avant-garde members of Nika who were pursuing abstraction and Surrealism, Yoshihara founded the Kyūshitsukai (Room Nine Society), which organized its own exhibitions. Following the Japanese government's intensification of its war efforts in Asia in the late 1930s and its anti-communist and anti-liberal oppression measures, which also affected artists, Kyūshitsukai ceased all activities in 1943. In 1944, Yoshihara, spared from military service due to a recurrence of tuberculosis, evacuated to Ōzōchō, Hyōgo Prefecture.

=== Early postwar years, 1945–1955 ===
After the end of World War II, Yoshihara immediately engaged in rebuilding the art scene and cultural life in the Kansai region and beyond. Beginning around 1946, he also created designs for posters, products, window displays, and murals, as well as stage sets for operettas, dance performances, open-air concerts, theater productions, and fashion shows.

Yoshihara was actively involved in the rebuilding of Nika in 1945. He attended meetings of the Tensekikai (Group of Rolling Stones) led by philosopher Tsutomu Ijima, co-founded artists groups such as the Han-bijutsu Kyōkai (Pan-Art Association), the Nihon Avangyarudo Bijutsuka Kurabu (Avant-Garde Artists Club Japan) in 1947, the Ashiya City Art Association in 1948 (a local umbrella group that hosted its own local salon, Ashiya City Exhibition), and the Nihon Absutorakuto Āto Kurabu (Abstract Art Club Japan) and Āto Kurabu (Art Club) in 1953.

He also participated in educational activities, mentoring young artists at his home or, from 1949 to 1958, at the Osaka Shiritsu Bijutsu Kenkyūjo (Osaka Art Research Institute, an art school affiliated with Municipal Art Museum). As an established member of the art world, he served as a juror for children's and students’ art exhibitions, such as Dōbiten (Children Art Exhibition, originally Jidō sōsaku bitsuten Children's Creative Art Exhibition) and Bi’ikuten (Art Education Exhibition), and collaborating with the children's poetry magazine Kirin (Giraffe).

Together with artists such as Shigeru Ueki, Kokuta Suda, Makoto Nakamura, in 1952 Yoshihara founded Gendai Bijutsu Kondankai (Contemporary Art Discussion Group, commonly known as Genbi), an interdisciplinary forum for Kansai-based artists, critics, scholars and experts to engage in interdisciplinary thematic discussion sessions and joint exhibitions. Among the participants were painters, sculptors, industrial, product and fashion designers, photographers, and in particular avant-garde artists from the traditional arts, such as calligraphy, ceramics, and ikebana, which encompassed members of Bokujinkai (Ink People Society), Sōdeisha (Running Mud Association), Shikōkai (Four Plowmen Group), and the Ohara, Sōgetsu, and Mishō ikebana schools. They shared a strong global aspiration and an enthusiasm for modern abstract art. In addition, Yoshihara participated in roundtable discussions of Bokujinkai and the Ohara school, contributed texts and illustrations to their publications (including Bokubi), and benefitted from the artistic exchanges they hosted with European and US-American abstract painters such as Pierre Soulages, Jackson Pollock, and others.

=== Gutai Art Association, 1955–1972 ===
In 1954 Yoshihara co-founded the Gutai Bijutsu Kyōkai (Gutai Art Association) with some of his students and young Genbi participants (Masatoshi Masanobu, Shōzō Shimamoto, Chiyū Uemae, Tsuruko Yamazaki, Toshio Yoshida, his son Michio Yoshihara, and Hideo Yoshihara). The founding of Gutai coincided with Yoshihara's appointment to managing director of Yoshihara Oil Mill company following his father's death in December 1954. Gutai's namesake journal, which was first issued in January 1955, documented the group's activities in 14 issues through 1965, reviving his aspiration with Kyūshitsukai's publication and emulating Bokujinkai's strategy of international networking via its magazine. Over the following months, the group underwent substantial changes. More than half of the founding members left, some frustrated by Yoshihara's prioritization of the journal over actual exhibitions. However, Gutai also gained new members in response to Yoshihara's invitation: they included Akira Kanayama, Saburō Murakami, Atsuko Tanaka, and Kazuo Shiraga, who belonged to a small artist group Zerokai (Zero Society) and also affiliated with Shinseisaku Kyōkai (New Creations Association). Yoshihara and the group also recruited Sadamasa Motonaga, Yasuo Sumi and Yōzō Ukita, who also joined later in 1955.

Over the next 18 years, Gutai semi-regularly organized Gutai Art Exhibitions and other art exhibitions under Yoshihara's leadership, including unconventional formats of outdoor exhibitions and onstage presentations. Adapting to these unconventional formats, the Gutai members, including Yoshihara himself, explored radically experimental methods of production and presentation, involving performative, ephemeral, and interactive elements. For Gutai's outdoor exhibitions and onstage presentations, Yoshihara contributed several interactive works and installations. Although the group was based on an egalitarian structure, Yoshihara was its de facto leader and spokesperson: he wrote the group's “Gutai Art Manifesto” in 1956 in response to the hype on Informel painting in Japan—and made final decisions on its projects, the works to be included in Gutai's exhibitions, and how they were presented. In his teaching, Yoshihara would refer to sources from his extensive library of around 6,500 art-related publications that he had collected over the years and included numerous foreign-language art catalogues and magazines. Yet, although his judgments were based on his profound and extensive theoretical knowledge on art, while eschewing overly intellectual and explicatory wordy approaches to art. Yoshihara's guidance often merely consisted of a "yes" or "no" when works were presented to him. He also urged his members to never imitate other artists and to always "create what has never been done before".

Yoshihara's global ambition took a more concrete form when Gutai began its international collaboration with the French art critic Michel Tapié, the promoter of European Informel painting. In 1958 Yoshihara travelled to New York to present a Gutai exhibition advised by Tapié at the Martha Jackson Gallery, and subsequently visited Europe. Other international collaborations of Gutai followed, such as exhibitions in galleries and art spaces in Paris and Turin. A new phase of Gutai began in 1962 when the group's own exhibition space, Gutai Pinacotheca, opened in storehouses owned by the Yoshihara family on the Nakanoshima island in the heart of Osaka. The Pinacotheca became a must-visit spot for artists, art critics, and curators from all over the world. Around this time, Yoshihara began to reorient Gutai In part to free Gutai from the grip of Informel by engaging in new collaborations and actively recruiting new younger members to bring new artistic approaches. In 1965, Gutai was invited to participate in NUL 1965, an exhibition at the Stedelijk Museum in Amsterdam, to which Yoshihara travelled with his son Michio.

=== Solo career, 1955–1972 ===
Yoshihara had been recognized as one of the seminal Japanese painters of the early 1950s, with many of his works both from the early postwar period and his Gutai period included in major national and international contemporary art exhibitions. For example, in 1952, his works were selected for the Salon de Mai in Paris the Pittsburgh International Exhibition of Contemporary Painting and Sculpture at the Carnegie Museum. He received the Osaka Prefectural Cultural Award in 1951. Yoshihara's paintings were subsequently shown at the Nihon Kokusai Bijutsuten (International Art Exhibition Japan) since 1952, Nichibei Chūshō Bijutsuten (Abstract Art Exhibition: Japan and USA) at the National Museum of Modern Art in Tokyo in 1955, the Pittsburgh International Exhibitions of Contemporary Painting and Sculpture at Carnegie Institute in 1958 and 1961, and Japanische Malerei der Gegenwart that travelled the German cities Berlin, Essen, and Frankfurt in 1961. He was awarded the Hyogo Prefecture Cultural Prize in 1963. However, the pressure of producing new, original artworks increased and was complicated by Yoshihara's lack of time due to his work for his family's business, as well as by the critical and commercial success of the first-generation Gutai members and the freedom of the younger members.

His Circle series, which he developed from 1962 onward, gained him renewed national and international recognition, with continued exposures including the Contemporary Japanese Painting & Sculpture exhibition that travelled through several cities in the US in 1963, the Guggenheim International Award in 1964, the Contemporary Japanese Art exhibition at the Corcoran Gallery in Washington in 1964, The New Japanese Painting and Sculpture show at the San Francisco Museum of Art and other venues in 1965, the Japan Art Festivals from 1966 to 1968, and were awarded the gold medal at the 2nd India Triennial World Art in 1971.

=== Death ===
Yoshihara died in Ashiya on February 10, 1972, due to a subarachnoid hemorrhage. Forllowing his death, Gutai dissolved in March 1972. Yoshihara was posthumously awarded the Order of the Rising Sun, Gold Rays with Rosette.

== Work ==
=== Early paintings, 1920s to mid-1930s ===
Yoshihara's paintings from the 1920s and early 1930s consisted in still-lives inspired by European Baroque still-lives and landscapes, post-impressionist painting, and Japanese oil painters such as Yuichi Takahashi. Around 1930, his paintings, which often depicted maritime motifs, adopted a visual language that echoed Giorgio De Chirico's metaphysical paintings. In the following years Yoshihara developed a Surrealist style, painting landscapes that were disintegrated and distorted, which prefigured his transition to abstraction.

=== First abstract phase, mid-1930s to 1940 ===
Around 1934, Yoshihara began creating organically geometric abstract paintings—arrangements of rectangular fields containing biomorphic forms—and experimented with techniques such as collage and montage. Yoshihara's works from the latter half of the 1930s show a broad range of styles. Some of his abstract paintings produced between 1936 and 1938 referred stylistically to works by European and British abstract artists such as Hans Erni, Naum Gabo, Jean Hélion, Arthur Jackson, Fernand Léger, and Ben Nicholson of the 1930s, which Yoshihara might have seen in European publications. He also made Surrealist collages. Works he showed at the Kyūshitsukai exhibitions consisted of abstract canvasses covered with layers of smeared and spread oil paint, in which Yoshihara experimented with different textures as well as with the tools and methods used for its application, anticipating his postwar abstract canvases.

=== War years, 1940–1945 ===
In the late 1930s, the Japanese government intensified war efforts in Asia and increased pressure on artists to contribute patriotic works. Avant-garde artists, especially those engaging in Surrealism, were threatened by these oppressive measures. Yoshihara, who was spared from military service and evacuated, struggled with the state's demands to deliver war paintings, and seclusively created Surrealistic landscapes and genre paintings.

=== Return to figuration, 1946–1950 ===
In the years following the end of World War II, Yoshihara produced paintings depicting blurred human faces, bodies, and birds, with the fore- and backgrounds blending into one another, many of which were segmented by rigid grid of lines. Around 1948, the human bodies and faces were increasingly distorted and fragmented into geometric forms, and with Yoshihara's reduction of the backgrounds to black monochrome surfaces, appeared archaic.

=== Postwar abstraction, 1950–1954 ===
After 1950 Yoshihara continued to pursue this archaic, sandy and sign-like imagery with regard to the surface texture, now scratching the contour lines of his motifs into thick paint layers. In a further step towards abstraction, Yoshihara created paintings with geometric archaic sign-like figures on monochrome opaque backgrounds, and later transitioned to purely abstract compositions of lines and planar forms, which transitioned into each other.

In his exploration of abstraction in these years, Yoshihara drew inspiration from the expressivity of non-figurative children's art, Zen calligraphy and painting, particularly the works of the 20th century Zen priest Nakahara Nantenbō, which Yoshihara saw at the Kaiseiji Temple in Nishinomiya, and his exchanges with the avantgarde-calligraphers Shiryū Morita and Yuichi Inoue in the early 1950s, and US-American abstract artists. Yoshihara's growing interest in lines has also been associated with the artist's visit to Gendai sekai bijutusten in Tokyo 1950, which included recent works by European abstract artists such as Hans Hartung and Pierre Soulages, his exchange with calligraphers, and his interest in US-American abstract expressionist painting, in particular the works of Jackson Pollock. When Pollock's paintings were first shown in Japan in original in the 3rd Yomiuri Independent Exhibition in 1951/1952, Yoshihara was one of the first and few voices to acknowledge and praise the newness and originality of Pollock and US-American art against the mainstream view shaped by Tokyo critics. Though inspired by calligraphy and Pollock, Yoshihara sought his own ways to overcome the limitations he encountered, whether it was the restrictions of the genre of calligraphy, e.g. the legibility of the written characters, or, through his study of Pollock's work, the limits of canvas painting.

=== Informel phase and Gutai works, 1955–1962 ===
Coinciding with the early years of Gutai, Yoshihara, from 1955 to the early 1960s, a period that is often described as his Informel phase, intensified his exploration of the materiality of paint and created paintings applying several layers of oil paint with traces of dynamic gestural paint application. These works emerged from the synergy with Gutai and its activities, including Gutai's experimental exhibitions as well as Gutai's collaboration with Michel Tapié.

Aside from painting, Yoshihara also contributed interactive three-dimensional works and installations for Gutai's outdoor exhibitions and stage shows, such as his Light Art (1956), which were columns with lamps, Rakugakiban (Please draw freely) (1956), a board on which visitors were invited to scribble, or Muro (Room) (1956), a labyrinth walk-in installation.

=== Circles and hard edge, 1962–1972 ===
Around 1962, Yoshihara began work on a series of paintings of singular circles on monochromatic backgrounds, inspired both by ensō circles from Zen painting and hard-edge painting of the 1960s. He was impressed by the powerful calligraphy of Zen monk Nantenbō and Nantenbō's own creations of ensō, circles symbolizing enlightenment in Zen. Yet, while ensō were painted in one stroke in ink on paper, Yoshihara's circles were applied in oil or acrylic paint. As Reiko Tomii hints, “This deliberate maneuver resulted in a form neither East nor West, sublimating the calligraphic gesture that he so admired in Pollock and Nantebō and the minimalism that brought out the best of his formalism.” These new circle paintings finally resulted in a renewed success for Yoshihara: Painting was selected for the 1964 Guggenheim International Award, and for White Circle on Black and Black Circle on White he was awarded the gold medal at the 2nd India Triennial World Art in 1971.

=== Other works ===
Throughout his life, Yoshihara was committed to interdisciplinary collaboration aside from his paintings. From the beginning of his artistic career, he contributed illustrations to poetry magazines and children's books. After the end of World War II, he went on to create murals, posters, advertisements, product designs, shop window displays, and stage designs for operettas, dance performances, theater pieces, concerts, fashion shows in the Kansai region. These included donchō stage drop curtains, as well as stage designs for the fashion designer Chiyo Tanaka between 1952 and 1954, and stage designs for Festival Noh from 1962 until his death. Yoshihara was also a prolific writer and contributed reviews and articles to newspapers and art magazines.

== Reception and legacy ==
Yoshihara substantially shaped the course of postwar Japanese art, both as an artist in his own right and as a facilitator of new experimental art. As an artist, he left an extensive oeuvre that underwent development through a broad range of stylistic phases. On the basis of Yoshihara's profound practical and theoretical knowledge of Japanese and Western arts, his works engaged with both Japanese traditional arts and modern painting as well as the most up-to-date global artistic developments, and, through his continuous pursuit of new art, sought to overcome their boundaries and limitations.

Through his involvement with children's art exhibitions and children's books and magazines, Yoshihara contributed to the revaluation of children's art in Japan in the postwar years and the broader recognition/acceptance of a liberal art educational approach that fostered radically free expressive creativity, in opposition to the widely spread training approach.

Projects that Yoshihara co-founded and engaged in became forceful factors for the vitalization of the arts and culture in the Kansai region. Genbi, for instance, inspired the participating established and emerging artists to push the boundaries of their arts. Other initiatives turned out to be long-lasting and influential events, such as the Dōbiten (Children Art Exhibition), which continues to provide a venue for free creative art by children, or Ashiya City Art Association's Ashiyashiten (Ashiya City Exhibitions), which became an important venue for generations of vanguard artists across the Kansai region.

His most influential achievement is Gutai, which Yoshihara led and held together with his artistic instinct, organizational and strategic savviness for 18 years, and which became a fixture in Japanese as well as global art history. Yoshihara actively identified new members with artistic potential, and facilitated and encouraged radically experimental works from its members that anticipated the approaches later adopted or paralleled by European and US-American artists in the 1960s and 1970s. Fueled by his global ambition to achieve “international common ground”, i.e., to be internationally recognized by contemporaries worldwide, Yoshihara used and encouraged artistic, communicative and promotional strategies to help Gutai become one of the most internationally known Japanese postwar art groups. Although criticized for its too close collaboration with Tapié and Informel or the group's reticence from overtly socio-politically critical statements, Yoshihara was instrumental in making Gutai an unprecedented case in Japanese art history as a Japanese art group that directly and actively involved in global art discourses.
