= Tsuruko Yamazaki =

Japanese visual artist (1925–2019)

- Born: 1925
- Died: June 12, 2019; aged 94
- Style: Avant-garde
- Movement: Gutai group

Tsuruko Yamazaki (山崎 つる子, Yamazaki Tsuruko; 1925 – June 12, 2019) was a Japanese artist, known for her bold artistic experiments with abstract visual styles and non-traditional materials. She was a co-founder and the longest-standing female member of the Gutai Art Association, an avant-garde artists' collective established by Jirō Yoshihara.

== Biography ==
Yamazaki was born in 1925 in Ashiya, Hyōgo, Japan. In 1947, she attended a three-day summer art workshop directed by Yoshihara. Impressed by Yoshihara's radically novel approach to art, Yamazaki began studying with him and eventually became a member of Gutai upon its establishment under his leadership.

Yamazaki had been an active member of the Gutai group since its founding in 1954. She regularly participated in Gutai's Outdoor Exhibitions, performance events, and Gutai Art Exhibitions. As Gutai gradually garnered interest in the international art world, Yamazaki showed her works at Martha Jackson Gallery, New York (1958) and the Stedelijk Museum, Amsterdam (1965). Later she showed with the former Gutai members at the 45th and 53rd Venice Biennale (1993 and 2009). Her first solo exhibition was held in 1963 at the Gutai Pinacotheca, the exhibition space of Gutai opened by Yoshihara in 1962. She later received solo exhibitions at Ashiya City Museum of Art and History (2004), Galerie Almine Rech in Paris (2010), and Take Ninagawa in Tokyo (2013 and 2015).

Yamazaki remained a member of Gutai until its dissolution in 1972. Her artistic creation continued to evolve afterwards, exploring styles and motifs inspired by Pop Art. She died of pneumonia on June 12, 2019, at the age of 94. She is credited for being a "pivotal figure in the Japanese avant-garde movement."

== Artworks ==
Yamazaki was known for her daring use of saturated colors and abstract visual languages. She was also interested in unconventional materials like tinplate, mirrors, and vinyl. Eschewing figurative and literal representations, her early works often highlighted the specific chemical and physical properties of these materials, responding to Yoshihara's assertion that: 'Gutai Art does not alter matter [...] Gutai Art does not distort matter. In Gutai Art, the human spirit and matter shake hands with each other while keeping their distance. Matter never compromises itself with spirit; spirit never dominates matter.'

Reflective materials played a significant role in Yamazaki's early works. At 'The First Gutai Art Exhibition' in 1955, Yamazaki displayed Tin Cans, a sculpture made from stacking some 25 tin cans on the floor of the exhibition space. The artist recycled the cans discarded by American servicemen in Osaka and varnished them fluorescent pink. Reflecting, tinting, and distorting the surroundings, the pile of pink tin cans captured the mesmerizing visual shock brought by Western consumer goods, urbanization, and technological development in post-war Japan. The blurry reflections on the surface of the tins also viewers to contemplate the physical space.

At the same exhibition, Yamazaki also exhibited Work (1955), a large iron panel covered by black and white stripes. At the four edges of the panel, Yamazaki mounted small rectangular mirrors, which reflected viewers’ bodies and the exhibition space in fragments. The uninterrupted reflection challenged viewers to reconsider the very act of 'viewing' and viewing subjects' taken-for-granted control over art objects.

In another work, Three-Sided Mirror (1956), Yamazaki again used pink tinplate. The work consisted of thirty-six sheets of tinplate, which were assembled into three enormous reflective panels like a triptych mirror. Exhibited at the Outdoor Gutai Art Exhibition at Ashiya Park, the striking color of the tin triptych disrupted the harmonious greenery of the park. On its slightly dented surface, the reflection of surrounding trees and passers-by deformed into eerie and barely recognizable shapes. Like a funhouse mirror, the work reframed and defamiliarized the world to challenge viewers' habitual perception of it.

Yamazaki's installation created for 'Gutai Group Room' at the Shinko Independent Exhibition in 1956 similarly aimed at redefining how viewers see the world. The installation was a crumpled sheet of orange-red cellophane, which Yamazaki hang over the entrance to the Gutai Group Room. The wrinkled cellophane sheet refracted light, distorted the view into the room, and cast a colored glow over the space. It called for a departure from conventional and accepted vantage points of viewing the world, prompting viewers to look and experience differently.

Her work Red (1956), exhibited at the 'Outdoor Gutai Art Exhibition', was a large cubic tent suspended by strings attached to nearby trees. The tent was made of red vinyl sheets stretched over a wooden frame. The tent was illuminated from the inside at night, glowing in the darkness. Viewers were attracted to bend under the edge of the tent and enter. Once inside, their bodies were entirely bathed in the red glow of the installation, merging into an unfamiliar and fantastic space of art. Meanwhile, viewers outside the tent observed flimsy shadows of deformed human shapes that floated on the red vinyl sheets. As the shapes and sizes of the shadows changed constantly, the work provoked a curious experience of unease and unfamiliarity. Different versions of this work were also featured in a number of exhibits afterwards, including at the Hyōgo Prefectural Museum of Art; at the Guggenheim Museum in New York.

In 1957, Yamazaki pushed further her experiments with tinplate. At 'The 3rd Gutai Art Exhibition' (1957), she showed a series of tinplate panels which she had hammered and perforated. Protruding and concaving irregularly, the panels looked like abstract metal reliefs. Yamazaki used color-gel lights to underscore further the metallic texture and the uneven surface of the works. The manipulated surfaces highlighted the materiality and three-dimensionality of tin panels, echoing Gutai's shared interest in physical materials. At the same time, the dazzlingly colorful gleams again evoked the visual experience of the luminosity of movie screens, televisions, pachinko machines, and neon lights – increasingly prevalent objects in the prospering urban space of 1950s Japan. For 'The 4th Gutai Art Exhibition', held in the same year in Tokyo, Yamazaki created a group of tin works by pouring and dripping aniline dye and varnish onto tinplate panels. Flowing and streaking freely on the surface of the panels, the bright and semi-transparent dyes complicated the reflective texture of tin, creating a complex interplay of colors, lights, and reflections.

Yamazaki's visual vocabulary in the 1960s and 70s gradually assimilated elements from Pop Art. Rather than continuing the earlier gestural abstraction, she created kitschy works with highly luminous colors and eye-dazzling patterns. Pop-inspired motifs such as speech bubbles and polka dots also began to appear in her paintings from this period. After Gutai disbanded in 1972, Yamazaki started incorporating more figural motifs like images of animals and advert posters. In a 2009 series titled Ukiyoe: Hell of Color, she reworked readymade Ukiyoe prints by covering them with patches and strokes of bright paints. Since the late 1990s, Yamazaki had returned to her earlier exploration of tinplate, creating abstract paintings with liquid dye on tin panels.

== Kirin and children's art education ==
In addition to her own art creation, Yamazaki devoted herself to reforming children's art education. For Kirin, a postwar children's poetry magazine published in Osaka, Yamazaki and other Gutai members wrote over 60 articles to advocate reformed modes of children's art education that would encourage creativity and independent thinking. For example, her 1956 article 'Extremely Interesting' discussed the importance of originality and creativity as the source of an 'interesting' life. Her involvement in children's art education continued until 2011.

== Exhibition ==
=== Solo exhibitions ===
1963 - Gutai Pinacotheca, Osaka

1967 - Gallery Pettit Imabashi, Osaka

1973 - Fujimi Gallery, Osaka

1980 - Art Space, Nishinomiya

1995, 1997, 2000, 2003, 2007 and 2009 - Lads Gallery, Osaka

1995 - Gallery Renaissance, Tokyo

2005 - Reflection: Tsuruko Yamazaki, Ashiya City Museum of Art & History

2007 - Gallery Cellar, Nagoya

2009 - Gallery Cellar, Tokyo

2010 - Tsuruko Yamazaki: Beyond Gutai 1957–2009, Galerie Almine Rech, Paris

=== Selected group exhibitions ===
==== 1955- 1960 ====
1955- Experimental Outdoor Exhibition of Modern Art to Challenge the Midsummer Sun, Ashiya Park, Hyogo

1955- 1st Gutai Art Exhibition, Ohara Hall, Tokyo

1956- Outdoor Gutai Art Exhibition, Ashiya Park, Hyogo

1956- 2nd Gutai Art Exhibition, Ohara Hall, Tokyo

1957- 3rd Gutai Art Exhibition, Kyoto Municipal Museum

1957- Gutai Art on the Stage, Sankei Hall, Osaka

1957- 4th Gutai Art Exhibition, Ohara Hall, Tokyo

1958- 5th Gutai Art Exhibition, Ohara Hall, Tokyo

1958- 2nd Gutai Art on the Stage, Sankei Hall, Osaka

1958- 6th Gutai Art Exhibition (Gutai New York Exhibition), Martha Jackson Gallery, New York and toured New England, Minneapolis, Oakland, and Huston

1959- 8th Gutai Art Exhibition, Kyoto Municipal Museum; Ohara Hall, Tokyo

1960- 9th Gutai Art Exhibition and International Sky Festival, Takashimaya Department Store, Osaka

==== 1961-present ====
1961- Continuité et avant-garde au Japon, International Center for Aesthetic Research, Turin, 1961;

1965- Groupe Gutaï, Galerie Stadler, Paris,

1965- Nul 1965, Stedelijk Museum, Amsterdam,

1986- Japon des avant gardes, 1910–1970, Centre Georges Pompidou, Paris,

1990- Unfinished Avant-Garde Art Group: With a Focus on the Collection of Hyōgo Prefectural Museum of Art, The Shōtō Museum of Art, Tokyo, 1990;

1992 and 1993 - Gutai I, II, III, Ashiya City Museum of Art & History

1993- The Gutai Group 1955−56: A Restarting Point for Japanese Contemporary Art, Penrose Institute of Contemporary Arts, Tokyo

1993- Venice Biennale

2004- The 50th Anniversary of Gutai Retrospective Exhibition, Hyōgo Prefectural Museum of Art, Kobe

2009- Gutai: Painting with Time and Space, Museo Cantonale d’Arte, Lugano, Switzerland

2009- Venice Biennale

2012- Gutai: The Spirit of an Era, The National Art Center, Tokyo, 2012
