= Michel Tapié =

French painter

Michel Tapié de Céleyran (French pronunciation: [miʃɛl tapje də selɛʁɑ̃]; 26 February 1909 – 30 July 1987) was a French art critic, curator, and collector. He was an early and influential theorist and practitioner of "tachisme", a French style of abstract painting popular in the 1940s and 1950s which is regarded as a European version of abstract expressionism. Tapié was a founder member of the Compagnie de l'Art Brut with Dubuffet and Breton In 1948, as well he managed the Foyer De l'Art Brut at the Galerie René Drouin.Tapié was from an aristocratic French family and was a second cousin once removed of the painter Henri de Toulouse-Lautrec. The painter's mother Adèle Tapié de Celeyran was Tapié's great-aunt.

== Art of Another Kind ==
Michel Tapié's 1952 book entitled Un art autre (Art of Another Kind), influenced a distinctly European approach to American abstract expressionism, especially the subgenres of action painting and lyrical abstraction. Herschel B. Chipp's Theories of Modern Art: a Source Book for Artists and Critics (1968; see list of references below), includes an English translation of an extensive portion of that work (pp. 603–605). "L'art Informel" was Tapié's general term for art reflecting the sensibility described in this manifesto.

According to the Guggenheim Collection's art-historical glossary entry on "l'art informel" (see External links), Tapié, in his 1952 book, "was trying to define a tendency in postwar European painting that he saw as a radical break with all traditional notions of order and composition —including those of Modernism.... He used the term Art Informel (from the French informe, meaning unformed or formless) to refer to the antigeometric, antinaturalistic, and nonfigurative formal preoccupations of these artists, stressing their pursuit of spontaneity, looseness of form, and the irrational.... Artists who became associated with Art Informel include Enrico Donati, Lucio Fontana, Agenore Fabbri, Alberto Burri, Asger Jorn, Phillip Martin, Emil Schumacher, Kazuo Shiraga, Antoni Tàpies, and Jiro Yoshihara."

== Globe-trotting promoter of modern art ==
Chipp notes that Tapié's importance to Avant-garde art, beginning in the mid-1940s, was "not only as an author of books, criticism, and exhibition catalogues, but also as an organizer of exhibitions of contemporary art in Europe, Latin America, and Japan, and as an adviser to galleries throughout the world" (p. 591). In 1952, Tapié wrote the catalogue for, and helped to organize, Jackson Pollock’s first solo exhibition in Paris, which took place at the Studio Paul Facchetti (see Tapié's essay/catalogue listed below). The French lyrical abstractionist (or tachiste) Georges Mathieu was another artist of whom Tapié was an early champion (see catalogue below).

In 1957, Tapié travelled with Georges Mathieu to Tokyo, and later to Osaka, to meet the Gutai Group. This first encounter led to numerous collaborations between the gallerist and Gutai, including a 1958 exhibition of Gutai art at the Martha Jackson Gallery in New York, the group's first exhibition outside of Japan. Tapié also was present during Gutai's 1960 art event, "The International Sky Festival", held in Osaka. Some art historians have argued that Tapié was a negative influence on the group, encouraging the artists to pursue informel-style painting rather than their more innovative practices, such as performance and installation.

In 1960, with architect Luigi Moretti it:Luigi Moretti (architetto), Tapié co-founded the International Center of Aesthetic Research in Turin, Italy [Chipp, p. 591], a facility for the study and exhibition of art, as well as for the publication and dissemination of critical, investigative, or theoretical works on art. The Center, which closed its doors not long after the death of Tapié in 1987, also housed a museum with a permanent collection of modern and contemporary art. Tapié organized and curated scores of exhibitions of new and modern art in major cities all over the world, including not only Paris and Turin but also New York City, Rome, Tokyo, Munich, Madrid, Amsterdam, Buenos Aires, Milan, and Osaka.

== Quotation ==
In the words of Saint John of the Cross, 'To reach the unknown, you must pass through the unknown.' Academicism--finished for good, isn't it?

== See also ==
- Elaine Hamilton

== Sources ==
- Evezard, Juliette. "Un Art Autre". Le rêve de Michel Tapié, Fabrice Flahutez, Fr. preface] (Dijon: Les presses du réel, 2023), 360 p. ISBN 978-2-37896-329-3
- Chipp, Herschel B.. Theories of modern art; a source book by artists and critics (Berkeley, University of California Press, 1968)
- Le Pichon, Yann; and Jean Louis Ferrier. Art of our century : the chronicle of western art, 1900 to the present [Walter D. Glanze, English translation] (New York : Prentice Hall Editions, 1989) ISBN 0-13-011644-0, ISBN 978-0-13-011644-4 [contains extensive material concerning Tapié's Un Art Autre (1952)]
- Moretti, Luigi; Michel Tapié. Le baroque généralisé : manifeste du baroque ensembliste (Torino : Edizioni del Dioscuro, 1965) OCLC 57403312
- Tapié, Michel. Un art autre où il s'agit de nouveaux dévidages du réel (Paris, Gabriel-Giraud et fils, 1952) OCLC 1110556
- Antoni Tàpies and Michel Tapié. Antonio Tapies [sic], New York City, G. Wittenborn, 1959. OCLC 1090149 [Note: this Worldcat listing gives the painter's first name as "Antonio" in the title, also omitting the accent mark in the surname. Despite the similar surnames, the two men were unrelated.]
- Tapié, Michel; Paul Jenkins; Esther Jenkins. Observations (New York City, G. Wittenborn, 1956) OCLC 1127301
- Tapié, Michel. Elaine Hamilton: Exhibition of Paintings (Osaka, Japan: Fujikawa Gallery), April 12–18, 1961. OCLC 81011323
- Tapié, Michel. Hans Hofmann : peintures 1962 : 23 avril-18 mai 1963. (Paris: Galerie Anderson-Mayer, 1963.) [exhibition catalogue and commentary: Tapié was a great admirer of Hans Hofmann] OCLC: 62515192
- Tapié, Michel; Ossorio, Alfonso. Pollock (Paris, P. Facchetti, 1952) OCLC: 30601793
- Tapié, Michel; Instituto Torquato de di Tella. Centro de Artes Visuales. Intuiciones y realizaciones formales : exposición de obras seleccionadas por Michel Tapié, Centro de Artes Visuales, Instituto Torcuato di Tella ... Buenos Aires ... del 14 de agosto al 4 de setiembre de 1964 (Worldcat link: ) (Buenos Aires: El Instituto, 1964) OCLC 7889303
- Jirō Yoshihara; Shōzō Shimamoto; Michel Tapié; Gutai Bijutsu Kyōkai. Gutai [= 具体] (具体美術協会, Nishinomiya-shi : Gutai Bijutsu Kyōkai, 1955–1965) [Japanese : Serial Publication : Periodical] OCLC 53194339 [Worldcat "Other titles" information: Gutai art exhibition, Aventure informelle, International art of a new era, U.S.A., Japan, Europe, International Sky Festival, Osaka, 1960]
