= Atsuko Tanaka (artist) =

Japanese artist (1932–2005)

Atsuko Tanga
- Tanaka in 1957, wearing her Electric Dress
- Born: February 10, 1932; Osaka, Japan
- Died: December 3, 2005 (aged 73); Nara, Japan
- Known for: Painting, Sculpture, Performance art, Installation art

Atsuko Tanaka (田中 敦子, Tanaka Atsuko; February 10, 1932 – December 3, 2005) was a Japanese avant-garde artist. She was a central figure of the Gutai Art Association from 1955 to 1965. Her works have found increased curatorial and scholarly attention across the globe since the early 2000s, when she received her first museum retrospective in Ashiya, Japan, which was followed by the first retrospective abroad, in New York and Vancouver. Her work was featured in multiple exhibitions on Gutai art in Europe and North America.

== Biography ==
Tanaka was born in Osaka, on February 10, 1932. She had four older sisters and four older brothers. She studied at the Department of Western Painting at Kyoto Municipal College of Art (now Kyoto City University of Arts) in 1950 and left to attend the Art Institute of Osaka Municipal Museum of Art from 1951.

During her study at college, Tanaka befriended her upperclassman Akira Kanayama. Kanayama advised her to explore new artistic languages and later invited her to join an artists' collective, Zero Society (Zero-kai), which he co-founded with other young artists, including Kazuo Shiraga and Saburo Murakami.

During an extended period of hospitalization in 1953, Tanaka started to create non-figurative artworks. Inspired by the calendar with which she counted days, Tanaka began to make a series of works that consisted of handwritten numbers on various collaged materials, including hemp cloth, tracing paper, and newspaper. In some of these works, Tanaka repeated and fragmented the numbers to de-naturalize the meaning of numerical signs.

In 1955, Tanaka, Kanayama, and other members of Zero Society joined the Gutai Art Association, an avant-garde artists' group led by artist Yoshihara Jiro. After joining Gutai, Tanaka created several iconic works such as Electric Dress (1956), Work (Bell, 1956), and Work (Pink Rayon, 1955) that earned both public attention and positive responses from art critics. She also performed Stage Cloth (1957) at Gutai Art on the Stage, an event held by Gutai at the Sankei Hall in Osaka.

As Tanaka's solo artistic career soared throughout the late 50s and early 60s, her relationship with Yoshihara Jiro became strained. Due to her mental instability and the tension within the group, Tanaka decided to leave Gutai in 1965 and married Kanayama. They moved into a house at the temple Myōhōji in Osaka. She produced most of her works at home and in the flat on the second floor of her parents' house, ten minutes from where she had lived. In 1972, Tanaka and her husband moved to Nara.

In her post-Gutai period, Tanaka mainly created large paintings, applying synthetic resin enamel paints to horizontally laid canvases. She developed unique motifs of colorful circles and intertwining lines from her earlier drawings inspired by Electric Dress and Bell. Her paintings from this period continued to attract attention in Japan and from abroad.

On December 3, 2005, Tanaka died of pneumonia after a traffic accident, aged 73.

== Involvement with the Gutai movement ==
In 1952, Akira Kanayama introduced Tanaka to his colleagues in Zero-kai (Zero Society), an experimental art group he co-founded with Shiraga Kazuo and Murakumi Saburo. Tanaka soon joined this association. In the meantime, Jiro Yoshihara, an established artist and critic, was offering private lessons on Western-style oil painting. Influenced by abstract art that emerged in Tokyo, Yoshihara envisioned a new kind of art that would "create what has never been done before." In 1954, Yoshihara and other young artists, mainly like-minded students of his, founded the Gutai Art Association. Around June 1955, Yoshihara sent Gutai artist Shimamoto Shozo to invite members of Zero Society, including Tanaka, to join Gutai.

Tanaka, as well as other members of Zero Society, became central figures of Gutai after they joined. Their non-figurative artistic experiments contributed to further radicalizing Gutai art. Tanaka's works were featured in all exhibitions held by Gutai from 1955 to 1965. After she left Gutai, exhibitions in both Japan and the West continued to include her iconic works such as Bell (1955) and Electric Dress (1956) as emblematic of the experiment carried out by Gutai.

== Work ==
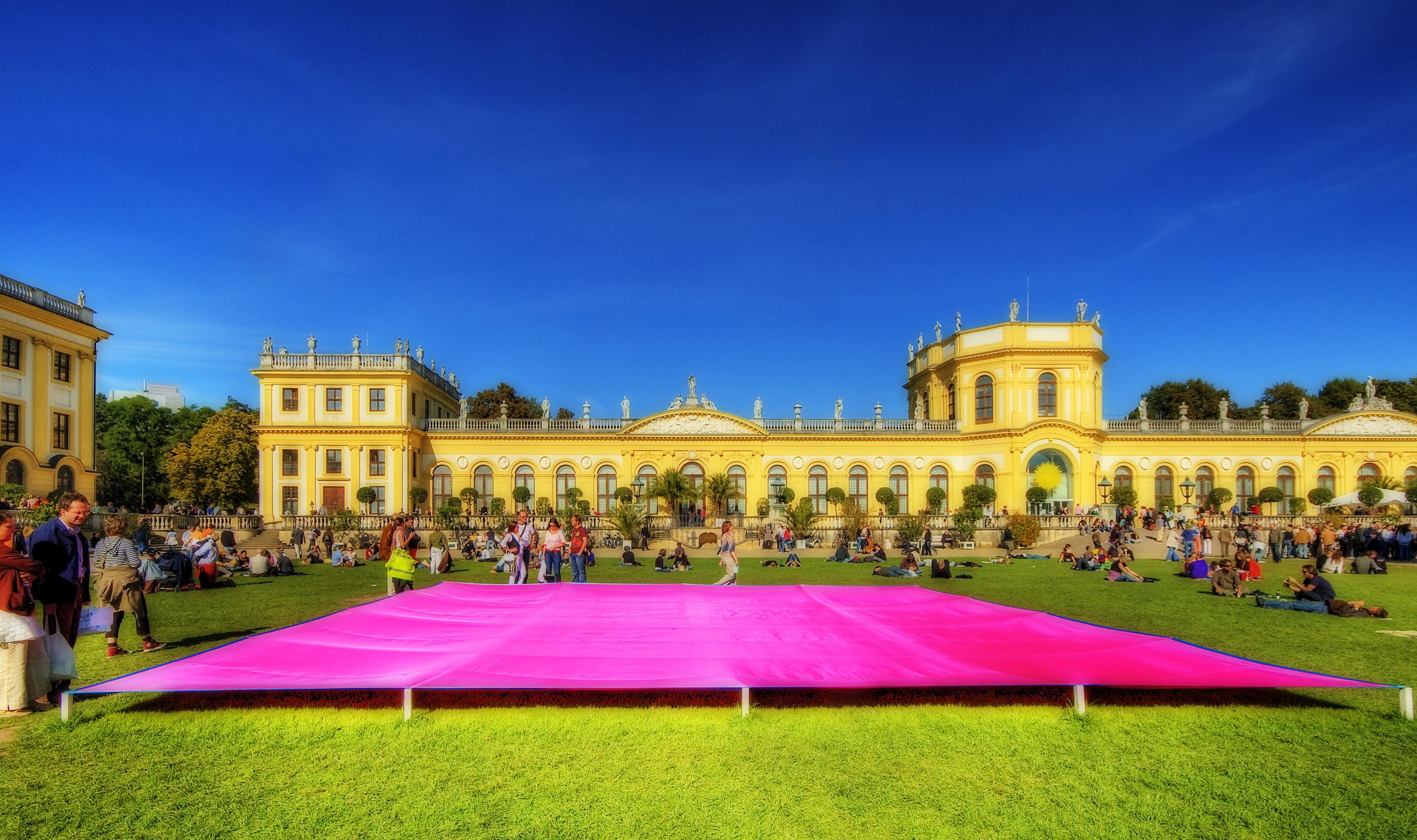
Tokyo Work (1955), reconstructed in 2007.

Tanaka's abstract paintings, sculptures, performances and installations challenged conventional notions of how works of art should appear or "perform". Her use of everyday materials, such as factory-dyed textiles, electric bells, and light bulbs revealed the artistic beauty of mundane objects.

=== Yellow Cloth (1955) ===
In Yellow Cloth, Tanaka cut three pieces of plain cotton fabric and tacked them to a gallery's wall. The fabrics gently fluttered when viewers passed by. With little intervention from the artist, the work could hardly be differentiated from ordinary mass-produced fabrics. By calling this work a "painting", Tanaka challenged the conventional definition of the word. The work unveiled the inherent beauty of materials that were free of elaborate artistic manipulations. Tanaka's Gutai colleague Sadamasa Motanaga wrote about it: "Beauty is not technique. People experience the beauty of opening cloth even in their home. The artist pointed it out as beauty. This act is very precious."

=== Bell (1955) ===
Inspired by her outdoor installation Pink Rayon (1955), Tanaka created Bell in 1955. It consisted of a string of twenty electric bells and a button with the sign "Please feel free to push the button, Atsuko Tanaka". In early versions of Bell, the bells were laid at two-meter intervals with each other to surround a gallery room. Once visitors pressed the button, it would make the bells ring in sequence for two minutes. The arrangement of the bells was adapted to different spaces at later exhibitions.

The work enabled visitors to transgress the taboos of gallery spaces by allowing them to both touch an artwork and make loud noise in a gallery. Gutai member Shiraga Fujiko's review of Bell interpreted the work as an empowering opportunity for viewers to "stand on the very edge of the act of creating" and experience the joy of making art. However, viewers also "experience[d] the terror of being responsible for yourself". Those who were triggered the ear-piercing noise experienced embarrassment and uneasiness under the watch of others. The work thus also forced viewers to reflect on the limitations of their agency and presumed control of the external world.

=== Electric Dress (1956) ===
Tanaka's well-known Electric Dress (1956) was a garment made of 200 lightbulbs that weighed over 50 kg. At the "2nd Gutai Art Exhibition" held in 1956, Tanaka wore Electric Dress and walked around in the gallery. Photographs of the performance show Tanaka covered from head to toe in the garment, with only her face and hands visible. The colored light bulbs flickered randomly, giving off the sensation of an alien creature and, according to Tanaka, "blink[ing] like fireworks."

Tanaka was inspired by dazzling neon signs in urban Osaka to create Electric Dress. The work thus reflected the changing cityscape under the rapid urbanization of post-war Japan. Simultaneously, the work confined its wearer's body and emanated menacing heat and blinding light. Tanaka herself noticed the trepidation at the moment when the electricity of the work was switched on: "I had the fleeting thought: Is this how a death-row inmate would feel?" The work visualized the power of a contraption made of industrial materials, which threatened human flesh.

The saturated colors of Electric Dress also referred to fashion and advertisements. In post-war Japan, monochromatic wartime costumes gradually gave way to bright clothes, which were manufactured, advertised, and worn widely. Additionally, dressmaking as a hobby gained popularity among Japanese women. Tanaka herself had applied to a dressmaking school and remained an amateur seamstress. By creating Electric Dress, which entrapped its wearer's body, Tanaka critically reconsidered the confinement imposed by fashion on the female body.

=== Stage Clothes (1956 performance) ===
Tanaka's performance Stage Clothes (1956) also critically engaged the issue of fashion, body, and gender. Tanaka designed a multi-layer costume with trick sleeves removeable parts. In the performance, she peeled off the layers one by one to reveal the outfits underneath. A gigantic pink dress with 9.1 m long sleeves was placed in the background behind her. Although the performance resembled a striptease show, Tanaka's expressionless face and unemotional movements refused an eroticized reading of her body and actions.

== Exhibitions and collection ==
In the 2000s, Tanaka's works were featured in numerous expositions in Japan and abroad, including at the Kyoto National Museum of Modern Art, the Nagoya Gallery HAM, the New York Grey Art Gallery and Paula Cooper Gallery as well as at the Galerie im Taxispalais in Innsbruck. The Grey Art Gallery focuses on Tanaka's Gutai period and also includes a video and documentation of the movement plus a reconstructed version of Electric Dress. In 2005, the University of British Columbia's Morris and Helen Belkin Art Gallery in Vancouver mounted a major exhibition of Tanaka's work entitled "Electrifying art: Atsuko Tanaka, 1954-1968". Electric Dress and other works were on display at the 2007 documenta 12 in Kassel. A major retrospective exhibition, "Atsuko Tanaka: The Art of Connecting", travelled to Birmingham, Castelló and Tokyo in 2011-2012.

Atsuko Tanaka's work is included in a number of internationally important public collections, including that of the Museum of Modern Art (MoMA) in New York. MoMA's online collection features a large, untitled 1964 work by Tanaka (synthetic polymer paint on canvas). Nearly 12 feet (3.7 m) tall and over 7 feet (2.1 m) wide, this piece, according to MOMA's online description, "evolved from Tanaka's performance Electric Dress", and "vividly records the artist's gestural application of layers and skeins of multicolored acrylic paint on the canvas as it lay on the floor." The Centre Pompidou in Paris, France, owns a reconstruction of Tanaka's Electric Dress made in 1999 at the occasion of a Gutai retrospective held at the Jeu de Paume. Tanaka was highlighted as a pioneer of abstraction in the exhibition Women in Abstraction, curated by Christine Macel and shown at the Centre Pompidou and the Guggenheim Bilbao in 2021.

== See also ==
- Wearable art

== Bibliography ==
- Atsuko Tanaka; Ming Tiampo; Mizuho Kato; Morris and Helen Belkin Art Gallery. Electrifying art : Atsuko Tanaka, 1954-1968 (Vancouver : Morris and Helen Belkin Art Gallery, 2004) (Worldcat link: ) ISBN 0-88865-632-7. [Please note: though WorldCat gives 2004 as the date of this book, the exhibition itself, according to the gallery's website took place from 21 January to 20 March 2005]
- Mark Stevens (2004-10-04). "Art review: Everything Is Illuminated". New York Magazine.
- Holland Cotter (2004-10-01). "Atsuko Tanaka: With Bells and Flashes, Work of a Japanese Pioneer". The New York Times.
- Atsuko Tanaka. The Art of Connecting, Jonathan Watkins, Mizuho Katō, eds., exh. cat., Ikon Gallery, Birmingham, Espai d'Art Contemporani, Castelló, The Museum of Contemporary Art Tokyo, 2011–2012 (Birmingham: Ikon Gallery, 2011).
- Namiko Kunimoto, 'The Stakes of Exposure: Anxious Bodies is Postwar Japanese Art' Minneapolis: University of Minnesota Press, 2017.
