= Akira Kanayama =

Akira Kanayama (金山明 Kanayama Akira; 1924–2006) was a Japanese avant-garde artist and an early member of The Gutai Art Association. An active contributor to Gutai's exhibitions and performance events, Kanayama was one of the pivotal figures of the group. His artworks were characterised by witty experiments with unconventional materials such as toy cars and signal lights for level crossing. He left Gutai in 1965 with Atsuko Tanaka, whom he married later in the same year.

== Biography ==
Kanayama was born in 1924 in Amagasaki, Hyogo Prefecture. He withdrew from Tama Art University in 1947 and attended the Osaka Municipal Institute of Art (an art school affiliated with Osaka City Museum of Fine Arts) instead, where he continued to study until 1954. During this period, he participated in exhibitions held by Shin Seisakuha Kyōkai (新制作協会 New Production Association). In 1952, in order to pursue more radical artistic experiments, he founded Zero Society (Zero-kai) with other young members of the Shin Seisaku Association, including Kazuo Shiraga and Saburō Murakami. Kanayama also invited Atsuko Tanaka, who was then also a student at the Osaka Municipal Art Institute. Zero Society mounted its first group exhibition in 1954.

In 1955, Kanayama and three other members of Zero Society (Shiraga, Murakami, and Tanaka) joined Gutai upon Jirō Yoshihara's invitation. During his time as a Gutai member, Kanayama significantly expanded his oeuvre by exploring diverse media and means of artistic expression. He exhibited large-scale installations at Gutai's outdoor exhibitions and playfully used remote-control toys cars to create paintings that resemble Abstract Expressionist works. He also showed two works at Gutai's performance events, 'Gutai on Stage', in 1957 and 1958.

Kanayama left Gutai in 1965 and married Tanaka. Due to Tanaka's health condition, the couple decided to move to the Myōhōji temple in Osaka for a restful environment. Kanayama took care of administrative issues for Tanaka, while her artistic career soared. The couple moved to Nara in 1972. In later decades, Kanayama continued to make art and exhibited his works in various exhibitions. He received his first solo exhibition in 1992 at Gallery Kuranuki in Osaka. Kanayama died of lung cancer in September 2006. A retrospective exhibition of his artworks opened at Toyota Municipal Museum of Art in 2007.

== Zero Society ==
In 1952, Kanayama formed Zero Society with fourteen other artists, including Kazuo Shiraga and Saburo Murakami. The name of the collective, 'Zero', given by Murakami, encapsulates its members' pursuit of simple, non-artificial, and 'primary' expressions of art. Shiraga also explained that the group's name connoted neutrality and the sense of having a 'new start'.

Kanayama shared other Zero Society members' interest in simplification. During this period, he created extremely minimal paintings, which often showed only several small dark rectangles painted at the edges of completely empty canvases. While the geometric abstraction resembled Piet Mondrian's works, Kanayama's paintings pushed further the exploration of the relationship between positive and negative spaces. He highlighted the tension and interplay between the narrow dark shapes and the expansive blankness.

Kanayama's minimalistic paintings also drew inspirations from Japanese calligraphy and Zen aesthetics. The striking emptiness of the paintings not only directed viewers' attention to the spatial interplay of the white canvases and the dark shapes but also recalled Zen concepts such as 'nothingness' (mu). The asymmetric compositions and random positions of the rectangles also echoed the visual tradition of Zen-inspired ink paintings.

== Gutai ==
Around June 1955, Kanayama, Tanaka, Shiraga, and Murakami joined Gutai when the Gutai member Shōzō Shimamoto invited them on Yoshihara's behalf.

Kanayama exhibited Work B at the 1955 'Experimental Outdoor Exhibition of Modern Art to Challenge the Midsummer Sun' held by Gutai at Ashiya Park. Work B presented an unfixed small red ball placed on a 7m x 7m white wooden board. The work embodies Kanayama's continued exploration of abstract geometry. He expanded the visual language of his earlier paintings into three-dimensional space. The choice of colour evidenced the artist's awareness of the work's embeddedness in a natural environment since the saturated red helped to make the work stand out from the greenery of the park. At the same time, as the ball was constantly moved by winds and passers-by, the work animated the static modernist geometry by introducing the elements of movement, instability, and unpredictability. Kanayama also remarked that the work was not only an experiment with physical space but also an attempt to capture the mysterious balance of the celestial bodies.

For Gutai's 1956 outdoor exhibition at Ashiya Park, Kanayama created more site-specific works that further interacted with the surroundings. Footsteps (1954) was a long sheet of vinyl fabric on which the artist stamped his footprints. Over hundreds of metres long, the fabric ran across the pine grove of the park, climbed up trees, and passed through other artworks at the exhibition. The footprints both echoed visitors' actions of moving through space and recorded the temporal aspect of such movements.

Another work created by Kanayama for the outdoor exhibition, Clock, also played with the concept of time. It was a house-shaped clock on a tall pole. Despite the mundane look of the clock, its pointers were set to move anticlockwise, thus distorting visitors' perception of time and its passage.

At the 1956 outdoor exhibition, Kanayama also presented Crossing Light, a set of level-crossing signal lights used for local railways. Re-situated in the grove of Ashiya park, the lights signified the changes of natural landscapes brought by industrial developments and urbanisation in post-war Japan. The work also reflected Kanayama's interest in the rapid development of the transportation system in 1950s Japan and, particularly, in the Kansai region: the Tōkaidō express trains were running on electricity by 1956, and the promotion of Shinkansen first started in 1957.

Kanayama began using remote-control toy cars to paint in 1957. He attached felted pens or punctured cans of synthetic paint to an automatic toy car and set the car to move on canvasses laid on the floor. By doing so, Kanayama sought to remove the artist's presence completely. Reflecting upon the role of artists, these toy car paintings both invoked Surrealist automatic drawing and parodied the legacy of Pollockian Abstract Expressionism.

Kanayama frequently used balloons to explore the spatial and temporal potential of seemingly static and quotidian objects. His 1955 Balloon was a huge inflated red rubber globe hung in the middle of an exhibition room. Two inserted light bulbs illuminated the balloon from within. As the bulbs shone brightly, the balloon emanated a red glow and tinted other artworks in the space red. The work thus invasively dominated the room, interfering with viewers' sight and movement.

In 1957, Kanayama again created an installation with balloons. This time he placed a large elliptical balloon on the floor. Since the dark balloon was slightly deflated, it displayed textured wrinkles. Its slightly flattened shape also drew viewers' attention to the oft-overlooked surface of the floor in exhibition spaces.

At Gutai's first performance event, the 1957 'Gutai on Stage', Kanayama presented Giant Balloon, a performance in which he gradually inflated a huge balloon to fill the stage. He then illuminated the balloon with lights in different colour and punctured it with a knife, leaving it to leak air and shrink slowly. Although the performance showed no vigorous movements, the process of inflating and deflating the balloon underscored the process-based nature of artmaking. In addition, the changing size and shape of the balloon encouraged the audiences to reconsider the relationship between objects, bodies, and space. The brochure of 'Gutai on Stage' stated that Kanayama's performance invited viewers to think of the familiar childhood toy, balloon, from a new perspective. A year later, Kanayama again used balloons to create Biological Balloon at 'The Second Gutai on Stage'. The work showed a floating biomorphic balloon with multiple limb-like appendages. It sought to evoke the existence of unexpected creatures beyond the known and the imaginable.

== After Gutai ==
After leaving Gutai in 1965, Kanayama devoted his time to assisting Tanaka's career. However, he also continued his own artistic adventure. In the late 80s, he created a series of paintings that visualise the invisible beams of ultraviolet and infrared light. The canvases are vertically divided into blocks of radiant red, sombre violet and black. In some paintings, sharp lines in contrasting colours run through the lengths of the canvases and penetrate the colour blocks. While the glossy surface of these paintings enhances the complexity of their visual effect, Kanayama's extremely smooth and almost invisible brushwork erase traces of the artist's intervention.

Around 1992, Kanayama began incorporating music and sounds in his works. He recorded the sounds emanated from classical music in waveforms on paper. The soundwaves generate rhythmically undulating lines. Paralleling the ultraviolet and infrared works, these soundwaves again give visual forms to invisible elements. Kanayama's works explore the artistic potential of such visualisation. Later in the 90s, he revisited his early fascination with the universe and celestial balances. He used the astronomic records of asteroid trajectories, electromagnetic waves, and photos of the changing appearance of the galaxy in his artworks. For example, his Northern Galaxy Atlas (1996) is a large collage (101.5 cm x 201.5 cm) of numerous black-and-white photographs of peculiar galaxies. The photos are blurry and pixelated, forming an almost illegible mosaic-like composition.

Kanayama's most recent works, created after the turn of the century, returned to visuality and two-dimensionality. Mirroring early paintings from the Zero Society period, his latest paintings, such as Three Primary Colours (2004), focus on the flat surface of canvases and the optical effects of colours. In this painting, three vertical blocks in yellow, blue, and red are connected and penetrated by numerous horizontal lines in the same three colours. Bright primary colours and symmetric composition characterise Kanayama's latest paintings.

== Solo exhibitions ==
1992 – 'Akira Kanayama: 1st Solo Exhibition', Gallery Kuranuki, Osaka

1993 – 'Akira Kanayama: 1st Solo Exhibition', Gallery Tagaki, Nagoya

1998 – 'Akira Kanayama's Art: Zero Society and Gutai Period', Gallery HAM, Nagoya

1999 – 'Akira Kanayama's Art: 1966–1992', Gallery HAM, Nagoya

2000 – 'Akira Kanayama's Art: 1990 -1992', Gallery HAM, Nagoya

2004 – 'Akira Kanayama: Difference, Music, Immersion', Mori Yu Gallery, Kyoto

2005 – 'Akira Kanayama: New Oil on Canvas: Minimal', Gallery HAM, Nagoya

2007 – 'Akira Kanayama,' Toyota Municipal Museum of Art, Toyota
