= Osamu Suzuki (ceramist) =

- 鈴木治
- Born: April 20, 1934; Kyoto, Japan
- Died: August 8, 2001 (aged 67); Kyoto, Japan
- Known for: Ceramics, Sculpture
- Notable work: Ushi (Ox); Cloud series; Baji (Horse)
- Movement: Sodeisha
- Awards: Japan Art Academy Prize (1983); Order of the Sacred Treasure (2001)

Osamu Suzuki (鈴木 治, Suzuki Osamu) (1926-2001) was a Japanese ceramicist and one of the co-founders of the artist group Sōdeisha (eng. "Crawling through Mud Association"), a Japanese avant-garde ceramics movement that arose following the end of the Second World War and served as a counter to the traditional forms and styles in modern Japanese ceramics, such as Mingei. Working in both iron-rich stoneware and porcelain, Suzuki developed his style considerably over the course of his career, beginning with functional vessels in his early work, and spanning to fully sculptural works (which he called "clay images") in the latter half of his career. Suzuki has been described by The Japan Times as "one of Japan's most important ceramic artists of the 20th century."

== Early life and education ==
Suzuki was born on November 11, 1926, in the Gojo area of Kyoto, a historic arts area in which a number of influential ceramics artists, including Kiyomizu Rokubei, Ogata Kenzan, and Kawai Kanjirō had worked and established studios. He became familiar with ceramics from a young age, as his father, Ugenji Suzuki, was a lathe master and production potter at Eiraku Zengoro Studio.

Suzuki studied ceramics and graduated from the ceramics department of The Kyoto Second Industrial School in 1943, just avoiding conscription in the military during the Second World War.

== Career as an artist ==
=== Founding of Sodeisha ===
In 1948, Suzuki and two other young potters, Kazuo Yagi and Hikaru Yamada, founded Sodeisha, an avant-garde artist movement that sought to push back against the traditional aesthetics of Japanese ceramics, particularly relating to the mingei or folk-craft movement, which they regarded to promote rustic nostalgia and simplicity over modernist innovation. Using traditional firing and glazing techniques while simultaneously seeking to push the existing boundaries of form in contemporary ceramics, the three artists circulated inaugural postcards to publicize their manifesto, which read:

Postwar art needed the expediency of creating associations in order to escape from personal confusion; but today, finally, the provisional roles appear to have ended. The birds of dawn taking flight out of the forest of falsehood not discover the reflections in the spring of truth. We are united not to provide a 'warm bed of dreams,' but to come to terms with our existence in broad daylight.

In this way, Sodeisha, the name of which originated from a Chinese term that meant 'glazing flaw,' not only sought to disrupt cultural and historical associations that pottery had in Japanese society, but also to find beauty in the aesthetics of nature's imperfections.

During these early years, the three Sodeisha artists experimented largely with forms of Cizhou ware, a style of ceramics originating in China in the late Tang and early Ming dynasties. The potters took this traditional form and applied unconventional decor to its surface; art historian Louise Cort posits that Suzuki's 1950 vase Rondo may have been a result of seeing a photograph of an abstract Jackson Pollock painting.

=== The 1950s and 60s: Shifts in style and technique ===
It was not long, however, before the members of the fledgling Sodeisha movement were even starting to take issue with the typical vase form itself, since this template was based on the very aesthetic foundations against with the group sought to rebel.

Thus, Suzuki and his colleagues began to move away from creating traditional vessel openings in their work, experimenting with asymmetry and multiple mouths, as in the case of Suzuki's 1951 Two Headed Jar, a horn-shaped piece that featured two large openings. Additionally, in the late 1950s the potters began using rough, unglazed clay to create a more unfinished, naturalistic effect.

Not all of the changes to Suzuki's oeuvre were based on choice. In the 1960s, the world of Kyoto ceramics took a huge turn when the city government banned the use of traditional woodfiring kilns due to air pollution concerns. As a result, they began using gas and electric kilns, applying thin layers of iron oxide to their pieces before firing to create similar coloration to that produced by the Shigaraki kilns they had previously used.

In addition to the iron-rich stoneware of Sodeisha's 'muddy' aesthetic, Suzuki worked in the contrastingly polished medium of white porcelain. Since he worked in both mediums throughout his career, Suzuki was known for keeping a clean studio, deep-cleaning the space after each use to prevent cross-contamination between the two materials.

=== Deishō and Objet-yaki ===
As the work of Suzuki and his contemporaries continued to evolve, their works became less and less 'functional,' eventually moving into the realm of completely non-functional sculptural objects. These first came in the form of pieces known as objet-yaki (lit. 'kiln-fired object'). While this was a form debuted by Kazuo Yagi and the other members of Sōdeisha, including Yagi, the latter expressed that he was never particularly convinced by the term, feeling that there was a lot of confusion surrounding its meaning for both critics and the casual viewer, and that a lot of meaning became lost in its translation, resulting in a conception of Sōdeisha pottery that was more generalized than the sensibilities with which the artists sought to imbue their work. As a result, Suzuki sought to find a different term to apply to his later work.

During a 1992 solo exhibition, the artist explained that he saw a clear distinction between his works that could be 'used' and his works that could be 'seen.' He stated:

I began to call my works 'deishō' [lit. 'clay images'] because I always had a deep affinity for the context of clay, and for a time, I tried referring to it as 'deizō' or 'dogu' (prehistoric ceramic ware), but I decided to settle for the term 'deishō', because of its connotation to the universe and the cosmos. I enjoy the idea of coining this term for the purpose of describing my work, which is undefinable...not exactly a 'clay form.'

== Later life and death ==
In 1990, Suzuki became dean of the Faculty of Fine Arts at the Kyoto University of the Arts. He retired in 1992 and became an emeritus professor. In his final years, he received a number of awards recognizing his lifetime of achievement as an artist and innovator, including designation as a Person of Cultural Merit in Kyoto in 1993.

Suzuki died of esophageal cancer on April 9, 2001.

== Select list of exhibitions and holdings ==
Suzuki's work has been featured in a number of collaborative and solo exhibitions, including:

- 1970: The Biennale International Pottery Exhibition in Vallauris(winning the Golden Prize)
- 1971, 1975: International Pottery Exhibition, Faenza (won Trade Minister Prize in '71)
- 1979: Art Now '79
- 1989: Suzuki Osamu, Kyoto Prefectural Cultural Hall
- 1999: Ceramic Art of Suzuki Osamu: Poetry in Ceramic Works, National Museum of Modern Art, Tokyo (also toured Fukushima, Kyoto, Hiroshima, Kurashiki)
- 2013: Mud Elephant: The World of Suzuki Osamu, National Museum of Modern Art, Kyoto (toured Aichi, Tokyo, and Yamaguchi)

Suzuki's work can be found in museum and gallery collections around the world, including:

- The Brooklyn Museum
- The Metropolitan Museum of Art
- National Crafts Museum, Kanazawa
- The National Museum of Modern Art, Kyoto
- The Portland Art Museum
