= Yō Akiyama =

Japanese ceramic artist

Yō Akiyama (秋山 陽, Akiyama Yō, born 1953) is a Japanese ceramicist based in Kyoto. He was a late leading figure of Sōdeisha, an avant-garde ceramicist group that reimagined ceramics as nonfunctional sculptural practice. Akiyama studied directly under Kazuo Yagi, one of the founders of Sōdeisha, for six years. He later became a professor at Kyoto Municipal University of Arts and Music, where he is currently a Professor Emeritus, having retired in 2018. As an artist, he works primarily with black pottery, a technique that fires clay in low temperature, smoky conditions to create a dark effect. His predominantly largescale work is richly textural and abstract, emphasizing the earthy materiality of the work as well as its form.

Akiyama has exhibited widely in both solo and group exhibitions in Japan and abroad, with major solo exhibitions in Brussels, New York, Osaka, and Kyoto. He is a recipient of the 2010 MOA Mokichi Okada Crafts Category Grand Prize, the 2011 Mainichi Art Award, and an Award of Cultural Merit from the city of Kyoto in 2016.

== Early life ==
Akiyama was born in Shimonoseki, Yamaguchi Prefecture, in 1953. He is part of the third generation of a family of artists. He first became interested in the intuitive relationship between humans and the medium of clay in the early 1970s, while working at a school for children with intellectual disabilities. He went on to study ceramics at the Kyoto City University of the Arts, now the Kyoto Municipal University of Arts and music from 1972 to 1978, under the tutelage of Kazuo Yagi, one of the three major founders of Sōdeisha.

== Work and style ==
Akiyama makes primarily largescale works that often use several tons of clay and exceed 6 meters in length; however, he also produces smaller vessels that can be exhibited on pedestals. He specializes in 'non-functional' vessels, meaning that his ceramics do not have openings that can be used to contain liquids or other objects, in contrast to earlier utilitarian forms of pottery seen in movements such as mingei. He also specializes in black pottery, a technique that involves firing clay in relatively low-temperature, smoky conditions to create a dark hue on the surface of the work. Additionally, he uses a burner to create cracks on the surface of his pieces.

Akiyama developed and fine-tuned the latter technique in the 1980s while experimenting with the feasibility of peeling the outer skin off a ball of clay, in the same way that one might peel a fruit. To achieve this, he heated a ball of clay with a gas burner, creating a shape with a soft center and a hard, outer shell. Since that first experiment, Akiyama has refined his technique and manipulated this template to create a multitude of cracks and chasms on the surface of his pieces, in some cases completely inverting the shape.

This juxtaposition of interior and the exterior is another defining characteristic of Akiyama's work, a tension that is particularly prominent in his extensive "Metavoid" series. The works in this series range in their forms from objects that somewhat resemble objects found in nature, such as a partially-spiraling shell or a cross section of a tree trunk, to the purely abstract. In Metavoid 202, for example, Akiyama evokes the tree-trunk cross-section, with half of the piece taking the form of a familiar flat cylinder with rings. This use of clay to resemble wood already plays with textural perceptions and the viewer's expectation of the interplay between material and form, but Akiyama takes the visual experience one step further by carving out one half of the cylinder to create a smooth, 'teabowl-like' shape. Where the clay looks like it has been cut away, the surface is rough and brown—almost rust-colored—but grain-less, quickly removing any associations with wood and evoking a more metallic structure. This ambiguity of material and form is a defining characteristic of Akiyama's oeuvre, one that questions not only the function and compositions of ceramic vessels but the very function and composition of clay itself, through a nuanced exploration of an object's many external and internal layers.

Akiyama has cited clay's flexibility of form as one of the reasons that he favors it as a medium. He has said that, as an artist seeking a connection with his work and its material, his first "job" is "to create form," and the second is to "destroy it." The duality of this process requires a type of clay that will leave behind evidence of such manipulation, so Akiyama generally seeks out clay that is low in plasticity and will easily show marks, a characteristic that is not often favored by ceramicists. In an additional departure from traditional ceramics processes, Akiyama forgoes the use of a glaze to show the fired clay in its most natural form. In his view, "The more bare a clay is, the more real it is." The results are sculptures that explore the fundamental binary tensions that exist in matter including: interior and exterior, generation and decay, and continuity and division.

Flexibility of both process and results is also an important tenet of Akiyama's work. Though he draws sketches and makes mock-ups of the form he thinks a vessel might take, he also anticipates that the clay itself will play a role in dictating the final form and textures that the completed work will take. In this way, he has said that he views himself as an artist who "collaborates" with the clay, and that this creative symbiosis is a defining aspect of his oeuvre.

His work is exhibited frequently at major museums and galleries around the world and is found in a number of collections internationally, including: The Museum of Modern Ceramic Art, Gifu; The National Museum of Art, Osaka; The National Museum of Modern Art, Tokyo; The Canadian Clay and Glass Gallery, Ontario; Honolulu Museum of Art, Hawaii; Faenza International Ceramic Museum, Italy; Minneapolis Institute of Art; The Museum of Fine Arts, Boston; The Museum of Fine Arts, Houston; the Clark Art Institute and The Victoria & Albert Museum, London.

== List of solo exhibitions ==
- 1976 - Gallery Iteza, Kyoto, Japan [also in 1977]
- 1980 - Gallery 16, Kyoto, Japan
- 1986 - INAX Gallery 2, Tokyo, Japan
- 1991 - Shibuya Seibu Craft Gallery, Tokyo, Japan
- 1987 - Gallery Koyanagi, Tokyo, Japan [also in 1996]
- 1987 - Gallery Nakamura, Kyoto, Japan [also in 1996]
- 1998 - Muramatsu Gallery, Tokyo, Japan
- 1999 - Contemporary Art NIKI, Tokyo, Japan
- 2004 - INAX Tile Museum, Tokoname, Aichi, Japan
- 2005 - Gallery Kochukyo, Tokyo, Japan
- 2007 - Joan B. Mirviss Gallery, New York, USA [also in 2011, 2015]
- 2009 - Art Court Gallery, Osaka [also in 2013, 2022]
- 2010 - Galerie Pierre Marie Giraud (Brussels, Belgium) [also 2014, 2021]
- 2016 - "To the Sea of Arcay," Musée Tomo (Hiromi Kikuchi Memorial Museum of Art), Tokyo
- 2018 - "Akiyama Yo - Introduction with Soil-" Kyoto City University of Arts Gallery@KCUA (Kyoto)
- 2019 - "Echoes: In the Beginning Was Clay," QM Gallery Katara, Doha, Qatar

== See also ==
- The Japan Foundation
- Mingei
- Sōdeisha
- Kazuo Yagi
- Hikaru Yamada
