= Mizoro ware =

Type of Japanese pottery

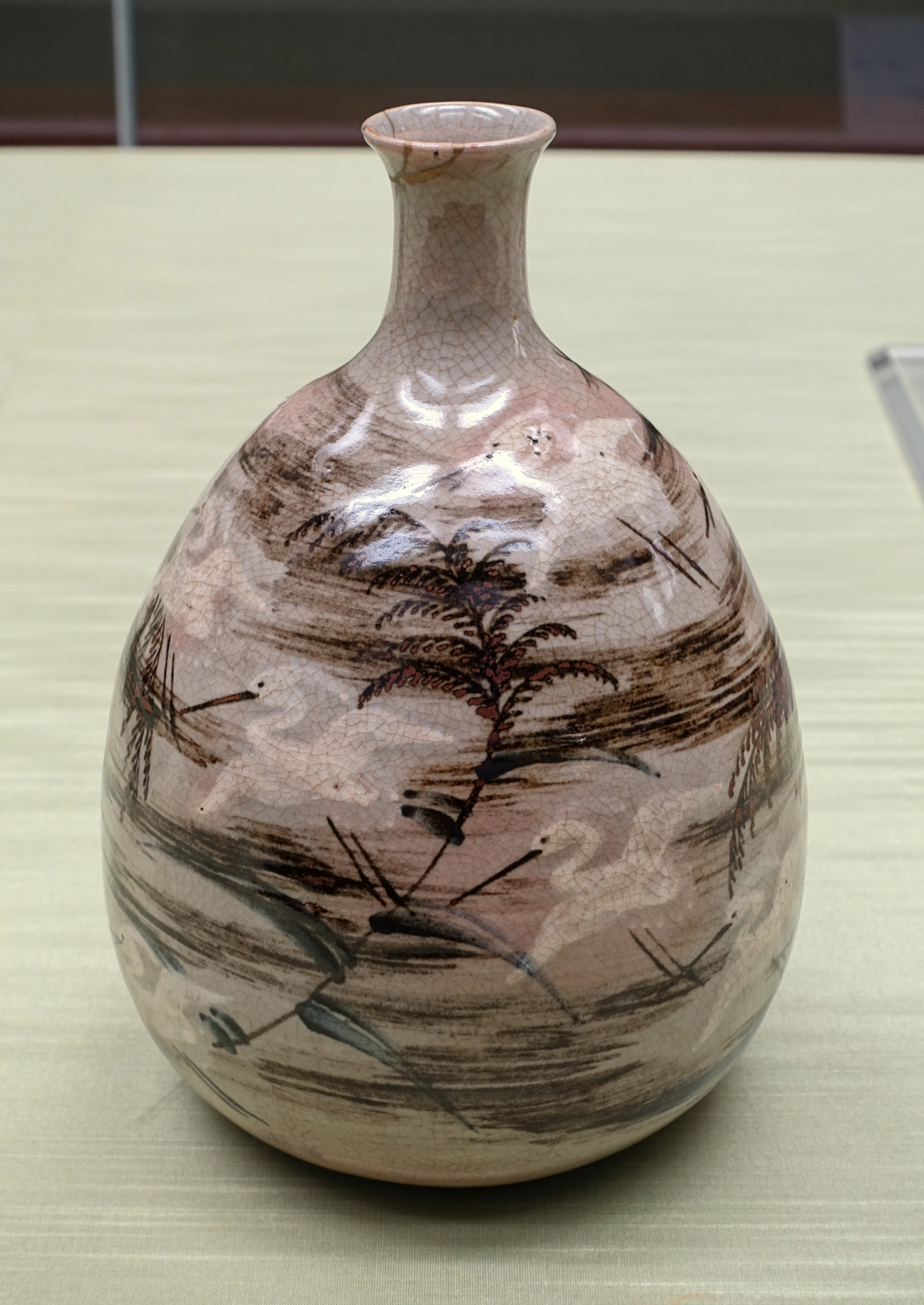
A sake bottle with herons among reeds, an example of mizoro ware

Mizoro ware (御菩薩焼, Mizoro-yaki) is a type of Japanese pottery that is a form of Kyō ware from Kyoto.

It is related to other Kyō wares such as Awata ware and Kiyomizu ware, but denotes the kiln it originates from.
