= Awata ware =

Type of Japanese pottery

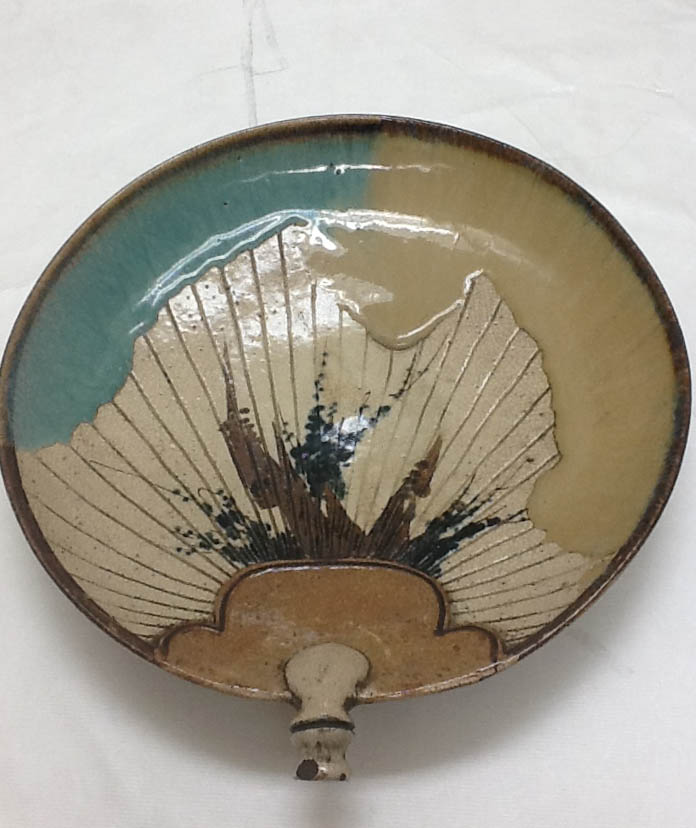
Awata ware zhun type dish, clay partly covered with drawing under a transparent, finely-crackled glaze; top covered with a thick second glaze, Edo period (19th century)

Awata ware (粟田焼, Awata-yaki) is a type of Japanese pottery that is a form of Kyō ware from Kyoto.

It is related to other Kyō wares such as Mizoro ware and Kiyomizu ware, but denotes the kiln it originates from. The origin lies in the Awataguchi area of Kyoto. Awata kilns also produced Satsuma ware at one point.

== History ==
Awata ware developed in the Awataguchi district on the eastern edge of central Kyoto, an area that became one of the earliest ceramic production zones associated with Kyō-yaki (Kyoto ware). Although pottery had long been produced in the Kyoto basin, kilns in the Awataguchi area gained prominence by the late 16th century, when potters began producing wares that would later be identified as Awata-yaki.

A significant stage in the development of ceramics in the area occurred in the early Edo period. Historical accounts of Kyoto ware describe the establishment of climbing kilns (noborigama) in the early 17th century, which enabled higher firing temperatures and more consistent production. These technological developments supported the manufacture of tea wares and other stoneware vessels, and Awataguchi emerged as one of several important kiln districts in Kyoto alongside Kiyomizu and Gojōzaka.

During the Edo period (1603–1868), demand associated with elite cultural practices—particularly the tea ceremony—contributed to the growth of Kyoto ceramics. Techniques and styles from other ceramic centers, including Seto and Karatsu, were introduced to Kyoto and adapted locally, contributing to the stylistic diversity of Awata ware. Workshops in the Awataguchi area produced vessels for both practical use and aesthetic appreciation, often reflecting the refined tastes of courtly and warrior-class patrons.

By the 18th century, Awata ware was associated with finely decorated ceramics characteristic of Kyoto production. Workshops in the district produced commissioned works for high-status clients, including members of the imperial court and regional elites, contributing to Kyoto’s reputation for elegant ceramic forms and sophisticated surface decoration.

Following the Meiji Restoration in 1868, Kyoto potters—including those in the Awata area—adapted to new economic conditions by producing wares for international markets. Export-oriented ceramics, often richly decorated, were marketed abroad under names such as “Kyoto Satsuma” (Kyō-satsuma), reflecting both stylistic influences and Western demand for Japanese decorative arts.

In the 20th century, changing domestic tastes and declining export markets affected traditional ceramic industries across Japan. Nevertheless, Awata ware continued within the broader tradition of Kyoto ceramics, with individual workshops and artists preserving and reinterpreting local techniques into the modern period.
