= Gojō =

Gojō (五条 or 五條) literally means fifth street in Japanese.

== Names ==
- Gojo Industries, an American soap company
- Gojo Takeshi, a character in manga series Kodomo no Omocha
- Satoru Gojo, a character from the anime and manga series Jujutsu Kaisen
- Gojo, a character appearing in works published by Raj Comics
- Wakana Gojo, a character from the My Dress-Up Darling anime & manga series

== Places ==
- Gojō, Nara, a city in Japan
- Gojō Street, a street in Kyoto
- Train stations:
  - Gojō Station (Kyoto)
  - Gojō Station (Nara)
