= Shikokai =

Shikokai, Shikōkai
- Years active: 1947–1956
- Location: Japan
- Major figures: Sango Uno, Yasuo Hayashi
- Influences: Picasso

Shikokai (四耕会, Shikōkai) is an avant-garde ceramic artist group formed in Kyoto in Japan in November 1947 that was active until 1956.

The founding members are Sango Uno, Uichi Shimizu, Yasuo Hayashi, and Yasuyuki Suzuki.

== Founding and philosophy ==
In 1947, Shikokai was established on November 17, the members were Sango Uno, Juro Izukura, Kinnosuke Onishi, Yasuyuki Suzuki, Saku Fujita, Shu Arai, Uichi Shimizu, Shigeru Asami, Ryozo Taniguchi, Morikazu Kimura, and Yasuo Hayashi.

Yasuo Hayashi said in his oral history study published 2019 in New York, that, "In 1947, at the age of 19, he joined the multidisciplinary avant-garde group Shikokai (Society of Four Harvests), led by the much older painter Uno Sango (1902–1988), who acted as a mentor to Hayashi and the rest of the group’s young members. Shikokai was the first strictly avant-garde group formed in postwar Kyoto."

In 1948, March 9 to 13, the 1st Shikokai Exhibition was held at Asahi Gallery in Kyoto.

In 1956, March 8 to 14, they continued their activities until the 8th Shikokai Tokyo Exhibition was held at Ohara Hall in Tokyo. The members at the final exhibition are Sango Uno, Juro Izukura, and Yasuo Hayashi. Ichizo Numata, Suroku Okamoto, Hitoshi Kato, Saku Fujita, and Tamio Hibari.

Sango Uno, who was a leader, participated in the launch of the Japan Kogei Association from abstract to traditional movement, which was a major factor in the end of this Japanese early avant-garde ceramic art group.

== See also ==
- Yagi Kazuo
- Sōdeisha
