= Osamu Suzuki =

Osamu Suzuki may refer to:

- Osamu Suzuki (businessman) (鈴木 修; 1930–2024), Japanese businessman
- Osamu Suzuki (ceramist) (鈴木 治; 1926–2001), Kyoto-based Vontemporary Japanese ceramist
- Osamu Suzuki (screenwriter) (鈴木 おさむ; born 1972), Japanese television writer and screenwriter
