= Kazuo Yagi =

Japanese potter and ceramic artist (1918–1979)

Kazuo Yagi (八木 一夫, Yagi Kazuo, 1918–1979) was a Japanese potter and ceramic artist best known for spearheading the introduction of nonfunctional ceramic vessels to the Japanese pottery world. With an innovative ceramicist as his father, Yagi was sent to art school to study sculpture, instead of pottery. After graduating in 1937, he continued to train in the progressive circles, such as the National Ceramic Research Institute and the Japan Ceramic Sculpture Association. Following a short period of military service in 1939 and through the early postwar years, he was involved in a series of collectives that sought to transcend the traditional aesthetic values in not just ceramics but also in a range of visual media.

It was not until 1948 that Yagi established his own ceramics collective, Sōdeisha, a group which rejected extant models of pottery and deliberately sought to blur the line between pottery and sculpture. Inspired in part by Isamu Noguchi's work in Japan in the early 1950s, which used ceramic materials to create modern abstract forms, Yagi and other members debuted so-called obuje-yaki ("kiln-fired objet "), or pottery with no functional purpose. The introduction of obuje-yaki was considered extremely radical at the time, because it questioned the very basis of ceramic objects. Yagi also introduced other experimental ceramic methods later in his career, such as burnishing his pottery objects black (so-called kokutō).

Through his ceramic works, Yagi questioned the boundary between pottery and sculpture. However, his steadfast dedication to ceramics ultimately resulted in the nonfunctional ceramic vessel becoming an accepted type within Japanese pottery practice today. His legacy was felt through Sōdeisha, which continued even after his death, and his teaching at Kyoto City University of Arts.

== Biography ==
=== Early life (1918–1937) ===
Yagi was born in Kyoto on July 4, 1918. He was the first son of the potter Issō Yagi, whose workshop was in the Gojōzaka neighborhood of Kyoto, the traditional center for kyōyaki (Kyoto ceramic wares). Issō was an early reformer of pottery, asserting the potential of ceramics to be a form of art. Perhaps for this reason, Yagi was sent to take classes in sculpture. In 1937 he graduated from the sculpture program at Kyoto Shiritsu Bijutsu Kōgei Gakkō (Kyoto City School of Art and Craft, today Kyoto Shiritsu Geijutsu Daigaku or Kyoto City University of the Arts).

=== Early career (1937–1946) ===
After graduating from university, Yagi became a trainee at the Kokuritsu Tōjiki Jikenjō (National Ceramic Research Institute), which had been run by the Ministry of Agriculture and Commerce since 1920. He joined the Nihon Tōchō Kyōkai (Japan Ceramic Sculpture Association) at the invitation of its founder, the ceramic sculptor Ichiga Numata. Numata was trained at the French porcelain manufactory in Sèvres and spent time in Auguste Rodin's studio, learning the art of ceramic sculpture. Numata created sculptures of animals in coarse red clay, which inspired Yagi to try creating similar works. Yagi also worked at Numata's studio.

In 1939, he was conscripted into the army and sent to China for military service, but was released the following year due to illness. Upon his return, he joined the avant-garde nihonga exhibition society Rekitei Bijutsu Kyōkai (Progress Art Association). Working against traditional aesthetics, the group explored avant-garde European trends in painting by Wassily Kandinsky, Surrealist artists, and the Bauhaus. In addition to paintings, the society showed works of ceramics, photography, ikebana, and embroidery in its exhibitions. Through this exhibition society Yagi became familiar with European avant-garde artworks. However, after the society disbanded due to World War II, Yagi temporarily stopped working in ceramics and became a teacher for the duration of the war.

=== Early postwar (1946–1950) ===
With the end of World War II, Yagi left his teaching job and devoted himself again to ceramics. His works were exhibited at the second and third Nihon Bijutsu Tenrankai ("Nitten", the government-sponsored salon exhibition). He also exhibited works at the annual Kyoto Municipal Exhibition ("Kyōten"), winning an award for his work Kinkanshoku ("Annual Eclipse"), and at exhibitions of the Pan-Real Art Association. He participated in the establishment of the Seinen Sakutōka Shudan (Young Pottery-makers' Collective) in 1946, a group that sought to establish new expressions in pottery appropriate to postwar society. The collective organized three group exhibitions before disbanding in 1948. Yagi was also involved in avant-garde art activities outside of pottery and ceramics – for example, he was a founding member of the Gendai Bijutsu Kondankai (Contemporary Art Discussion Group) in 1952.

=== Founding of Sōdeisha (1948) ===
In 1948, Yagi and his colleagues Osamu Suzuki, Hikaru Yamada, Yoshisuke Matsui, and Tetsuo Kano from the Seinen Sakutōka Shudan established the Sōdeisha ("Crawling through Mud Association"), an avant-garde ceramic arts group. Their manifesto drew from Surrealist language to declare its radical goals for ceramics, proclaiming: "We are united not to provide a 'warm bed of dreams', but to come to terms with our existence in broad daylight." As a group, they vowed to stop referencing older models of pottery, and to stop submitting their works to the NItten and other salon exhibitions. Rather, they launched their own independent annual group exhibitions. Unlike juried salons, Sōdeisha exhibitions did not distinguish between fine art and pottery, blurring the boundary as reflected in their works. Sōdeisha continued to be active past Yagi's death in 1979, and eventually disbanded in 1998.

=== Groundbreaking experiments and international recognition (1950s) ===
In 1950, Yagi received early international acclaim when several of his works were included in an exhibition at The Museum of Modern Art in New York, Japanese Household Objects. The works were purchased by Antonin Raymond and Noémi Raymond at the request of Philip Johnson, then the Architecture & Design curator at MoMA.

Yagi and Sōdeisha members continued to experiment with new expressions in pottery. Yagi drew significant inspiration from the work of Isamu Noguchi, who visited Japan in 1950 and 1952 and produced a number of ceramic works inspired by prehistoric Japanese pottery from the Yayoi and Kofun periods with abstract sculpture. His ability to create sculpture with clay as a synthesis of Japanese and Western aesthetics encouraged Yagi's own aspirations to push ceramics in new directions. However, unlike Noguchi who was merely using clay as a medium, Yagi did not aspire to completely destroy the ceramic tradition in Japan – rather, he intended to push that heritage to its limits with new types of pottery.

In 1954, Yagi famously debuted his first work of non-functional pottery, Zamuza-shi no sanpō (Mr. Samsa's Walk). By rejecting the functionality of the ceramic vessel, Yagi's work effectively opened up a new genre in the Japanese pottery world: the so-called obuje-yaki ("kiln-fired objet "). Following the debut of this work, Yagi and Sōdeisha members began to gradually reject more and more components of traditional pottery, such as the use of the pottery wheel and the use of glaze. Sōdeisha members began to experiment with completely unglazed ceramic works.

By the late 1950s, Sōdeisha members had begun to work in distinctly individual styles, rather than working in similar materials and methods. For example, in 1957, Yagi began working with kokutō ("black pottery"). These works were included in the exhibition The New Japanese Painting and Sculpture, which was organized by The Museum of Modern Art in New York and opened at the San Francisco Museum of Art before traveling to other locations.

=== Later career (1960–1979) ===
In 1962, Yagi and his Sōdeisha colleague Yamada founded Mon Kōbō (Corner Workshop), an industrial design business where they designed functional ceramic objects intended for mass production. The designs were painted with clock gears dipped in black pigment painted over white slip, recalling Chinese Cizhou ware. These designs are evidence of the artists' ongoing interest in ceramics as functional objects.

Yagi became a professor at Kyoto City University of the Arts in 1971. The same year, he and the graphic designer Ikkō Tanaka designed the medals for the 1972 Winter Olympics in Sapporo. Yagi designed the front of the medal, which was meant to evoke the snow and ice of Japan, and Tanaka designed the back.

== Works ==
=== Early postwar experiments ===
In the late 1940s and early 1950s, Sōdeisha members, including Yagi, primarily experimented with ways in which to modernize the use of slip and pigments. Yagi remarked that he was ultimately trying to find a way to harmonize the aesthetics of modern painting with the shibui ("subdued, sober, understated") aesthetics of Japanese pottery. By the late 1940s, Yagi was already deeply influenced by images of Pablo Picasso's ceramics, particularly by the works' capacity to act both as a vessel and as a medium for representation. Yagi carved an image of a face onto a jar from this period (Jar with Inlaid Figure, 1949). Although the image recalls Picasso, the use of dark pigment on white slip was reminiscent of earlier Chinese Cizhou wares and Korean buncheong wares. Yagi's works selected for the 1951 MoMA exhibition were described as "influenced by Klee, Miro and Picasso. While his technique is traditional, his shapes present a fresh departure in Japanese art and are his own invention."

=== Obuje-yaki ("kiln-fired objet ") ===
Yagi and Sōdeisha members were at the forefront of a major change in the Japanese pottery world: the shift from ceramics as objects used in everyday life, to objects displayed at exhibitions and rarely handled. Although ceramics were originally excluded from the Nitten exhibition, by Yagi's lifetime they were included and these works were gradually losing any daily functionality. Sōdeisha's independent exhibitions further interrogated boundaries between art and pottery.

Obuje-yaki ("kiln-fired objet ") describes the most radical challenge to the separation of pottery from sculpture, in that the works are created with clay and fired in a kiln, but have no function and are appreciated primarily for their visual form. Yagi's Zamuza-shi no sanpō (Mr. Samsa's Walk) of 1954 is largely regarded as the first and most famous example of obuje-yaki. It debuted at the 1954 Sodeisha exhibition, and was shown again at Yagi's first solo exhibition at the Forumu Garō (Formes Gallery) in Tokyo in December 1954. The title of the work refers to Gregor Samsa, the man who turns into a cockroach in The Metamorphosis by Franz Kafka. The work is made up of a large ring of clay that stands vertically on a number of small, pipe-like legs that recall the eponymous cockroach. Because of its vertical orientation, there was no clear function or use for the object. And although Yagi made use of the pottery wheel to create the primary ring of clay and the pipes, he consciously rejected the traditional function of the pottery wheel to raise clay up into the form of a vessel.

Despite introducing such a radical work to the Japanese pottery world, certain aspects of Zamuza-shi no sanpō demonstrate Yagi's ongoing commitment to preserving key aspects Japanese pottery and pottery history. Yagi's obuje-yaki never strayed from kiln-fired clay, and often referenced prehistoric earthenware or Chinese glazing techniques. The glaze on Zamuza-shi no sanpō is jōkon-yū, a wood-ash-based glaze that is fairly translucent but congeals into brown beads and rivers across the surface of the object. In Kyoto pottery circles, this was considered a low-grade, coarse, and cheap type of glaze. Yagi's effort to use traditional ceramic materials in new ways may also be seen as part of a larger effort to re-examine the role and form of Japanese traditional arts in the early postwar period.

Although Zamuza-shi no sanpō is one of the most famous examples of obuje-yaki, it was part of a larger trend in Japanese pottery. Following the war, there was a major effort within the Japanese pottery world to push the practice from the realm of craft to the realm of art. Yagi's work with obuje-yaki can be seen as part of a reaction again mingei (folk art) ceramics and the craft movement, which was inextricably linked to the nationalist ideologies driving Japanese militarism of the 1930s and 1940s. By aligning ceramics with the arts in the postwar period, Yagi and others were able to push the boundaries of what constituted "pottery". This push was equally driven by exposures to new developments in European and American art during the U.S. Occupation, which drew attention to the old-fashioned styles in pottery and the potential for innovation.

==== Kokutō ("black pottery") ====
Yagi began working in kokutō ("black pottery") in 1957. Kokutō works were made of smoothly burnished clay, fired at low temperatures that were heavily reduced toward the end of the firing process using smoke from burning pine needles. As a result, the surface became coated in carbon. The final objects were smooth, even, and black and had few historical precedents. Most of these objects were hand-built and asymmetrical, occasionally recalling prehistoric ceramics from the Kofun period. Because these works were a form of earthenware, they were extremely fragile and could not be functional at all. Like Zamuza-shi no sanpō, they are obuje-yaki.

== Legacy and influence ==
Yagi's teaching position at Kyoto City University of the Arts helped him pass on his knowledge and innovative approach to ceramics to many protégés. Sōdeisha also remained active with up to forty members, and its exhibitions became important annual exhibitions for potters. In Japanese pottery history, Zamuza-shi no sanpō has been canonized as one of the most important developments of the postwar period. Due in part to Yagi's breakthrough obuje-yaki, the category of Zen'ei Tōki ("Avant-garde ceramics"), which encompasses obuje-yaki, is an official category at the biennial Nihon Tōgei Ten ("Japan Ceramic Art Exhibition"), established in 1971.

== Selected solo and group exhibitions ==
- First Sōdeisha Exhibition, Osaka Takashimaya, 1948
- Fourth Annual Kyoto Municipal Exhibition, 1948 – winner of Mayor's prize
- Modern Japanese Ceramic Exhibition, Musée Cernuschi, 1950
- Second Sōdeisha Exhibition, Kyoto City Museum, 1950
- Japanese Household Objects, The Museum of Modern Art, 1951
- Yagi Kazuo Solo Exhibition, Formes Gallery, 1954
- 2nd International Ceramics exhibition, Ostend, 1959 – winner of grand prix
- 3rd International Ceramic Exhibition, Prague, 1962 – winner of grand prix
- Tōji no shinsedai, Gotoh Museum, 1964
- The New Japanese Painting and Sculpture, The Museum of Modern Art, 1966-1967
- 40th Sōdeisha Exhibition (30th Anniversary of Establishment of Sōdeisha), 1977
- Yagi Kazuo Ceramics Exhibition, Grand Palais, 1978
- Yagi Kazuo, Kyoto National Museum of Modern Art, Tokyo National Museum of Modern Art, 1981
- Hatsudōsuru Gendai no Kōgei 1945-1970, Kyoto City Museum, 1988
- Sengo Nihon no Zen'ei Bijutsu, Yokohama Museum of Art, 1994
- Crafts in everyday life in the 1950s and 1960s, National Museum of Modern Art Tokyo, 1995
- Kyoto no kōgei 1910-1940, National Museum of Modern Art Kyoto, 1998
- Sōgetsu to sono jidai 1945-1970, Ashiya City Museum, Chiba City Museum, 1999
- Kyoto no kōgei 1945-2000, National Museum of Modern Art Kyoto, 2001
- Yagi Kazuo – A Retrospective, Freer Gallery of Art, National Museum of Modern Art Kyoto, Tokyo Metropolitan Teien Art Museum, 2004
- Birds of Dawn: Pioneers of Japan's Sodeisha Ceramic Movement, Joan B Mirviss Ltd, 2011

== Sources ==
- Winther-Tamaki, Bert. "Yagi Kazuo: The Admission of the Nonfunctional Object into the Japanese Pottery World". Journal of Design History Vol. 12 No. 2 (1999): 123-141.
- Cort, Louise Allison. "Japanese Encounters with Clay." In Isamu Noguchi and Modern Japanese Ceramics: A Close Embrace of the Earth, 103-191. Edited by Louise Allison Cort and Bert Winther-Tamaki. Washington, D.C. : Arthur M. Sackler Gallery, Smithsonian Institution : Berkeley : University of California Press, 2003.
- Cort, Louise Allison. "Veiled References: the role of glaze in Japanese avant-garde ceramics." In Ceramics and Modernity in Japan, 169-188. Edited by Meghen Jones and Louise Allison Cort. New York: Routledge, 2020.
- 編集京都国立近代美術館『京都の工芸 1910-1940』京都国立近代美術館、1998.
- 編集京都国立近代美術館『京都の工芸, 1945-2000』京都国立近代美術館、2001.
