= Hikaru Yamada =

Japanese ceramicist (1923–2001)

- Born: December 23, 1923; Asagaya, Tokoyo, Japan
- Died: November 29, 2001 (aged 77)
- Known for: Ceramic art

Hikaru Yamada (Japanese: 山田光）(1923–2001) was a Japanese ceramicist, known for co-founding the Young Potter-maker's Collective in Kyoto and the avant-garde ceramic group Sōdeisha (Crawling through Mud Association). During the course of his career, Yamada's oeuvre evolved considerably, beginning with more functional ceramic vessels and moving on to experiment with non-functional or anti-functional works. By the latter half of the 20th century, however, his style had become far more abstract, with a focus on flat ceramic sculptures.

== Early life and education ==
The son of a Buddhist priest, Yamada was born on December 23, 1923, in Asagaya in Tokyo. To avoid the aftermaths of the Great Kanto Earthquaqke, the family moved to Gifu City, a ceramic center in Japan. He graduated from the Department of Ceramics at Kyoto Higher Polytechnic School (now the Kyoto Institute of Technology) in 1945.

== Kyoto and Sōdeisha ==
While in Kyoto, Yamada met fellow ceramicist Kazuo Yagi through Yagi's father Issō, a renowned ceramicist. In 1946, Yamada and the young Yagi founded the Young Potters' Collective (青年作陶家集団), while still making more functional vessels and continuing to actively enter his work at the national and local salons, namely Nitten and Kyoten respectively. Two years later, in July 1948, Yamada and Yagi, along with ceramicists Osamu Suzuki, Tetsu Kano, and Yoshisuke Matsui formed the avant-garde ceramic group Sōdeisha (translated as "The Crawling through Mud Association). Sōdeisha sought to move beyond the formal limitations of functional ceramic vessels, experimenting with creating a symbiotic fusion of materiality and form, as well as abstraction and creative adaptation of "traditional" ceramic forms.

Yamada's work, too, changed during his affiliation with Sōdeisha. By the 1950s, he shifted away from functional vessels, and instead featured narrow, nonfunctional openings. As the years went on, these openings closed altogether, as he began to favor diverse use of shapes and glazes over functionality. His works, together with those by his peers of Sōdeisha, became known internationally and were shown in such international exhibitions as the 1962 Prague International Ceramics Exhibition and the 1972 Faenza International Ceramics Exhibition. In 1961, he received the Japan Ceramic Society Award (日本陶磁協会賞受).

Many of his works produced in the latter half of the twentieth century featured flat, rectangular pieces that acted as frames of sorts, featuring round or smaller rectangular perforations that created a viewing experience he referred to as a 'borrowed landscape.' These perforations, often containing smaller moveable pieces, or, in some cases, small balls of clay, allowed viewers to see through his work and perceive the space beyond through a new lens. They create a juxtaposition between the three-dimensional landscape and this two-dimensional deconstruction of the organic and inorganic materials that comprise landscape scenes.

== Later years ==
In 1979, Yamada became a professor at Osaka University of Arts. During this time, his artistic style changed as he began experimenting with different materials, including black ceramic and palladium silver. This shift in materials was in part a response to the death that year of Yagi, with whom Yamada had remained close throughout the course of their careers. Black pottery was Yagi's signature technique, created by burnishing and firing clay continuously at low temperature in a smoky environment. Yamada had refrained from using it while his friend was alive and began using it himself as an act of homage. The sleek, uniform aesthetic afforded by black pottery allowed Yamada to further deconstruct the concept of the ceramic "vessel" and experiment with the two-dimensionality of various forms, as seen in his 1981 piece, Circle Screen, Black Clay, Kokuto. This work consists of a square piece propped up on a simple plinth of the same material, with a circle cut out of the middle of the square. The form adds further dimensions to the "borrowed landscape" for the viewer, since the bissected and moveable center circular piece creates different perspectives depending on its positioning and the angle at which the viewer peers through the work.

Yamada received the Kyoto City Cultural Merit Award in 1995 and was awarded the Kyoto Art and Culture Prize at an exhibition in 2000. He was also named as an Honorary Member of the Japan Craft Design Association (日本クラフトデザイン協会名誉会). Yamada died of pneumonia on November 29, 2001, in Kyoto at age 77.

== Legacy ==
Yamada's works are held in museum and gallery collections around the world, including the Mori Art Museum, The Newcastle Art Gallery in Australia, and the Meguro Museum of Art.

Sōdeisha has had an enduring legacy both within Japan and on an international scale, with many contemporary ceramicists fusing techniques and forms inspired by the group in their own work, such as hand-building and experimentation with two-dimensionality. In 2017, the National Museum of Ireland held a large exhibition, titled Shadows of Sōdeisha, in celebration of the 60th anniversary of relations between Japan and Ireland. This exhibition featured contemporary works by both Japanese and Irish artists, positioning Yamada as one of the forerunners of the movement and demonstrating the transnational scope of Yamada's and his contemporaries' impact on the international pottery scene.
