= Visage Painting and the Human Face in 20th Century Art =

Visage Painting and the Human Face in 20th Century Art was a major international overview of painting and the face held in 2000 at the National Museum of Western Art in Tokyo and at the National Museum of Modern Art, Kyoto, curated by National Museum of Modern Art, Tokyo.

It included works by:

- Magdalena Abakanowicz
- Ai-mitsu
- Shigeru Aoki
- Jean Arp
- Antonin Artaud
- Francis Bacon
- Georg Baselitz
- Francesco Clemente
- Chuck Close
- Jean Dubuffet
- Max Ernst
- Fang Lijun
- Lucio Fontana
- Tsuguharu Foujita
- Alberto Giacometti
- Toshiyuki Hasegawa
- Tatsuo Ikeda
- Leiko Ikemura
- Alexei von Jawlenski
- Hitoshi Karasawa
- On Kawara
- Myoung Sook Kim
- Tamiji Kitagawa
- Paul Klee
- Oskar Kokoschka
- Willem de Kooning
- Yasuo Kuniyoshi
- Shigeru Kuriyama
- Henri Matisse
- Shunsuke Matsumoto
- Henri Michaux
- Tomio Miki
- Joan Miró
- Amedeo Modigliani
- Kaita Murayama
- Tsune Nakamura
- Pablo Picasso
- Jackson Pollock
- Chatchai Puipia
- Gerhard Richter
- Aso Saburo
- Shoji Sekine
- Georgy Shishkin
- Yan Pei Ming
- Tetsugoro Yoruzu
- Zhang Xiaogang

== Subjects ==
This exhibition presented works by 45 artists from the dawn of the 20th century to the present.
