= Kiyomizu Rokubei =

Head of the Kyoto-based Kiyomizu family of ceramists

Kiyomizu Rokubei (清水六兵衛) is the name bestowed on the head of the Kyoto-based Kiyomizu family of ceramists. With over 240 years of history, the studio is now into its eighth generation. It is currently headed by contemporary ceramist and sculptor Rokubei VIII. The family was influential in the development and survival of Kyō ware.

== Kiyomizu family heads ==
Professional name	Life dates	Year of headship	Other names
Kotō Rokubei	c. 1735–1799	1771	Birth name: Kotō Kuritarō (古藤栗太郎), Gō: Gusai (愚斎)
Kotō Rokubei II	1790–1860	1811	Birth name: Shōjirō (正次郎), Gō: Seisai (静斎), Retirement name: Rokuichi (六一)
Kotō Rokubei III/ Shimizu Rokubei III	1820–1883	1838	Gō: Shōun:(祥雲)
Shimizu Rokubei IV	1848–1920	1883	Birth name: Shōjirō (正次郎) Gō: Shōrin (祥麟), Retirement name: Rokui(六居)
Shimizu Rokubei V/ Kiyomizu Rokubei V	1875–1959	1913	Birth name: Kuritarō (栗太郎), Gō: Shōrei (祥嶺), Retirement name: Rokuwa (六和)
Kiyomizu Rokubei VI	1901–1980	1945	Birth name: Shōtarō (章太郎), Gō: Rokusei (禄晴)
Kiyomizu Rokubei VII	1922–2006	1981	Birth name: Shō (洋), Gō: Hiroshi (裕詞), Sculptor name: Kiyomizu Kyūbei (清水九兵衛)
Kiyomizu Rokubei VIII	b. 1954	2000	Birth name: Masahiro (柾博)

== Kiyomizu Rokubei I ==
Born Kotō Kuritarō in Settsu, Osaka around 1735, Rokubei was the son of a farmer named Kotō Rokuzaemon (古藤六左衛門). Sometime between 1748 and 1751, he moved to Kyoto and began to study pottery under Ebiya Seibei (海老屋清兵衛), acknowledged as the "first recorded potter of Kyomizu [sic] faience". In 1771, he opened his own studio in the Gojōzaka district of Kyoto, near Kiyomizu Temple, and took the name Rokubei. The three characters making up this name are a combination of those in his father's and teacher's names.

According to some accounts, the name Rokubei was given to him by the abbot-prince of Myōhō Temple (妙法院), who was very favourably impressed with a set of black Raku ware cups the potter made him. It is known that the abbot-prince gave him a seal to use as his mark: the character 清 (pronounced sei or kyo) bounded by a hexagon. The seal's character was written by a priest from Tenryū-ji Temple, and is the first character in Kiyomizu. This mark, the rokumoku seal (六目印), has continued to be used through the Kiyomizu generations, although the second family head added a double line to the hexagon to distinguish the works of the first Rokubei.

Rokubei was active in Kyoto art circles and counted among his friends the painters Maruyama Ōkyo, Matsumura Goshun, and Tanomura Chikuden. He was known to have enlisted these friends from the Shijō school of painting to decorate his pieces. He specialized in finely decorated faience, and remains particularly admired for his three-colour overglaze (iro-e) technique.

== Kiyomizu Rokubei II ==
Born in 1790 in Kyoto, he was the son of Rokubei I. He studied under his father until the latter's death in 1799. At just nine years of age, he was too young to take over the family kiln. He continued his studies until 1811, when he became atelier head as Rokubei II. As such, he continued the traditions begun by his father, particularly the development of coloured, semi-transparent glazes. He produced pieces inspired by various types of pottery, including Seto ware and Shigaraki ware. In later life, he worked in blue and white porcelain, although it has been suggested this was not his strength.

In 1838, Rokubei II retired to be succeeded by his second son, Kuritarou. Rokubei II took the name Rokuichi (六一). In 1840 he was asked by the daimyō of Nagaoka in Echigo (present-day Niigata) to open a kiln. He did in 1843, creating the Oyama-yaki pottery. He died in 1860.

== Kiyomizu Rokubei III ==
Born in Kyoto in 1820, Kuritarō was the second son of Rokubei II. He became head of the family business and assumed the name Rokubei III at 18 when his father retired in 1838. In 1868, he again changed his name, substituting the surname Kotō with Shimizu, an alternate reading for the characters making up Kiyomizu (清水). He used the same potter's mark as Rokubei I, however, substituted the latter’s square characters with cursive ones.

Rokubei III was responsible during this tumultuous time for maintaining the Kiyomizu kiln and for ensuring its resurgence while respecting family tradition. He also joined in efforts to revive Kyoto industry following the transfer of the capital to Tokyo in 1868. While preserving the techniques of his forebears, Rokubei III was also open to new, foreign influences. He was greatly affected by Modernism, and produced western items such as coffee cups. In 1879, he was one of the ceramists commissioned to make a tea service for use during the visit of former US president Ulysses S. Grant.

By the late 1860s, Kiyomizu Rokubei III, like other heads of the long-established Kyoto potteries, realized the advantages of modernization and of attempting to accommodate Western tastes. In 1868, together with potter Miyagawa Kōzan, he visited Yokohama to learn about western manufacturing and painting techniques. This shift in orientation was encouraged by government authorities, who awarded prizes to ceramists— including Rokubei III— for excellence in western-style works. The Kiyomizu kiln, however, remained fairly conservative in its output, sticking predominantly to traditional pieces and styles.

Rokubei III traveled to Hikone to study Seto-yaki. He was admired for his skill with blue and white porcelain, celadon and red-glaze ceramics. He was also concerned with decoration, and studied with Nanga painter Oda Kaisen (小田海僊). His style has been described as "bold", "unique" and "daring". He frequently served on juries and won medals at domestic exhibitions, including the Kyoto Exhibition (1875), the Domestic Industrial Exhibition (1877), and the Nagoya Exhibition (1878). His works also featured in exhibitions in Paris, Sydney and Amsterdam.

== Kiyomizu Rokubei IV ==
Rokubei IV was born in 1848, the oldest son of Rokubei III. He took over the headship in 1883 upon his father's death. He was known for his subtle, intellectual works, which contrasted with his father's dramatic style. Most of his pieces were Raku-yaki, Seto-yaki, Shigaraki-yaki, and other traditional ceramic styles. He was especially skilled at crab decorations, a trend of the period. He studied painting with Shiokawa Bunrin, a Shijō school painter who was strongly influenced by Western art.

Rokubei IV was active in Kyoto art circles, helping to establish the Gojōzaka Ceramics Union, the Yutōen (遊陶園) ceramics organization, the Society for Ceramics Appreciation (京都陶磁器品評会), and the Kami Kai (佳美会) with painter/ designer Kamisaka Sekka (神坂雪佳). In 1895 he co-founded the Kyoto Ceramic Research Institute. He participated in initiatives to popularize Japanese arts abroad. During the 1880s, he participated in art exhibitions as a competitor and judge.

He retired in 1913 in favour of his son, and took the name Rokui. He died in 1920, leaving a legacy of having synthesized the techniques of the Kiyomizu family and truly defined the Rokubei style. A porcelain tōrō lantern made by Rokubei IV donated by Rokubei V in 1938 stands on the grounds of the Tokyo National Museum garden.

== Kiyomizu Rokubei V ==
As an adolescent, Rokubei V studied painting under Shijō master Kōno Bairei (幸野楳嶺), and at the Kyoto Municipal School of Painting (京都府画学校). After graduating, he apprenticed with his father, Rokubei IV. Following Bairei's death in 1895, he also studied with Takeuchi Seihō (竹内栖鳳). In 1895, he exhibited his first ceramic piece at the National Industrial Exposition (内国勧業博覧会). Stylistically, Rokubei V was open to various influences. He took inspiration from Chinese porcelain, the Rinpa school of painting, Art Nouveau and Maiolica. He was particularly skilled at celadon and traditional overglazed enamel.

Due to his father's ill health, Rokubei V was a leading figure at the family kiln from 1902, although he did not officially take over until 1913. In 1928 he changed the family surname to Kiyomizu and applied it retroactively to previous generations. In 1945 he retired and took the name Rokuwa (六和). He continued, nonetheless, to produce ceramics throughout the 1950s.

Throughout his career, Rokubei V was highly active in art associations. He was a co-founder of the Yutōen (遊陶園) study group, the Ceramics Studies Association (陶芸研究団体), the Kyoto Ceramics Research Facility (京都市陶磁器試験場), the Japan Crafts Association (日本工芸会), and the Gojō kai (五条会). He was also awarded numerous prizes from the mid-1910s on, including at the National Fine Art Exhibition (全国美術展) and the annual Nōshōmushō Exhibition (農商務省展). In 1930 he was made a member of the Imperial Art Academy (帝国美術院会), and in 1931, he received a medal from the French president. Rokubei V died in 1959. In 2001, he was voted 21st Most Important and Most Popular Japanese Ceramist in the Last 100 Years by Japanese art magazine Honoho Geijutsu.

== Kiyomizu Rokubei VI ==
Rokubei VI, the eldest son of Rokubei V, graduated from the Kyoto City School of Art and Craft (京都市立美術工芸学校) and Kyoto Municipal College of Painting (京都市立絵画専門学校) before apprenticing with his father from 1925. That same year, he entered his first competition. His career was to be marked by success in exhibitions including numerous awards at the Bunten (文展), Teiten (帝展) and Nitten (日展). He was later frequently selected as a judge and director of these national exhibitions. He enjoyed international acclaim, showing pieces at exhibitions, having his works join museum collections and winning awards in Belgium, the USSR, France and Italy. He was made a member of the Japan Art Academy (日本芸術院会) in 1962 and awarded the Order of Cultural Merit (文化功労) in 1976.

Both before and after he became Rokubei VI in 1945, he participated in efforts to promote young artists by founding a variety of organizations. He was one of "the first wave of 'individualist' potters in contemporary Japanese history", known for his unique pieces and innovations. He created new glazes in 1953 and 1971, and invented a new firing technique in 1955. He was skilled at various Japanese and non-Japanese styles of pottery and praised for his versatility.

In 1980, Rokubei VI collapsed while visiting an exhibition celebrating the Kiyomizu family's history. He died soon after.

== Kiyomizu Rokubei VII ==
In addition to critically acclaimed works of art, Rokubei VII’s career was marked by changes of name and of specialty. Born the third son of Tsukamoto Takejirō (塚本竹十郎) in Aichi Prefecture, he was adopted into the Kiyomizu family when he married Rokubei VI’s eldest daughter in 1951. At that time, he took the name Kiyomizu Yōji (清水洋士), which he shortened to Yō (洋) the next year.

In 1953, he graduated from Tokyo University of the Arts (東京芸術大学), where he studied metal casting. He worked at the Kiyomizu kiln throughout the '50s, and won his first ceramics award at the 1957 Nitten exhibition. In 1963 he became an assistant professor of ceramics at the Kyoto City University of Arts. Two years later he again showed at the Nitten, this time as Kiyomizu Yōshi (清水裕詞).

From the second half of the 1960s, Rokubei VII began following his true passion: sculpture. He exhibited his first sculpture in 1966 under the name Kiyomizu Gotōe (清水五東衛). In 1967, he made the radical decision to specialize exclusively in sculpture as Kiyomizu Kyūbei. Although he inherited the headship of the family kiln in 1981, he did not return to pottery-making until 1987, meaning a 20-year gap in works by a Kiyomizu Rokubei.

As Kyūbei, he produced contemporary pieces in clay and metal. As Rokubei VII, he not only made abstract works, but also traditional, functional objects such as vases, tea bowls, sake sets, coffee cups and plates. Although he was prolific, according to his heir, Rokubei VIII, "When he began working as Kyūbei, he destroyed his earlier pieces. As a result, very few works from that period remain."

In 2000, he handed over the Rokubei title to his eldest son, though he continued to produce sculpture as Kiyomizu Kyūbei until his death in 2006.

== Kiyomizu Rokubei VIII ==
Born in 1954, Kiyomizu Masahiro is the eldest son of Rokubei VII. In the mid-1970s and early 1980s, he studied architecture, sculpture and ceramics in Tokyo and Kyoto before joining the family pottery in 1983. From that time through the present, he has received various national and international prizes, including the Asahi Ceramics Exhibition (朝日陶芸展), Kyoto Prefectural Culture Award (京都府文化賞), Sidney Myer Fund International Ceramic Award (シドニー・マイヤー基金国際陶芸賞展), and Ceramic Society of Japan Prize (日本陶磁協会賞). In 2004, he was ranked 12th by art professionals in a survey of Japan's most important living ceramists.

In 2000, he succeeded his father as head of the Kiyomizu pottery, a position he continues to hold. In addition, he is presently an instructor of contemporary ceramics at the Kyoto University of Art and Design (京都造形芸術大学).

== Kiyomizu family branches ==
Rather than inheriting the family headship, Rokubei II's eldest son, Takejirō, was the progenitor in 1839 of a new family branch as Kiyomizu Shichibei (清水七兵衛). The reason is unclear, but apocryphally relates to the fact that he was a heavy drinker and not permitted by his father to use the Rokubei name. Lifestyle aside, Shichibei apparently inherited the family style and technique, with his works reputedly being easily mistakable for those of his father. He was succeeded by his eldest son, also Takejirō (竹次郎), who took the title Kiyomizu Shichibei II. The Shichibei potters used a mark based on that of the Rokubeis: the character sei (清) surrounded by a double heptagon.

The second son of Shichibei II, Kōzaburō, went on to head a new branch of the extended family: the Tsuchitani (土谷) kiln. This family is headed by Tsuchitani Zuikō (土谷瑞光) III (b. 1928). His two sons, Makoto (誠) and Akira (徹) are also active in the family kiln.

Professional name	Life dates	Other names
Kiyomizu Shichibei I	1818–1891	Birth name: Takejirō (竹次郎)
Kiyomizu Shichibei II	1843–1918	Birth name: Takejirō (竹次郎)
Kiyomizu Shichibei III		
Kiyomizu Shichibei IV		
Tsuchitani Zuikō I	1867–1918	Birth name: Kōzaburō (光三郎)
Tsuchitani Zuikō II	1898–1978	Birth name: Kikutarō (菊次郎)
Tsuchitani Zuikō III	b. 1928	Birth name: Minoru (稔)

== See also ==
Unit 88-9 (Kiyomizu Masahiro)

== External sources ==
- http://www.metmuseum.org/search-results?y=-58&x=-1055&ft=rokubei&rpp=10&pg=2 works by Kiyomizu Rokubei I, II, III & VI in the Metropolitan Museum of Art
- https://search.artmuseums.go.jp/search_e/sakuhin_list.php#; details of pieces by Rokubei V through VIII in the National Museum of Modern Art, Kyoto; the National Museum of Art, Osaka, and the National Museum of Modern Art, Tokyo
- http://statue-de-paris.sculpturederue.fr/page190.html Belt II: Open-air sculpture by Rokubei VIII in Paris
