= Sōdeisha =

Japanese art group

- Years active: 1948-98
- Location: Japan
- Major figures: Yagi Kazuo, Yamada Hikaru, Suzuki Osamu
- Influences: Klee, Miro and Picasso
- Influenced: Akiyama Yo and Takiguchi Kazuo

Sōdeisha (走泥社; founded July 1948 – disbanded 1998), the “Crawling through Mud Association,” was founded by Kazuo Yagi and led by Yagi and two other founding members, Hikaru Yamada and Suzuki Osamu. Sodeisha was formed in opposition to the Mingei or folk-craft movement that was the dominant ceramic style and philosophy in mid-20th century Japan, and also in reaction to the aesthetic of rusticity associated with the tea ceremony inspired Shino and Bizen ceramics of the Momoyama Revival pottery of artists such as Kaneshige Toyo and Arakawa Toyozu. Sodeisha had nearly 40 members in 1964 and was disbanded in 1998.

== Founding and philosophy ==
Kyoto, where Sodeisha was founded, had a prominent ceramics industry since the late sixteenth century. Many workshops have emerged across the city, in particular on the hills east of the city, in neighborhoods such as Awata and Gojozaka. In the 1940s, ceramic production in Kyoto and beyond was still very much controlled by small-sized, family style workshops that often have an inherited artistic name. Generations of skilled craftsmen continue to pass on their skills to produce decorated vessels that manifest classical forms of Japan, China, and Korea.

Yagi, Yamada, and Osamu all grew up in this part of Kyoto and were sons of potters who were working in this milieu. When WWII ended, young potters like them began to question about their professional and creative careers. The sprouting of various artistic organizations around that time inspired Yagi to seek a collective force to power new developments in ceramic design and production.

In 1948, the Sodeisha artists mailed out postcards with their 'motto' or artistic credo:

"The postwar art world needed the expediency of creating associations in order to escape from personal confusion, but today, finally, that provisional role appears to have ended. The birds of dawn taking flight out of the forest of falsehood now discover their reflections only in the spring of truth. We are united not to provide a ‘warm bed of dreams’, but to come to terms with our existence in broad daylight".

Sodeisha artists sought to engage with difficult questions around the artistic and aesthetic issues around ceramic production and potters’ professional identity. They attempted to examine the larger environment of arts and crafts in order to establish new forms, products, and procedures that could allow potters in the new era to refrain from the existing, systematic rules.

In an article written for The Japan Times, Robert Yellin wrote of the Sodeisha philosophy that:

"They had as their unwritten laws that they would not submit work to official exhibitions, to avoid being judged on others criteria, and not to copy antique wares of the past. That was the basic credo, quite bold and naive. A major hurdle in the beginning, believe it or not, was whether or not the mouth of a work should be closed or not-if left open it gives the feeling of a common vessel, and thus to close it was the only way to have it taken seriously as ceramic sculptural art".

Two years after the formation of Sodeisha, Yagi and his cohorts made two resolutions. The first is to cease working after models from pottery history and, second, to discontinue submitting their works to the salon system. With this severance from the canons and institutions of the pottery world, they freed themselves to explore that which lay beyond.

The following year the group inaugurated independent annual group exhibitions which did not need to take heed of the salon's hierarchical separation of sculpture and pottery. Though Yagi still lived and worked with his father in the Gojozaka in close contact with a whole community of traditional vessel potters, Yagi began bending and warping his wheel thrown forms and glazing them with designs that resembled paintings by Picasso, Klee and Miro. The work of these European modernists had been well known among Japanese artists before the war. After the war, new Japanese publications started to reacquaint artists with their work and the first post-war exhibitions of their works in Japan began to appear in the early 1950s.

An exhibition of Picasso's ceramics was mounted in 1951, but already in the late 1940s Yagi was deeply moved by what he saw in the photographs of ceramic work by Picasso, who appropriated the vessel surface as both ground and medium for representation. He created images on his ceramics which triggered punning and rhyming reverberations between what was painted and what was potted. Yagi puts, “All material and technical aspects [in Picasso’s ceramics] are directly embodied by Picasso himself, resulting in a willful form corresponding to the movement of the artist’s spirit.” In a 1949 tribute to Picasso's use of pottery — Jar with Inlaid Figure — Yagi carved the image of a face using a Picasso style of draftsmanship on to the surface of one of his vessels and infected the pottery wall with a dent under the face.

== Style ==
Their work was characterized by biomorphic and slab-built geometric forms. An emphasis on the sculptural as opposed to the functional meant that typically their pieces didn't have holes, or 'mouths', that might allow the work in question to be seen as a vase or pot. In the late 1940s and early 1950s, the works of Klee, Miro and Picasso were an influence on members of the group, as were the ceramics produced by Isamu Noguchi in the studio of Rosanjin in 1952. There were ideological and aesthetic similarities to the Abstract expressionist ceramic artists of California (led by Peter Voulkos), but they formed independently of each other.

== Influence ==
Two notable artists in the Sodeisha mold are Akiyama Yo (1953- ) and Takiguchi Kazuo (1953- ), both prize-winning ceramists and former students of Yagi.

== See also ==
- Shikokai
- Gendai Bijutsu Kondankai
- Gutai Art Association
