= Gojō Street =

Street in Kyoto city, Japan

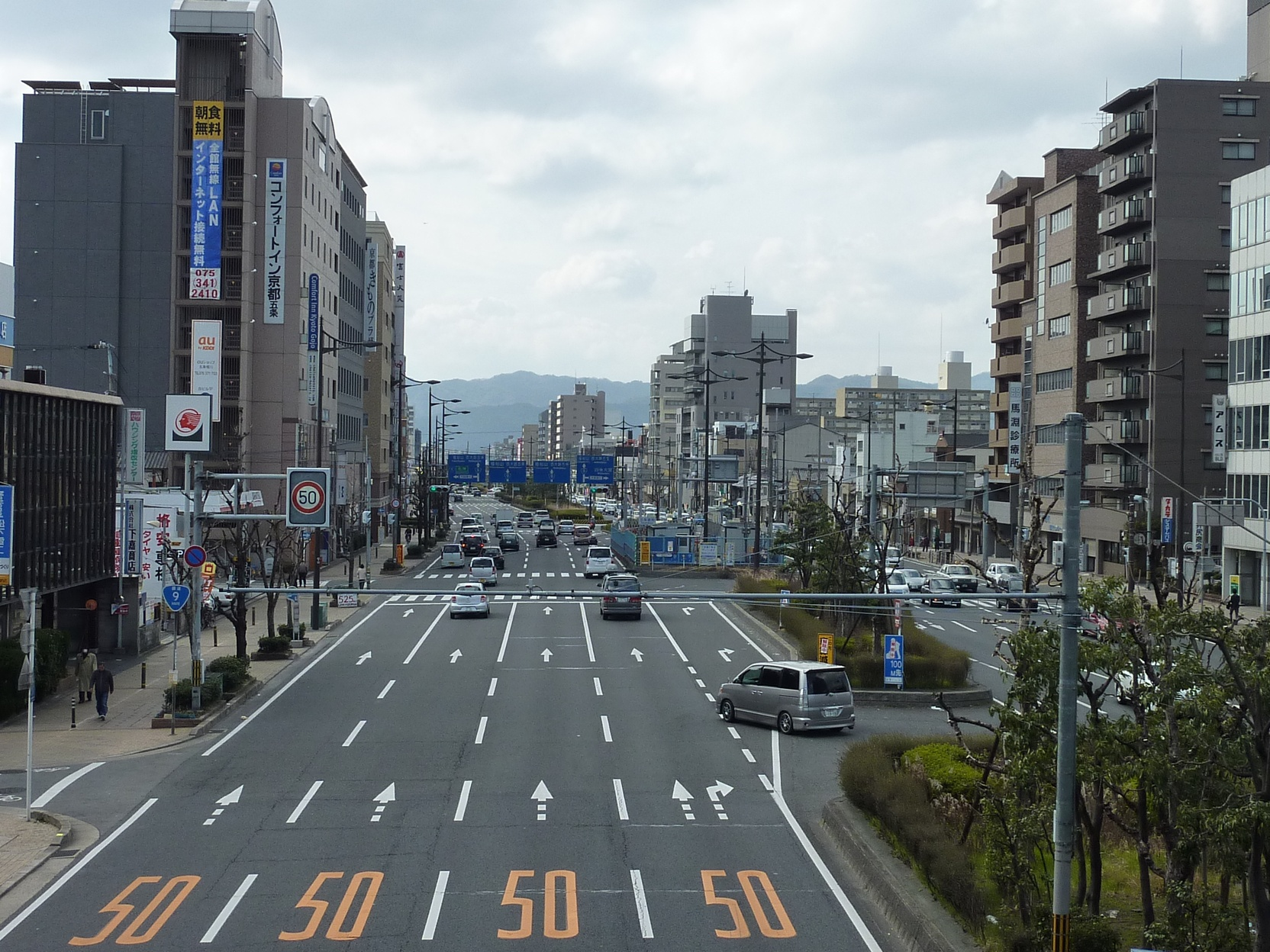
Gojō Street in Shimogyo, Kyoto

Gojō Street (五条通 ごじょうどおり Gojō dōri) is a major street that crosses the center of the city of Kyoto from east to west, running from Higashi Ōji Street (east) to Kadononishi Street (west).

== History ==
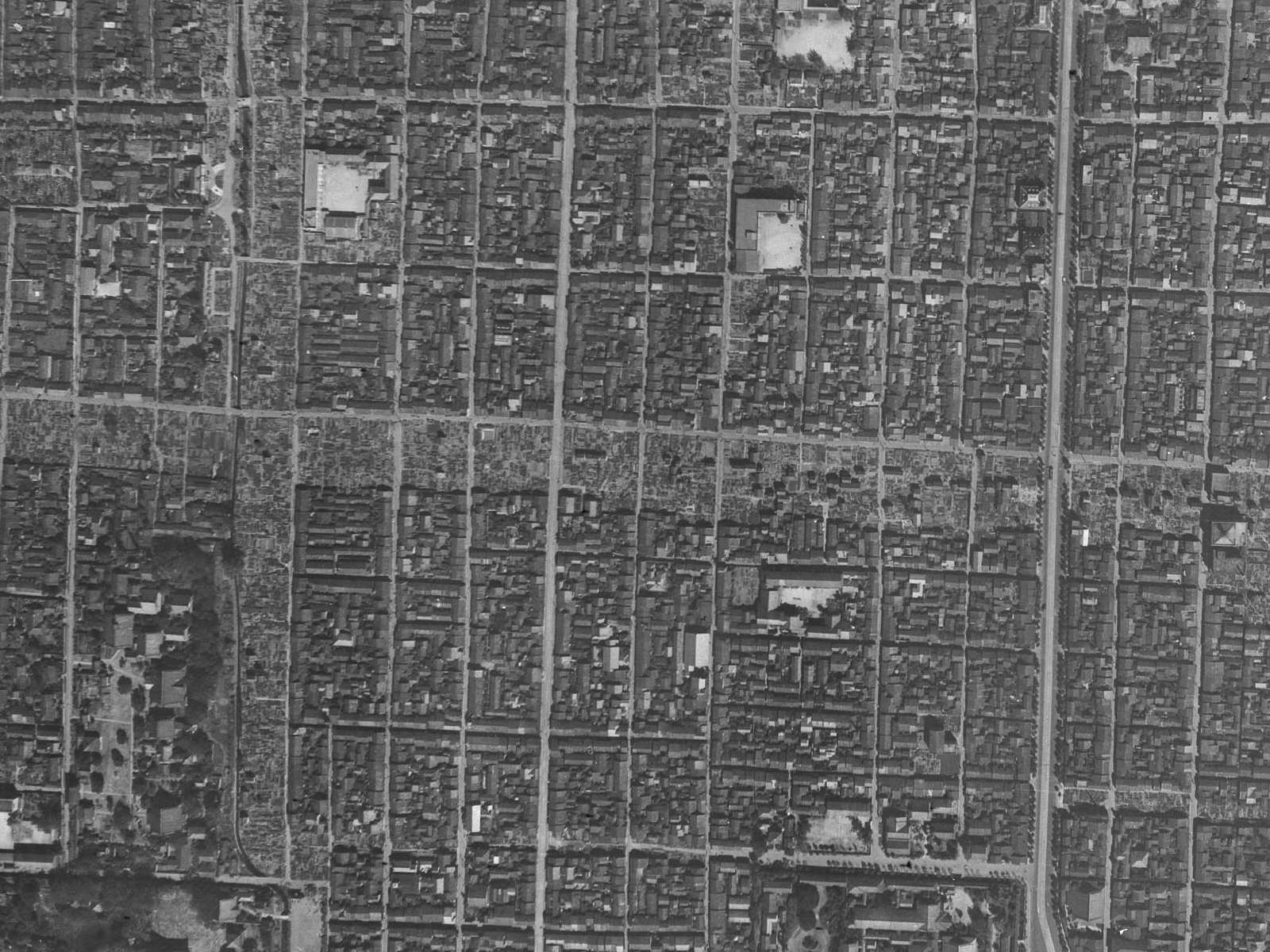
Aerial photograph in 1946

During the period of the Heian-kyō, it was a narrow street known as Rokujō Bōmon Kōji (六条坊門小路). The road that was formerly known as Gojō Ōji was actually located where Matsubara Street stands today and for this reason, the bridge now known as Matsubara-bashi supposedly was the Gojō Ōhashi of that time.

During WWII, houses and buildings along the street were removed to create a firewall, making the street 50 meters wide.

== Present Day ==
Nowadays Gojō Street is located between Manjuji street (north) and Settayamachi street (south). East from its intersection with Horikawa Street it becomes the Japan National Route 1 and west of its intersection with Karasuma Street it becomes Japan National Route 9.

From its east end at the intersection with Higashi Ōji Street it becomes Gojōzaka, a narrow street that leads to the Kiyomizu-dera temple.

Every year in August, the famous Gojozaka Pottery Festival is held at the east end of the street. On the west side of the Gojō Ōhashi Bridge a statue of Benkei and Ushiwakamaru stands.

== Relevant landmarks along the Street ==
- Kiyomizu-dera
- Gojō Ōhashi Bridge
- Kyoto Tokyu Hotel
- Kyoto Koka Women's University
- Kyoto City Hospital

=== Train Stations ===
==== Subway ====
- Gojō Station

==== Keihan Electric Railway ====
- Kiyomizu- Gojō Station

==== JR San'in Main Line ====
- Tanbaguchi Station
