= National Crafts Museum (Japan) =

Museum in Kanazawa, Ishikawa Prefecture, Japan

- 国立工芸館
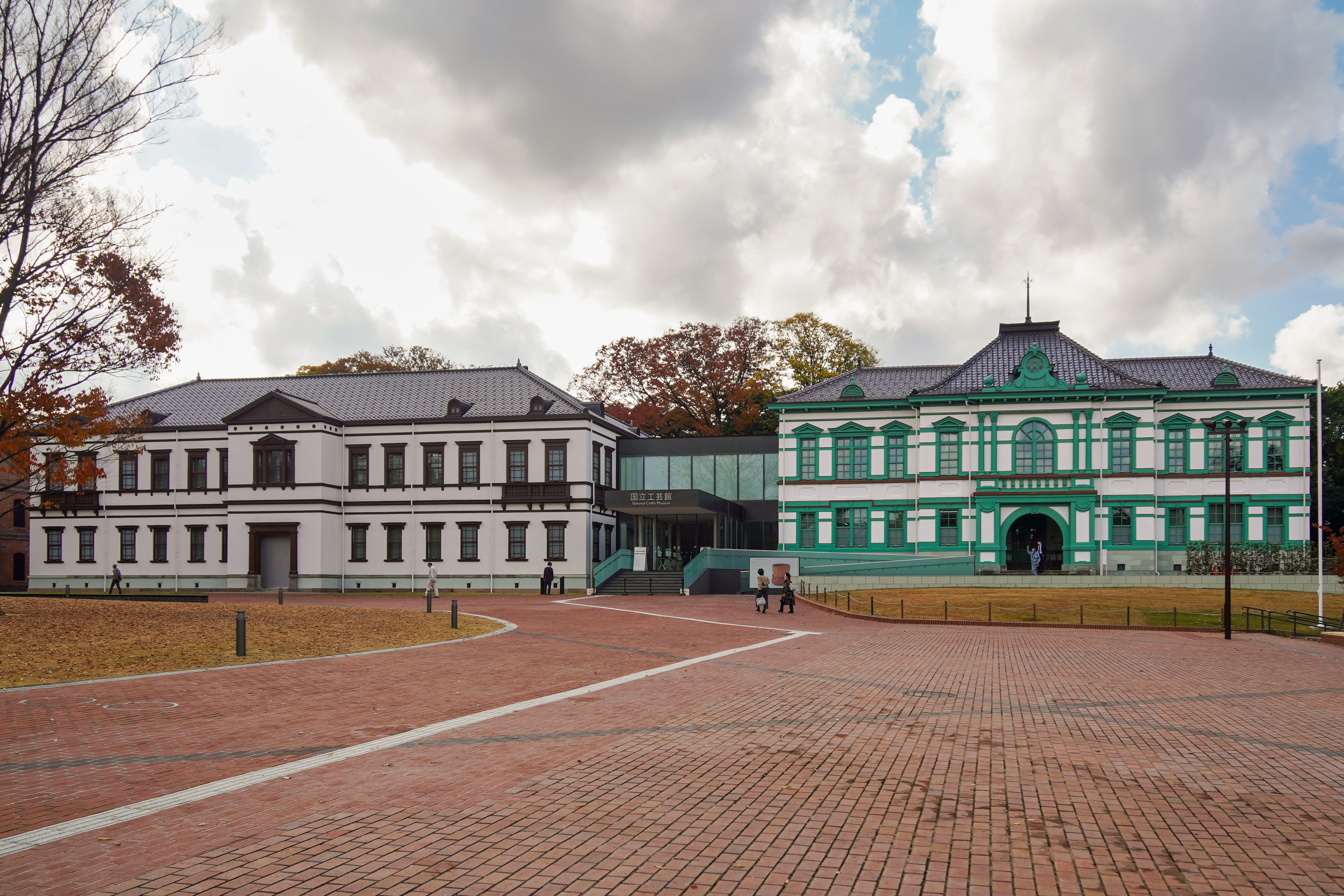
- Left: Old 9th Division Command Headquarters; Right: Old Army Generals Club

General information
- Location: 3-2 Dewa-machi, Kanazawa, Ishikawa Prefecture, Japan
- Coordinates: 36°33′33″N 136°39′42″E
- Opened: 25 October 2020

Website
- momat.go.jp/craft-museum

The National Crafts Museum (国立工芸館, Kokuritsu Kōgei Kan) is a museum of Japanese crafts in Kanazawa, Ishikawa Prefecture, Japan. It forms part of the Independent Administrative Institution National Museum of Art (ja). As part of the government policy of regional revitalization, the facility relocated in 2020 from Kitanomaru Park in Tokyo, where it first opened in 1977. It is now housed in two Western-style buildings of the Meiji period that have themselves been relocated from elsewhere in Kanazawa, reassembled, and restored, the 1898 Old 9th Division Command Headquarters and 1909 Old Army Generals Club. The museum's collection comprises some 4,000 works by craftsmen from all over Japan, including works by holders and preservers of Important Intangible Cultural Properties, often referred to as "Living National Treasures", and members of the Japan Art Academy.

== See also ==
- 21st Century Museum of Contemporary Art, Kanazawa – Japanese museum
- Ishikawa Prefectural Museum of Art
- Ishikawa Prefectural History Museum
- Japanese-Western Eclectic Architecture – Western-influenced Architectural movement in Japan
- Japanese Folk Crafts Museum – Art museum in Tokyo, Japan
- Kenroku-en – Park in Kanazawa, Ishikawa, Japan
- Mingei – Japanese folk art philosophy formed in the 1920s
