= Kitanomaru Park =

Public park in Chiyoda, Tokyo, Japan

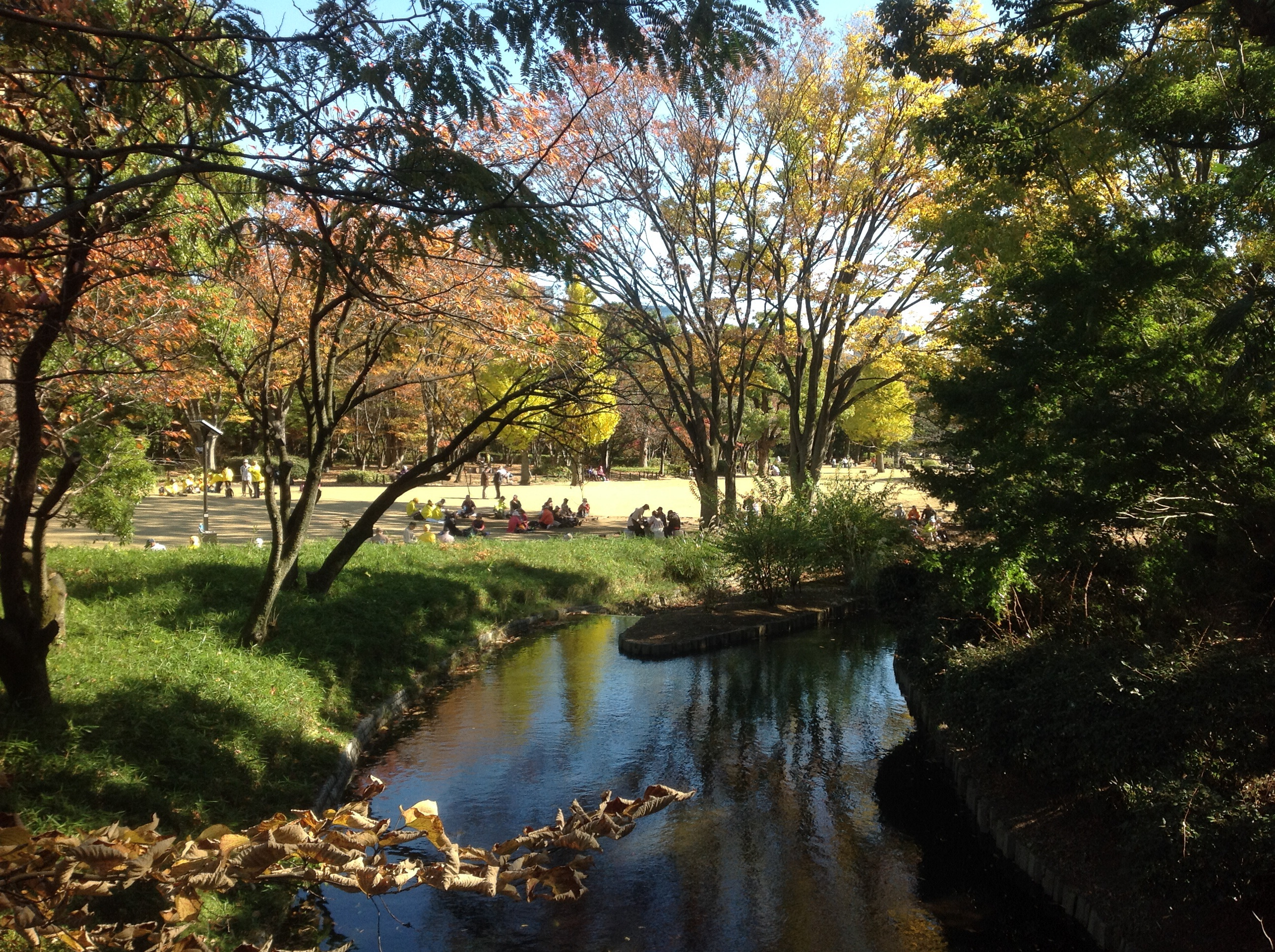
- Interactive map of Kitanomaru Park
- Location: Chiyoda, Tokyo, Japan
- Coordinates: 35.69043°N 139.75300°E
- Area: 193,297 square metres (2,080,630 ft^{2})
- Created: 1969
- Operator: Ministry of the Environment

Kitanomaru Park (北の丸公園, Kitanomaru Kōen) is a public park in Chiyoda, central Tokyo, Japan, just north of the Tokyo Imperial Palace. It is the location of the Nippon Budokan indoor sports and performance venue, the Science Museum, and the National Museum of Modern Art, Tokyo.

== History ==
Kitanomaru Park was originally the northernmost section of Edo Castle, known as the Kitanomaru (北の丸, northern enceinte). It was used as a medicinal garden and as a secure residential compound for members of the Tokugawa extended family. The park is almost encircled by deep moats and defensive fortifications from the original castle.

Prior to 1969, when Kitanomaru Park was opened, this district had been called Daikanchō (代官町, literal translation: Town of Local Governors) because many daikan (local governors) lived in the place soon after the construction of Edo Castle. Today, the name Daikanchō is known more commonly as the name of an interchange of the Inner Circular Route of the Shuto Expressway.

Two gated entrances survive from time of Edo Castle, the Tayasu-mon and the Shimizu-mon. The Tayasu-mon was the northernmost gate of Edo Castle and consists of both a Korai-mon style outer gate and a Yagura-mon style fortified inner gatehouse, with highly stacked stone walls forming a narrow defensive courtyard between the two. An inscription on the outer side of the Tayasu-mon states the gate was constructed in 1685, making it one of the oldest surviving structures of the original castle.

== Population ==
As of May 1, 2008, Kitanomaru Park area had a registered population of 598, of which 361 are male and 237 are female, although this population almost exclusively consists of serving members and dependents of the Imperial Guard or the National Police Agency.

== Education ==
Chiyoda Board of Education operates public elementary and junior high schools. Fujimi Elementary School (富士見小学校) is the zoned elementary school for Kitanomaru Park. There is freedom of choice system for junior high schools in Chiyoda Ward, and so there are no specific junior high school zones.

== Gallery ==
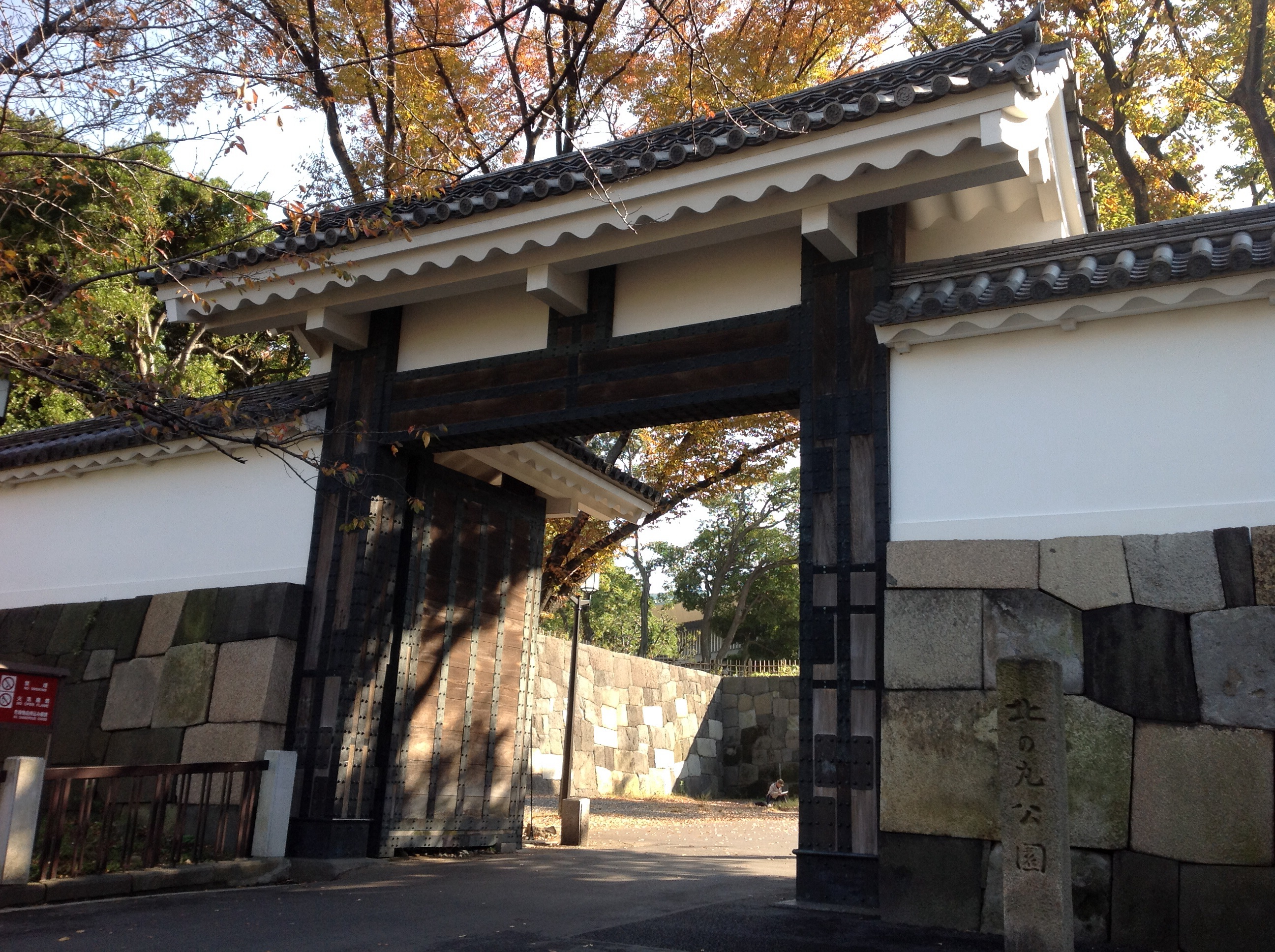
Tayasu-mon entrance to Kitanomaru Park

Several scenes inside the park, 2024

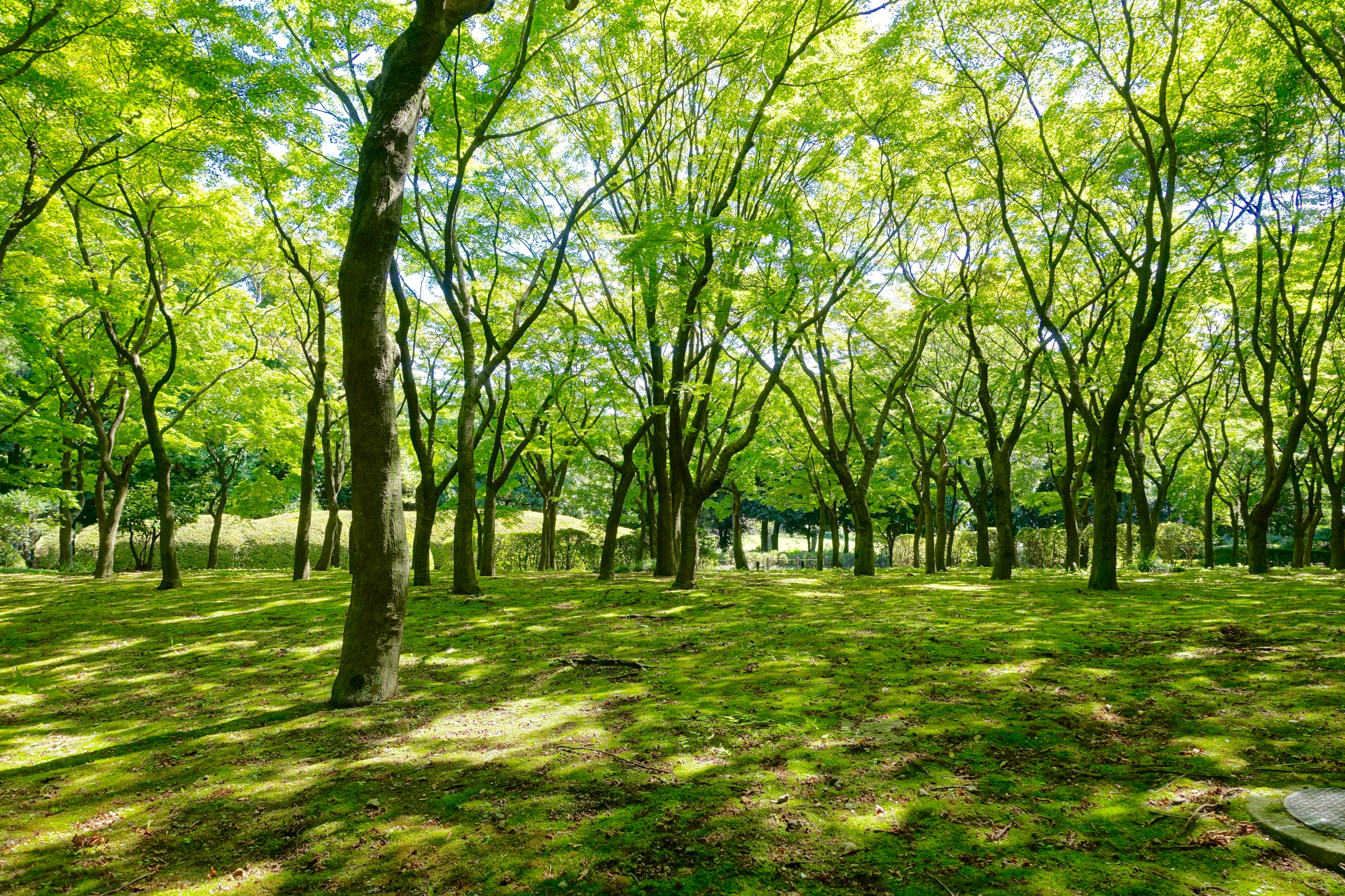
in summer
