= Kiyomizu ware =

Type of Japanese pottery

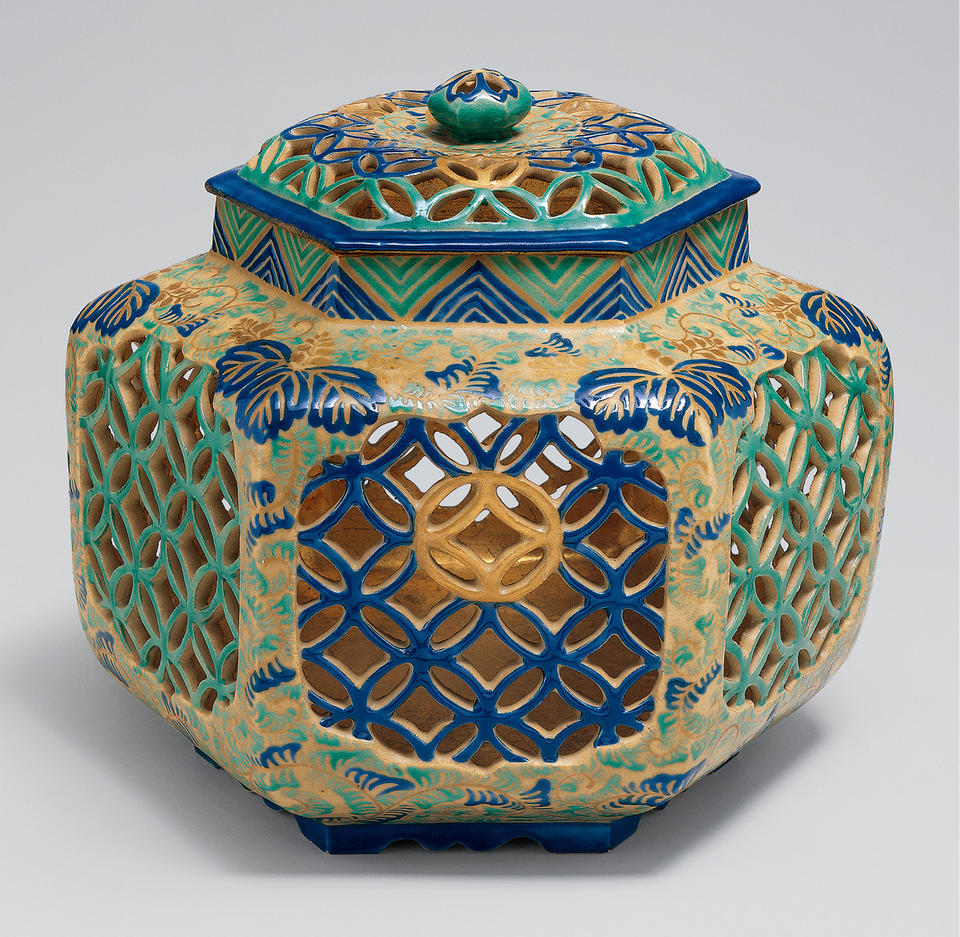
Ko-Kiyomizu (old Kiyomizu) lidded brazier (te-aburi) with paulownia and geometric design, stoneware with overglaze enamels and gold, Edo period, 18th century

Kiyomizu ware (清水焼, Kiyomizu-yaki) is a type of Kyō ware traditionally from Gojōzaka district near Kiyomizu Temple, in Kyoto.

The history of Kiyomizu ware dates back to the Momoyama period. The earlier production phase is known as Ko-Kiyomizu (old Kiyomizu). One of the foremost producers of Kiyomizu ware is the Unraku kiln (雲楽窯, Unraku-gama), led by the current Unrako Saito III.
