= Gojō Station (Kyoto) =

Metro station in Kyoto, Japan

K10 Gojō Station 五条駅
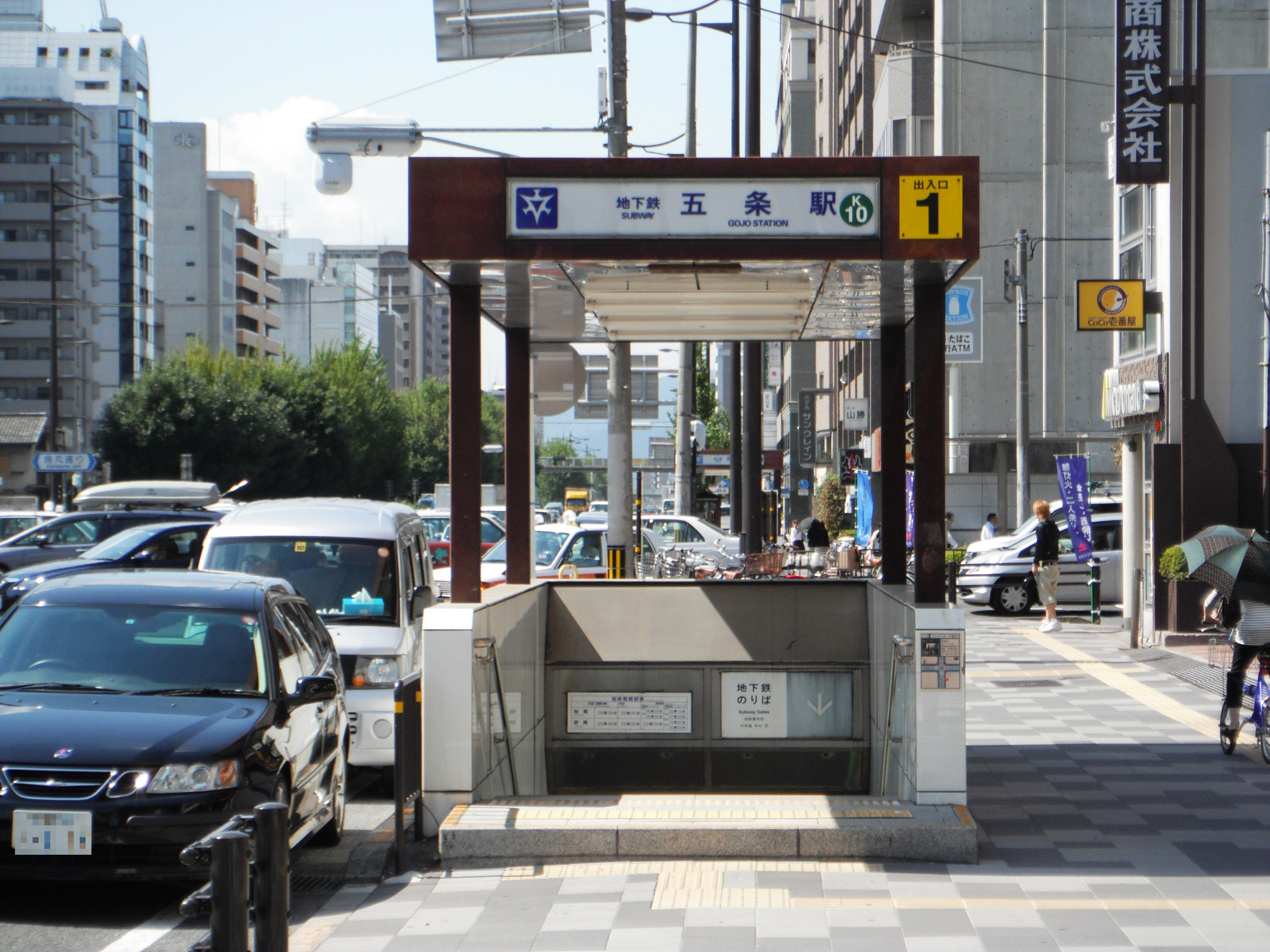
- Entrance No. 1, September 2011

General information
- Location: Osaka-cho, Shimogyo-ku, Kyoto, Kyoto （京都府京都市下京区大坂町） Japan
- Coordinates: 34°59′42.62″N 135°45′35.06″E
- Operator: Kyoto Municipal Subway
- Line: Karasuma Line
- Platforms: 1 island platform
- Tracks: 2
- Connections: Bus stop

Other information
- Station code: K10

History
- Opened: May 29, 1981; 45 years ago

Passengers
- 2025: 20,484 daily

Services
Preceding station	Kyoto Municipal Subway	Following station
Kyoto K11 towards Takeda	Karasuma Line	Shijō K09 towards Kokusaikaikan
Location

Gojō Station (五条駅, Gojō-eki) is a subway station on the Kyoto Municipal Subway Karasuma Line in Shimogyo-ku, Kyoto, Japan.

== Lines ==
- Kyoto Municipal Subway Karasuma Line (Station Number: K10)

== Layout ==
The station has an island platform serving two tracks.

=== Platforms ===
1	■ Karasuma Line	for Kyoto, Takeda, and Kintetsu Nara
2	■ Karasuma Line	for Karasuma Oike, Kitaoji, and Kokusaikaikan

== See also ==
- List of railway stations in Japan
