= Kyō ware =

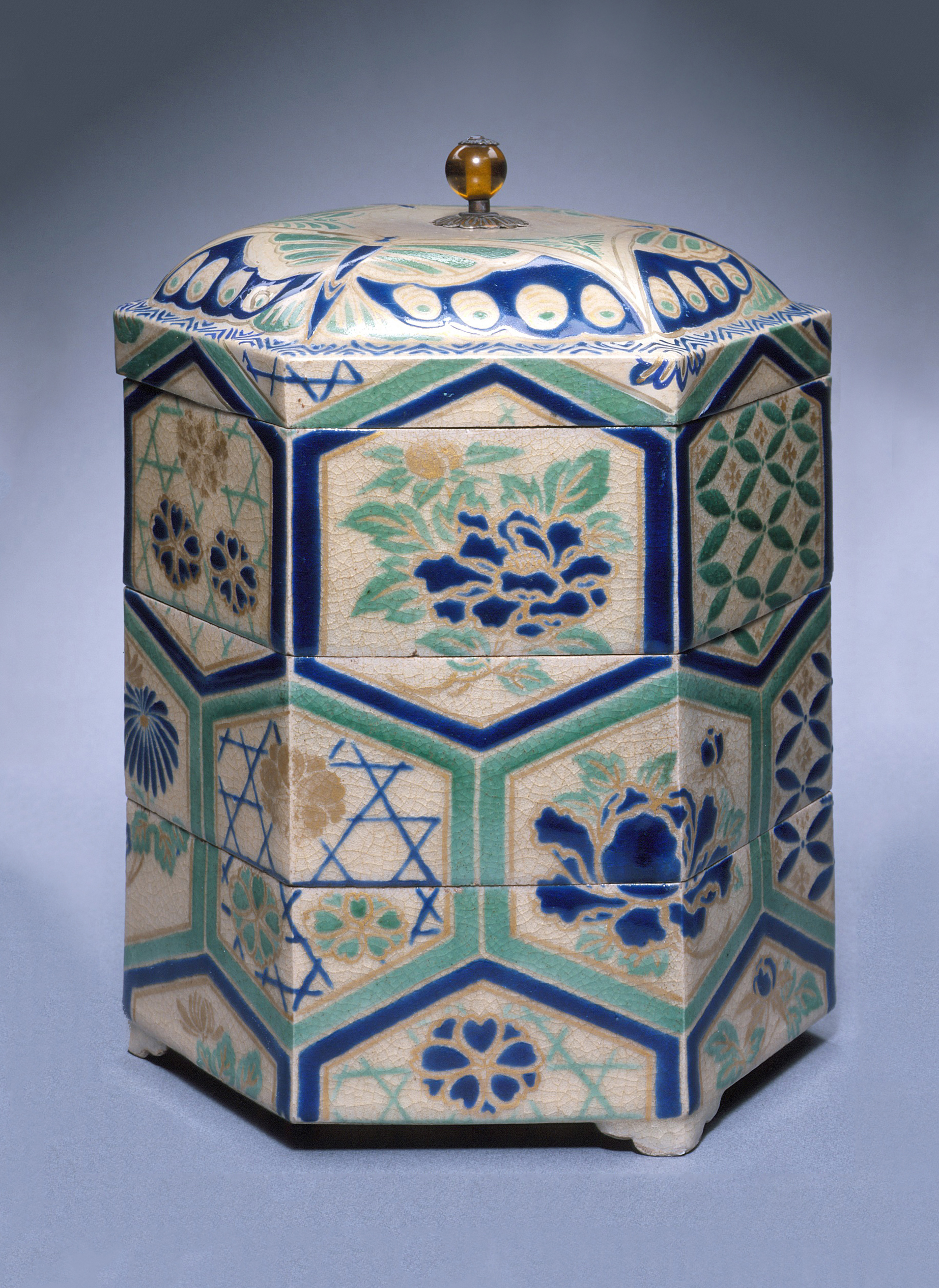
Kyō stoneware tiered food box with overglaze enamels, Edo period, 18th century

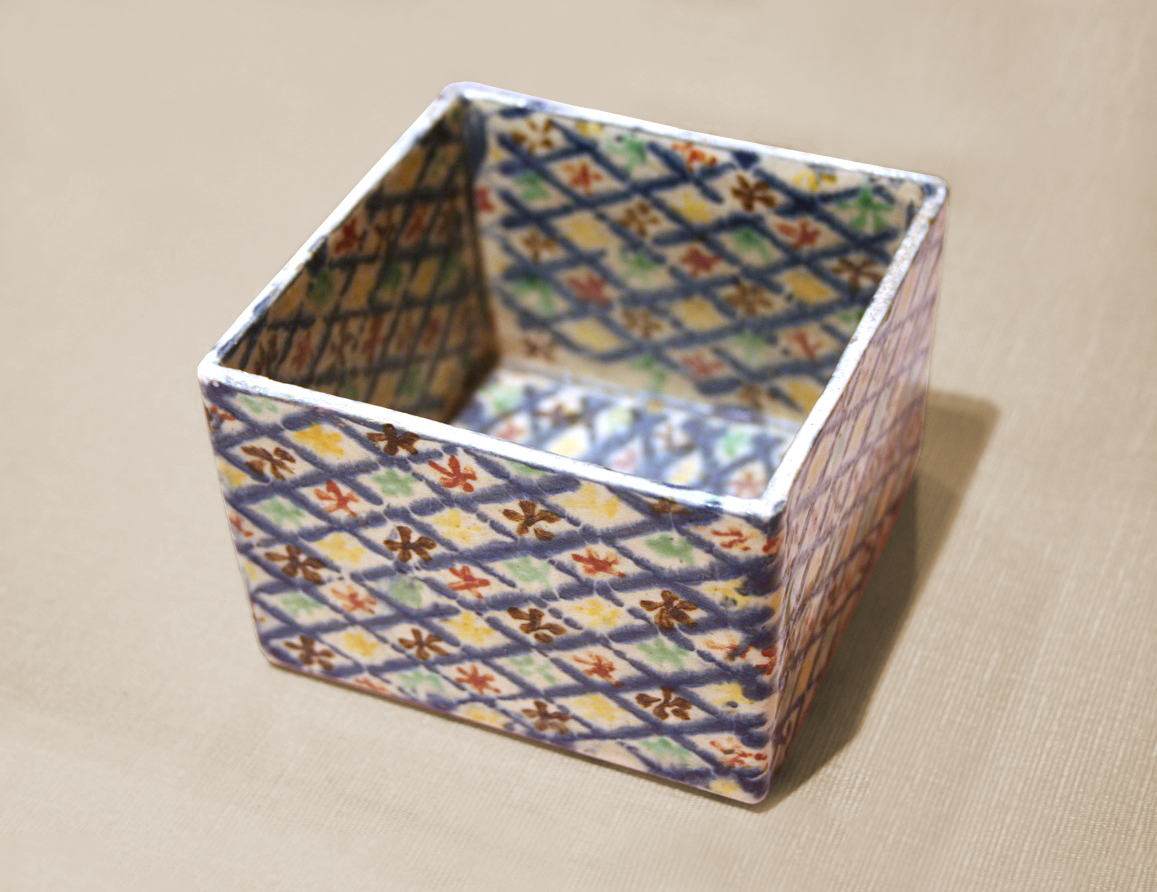
Kyō stoneware dish (mukōzuke) with glaze. Attributed to Ogata Kenzan (1663-1743), Edo period, c. 1725

Kyō ware (京焼, Kyō-yaki) is a type of Japanese pottery traditionally from Kyoto. It is therefore also known as Kyoto ware.

== History ==
Pottery in Kyoto dates back to the late 5th century.

In the 17th century, Nonomura Ninsei set up a kiln opposite the Ninna-ji. He established a specific style of Kyō ware.

Clay that was suitable for the production of porcelain was not easily available in the region. The potters of Kyoto therefore had to concentrate on developing elegant forms and originality.

In the 17th century, Kyō ware and Japanese tea ceremony had a close relationship. The use of China instead of earthenware became more popular. In 1771 Kiyomizu Rokubei I opened his own studio in the Gojōzaka district of Kyoto, near Kiyomizu-dera.

The Gojōzaka district near Kiyomizu has a large Chinaware market with around 400 shops, which makes it one of the largest in Japan. Every summer a large market is held which sells Kyō ware.

A contemporary artist is Nanzan Ito.

== Characteristics ==
The term Kyō ware is more of an umbrella term to describe a wide variety of styles that were produced in Kyoto.

One of the more known styles is the one with distinctive design and flamboyant colouring.

The pigments contain large amounts of glass. The colours are vivid and seem transparent. Not a wide range of colours are used for one vessel, but the aim is to use the right one to suit the design. The pieces are then fired in the kiln at a low temperature.

There is one kind of Kyō ware which is very delicate and fine and less than a millimetre thick, which makes it translucent against light.

Kiyomizu ware is a subcategory and refers to products traditionally made in the direct vicinity of Kiyomizu temple.

Rengetsu ware, in contrast, has a very rustic look. It is, however, also considered a subcategory of Kyō ware.

== See also ==
- Celadon
- List of Traditional Crafts of Japan
