= National Museum of Modern Art, Tokyo =

- Tōkyō Kokuritsu Kindai Bijutsukan
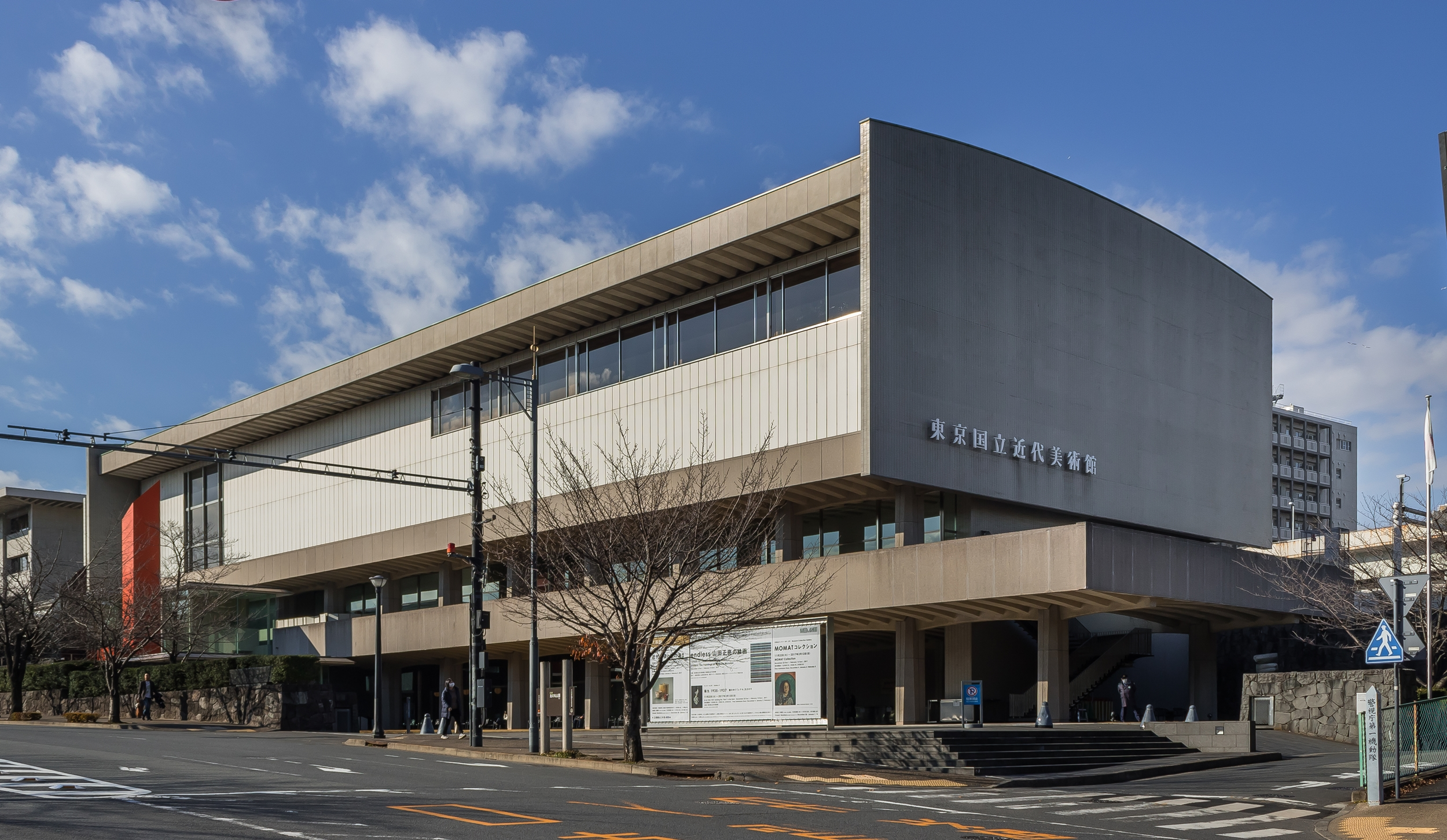
- Main Hall

- Location within Tokyo Yamanote Loop Location within Tokyo wards area
- Established: 1952
- Location: 3-1 Kitanomaru Koen, Chiyoda, Tokyo, Japan
- Coordinates: 35°41′26″N 139°45′17″E
- Type: Art museum
- Website: www.momat.go.jp/en

The National Museum of Modern Art, Tokyo (東京国立近代美術館, Tōkyō Kokuritsu Kindai Bijutsukan), also known as MOMAT, is the foremost museum collecting and exhibiting modern Japanese art. The museum, in Chiyoda, Tokyo, Japan, is known for its collection of 20th-century art and includes Western-style and Nihonga artists. It has a branch, the National Crafts Museum, in the city of Kanazawa.

== History ==
The National Museum of Modern Art, Tokyo, was the first national museum of art in Japan and dates back to 1952, when it was established as an institution governed by the Ministry of Education. The architect of the building was Kunio Maekawa. On two later occasions, neighbouring premises were purchased and the museum was enlarged. The most recent redesign of MOMAT was conceived by Yoshirō Taniguchi (father of Yoshio Taniguchi, who designed the extension of MOMA in New York).

== Collections ==
The collection contains many notable Japanese artists since the Meiji period, and a few contemporary Western prints.

In the early years of the 20th century, Matsukata Kojiro collected Japanese ukiyo-e woodblock prints which had been scattered throughout the world. The 1925 exhibition of the woodblock prints Matsukata collected abroad is thought to have been the first of its kind in Japan. Today, around 8,000 ukiyo-e prints from the Matsukata collection are housed in the MOMAT.

=== Crafts Gallery ===
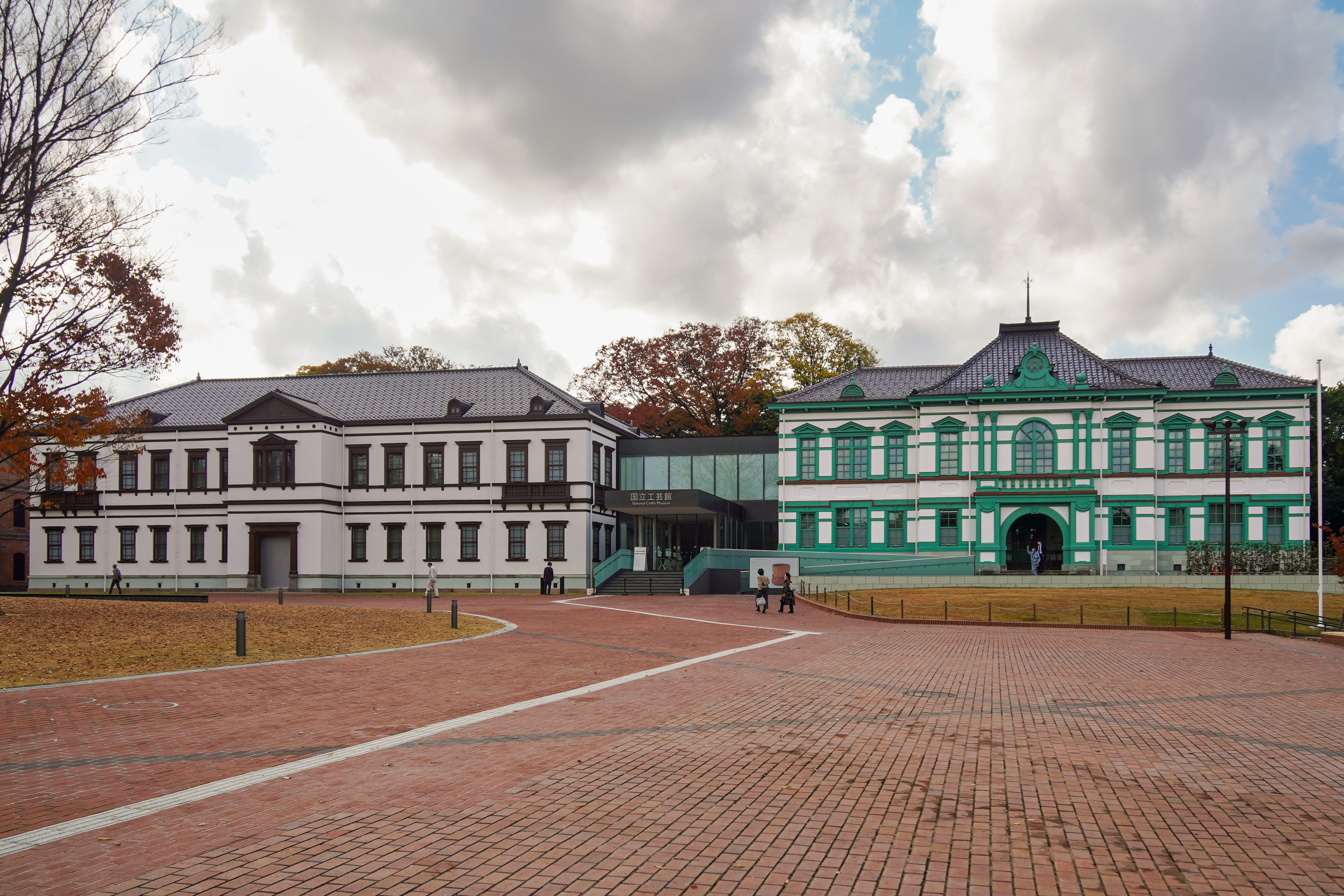
National Crafts Museum in Kanazawa

In 1977, the museum opened an annex, the Kōgeikan Crafts Gallery, that collects and exhibits textiles, ceramics, lacquer, and other Japanese crafts, as well as crafts and designs from around the world dating from the late 19th century to the present. Its collection focus in particular is the work of Japanese Living National Treasures. The Crafts Gallery maintains its own research library.

In 2020, as part of the Japanese government's policy to revitalize local areas, the Crafts Gallery was relocated to Kanazawa, and the National Crafts Museum was opened there. Its official name is still the National Museum of Modern Art, Tokyo Craft Gallery.

=== National Film Center ===
Until April 2018, the National Museum of Modern Art housed the National Film Center (NFC), which was Japan's only public institution devoted to cinema. In April 2018, the NFC became independent of the art museum and was officially elevated to the rank of a national museum under the name the National Film Archive of Japan.

=== Union catalog ===
The "Union Catalog of the Collections of the National Art Museums, Japan" is a consolidated catalog of material held by this museum and the other three Japanese national art museums—the National Museum of Modern Art, Kyoto (MOMAK), the National Museum of Art, Osaka (NMAO), and the National Museum of Western Art (NMWA). The online version of the union catalog is under construction, with only selected works available at this time.

== See also ==
- List of Independent Administrative Institutes in Japan
- Visage Painting and the Human Face in 20th Century Art
