= Gojōzaka =

Street in Kyoto city, Japan

Gojōzaka (五条坂 ごじょうざか Gojōzaka) is a street running from east to west in the vicinity of the Kiyomizu-dera temple, in the city of Kyoto, Japan. The street runs for about 400m from Kiyomizu-zaka Street (east) to the intersection of Gojō and Higashi Ōji Streets (west). According to some local opinions, Gojōzaka actually begins on the east side of the Gojō Ōhashi Bridge and from that point it runs all the way to Kiyomizu-zaka Street. Also, at the northeast corner of the intersection of Gojō Street and Yamato Ōji Street, a stone monument that reads "east from here, Gojōzaka" stands.

== History ==
In the mid Muromachi period, what would become the famous pottery style of Kiyomizu ware was born in the area. By the year 1643 (Edo period) the name of Kiyomizu-yaki was established and the pottery industry began to flourish in the surroundings.

During WWII, ceramic grenades (Type 4 grenade) and ceramic fuel tanks for rockets were produced using the kilns of the local pottery businesses.

In the decade of the 1960s, the pollution from the smoke of the Noborigama kilns (climbing kilns) used around the street became a problem and as a result, the old style kilns were eventually replaced with electric and gas devices.

== Present day ==
Kiyomizu ware continues to be produced and sold in the area, being a popular spot for shopping and for learning about this traditional craft, which attracts both local residents and tourists. There are also shops offering Nishijin-ori textiles and folding fans, as well as art galleries located in the vicinity.

Although most of the Noborigama kilns (climbing kilns) of the area were removed, there are still at least 3 of these left, preserved as important cultural and historical assets.

Every year in August, the famous Gojozaka Pottery Festival is held along the street.

== Relevant landmarks along the street ==
- Kyoto Ceramic Center
- Chawanzaka
- Kiyomizu-zaka
- Kiyomizu-dera
