= Tama Art University =

Art school in Tokyo, Japan

Coordinates: 35°36′51″N 139°38′12″E

- 多摩美術大学
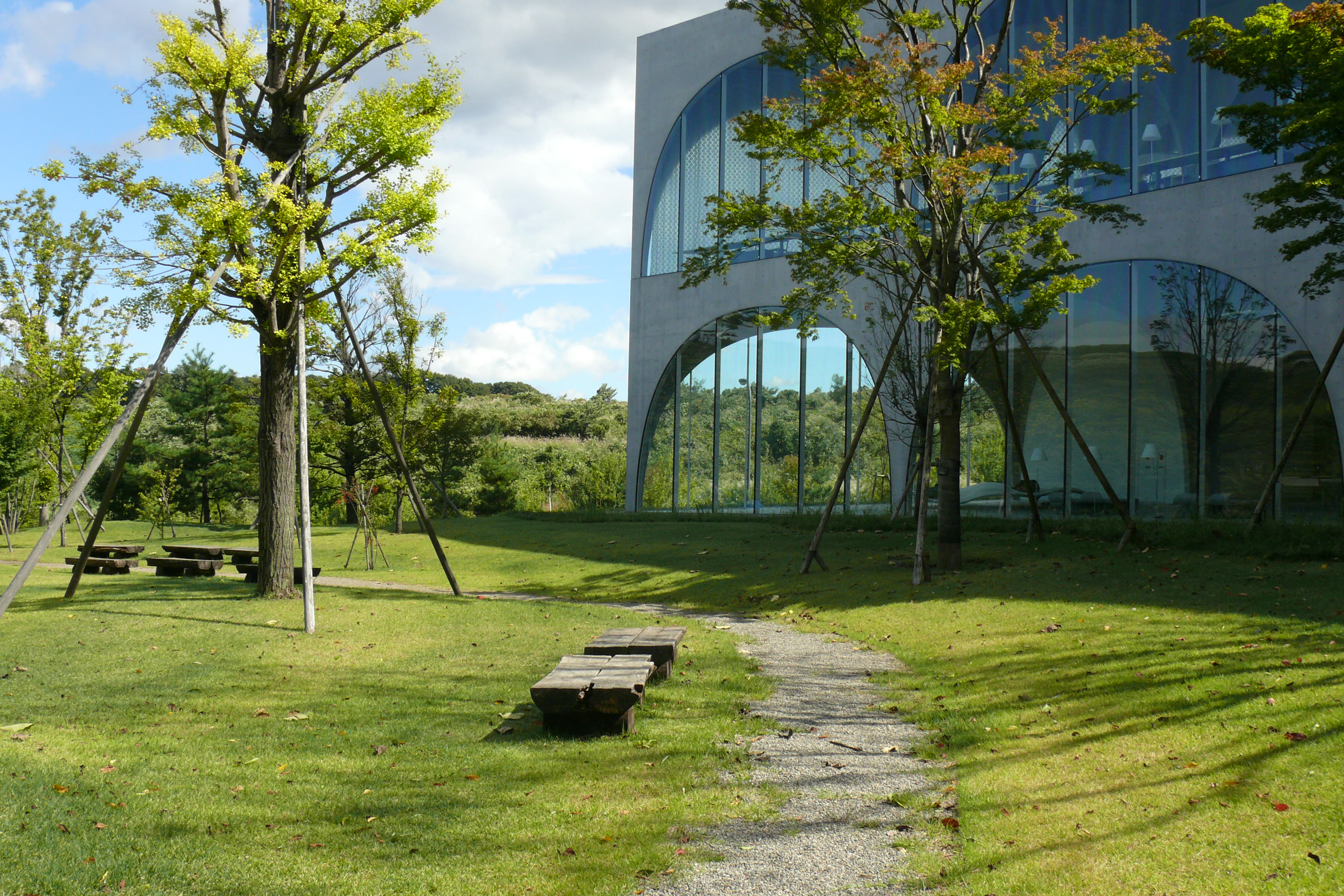
- Motto: 自由と意力
- Motto in English: Freedom and Will
- Type: Private art school
- Established: 1935
- Affiliations: ICSID
- Endowment: N/A
- Chairman: Nobuto Fujitani
- President: Akira Tatehata
- Faculty: 146 full-time 439 part-time
- Undergraduates: 4,220
- Postgraduates: 259
- Location: Tokyo, Japan
- Campus: Suburban 37.78 acres (15.29 ha) (Hachioji campus) 3.98 acres (1.61 ha)(Kaminoge campus)
- Colors: Blue
- Nicknames: Tamabi, TAU, Tama
- Website: tamabi.ac.jp

Tama Art University (多摩美術大学, Tama bijutsu daigaku) or Tamabi (多摩美) is a private art university located in Tokyo, Japan. It is known as one of the top art schools in Japan.

== History ==
The forerunner of Tamabi was Tama Imperial Art School (多摩帝国美術学校, Tama Teikoku Bijutsu Gakkō) founded in 1935. It was chartered as a junior college in 1950 and became a four-year college in 1953.

== Campus ==
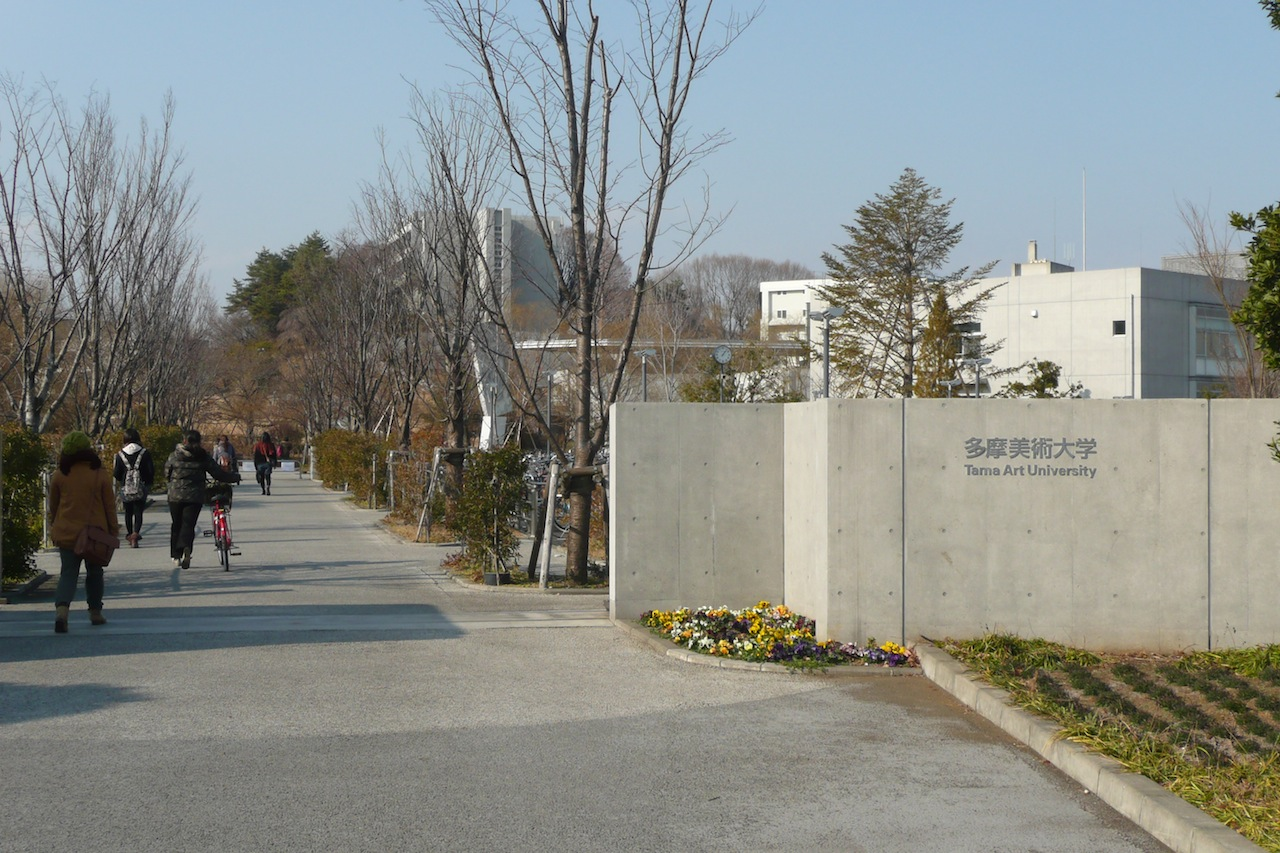
Hachioji Campus

- Hachioji Campus (Hachioji city, Tokyo)
  Faculty of Art and Design and Graduate School of Art and Design (most of the departments are located on this campus)

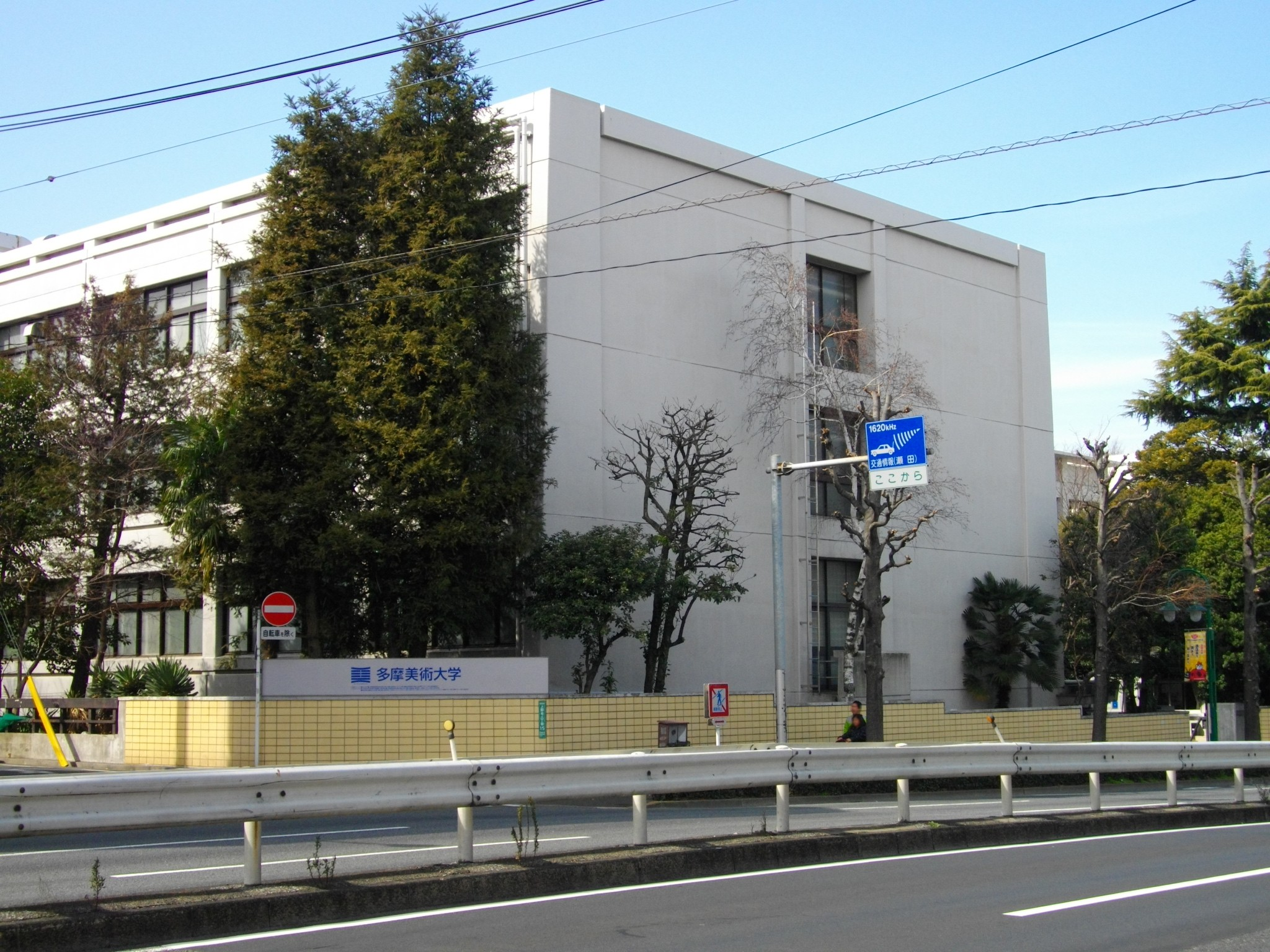
Kaminoge Campus

- Kaminoge Campus (Kaminoge, Setagaya-ward, Tokyo)
  Headquarters office, Faculty of Art and Design, and Graduate School of Art and Design (Department of Integrated Design and Department of Scenography Design, Drama, and Dance)
- Seminar House
  - Mt. Fuji Foothills Seminar House (Yamanakako, Minamitsuru District, Yamanashi)
  - Nara Antiquities Seminar House (Nara city, Nara)

== Academics ==
=== Faculty of Art and Design ===
- Department of Painting
  - Japanese Painting Course
  - Oil Painting Course
  - Graphic Arts Course
- Department of Sculpture
- Department of Ceramic, Glass, and Metal Works
  - Ceramic Program
  - Glass Program
  - Metal Program
- Department of Graphic Design
- Department of Product and Textile Design
  - Product Design Course
  - Textile Design Course
- Department of Architecture and Environmental Design
  - Architecture Design
  - Interior Design
  - Landscape Design
- Department of Information Design
  - Art and Media Course
  - Interaction Design Course
- Department of Art Science
- Department of Integrated Design
- Department of Scenography Design, Drama, and Dance
  - Scenography Design Course
  - Drama and Dance Course

=== Graduate School of Art and Design ===
- Master's Degree Course
- Experimental Workshop (EWS)
- Doctoral Degree Course

== Research institutes and facilities ==
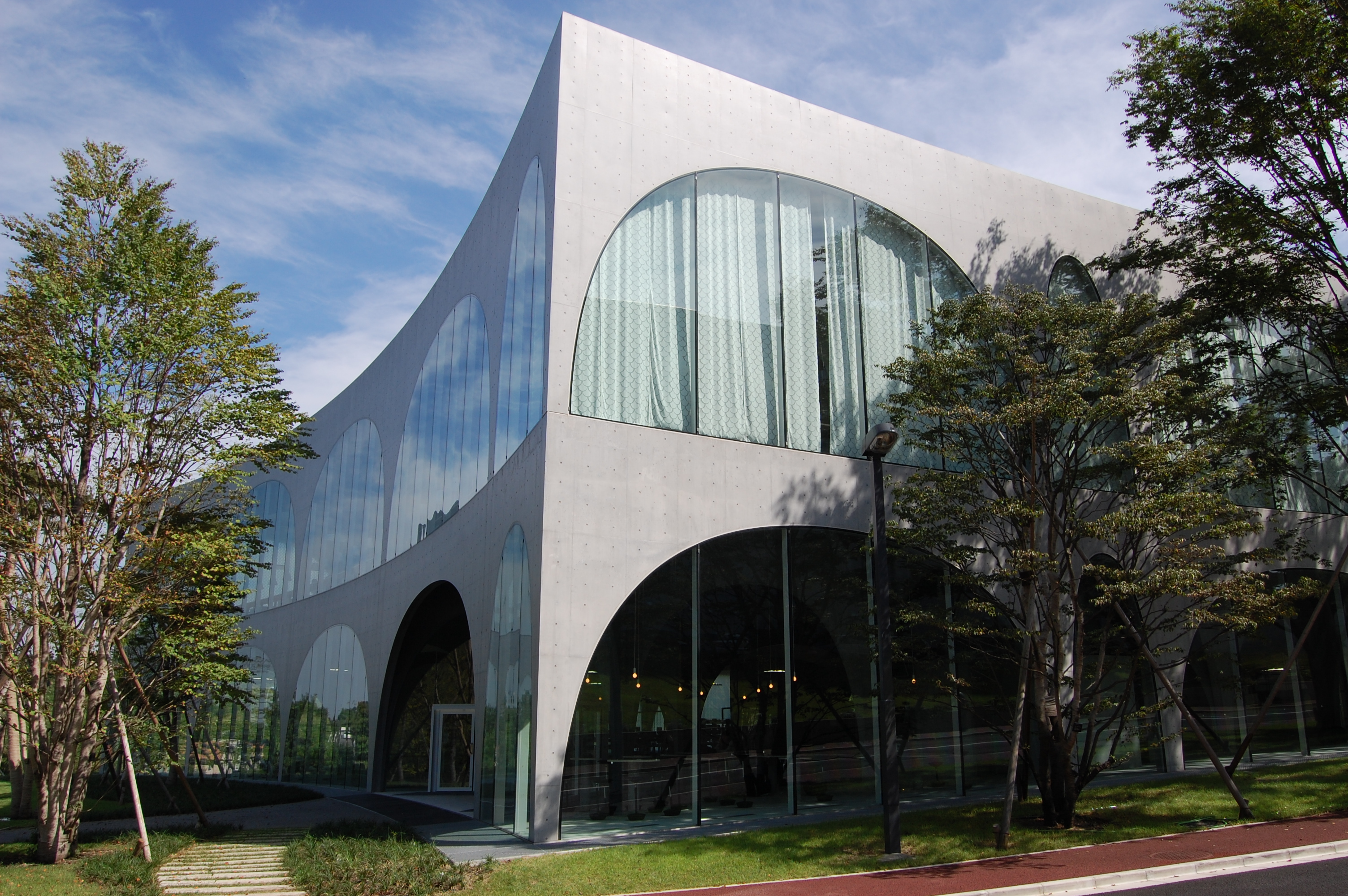
Tama Art University Library at Hachioji Campus

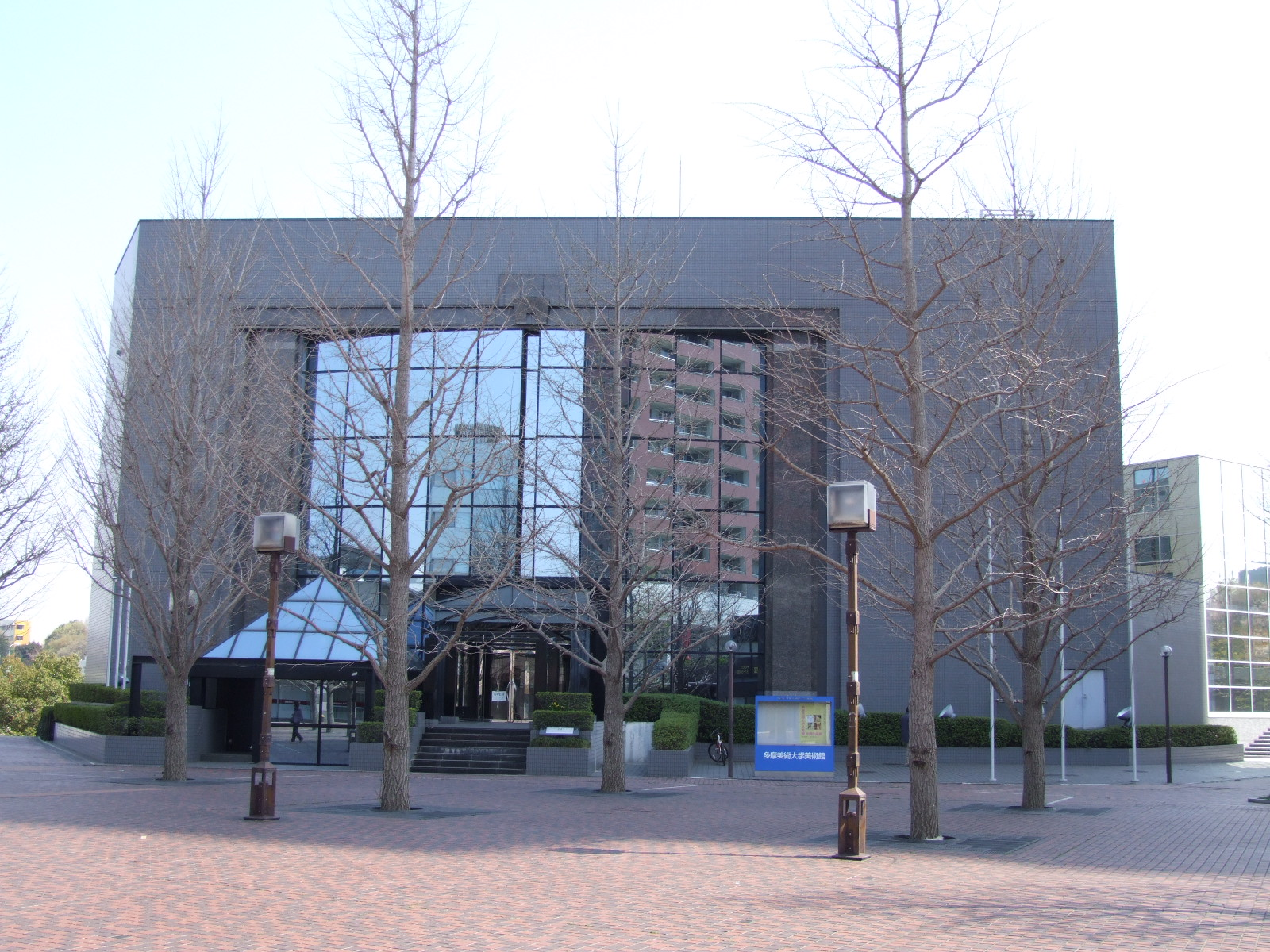
Tama Art University Museum near Tama-Center Station

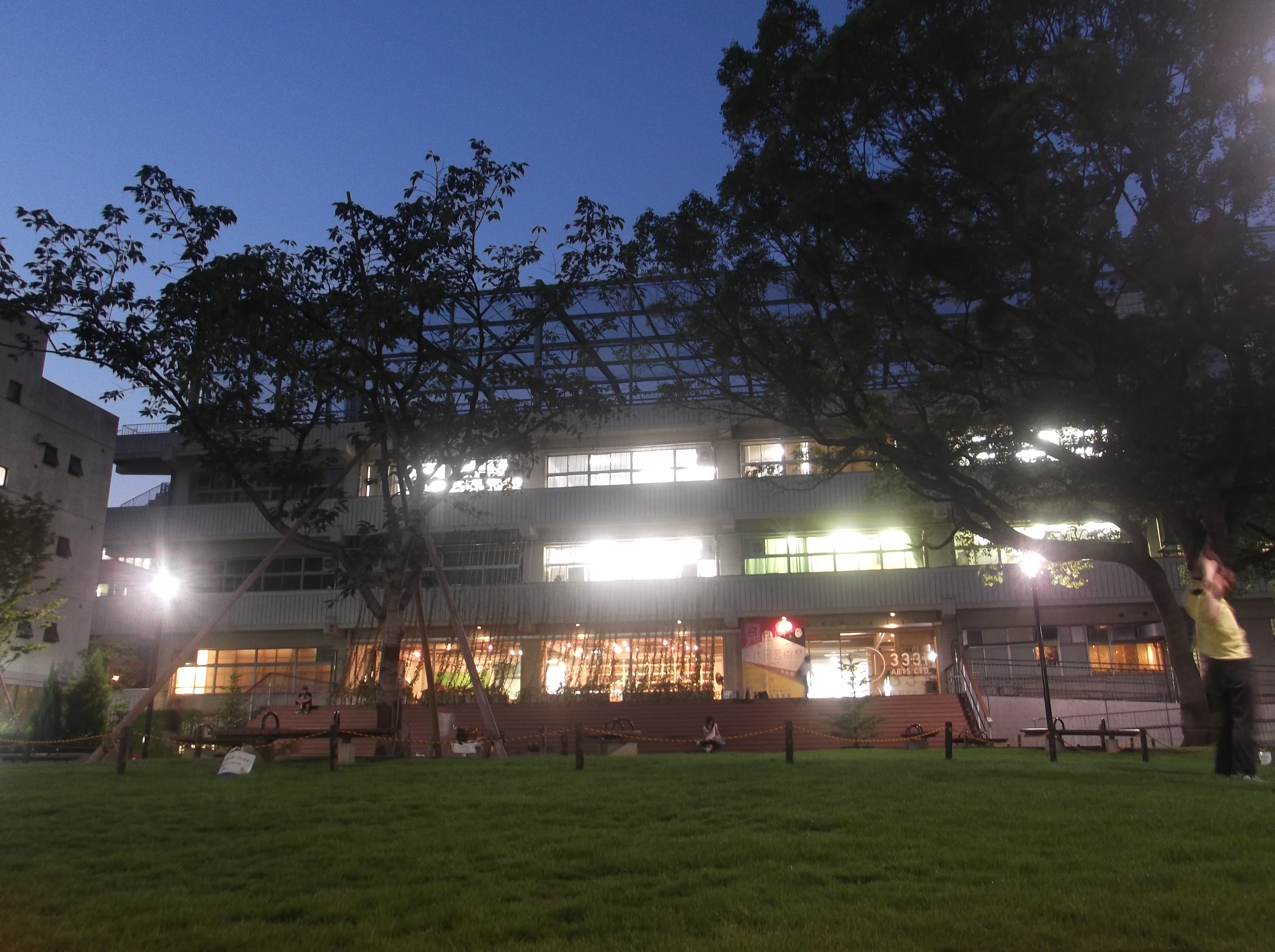
3331 Arts Chiyoda in Akihabara

- Tama Art University Library
- FabLab (beta)

== International joint projects ==
=== Pacific Rim Project ===
Since 2006, students from both Tama Art University and Art Center College of Design who study in the field of design have collaborated on the Pacific Rim Project. The Pacific Rim Project focuses on global issues such as environmental protection, natural disasters and related topics over the course of a 14-week program. The Project is based on collaborative research, the results of which are summarized and shared via public exhibits.

== List of presidents ==
- Reikichi Kita
- Hisui Sugiura, 1935–1947
- Kinji Inoue, 1947–1968
- Ishida Eiichirō, April – November 1968
- Ichiro Fukuzawa, 1968–1970
- Shinichi Mashita, 1970–1975
- Yorihiro Naito, 1979–1987
- Kenshi Goto, 1987–1999
- Nobuo Tsuji, 1999–2003
- Shiro Takahashi, 2003–2007
- Yoshihide Seita, 2007–2011
- Takenobu Igarashi, 2011–2015
- Akira Tatehata, 2015–

== Notable current and past faculty ==
- Shigeo Anzai, photographer
- So Aono, novelist
- Shinji Aoyama, film director
- Ay-O, artist
- Shigeru Ban, architect
- Naoto Fukasawa, industrial designer
- Tsuneari Fukuda, dramatist
- Yasutake Funakoshi, sculptor
- Takashi Hiraide, poet
- Fumiko Hori, painter
- Haruomi Hosono, musician
- Masuo Ikeda, painter
- Kenji Imai, architect
- Eiichiro Ishida, cultural anthropologist
- Toyo Ito, architect
- Bishin Jumonji, photographer
- Kazuo Kawasaki, industrial designer
- Matazo Kayama, Japanese painter
- Lee Ufan, painter and sculptor
- Kiyoshi Miki, philosopher
- Chihiro Minato, photographer and art theorist
- Hideki Noda, actor
- Togyu Okumura, Japanese painter
- Kenjiro Sano, graphic designer
- Timon Screech, historian of Japanese art
- Kazuyo Sejima, architect
- Nobuo Sekine, sculptor
- Keisuke Serizawa, textile designer
- Hisui Sugiura, graphic designer; a founders of Tama Teikoku Bijutsu Gakko (predecessor of Tama Art University) in 1935
- Isao Takahata, film director
- Saburo Teshigawara, choreographer
- Charles Tsunashima, furniture designer
- Tadanori Yokoo, graphic designer

== Notable alumni ==
=== Art and Design ===
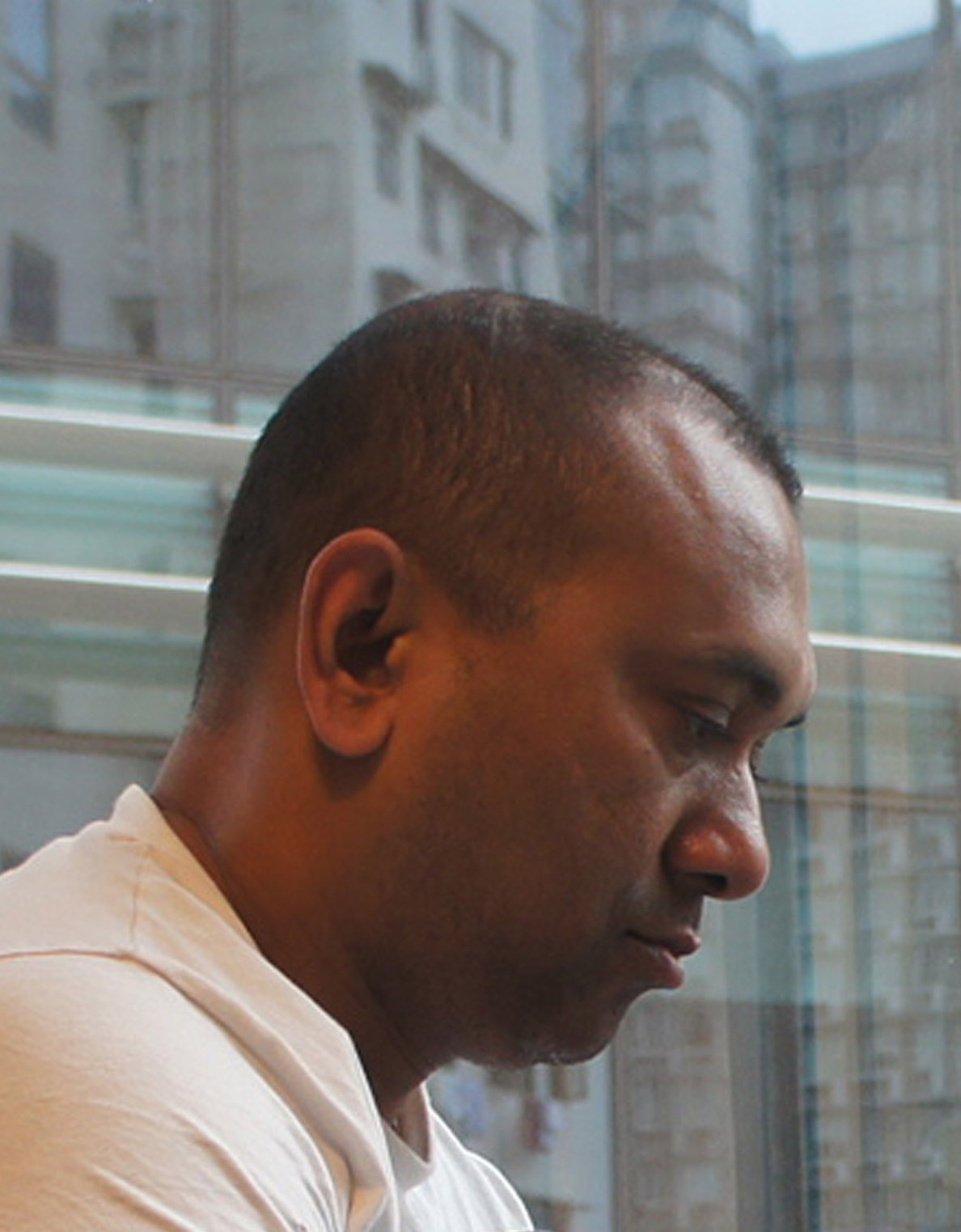
Firoz Mahmud, visual artist and educator

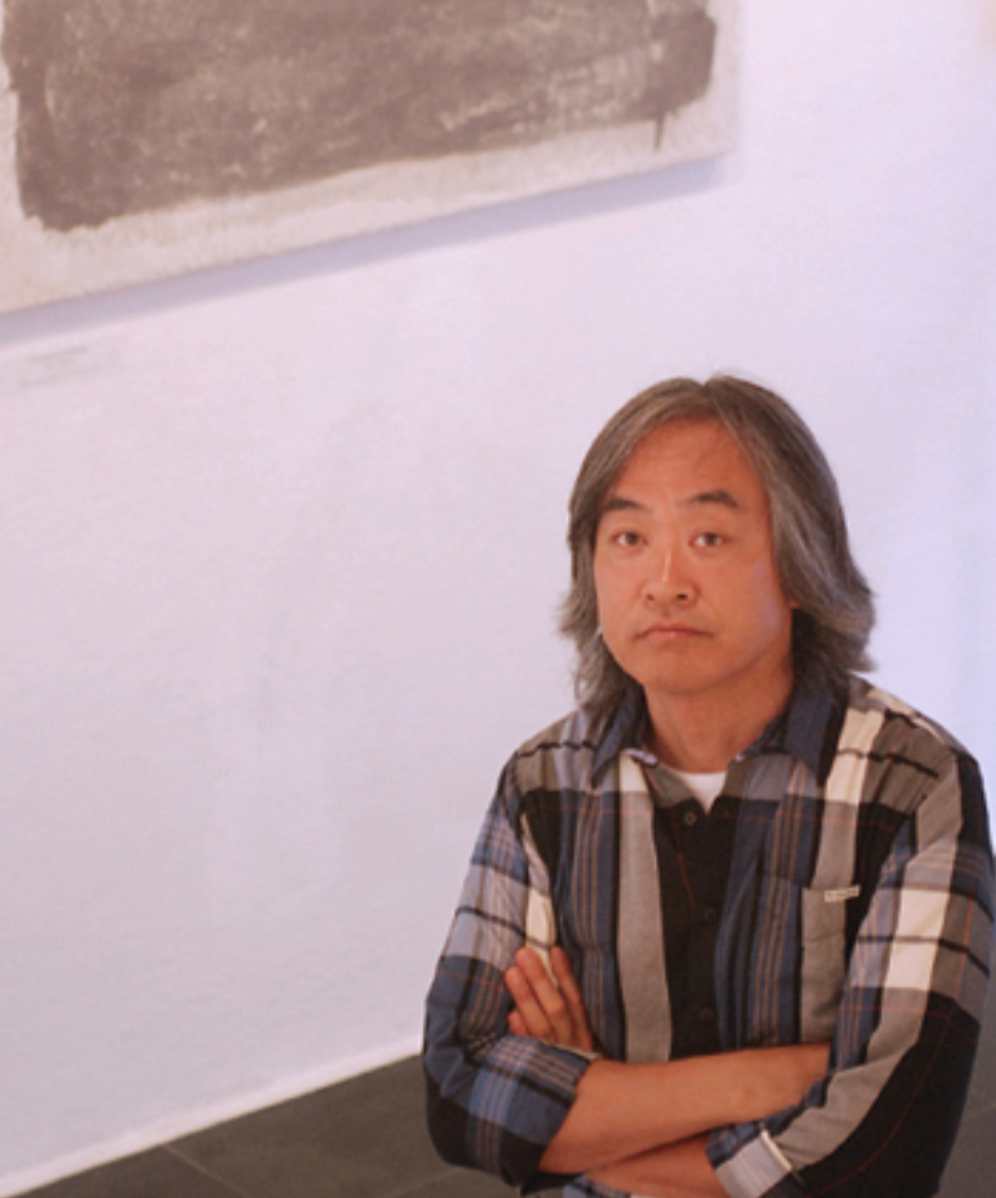
Takeshi Motomiya, painter and engraver

Graphic designers

- Kenjiro Sano
- Kashiwa Sato
- Makoto Wada

Fashion designers

- Issey Miyake

Industrial designers

- Naoto Fukasawa
- Masahiro Mori

Fine artists

- Firoz Mahmud _{(Bangladesh)}
- Susumu Koshimizu
- Erina Matsui
- Takeshi Motomiya
- Hiroko Okada
- Kenjiro Okazaki
- Kakiemon Sakaida
- Nobuo Sekine
- Kishio Suga
- Aya Takano
- Yuken Teruya
- Fantasista Utamaro

Photographers

- Akira Fujii
- Miyako Ishiuchi
- Ryuji Miyamoto
- Mika Ninagawa

=== Entertainment and communications ===
Directors/filmmakers

- Hibiki Yoshizaki
- Hiroyuki Imaishi
- Kunio Kato
- Kentaro Otani
- Yusuke Tanaka

Manga artists

- Usamaru Furuya
- Etsumi Haruki
- Daisuke Igarashi
- Yoshiyuki Nishi
- Saori Oguri
- Mari Okazaki
- Naoki Saito
- Tamakichi Sakura
- Hiroaki Samura
- Kotobuki Shiriagari
- Gengoroh Tagame
- Benkyo Tamaoki
- Kei Toume
- Hajime Ueda
- Reiji Yamada
- Makoto Yukimura

Actors

- Shintaro Asanuma
- Masaki Kyomoto
- Showtaro Morikubo
- Kōichi Satō
- Naoto Takenaka
- Touta Tarumi

Comedians

- Jin Katagiri (Rahmens)
- Kentaro Kobayashi (Rahmens)

Musicians

- Hirohisa Horie
- Yumi Matsutoya
- Shintaro Sakamoto (Yura Yura Teikoku)
- Emi Sugiyama (Heartsdales)
- Nemu Yumemi (Dempagumi.inc)
- Ei Wada (Open Reel Ensemble)

== Cooperation with other institutions in Japan ==
=== ARTSAT Project ===
- University of Tokyo

=== Tokyo 5 Art Universities Joint Graduation Exhibition ("Gobidai-ten" Exhibition) ===
- Joshibi University of Art and Design
- Musashino Art University
- Nihon University College of Art
- Tama Art University
- Tokyo Zokei University

=== Art Universities Liaison Council ===
- Joshibi University of Art and Design
- Musashino Art University
- Nihon University College of Art
- Tama Art University
- Tokyo University of the Arts
- Tokyo Zokei University

=== Comprehensive joint agreement ===
- Waseda University
- Showa University
- Tokyo City University

=== Credit transfer agreement (Consortium of Universities in Hachioji) ===
- Kyorin University
- Meisei University
- National Institute of Technology, Tokyo College
- Salesian Polytechnic
- Soka University
- Tokyo Junshin University
- Tokyo Kasei Gakuin University
- Tokyo University of Technology
- Tokyo Zokei University
- Yamano College of Aesthetics
- Yamazaki Gakuen University

== Regional collaborative projects ==
- Tama Rivers
- Sagamachi Consortium
- Hachioji Academic City University "Icho-juku"
- University/High School Collaboration Lectures
- Community gallery "Tamabiba"
- Art Laboratory Hashimoto

== Art events/exhibitions ==
- Tokyo International Mini-Print Triennial
- TAMAVIVANT
- CPUE : Curatorial Practice in the Urban Environment
- Tokyo Art Flow

== Alumni association ==
- The Alumni Association of Tama Art University

== Publications ==
- TAMABI NEWS
- tonATELIER
- tamabi.tv
  OpenCourseWare
- R

== See also ==
- INVADER
- Mono-ha
- 2020 Summer Olympics
