= Rahmens =

Japanese comedy duo

- ラーメンズ
- Education: Tama Art University

Comedy career
- Years active: 1996-2009
- Genre: Owarai
- Members: Jin Katagiri; Kentarō Kobayashi
- Website: www.rahmens.net

Notes
- Same year/generation as: Drunk Dragon; Shinagawa Shoji

Rahmens (ラーメンズ, Rāmenzu) is a Japanese comedy duo, referred to as an owarai kombi, consisting of Jin Katagiri (片桐 仁) and Kentarō Kobayashi (小林 賢太郎).

== Formation ==
Katagiri and Kobayashi met as students and formed a conte group in 1996 while studying printmaking at Tama Art University in Tokyo. They became popular on a national scale after appearing on the NHK show On Air Battle in 1999. Thereafter, Rahmens generally appeared for live performances on stage rather than on televised programs. Kobayashi reported that he personally was motivated more toward stage performance because the idea of being a TV celebrity was unappealing, and did not want people coming to see him simply because of his TV presence. Of the pair, Kobayashi is generally responsible for scriptwriting and stage direction behind the group's performances.

Their last live performance was in June 2009 during their "TOWER" tour.

== Notable performances ==
Promotional image of Rahmens with Jin Katagiri (left) and Kentaro Kobayashi (right)

Rahmens appeared in a regional "Get a Mac" ad campaign produced by Apple Japan, where Katagiri portrays the PC, and Kobayashi portrays the Mac. These advertisements were similar in some respects to content in ads featuring John Hodgman and Justin Long, but some noted subtle differences in the duo's body language and tone from other "Get a Mac" commercials that were intentionally done for the sake of appealing to a Japanese audience, where ads that directly compare brands are generally not well received.

Rahmens was also featured in a series of short films called "The Japanese Tradition." The films were directed by Junji Kojima with screenplay done by Kobayashi. These films were comedic explanations of customs related to various topics such as sushi and apologizing.

== Performances ==
- First performance, "Hakoshiki [Box Type]" in 1998
- Second performance, "Hakoshiki Dainisyu [Second Box Type]" in 1998
- Third performance, "Hakoyo Saraba. [Goodbye Box Type]" in 1999
- Fourth performance, "Kanzen Rippoutai~PERFECT CUBE~ [Perfect Cube]" in 1999
- Fifth performance, "home" in 2000
- Sixth performance, "FLAT" in 2000
- Seventh performance, "news" in 2001
- Eighth performance, "Tsubaki [Camellia]" in 2001
- Ninth performance, "Kujira [Whale]" in 2001
- Special performance, "Zero no Hakoshiki [Box Type of Zero]" in 2001
- Tenth performance, "Suzume [Sparrow]" in 2002
- Very special performance, "RMS1" in 2002
- Eleventh performance, "CHERRY BLOSSOM FRONT 345" in 2002
- Twelfth performance, "ATOM" in 2003
- Thirteenth performance, "CLASSIC" in 2005
- Fourteenth performance, "STUDY" in 2005
- Fifteenth performance, "Arisu [Alice]" in 2007
- "RAHEMENS PRESENTS 'GOLDEN BALLS LIVE'" in 2007
- Sixteenth performance, "TEXT" in 2007

Throughout all the performances, Kobayashi wrote and directed the script. For each performance, they performed six to ten skits for about an hour and a half. Their skits are considered to be positioned in between comedy and theater, different from being completely comedy or completely theater. The characteristics of their skits include repeating words with the same sound but different meanings, each focusing on sound or meaning, making use of the audience's understanding of the setting of the skit, and changing individual characters and their way of performing. Their skits are made up of various elements, which create synergies.
