= Junko Kayashige =

Japanese activist, art teacher, and artist

- Born: March 20, 1939 (age 87); Yokogawa, Hiroshima, Japan
- Occupations: Artist, art teacher, activist, hibakusha

Junko Kayashige (born 1939) is a Japanese artist, art teacher, activist, and hibakusha. She is a survivor of the bombing of Hiroshima. She is best known for her anti-war activism, having given talks around the world.

== Biography ==
She was born on March 20, 1939 in Yokogawa Town in Hiroshima. She had seven sisters and a brother. She has stated that she had pneumonia as a child. Her family ran a needle factory. On August 6, 1945, she was visiting the house of her uncle. After an air raid, she came out of shelter with her cousin to watch the planes leave. She hung clothes and listened to music. Then the atomic bomb landed in Hiroshima.

After the bomb, she found herself surrounded by fire, and eventually made it to a river. Much of her family was reunited, but one of her sisters was never found and another was exposed to the blast. Kayashige had to remove the maggots from that sister's wounds herself along with her family, due to a lack of available medical care. Kayashige has since stated her keloids remind her of her sister every time she observes them. Kayashige herself suffered severe burns on her right arm, face, and neck, and as of 2005, the burns were still severe enough that she avoided wearing low-collared dresses. She faced discrimination from others around her due to being a hibakusha. She has had two strokes and Thyroid failure.

She went to the Joshibi University of Art and Design and became an art teacher at the Hiroshima City Junior High School. Nine years after becoming a teacher, she assigned her students a project to write about the experiences of their families during the bombing, and Kayashige ultimately wrote about her experiences herself. Subsequently, she became an activist against war. She worked as an art teacher for 38 years.

She also made artwork inspired by the events of that day. In 2011, her work was first shown in the United States at the Harvard Graduate School of Education's Monroe C. Gutman Library. One notable piece from that collection was Faces II, inspired by envisioning what the pilots of the Enola Gay witnessed when dropping the atomic bomb.

She has called for an end to war and for the nuclear non-proliferation treaty to be applied. She has also called for universities to stop working with the Department of Energy on nuclear work.
