= Migishi Kōtarō =

Japanese painter (1903–1934)

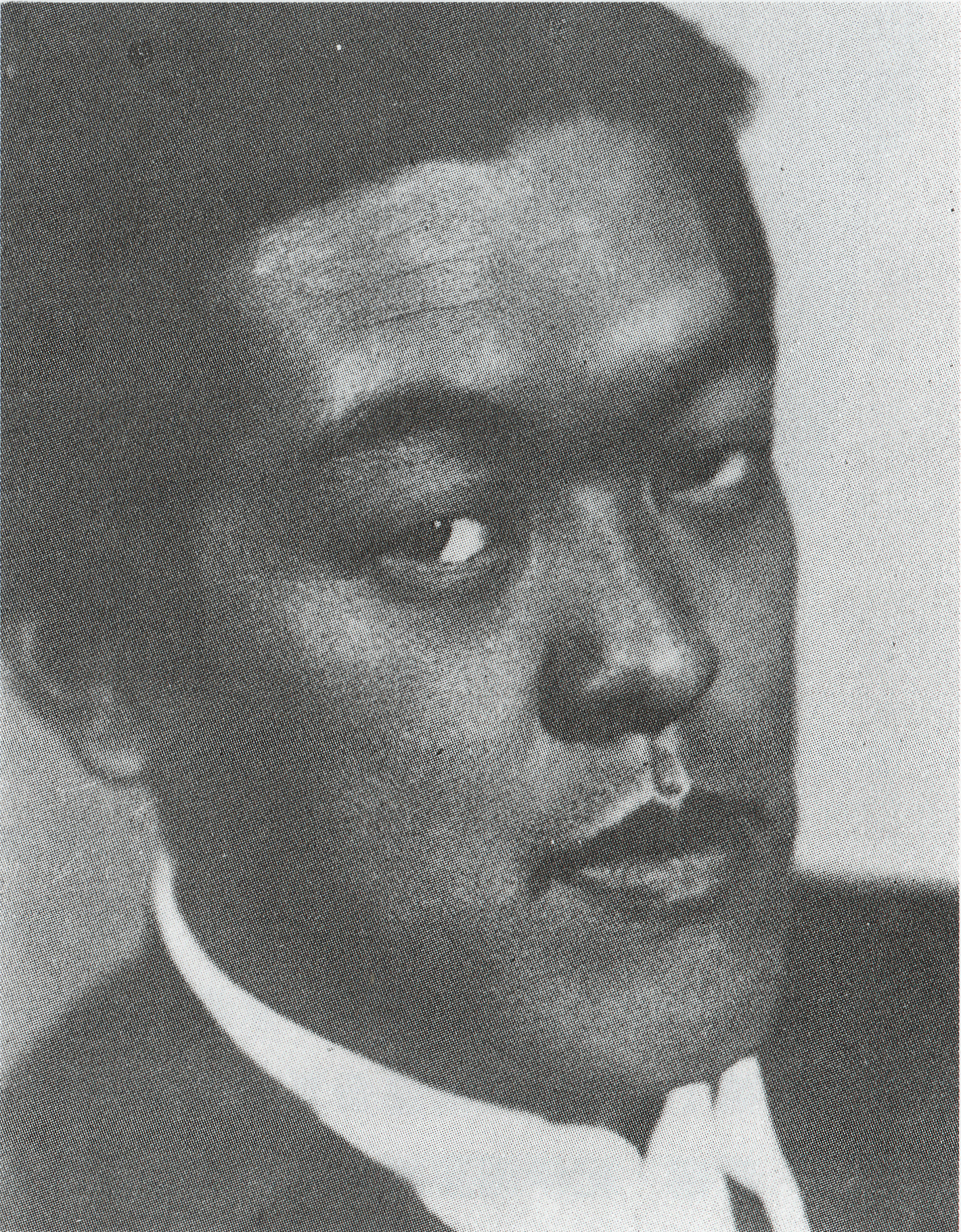
- Migishi Kōtarō (1933)
- Born: April 18, 1903; Sapporo, Japan
- Died: July 1, 1934 (aged 31); Nagoya, Aichi, Japan
- Known for: Painting
- Spouse: Migishi Setsuko (m. 1924–1934)
- Family: Takeshi Motomiya (Grandson)
- Website: Migishi Kotaro Museum of Art

Migishi Kōtarō (Japanese:三岸 好太郎; 18 April 1903, Sapporo - 1 July 1934, Nagoya) was a Japanese painter in the yōga style.

== Life and work ==
While attending the middle schools in Sapporo, he became interested in oil painting and took lessons from Hayashi Takejirō, who worked for the local school system. When he completed his primary studies in 1920, he went to Tokyo, where he saw paintings by Cézanne and Van Gogh at an exhibition sponsored by the Shirakaba-ha, a prominent literary association.

In 1921, he was able to show some paintings at the third "Central Art Exhibition" (中央美術展). Two years later, he had his second showing, with the Shun’yō-kai (Spring Meeting), a group devoted to promoting Western-style art. The following year, he exhibited there again and was awarded First Prize. Soon after he, Yokobori Kakujirō (1897–1978), a friend from the Shun’yō-kai, and others put together their own exhibition.

Later that year, he married the painter, Yoshida Setsuko. In 1928 he, his wife and a friend, Chōkai Seiji, organized their own exhibition. The following year, he became one of the founding members of the Independent Art Association. He would exhibit with them annually for the remainder of his life.

After 1932, he was increasingly influenced by modern French art; showing some of his works at an avant-garde exhibition in Paris, as well as at the Progressive Art Alliance in Tokyo. He combined ideas from Abstract Expressionism with Fauvism, then switched to Surrealism. In 1934 he published, at his own expense, a long narrative poem called "Butterflies and Shells" (蝶と貝殻), with illustrations.

That same year, while travelling in Nagoya, he died unexpectedly, from a bleeding stomach ulcer. His home prefecture dedicated his estate to establishing a museum in Sapporo, called the "Migishi Kōtarō Museum of Art, Hokkaido.

== Selected paintings ==
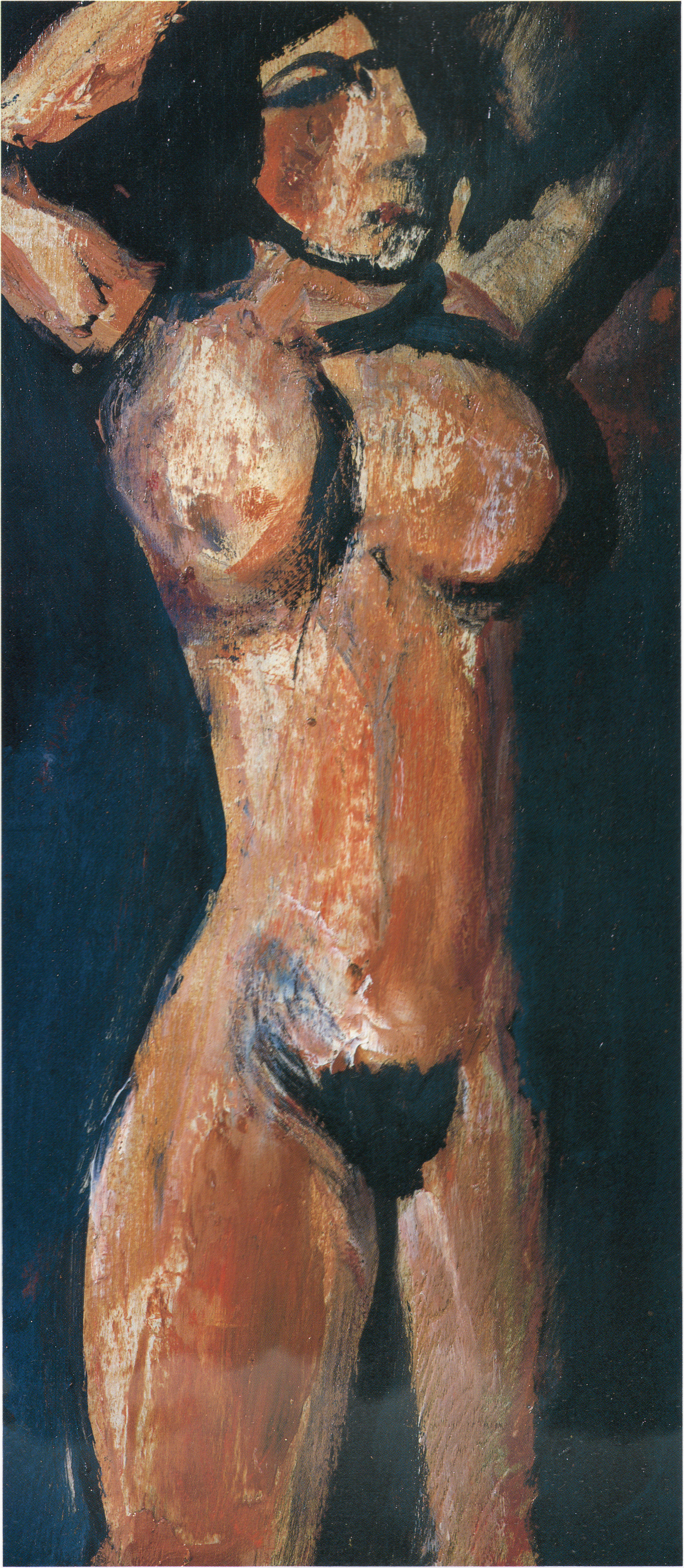
Nude-Standing Posture

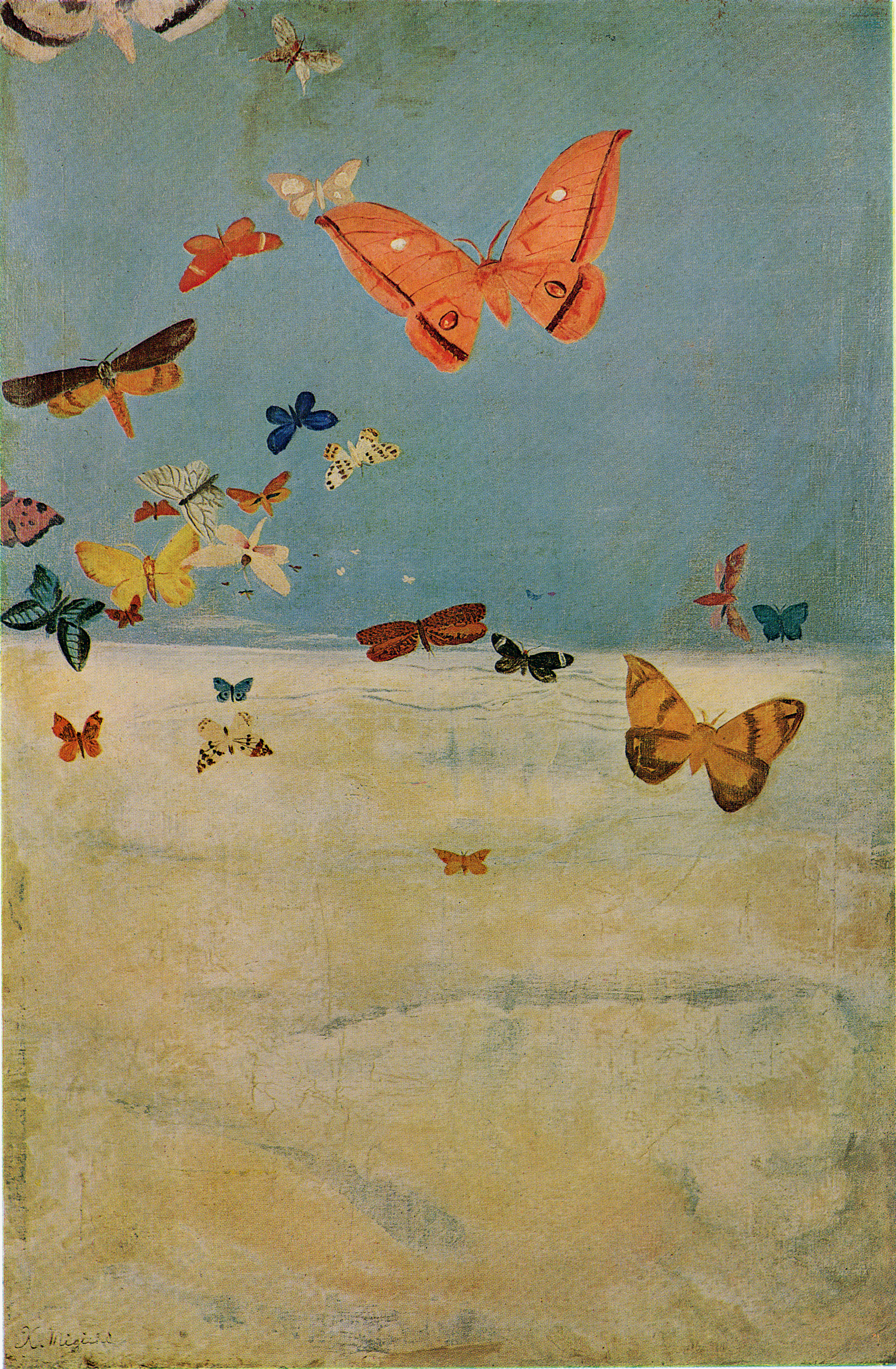
Butterflies Above the Clouds

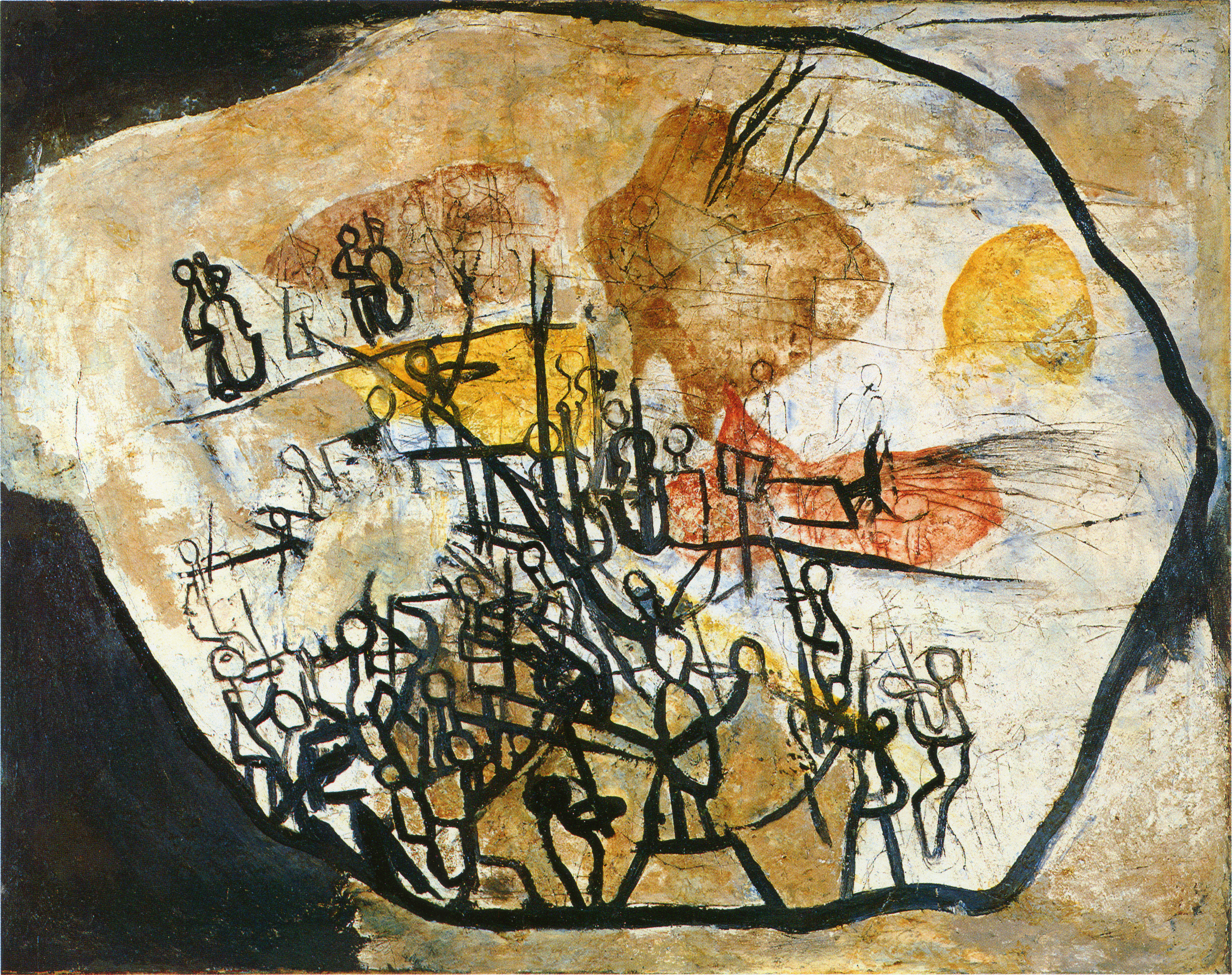
Orchestra

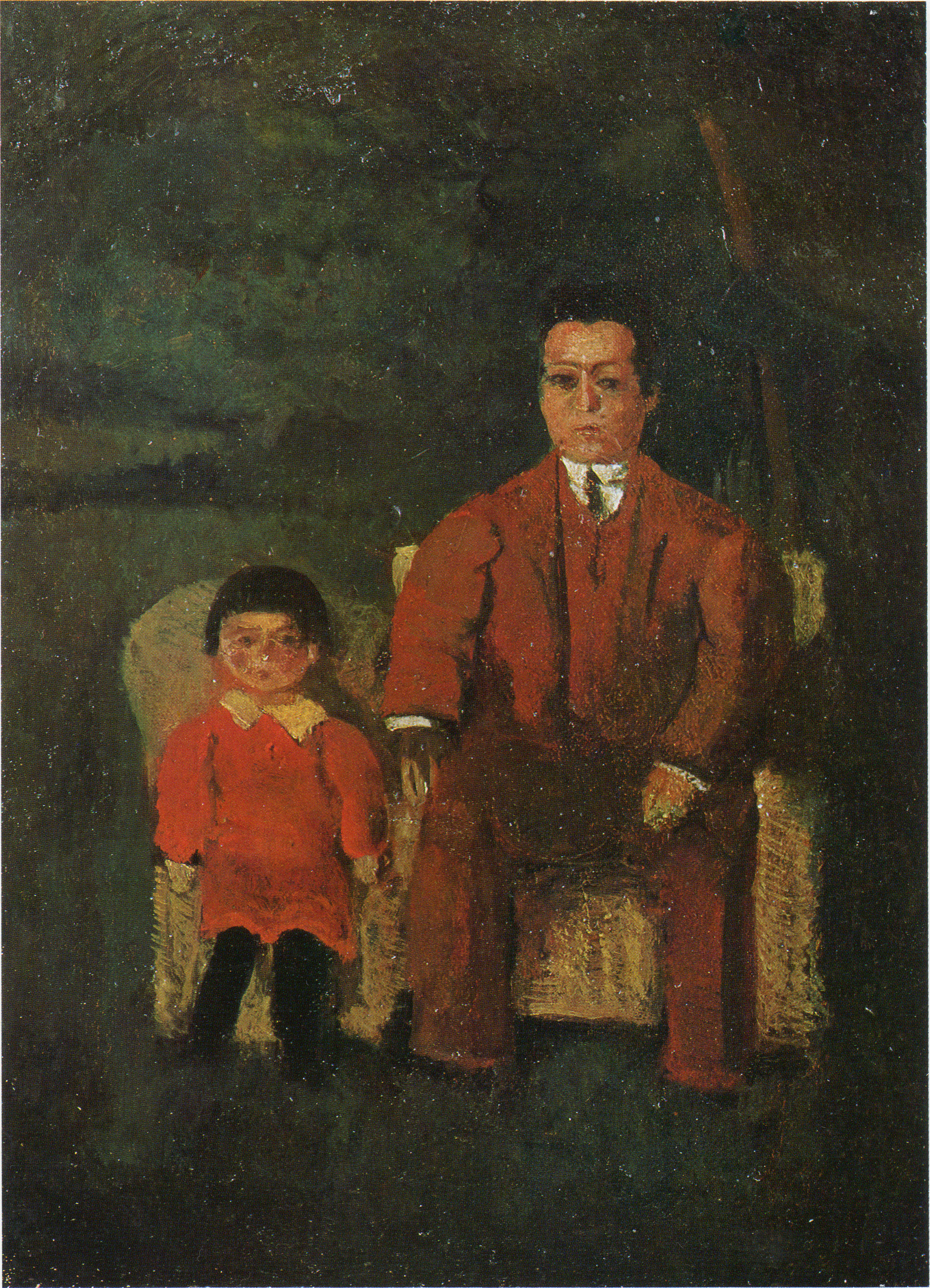
Elder Brother and Eldest Daughter

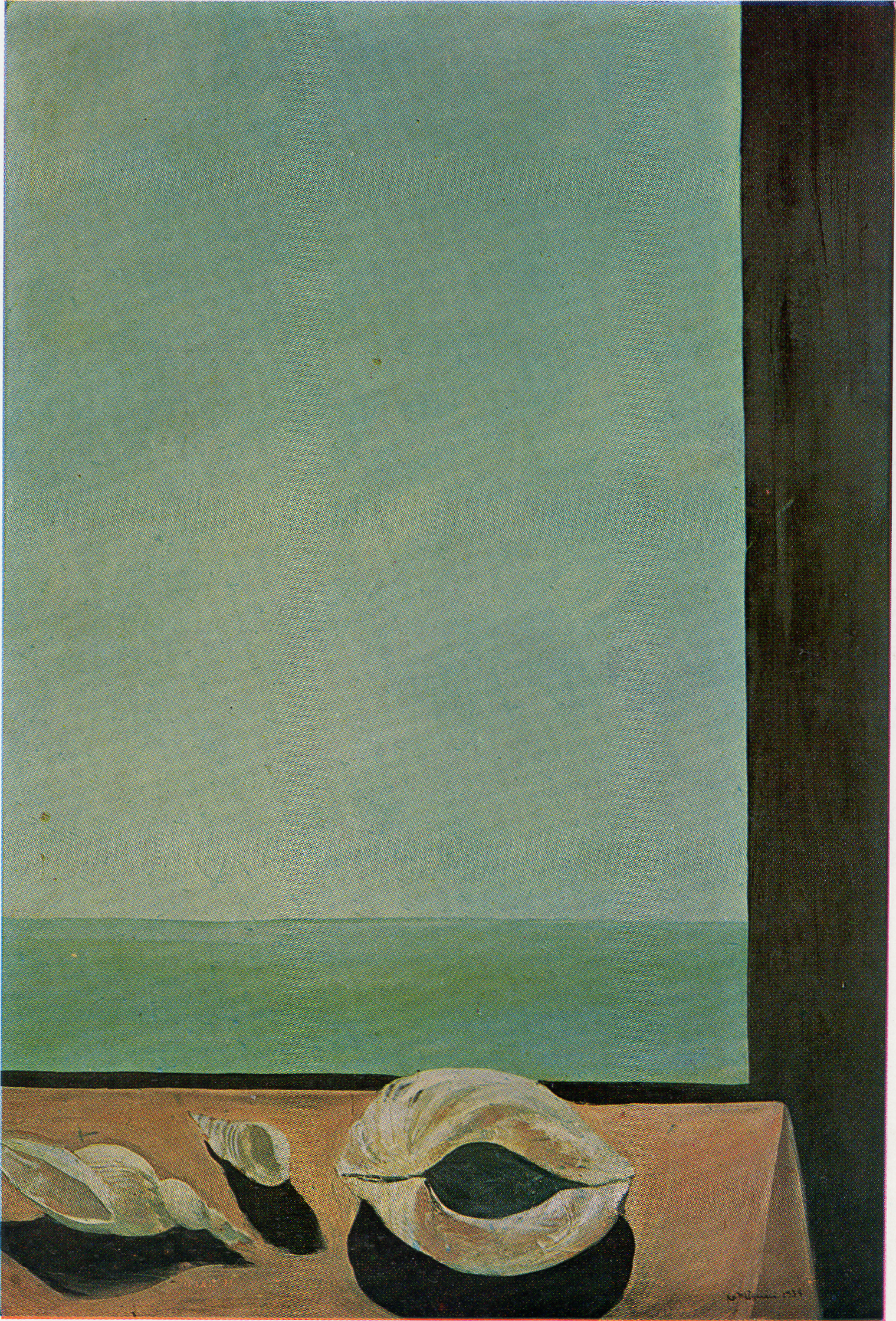
Loneliness on a Journey

A Cat

== Sources ==
- Japan Foundation: "Migishi". In: Japanische Malerei im westlichen Stil (exhibition catalog), Museum für Ostasiatische Kunst, Cologne, 1985
- Tazawa, Yutaka: "Migishi Kōtarō". In: Biographical Dictionary of Japanese Art. Kodansha International, 1981. ISBN 0-87011-488-3.
