= Chihiro Minato =

Japanese photographer and arts curator

Chihiro Minato (港 千尋, Minato Chihiro; born 1960) is a Japanese photographer, filmmaker, arts curator and art theorist. He is also Professor at the Tama Art University since 1995.

In 2000, Minato served as curator of the arts exhibition Serendipity: Photography, Video, Experimental Film and Multimedia Installation from Asia. Among his other major curatorial works is the Japanese Pavilion at the Venezia Biennale (Venice, Italy) in 2007.

== Bibliography ==
- Nihon shashinka jiten (日本写真家事典) / 328 Outstanding Japanese Photographers. Kyoto: Tankōsha, 2000. ISBN 4-473-01750-8. (in Japanese) Despite the English-language alternative title, all in Japanese.
- « Chihiro Minato: Only Once », art press, number 353, 2009
