= Migishi Setsuko =

Japanese Yōga painter (1905-1999)

- 三岸節子
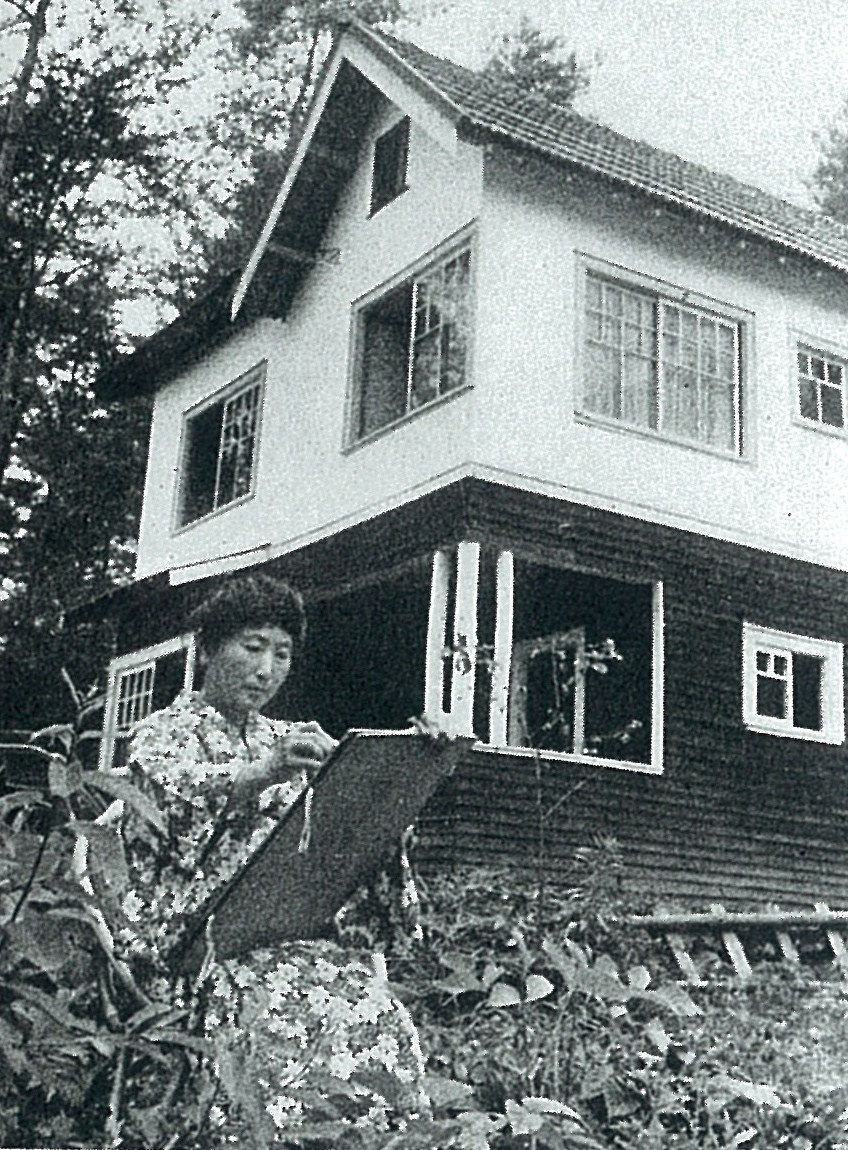
- Setsuko Migishi, 1960
- Born: Yoshida Setsuko; 3 January 1905; Ichinomiya, Japan
- Died: April 18, 1999 (aged 94); Ōiso
- Education: Joshibi University of Art and Design
- Known for: Painting and Illustration
- Style: Yōga
- Movement: Fauvism
- Spouse(s): Migishi Kōtarō, (三岸 好太郎)
- Family: Takeshi Motomiya, (Grandson)
- Awards: Minister of Education Outstanding Art Prize (1951); 4th Jin Hasegawa Memorial Prize (1980); Order of the Precious Crown (1986); Asahi Prize (1989); Person of Cultural Merit (1994)
- Website: s-migishi.com

Migishi Setsuko (三岸節子, January 3, 1905 – April 18, 1999) was a Japanese yōga (Western-style) painter. Known for employing vivid colors and bold strokes for still-life and landscape, Migishi contributed greatly to the establishment and elevation of the status of female artists in the Japanese art scene.

== Early years ==
Born Setsuko Yoshida in Nakashima-gun (later Oniishi, now Ichinomiya), Aichi Prefecture, into a wealthy family who built a textile factory in Owari, she was the sixth of ten children. Her birth family was a wealthy landowner who ran a woolen cloth manufacturing business. Due to a congenital dislocation of the hip joint, Migishi had a major operation during her infant times at a hospital in Nagoya. After attending Koshin Nakajima Elementary School, she enrolled in Kihatsu Elementary School in 1915 and graduated from the school in 1917. She entered Shukutoku High School for Girls in Nagoya. While at school, her roommate at the school's dorm, Suzu Toda, senior to her, who practiced Nihonga (Japanese-style painting), inspired Migishi to copy the paintings of beautiful women by such female artists as Uemura Shoen and Shima Seien.

== Pre-War: 1920s-1945 ==
In 1921, she graduated from the school and moved to Tokyo, where she first took the entrance exam for the Women's Medical College, but failed. Migishi began to study painting, entered the Hongō Western-style Painting Institute (本郷洋画研究所), and became a student under Saburōsuke Okada. One year later, Migishi transferred as a second-year student to the Women’s Art School/Joshibi University of Art and Design, a private women's art school in Suginami, Japan, and graduated top-class in 1924. In 1923, Migishi submitted her work to the Nika Exhibition (二科展) but was not accepted. During the same year of her graduation, she married Kōtarō Migishi, a Japanese oil painter, who died unexpectedly later in 1934.

Migishi gave birth to their first daughter in March 1925. In the same month, her works Jigazō (自画像, Self-Portrait), Fūkei (風景, Landscape), Sazanka (山茶花, Camellia), and Kijō nika (机上二果, Two Fruits on a Table) were accepted to the 3rd Shunyō-kai Exhibition (春陽会展). From there, she continued to exhibit works at the Shunyō-kai Exhibition. In April of the same year, Migishi, together with Hitoyo Kai and Koko Fukazawa, formed the Women's Yōga Association (婦人洋画協会).

In 1932, she moved from the Shunyō-kai to the Dokuritsu (Independent) Art Association (独立美術協会), and exhibited Hana Kajitsu (花·果実, Flowers and Fruits), Ragā (ラガー, Lager) at its second exhibition. After Kōtarō's death in 1934 at the age of 31, Migishi continued to work while raising three children. In 1935 at the Independent's 5th exhibition, Migishi’s Momoiro no nuno (桃色の布, Pink Cloth), Mado (窓, Window), Kurenai no nuno (紅の布, Crimson Cloth) were accepted and the artist became a friend (会友) of the Association. However, in four years, Migishi would quit from Dokuritsu in protest of the association's decision not to admit female painters as members. In January 1936, seven female painters, Haruko Hasegawa, Yoneko Saeki, Eiko Fujikawa, Aoi Shima, Yōko Toyama, Setsuko Migishi, and Hanako Hashimoto, organized a new organization, Nanasai-kai (七彩会), one of the first woman artist collectives in Japan. Migishi also turned to the Shin Seisaku-ha Kyōkai (新制作派協会, New Production Association) and became a member in the same year. Also in 1939, Migishi became a teacher at the Bijutsu Kōgei Gakuin (美術工芸学院, Academy of Arts and Crafts), a school established to provide artistic education for women.

In 1940, Migishi visited Korea and Japan-occupied Manchuria. She exhibited her painting Shitsunai (室内, The Interior) at the exhibition celebrating the 2600th anniversary of the Empire of Japan (紀元2600年奉祝展). In 1943, the artist became an officer of the Joryū Bijutsuka Hōkō-tai (女流美術家奉公隊, Women’s Art Service Corps).

== Post-War ==
In September 1945, the first post-war solo exhibition of Setsuko Migishi was held at Nichid Gallery in Ginza, Tokyo. In 1946, with the goal of elevating the status of female artists and independent creators, she founded the Joryū Gaka Kyōkai (女流画家協会, Women Artists Association) with Eiko Fujikawa and Yuki Katsura and began to exhibit her works here in addition to the New Production Association. In 1950, Kingyo (金魚, Goldfish) was accepted in the 14th New Production Association Exhibition and was purchased by the Ministry of Education. Another painting, Kuchinashi (梔子, Gardenia) received the Selected Artworks by the Ministry of Education Award (芸術選奨文部大臣賞). Flowers were a motif that Migishi continued to engage with throughout her career. She would experiment with drawing flowers abstractly or using vibrant colors to express the dynamics of botany. The artist often set up a garden in her studios both in Japan and later in Europe, cared for the flowers that later she would draw from.

In 1951, she exhibited Hana (花, Flower) at the 1st São Paulo Biennial. The following year, Migishi’s activities as an artist continued to expand internationally, as she exhibited at the Salon de Mai in Paris and the 18th Carnegie International Art Exhibition in Pittsburgh. In 1953, she broke off her five-year long relationship to Keisuke Sugano, an oil painter.

In 1954, Migishi travelled to Europe for the first time to visit her eldest son, Kōtarō. After staying in Burgundy, France and touring Spain and Italy, she returned to Japan in the summer of 1955. The artist absorbed the culture that surrounded Western painting and was much inspired by the relationship among the dry climate in Europe, its landscape, and colors.

In the 1950s and 1960s, she continued to participate in the exhibitions of New Production Association and the Women Artists Association, as well as the Contemporary Art Exhibition of Japan (現代日本美術展) and the Japan International Art Exhibition (日本国際美術展). In 1964, she set up a studio on the hills of Ōiso, Kanagawa, and the landscape there, as supposed to mostly still-life that she worked on prior to this, became the motif that Migishi frequently engaged with. In 1965, Migishi traveled to Hokkaido. In addition to painting the scenery there, she decided to donate the works of her late husband Kōtarō to somewhere in Hokkaido. Two years later, 216 works by Kōtarō Migishi were donated and became the founding collection of Hokkaido Museum of Modern Art (now Hokkaido Prefectural Migishi Kotaro Museum).

The following year, in 1968, the artist left Japan and settled in Carnille, France, where she devoted herself to production. In 1969, Migishi, with Tamako Kataoka, Fukuko Okubo and other nine members held the Joryū Sōgō-ten (女流総合展, Women’s General Exhibition).

Migishi moved to Véron, Burgundy in 1974 before returning to Japan in 1989. She continued her work at her home and studio in Ōiso, Kanagawa Prefecture. In the same year, she was awarded the Asahi Prize. In 1994, Migishi received the Person of Cultural Merit, an official Japanese recognition and honor to selected people who have made outstanding cultural contributions.

Migishi died in 1999 at the age of 94 due to acute circulatory failure.

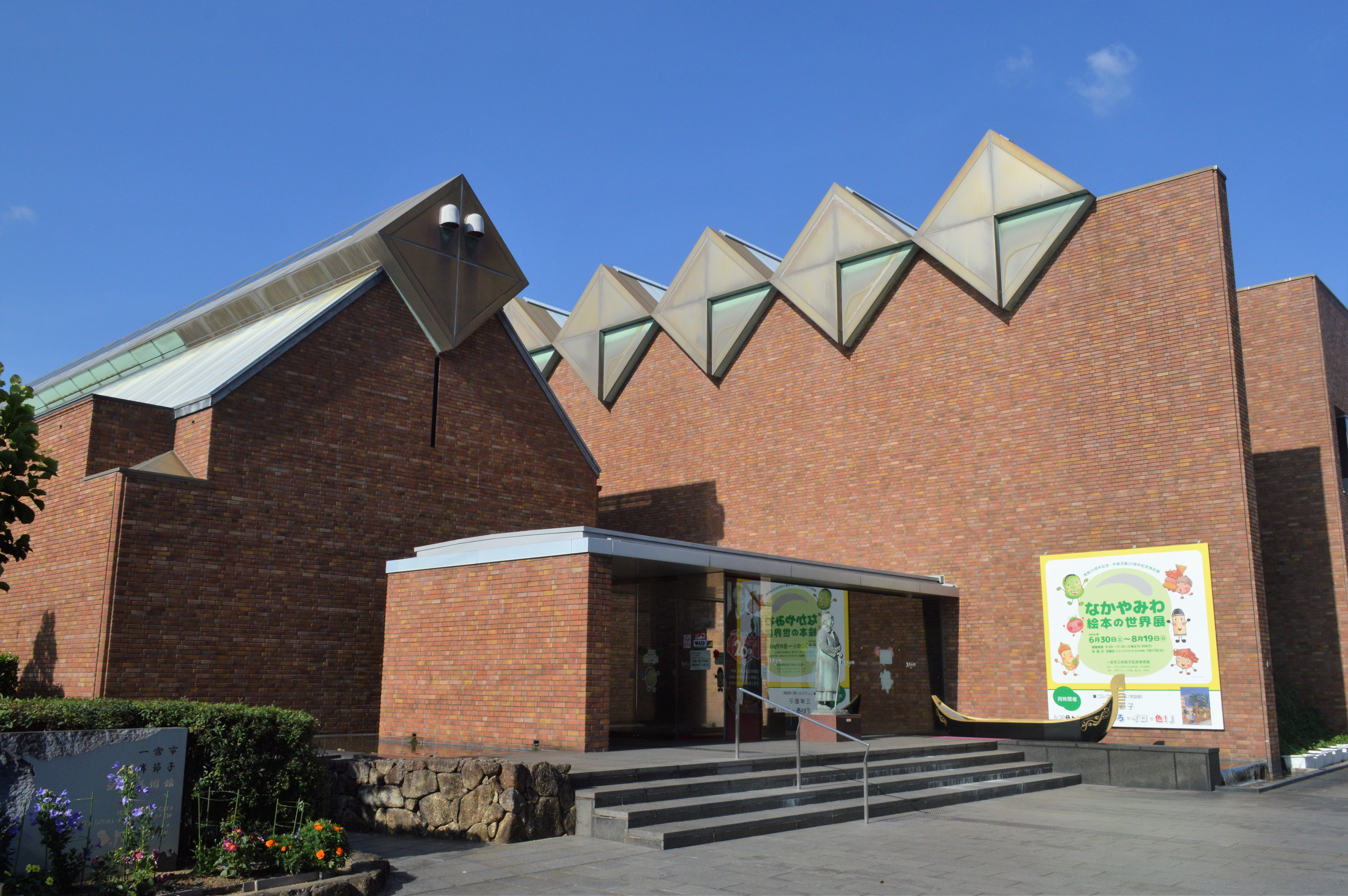
The Ichinomiya City Memorial Art Museum of Setsuko Migishi in Japan

== Writing ==
Migishi was also a writer. In 1950, Migishi published a collection of essays entitled Bijin no Tsubasa (美神の翼, Wings of the Goddess of Beauty). Her other books include Hana to Venice (花とヴェネチア―三岸節子, Flower and Venice), published by Sansaisha in 1977 and Hana yori naha rashiku (花より花らしく, More Flowerly Than a Flower), published by Kyuryudō in 1977.

== Legacy ==
The Ichinomiya City Memorial Art Museum of Setsuko Migishi is a museum and cultural center located in Ichinomiya, Aichi Prefecture, in Japan, that is dedicated to the works and life of Migishi Setsuko. It was established in 1998 at the birthplace of the Japanese Yōga painter. The museum owns one of the most extensive collections of Setsuko's work, mostly donated by Setsuko and her family themselves. It includes a permanent collection of works, temporary exhibitions and art related lectures, as well as different activities and showings of Setsuko's documentaries. It also contains a library and gift shop dedicated to the artist, along with books and catalogues about Japanese art and culture.

From April 2, 1991 to May 19, 1992, the National Museum of Women in the Arts displayed Setsuko Migishi: A Retrospective featuring her abstract landscapes and still lives.
