= Joshibi High School of Art and Design =

Coordinates: 35°41′38″N 139°39′46″E

- 女子美術大学付属高等学校・中学校

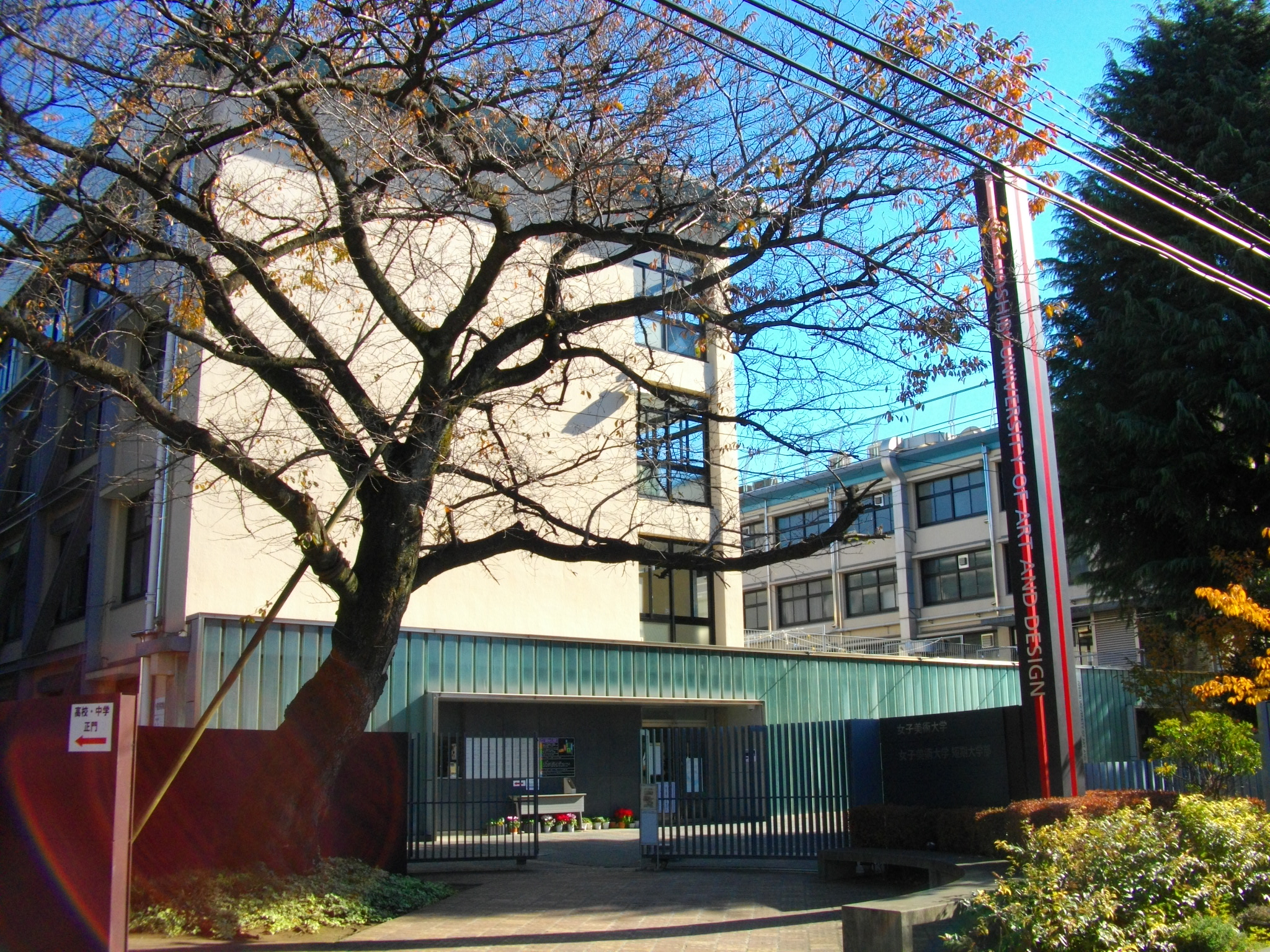
- 1-49-8 Wada, Suginami-ku, Tokyo; Japan

Information
- Type: Private
- Established: 1915
- Enrollment: 1050(May 1, 2016)
- Color: Navy
- Affiliation: Joshibi University of Art and Design; Joshibi University of Art and Design Junior College
- Gender: Girls
- Website: Joshibi High School of Art and Design

Joshibi High School of Art and Design (女子美術大学付属高等学校・中学校, Joshibijutsu Daigaku Fuzoku Kōtōgakkō Chūgakkō) abbreviated Joshibi (女子美), is a private school for girls located in Tokyo, Japan.

Joshibi especially emphasizes fine arts and design studies. Joshibi graduates are actively involved in various field in and out of Japan, as artists, designers, and creative artists.

== History ==
Joshibi High School of Art and Design was established in 1915 as an affiliated school with Joshibi University of Art and Design. Bunzo Fujita (former Professor of Tokyo University of the Arts) was appointed as the first school principal. Joshibi High School of Art and Design was renamed "Sato Girls' High School" in 1916 due to financial subsidies by Sato's family. The school name backed to the original name of "Joshibi High School of Art and Design" in 1951.

The school was founded at Hongō-ku (currently Bunkyō, Tokyo), later moved to Wada, Suginami in 1945 due to a fire caused by the Bombing of Tokyo. Joshibi High School building was completed and newly built with three-story high and second basement floor structure in January 2010.

Johshibi High School of Art and Design celebrated its centennial anniversary in 2015. The 100th anniversary art exhibition was organized at the Ueno Royal Museum between May 17 and 24, 2015.

== School life ==
Joshibi students will study fine arts and design improving their skills in sketching, painting, Graphic design, Spatial design, Computer graphics, sculpture, printing, pottery, and art history.

There are variety of school events organized throughout the years, include art exhibitions, painting Competitions, Public art/design competitions, painting trips, school trip, and athletic day.

An art festival held in October called Joshibisai (女子美祭)(or Bisai (美祭), is the largest school event for Joshibi students displaying art and design works, performing creative exhibition, sporting and cultural events.

== Notable alumnae ==
- Nagi Noda (Creator, Art Director)
- Yoshiko Mita (Actress)
- Jitsuko Yoshimura (Actress)
- Kaori Momoi (Actress)
- Narumi Yasuda (Actress)
- Mariko Kawana (Author, AV idol)
- Umeka Shōji (Voice Actress)
- Naoko Kume (Swimmer)

== See also ==
- List of high schools in Tokyo
- Joshibi University of Art and Design
