= Takeshi Motomiya =

Japanese artist (born 1959)

- 本宮健史
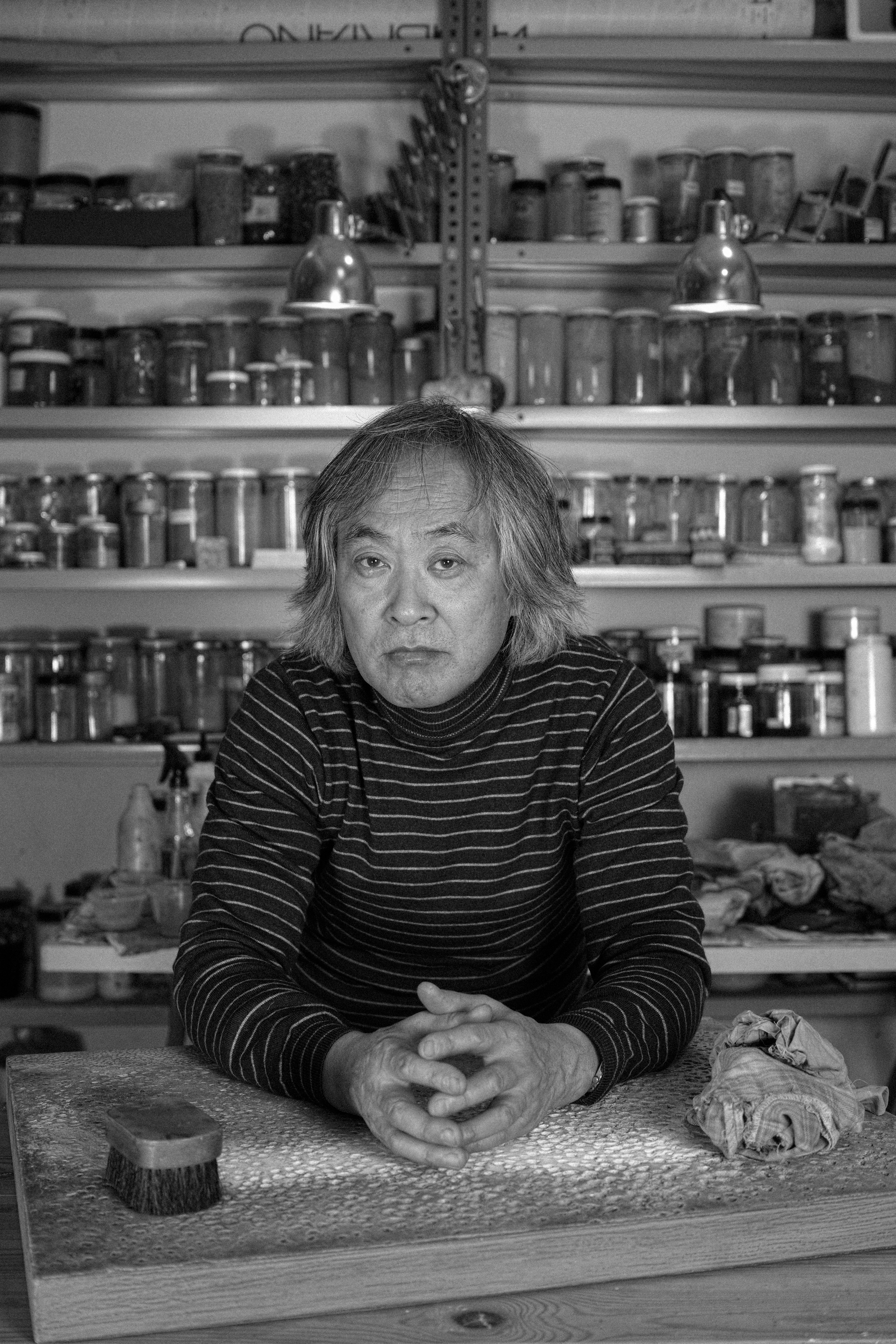
- Motomiya in 2021
- Born: 5 December 1959 (age 66); Shibuya, Tokyo, Japan
- Education: Tama Art University, Tokyo, Japan
- Occupation: Professional artist
- Years active: 1984–present
- Known for: Painting, engraving
- Style: Abstract art
- Relatives: Migishi Setsuko (grandmother); Migishi Kōtarō (grandfather)
- Website: takeshimotomiya.com

Takeshi Motomiya (Japanese: 本宮 健史 Motomiya Takeshi (Japanese pronunciation: [motomʲija takeɕi]), born 5 December 1959, Tokyo, Japan) is a multidisciplinary Japanese artist living in Barcelona since 1986. Throughout his career, he has worked within various visual arts disciplines that include painting, engraving, and sculpture. Characterized by his work of textures and natural pigment colors, his work is mainly based on abstract art and shows some attributes of figurativism and abstract expressionism, infused with ancient Japanese gods, biblical content, and Greek and Egyptian mythology.

Raised and trained in Japan, and having lived in Paris before settling in Barcelona, Motomiya's work has been exhibited in several European cities such as Barcelona, Paris, Amsterdam and Mahón (Minorca). However the vast majority of his works are exhibited in his native country, Japan.

Through his specialization in engraving and the subsequent creation of the Taller Nou studio, he has worked with national and international artists, such as Antoni Tàpies, Barry Flanagan, Balthus, Miquel Barceló and Perejaume. The studio has been acknowledged as one of the best printmaking studios in Spain.

== Early life and education ==
Takeshi Motomiya was born on 5 December 1959 in Shibuya, Tokyo. He was born into a highborn family of painters, and grew up surrounded by an artistic environment, between galleries and exhibitions. His grandmother, Migishi Setsuko (Japanese: 三岸 節子, 1905–1999), known as one of the pioneering Japanese women in oil painting, and his grandfather, Migishi Kōtarō (Japanese: 三岸 好太郎, 1903–1934), known as one of the first painters who began paintings by surrealism in Japan, were the main influential characters in Motomiya's interest towards the art world.

=== Tokyo, Japan ===
He graduated in Fine Arts in 1982, with a master's degree specializing in engraving techniques in 1984 by the Tama Art University of Tokyo. Despite the fact that his academic background was focused on engraving, his personal development as an artist has matured above all in the area of painting.

=== Paris, France ===
In 1984, with an invitation from his grandmother Setsuko who at the time was living in France, Motomiya undertook his first trip to Europe with the intention of getting to know the art of European museums. While residing in France, Motomiya travelled around Europe where he had the opportunity to exhibit alongside his grandparents, and his uncle in a joint exhibition at the Galerie d’Eendt in Amsterdam in 1986.

=== Barcelona, Spain ===
It was that same year, in one of his European trips where Motomiya, at the age of 27, fell in love with the city of Barcelona, where he has been established since 1986. It was upon his settlement in Barcelona that Motomiya began to focus entirely on his painting.

== Career ==
Motomiya's work has been exhibited mainly in art galleries in Tokyo such as the Ueda Gallery, the Galerie 421, the 21+yo, the Okumura Gallery or the Libre Gallery. He has shown his work in art galleries across Japan as well; at the Yamaguchi Gallery in Chiba, and the Ecru-no-mori Gallery in Mishima. He has participated in several editions of the Nippon International Contemporary Art Fair, currently known as Art Fair Tokyo, and has exhibited at various editions of the Japan Art Dealers Association in Tokyo.

Outside Japan, Motomiya's work has been mostly exhibited in Europe, in cities such as Barcelona, Paris, Amsterdam and Mahón (Minorca) where he has been regularly exhibiting since 2012.

"On my first meeting with Takeshi Motomiya, I instantly recognized, seeing his paintings and he, himself, before me, that he was the figure who appeared in them. [...] he is none other than an “artist painted by pictures.” He himself emerges out of the paintings he creates; there is no need for him to step out of the frame and proclaim his creed or explain the rationale behind his work. What people see when they look at his paintings is Takeshi Motomiya himself. It is enough for people to distinctly feel how this silent, reserved figure seems to be speaking loud and clear in the paintings."

— Makoto Ōoka, in Poets and Artists

During his first exhibition at the 5th NiCAF in 1997, Motomiya was introduced to the Japanese poet and literary critic, Makoto Ōoka (大岡 信, 1931–2017). After seeing Motomiya's work, Ōoka described him as the artist painted by pictures, which he later used as the title for the article in which he wrote about Motomiya's work. Ōoka who came to admire the artist's work, became a regular buyer of Motomiya's work. Today, some of those paintings are part of the private collection exhibited at the Ōoka Makoto Kotoba Museum, in Mishima, Shizuoka Prefecture.

In 2009, Motomiya began teaching printmaking techniques at the Escola Massana of Barcelona within the Experimental Edition Course of the Massana Permanent program. The course was taught until 2012.

== Work ==
Motomiya's work is known for his use of natural pigments that according to various processes the artist applies on wooden panels. At his studio in Barcelona, no tubes, no oils nor solvents but vivid shelves of colored jars. From black earth to marble powder, the whole range of shards - extracted from ashes, slag, ocher, minerals, iron oxides, walnut husks, tallow, or coal. Those are later milled and spread out, resulting in a crushed and abraded powder that impregnates the medium.

Despite the fact that most of his works are small in size, the titles of Motomiya's works carry deep meanings that lie behind each painting. Many layers of meaning change the significance of the works from that which was initially perceived with the naked eye. What some art critics, writing on Motomiya's work, have defined as "Seeing is knowing, an exercise of intelligence".

Motomiya generally draws from his readings (Bible, Dante, Goethe ...) clues for reflection; expressions, proverbs, myths. Words that give color to the idea. While the figure is mostly absent from his paintings, reduced to surreptitious appearances, Motomiya gives us mute objects to meditate over like those of the Grail procession. Ashes, deities, and engulfed peoples, influenced with vanished and metamorphosed worlds, reveal their traces, anthropomorphism becoming abstraction, geometry. The works of Motomiya try to reflect the feeling of things.

== Taller Nou studio ==
After establishing in Barcelona, in 1989, while pursuing his work in painting, he founded, in partnership with an associate, the Taller Nou studio, which became a printmaking studio specializing in etching and engraving techniques for professional artists.

From the beginning of their early days as engravers, and for more than twenty years, they were the only engraving studio for the work of Catalan artist Antoni Tàpies. In fact, they remained working with him until the artist's passing in 2012, creating over 500 works. Apart from Tàpies, they have worked with many other national and international artists, among which are Barry Flanagan, Balthus, Miquel Barceló and Perejaume.

Originally located in the Gracia district of Barcelona, the studio has been referred to as one of the best printmaking studios in Spain. Their work has been exhibited in museums around the world such as the Museum of Modern Art (MoMA) of New York, during the Antoni Tàpies in Print exhibition, or at the Musée Picasso Paris, during Miquel Barceló, Sol y Sombra exhibit in 2016 amongst others. In recent years, some works have also been featured in art auctions at major art houses such as Christie's and Bonhams.

== Selected works ==
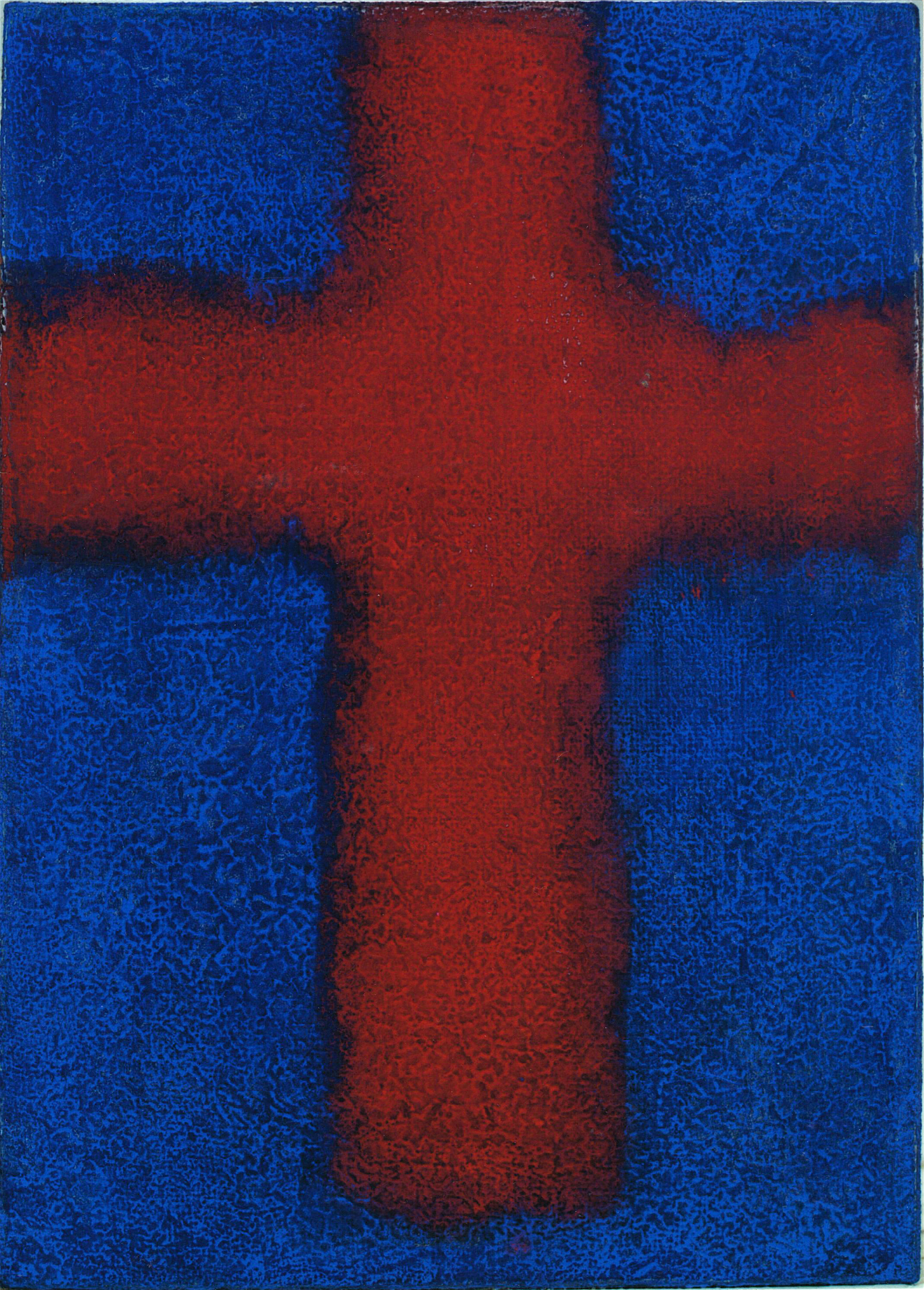
Forma de rezar (2004)*

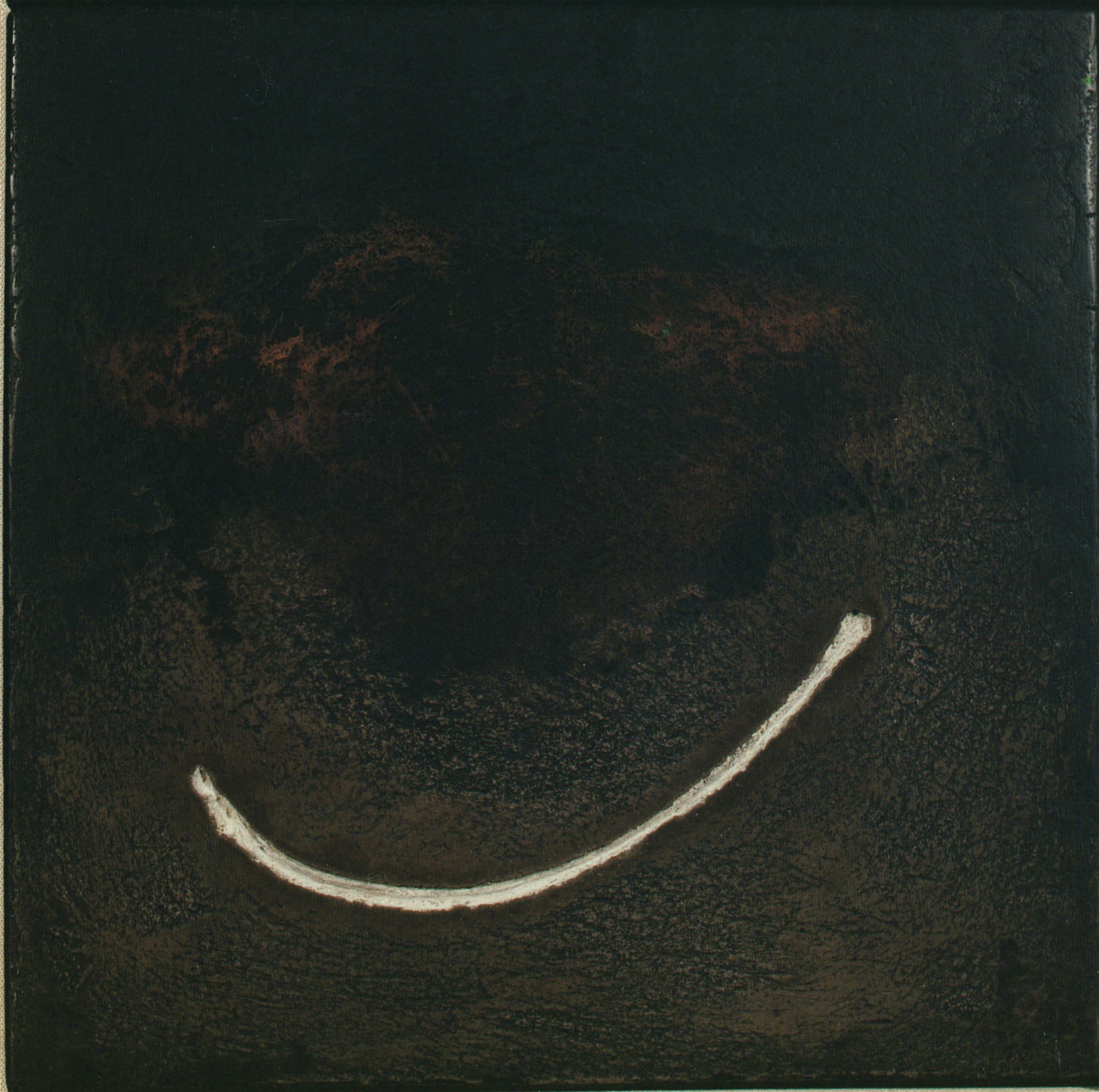
EVA - Libro (2005)*

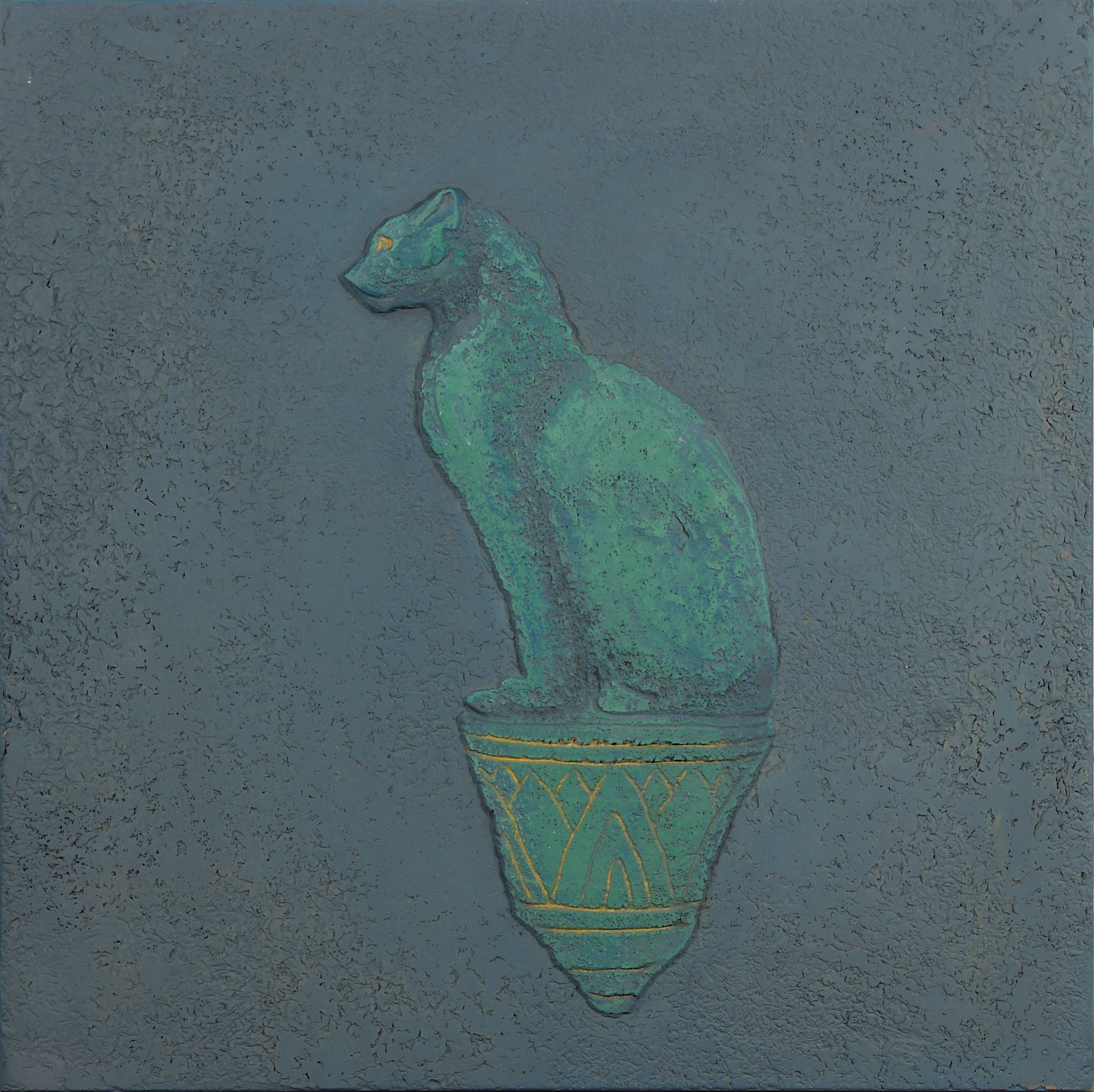
Renacer (2010)*

*Works from the private collection of the Ōoka Makoto Kotoba Museum, Mishima, Japan.

== Exhibitions ==
Selected solo and group exhibitions;

- 2021 – Group exhibition at Encant (Mahón, Minorca, Spain).
- 2020 – Solo exhibition at Yamaguchi Gallery (Chiba, Japan).
- 2017 – Solo exhibitions at Yamaguchi Gallery (Chiba, Japan), Libre Gallery (Tokyo, Japan) and Encant (Mahón, Minorca, Spain).
- 2016 – Solo exhibition at Galerie Couteron (Paris, France).
- 2014 – Solo exhibition at Libre Gallery (Tokyo, Japan).
- 2013 – Solo exhibition at Yamaguchi Gallery (Chiba, Japan).
- 2012 – Solo exhibitions at Gallery Ecru-no-mori (Mishima, Japan) and Encant (Mahón, Minorca, Spain)
- 2011 – Solo exhibition at Galerie 421 (Tokyo, Japan).
- 2010 – Solo exhibition at Yamaguchi Gallery (Chiba, Japan) and group exhibition at Encant (Mahón, Minorca, Spain).
- 2009 – Solo exhibition at Encant (Mahón, Minorca, Spain) and group exhibition at Punto Arte Gallery (Barcelona, Spain).
- 2008 – Solo exhibition at Okumura Gallery (Tokyo, Japan).
- 2006 – Solo exhibitions at Punto Arte Gallery (Barcelona, Spain) and Yamaguchi Gallery (Chiba, Japan). Group exhibition at Encant (Mahón, Minorca, Spain).
- 2005 – Solo exhibition at Gallery 21 + Yo (Tokyo, Japan) and group exhibitions at Punto Arte Gallery (Barcelona, Spain) and Encant (Mahón, Minorca, Spain).
- 2004 – Group exhibition at Punto Arte Gallery (Barcelona, Spain).
- 2003 – Solo exhibition at Encant (Mahón, Minorca, Spain).
- 2002 – Solo exhibition at Punto Arte Gallery (Barcelona, Spain).
- 2001 – Solo exhibition at the 7th NiCAF* (Nippon International Contemporary Art Fair)(Tokyo, Japan) and group exhibition at JADA (Japan Art Dealers Association)(Tokyo, Japan).
- 2000 – Solo exhibition at Ueda Gallery (Tokyo, Japan) and group exhibition at JADA (Japan Art Dealers Association)(Tokyo, Japan).
- 1999 – Solo exhibitions at Ueda Gallery (Tokyo, Japan) and the 6th NiCAF* (Nippon International Contemporary Art Fair)(Tokyo, Japan). Group exhibition at JADA (Japan Art Dealers Association)(Tokyo, Japan).
- 1998 – Solo exhibition at Ueda Gallery (Tokyo, Japan).
- 1997 – Solo exhibitions at the 5th NiCAF* (Nippon International Contemporary Art Fair)(Tokyo, Japan) and Ueda Gallery (Tokyo, Japan).
- 1996 – Solo exhibition at Artara Gallery (Mahón, Minorca, Spain).
- 1993 – Group exhibition at Helena Ramos Gallery (Cadaqués, Spain).
- 1992 – Group exhibition at Helena Ramos Gallery (Cadaqués, Spain).
- 1991 – Group exhibition at Central Gallery (Sabadell, Spain).
- 1990 – Group exhibitions at Helena Ramos Gallery (Cadaqués, Spain), FIAC SAGA '90 (Paris, France) and Central Gallery (Sabadell, Spain).
- 1989 – Group exhibition at Helena Ramos Gallery (Cadaqués, Spain).

*NICAF (Nippon International Contemporary Art Fair) – Currently known as Art Fair Tokyo.
