= Tama Art University Library =

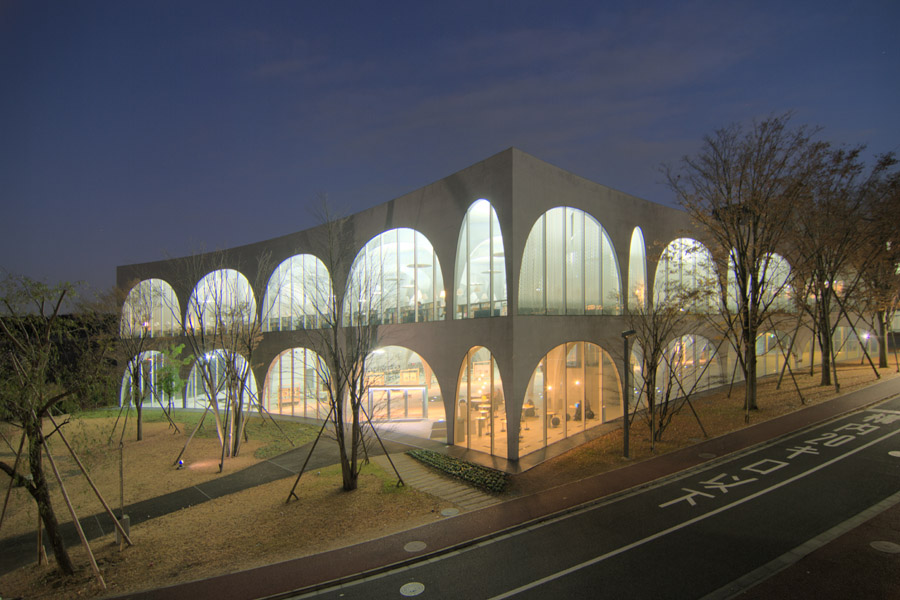
- Hachioji Library built in 2007
- Interactive map of the Tama Art University Library area

General information
- Type: University Library
- Location: Yarimizu, Hachioji, Tokyo, Japan
- Coordinates: 35°36′41″N 139°21′4″E

Design and construction
- Architects: Toyo Ito & Associates

Tama Art University Library is the academic library associated with Tama Art University consisting of two library locations in Tokyo, Japan: one on the Hachioji campus and the other on the Kaminoge campus. Together, the libraries serve university students and faculty. The primary focus is on art education and research. Its collection also includes database materials on design, architecture, film, photography, and other related topics of study.

== Background ==
Hidemi Kondo, head of Tama Art University Library, stated that the Hachioji Library building acts as a source of inspiration for students and faculty of the university. University libraries in general play a major role in their respective locations, but at an art university, the library must also reflect and inspire creativity. Tama Art University Library is a place of collaboration, contemplation, and relaxation, in addition to being a space that encourages community amongst the university. The space was specially designed with relaxation space in mind, with one end of the library used as an open area for visitors to sit and even sleep.

Designed by architect Toyo Ito, the newer of the two libraries that make up Tama Art University Library, the Hachioji location, is viewed as an architectural achievement due to its unique concept and construction. Although both Hachioji and Kaminoge libraries are part of a private higher-education institution, they see many visitors annually, particularly Hachioji Library, which is often admired by non-university visitors because of its notability in the architecture world. “In 2006, the old library had 38,000 visitors, while in 2012 the new library recorded 86,000 visits,” according to The Guardian interviewer Claire Shaw.

== Hachioji Library ==
=== Design and architecture of Hachioji structure ===
The Hachioji Library, situated between Tama Art University's main gate and the center of campus, opened in 2007 after three years of construction. Designed by the 2013 Pritzker Architecture Prize-winning architecture firm Toyo Ito & Associates, the Hachioji campus library has been featured in a variety of professional architecture publications, including DETAIL, Architectural Review, and several others. The building was constructed using both steel and concrete, is two stories high, and also has a basement. It has a total area of 2,224.59 square meters and a total floor area of 5,639.46 square meters.

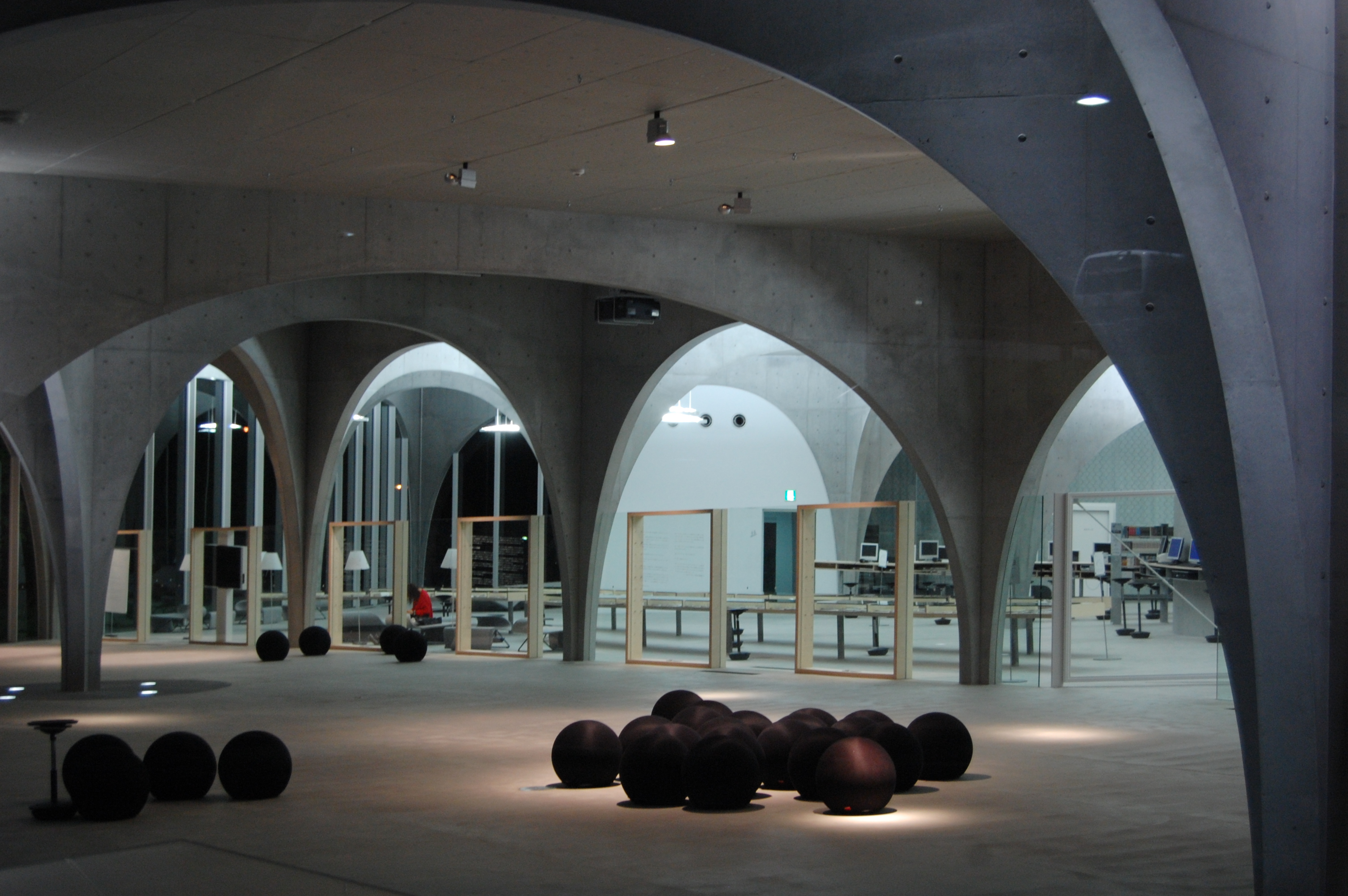
Arches and glass walls inside Hachioji Library

Architect Magazine describes the Toyo Ito structure:

The library takes advantage of a gentle, three-degree slope on its ground floor, with colonnades providing simple, archlike structural support. These arches are formed with plate steel reinforced with concrete, with walls measuring 200 millimeters (about 7.8 inches) thick, with a maximum span of more than 12 meters (39 feet). Rows of these colonnades are arranged in a configuration that produces a variety of interior spatial types and exterior views.

Hachioji Library was designed to complement its physical location. The building's arches, made of steel and concrete, along with the surrounding glass walls, flow with the land that the library sits on. The furniture was specially designed in a similar way, by Fujie Kazuko, to accommodate the landscape's sloping surfaces. Kazuko also created shelves that further balance the aesthetic of the arches with the building's angled floors. These open-access shelves house roughly 100,000 books.

=== Collection ===
Th Hachioji location's collection includes roughly 77,000 Japanese books, 47,000 foreign books, and 1,500 periodicals. Reference materials are dedicated to subjects like art and design, as well as architecture. The library continues to expand its collection with international exhibition catalogs and catalogue raisonnés.

== Kaminoge Library ==
The Kaminoge Library's collection, made up of approximately 48,000 books and 300 periodicals, concentrates on topics such as photography, film, and theater. This library includes special collections recognizing artist and poet Shūzō Takiguchi (1903–1979) and photographer Katué Kitasono (1902–1978). The Takiguchi collection has 10,000 publications, and the Kitazono collection is characterized by posters of the Dada and Surrealist styles. Although the Kaminoge Library is not yet open to the public, its collection is publicly available via its OPAC, as are portions of its special collections.
