= Jin Katagiri =

Japanese comedian and actor

Jin Katagiri (片桐 仁, Katagiri Jin; born November 27, 1973) is a comedian, actor, sculptor, and potter from Saitama Prefecture, Japan. He graduated from Kasukabe High School and Tama Art University. Outside Japan, he is most well known for playing the PC (opposite Kentarō Kobayashi who plays the Mac) in the "Get A Mac" advertising campaign in Japan. He is a member of the Rahmens owarai comedy duo.

== Filmography ==
=== Film ===
- I Am a Hero (2016) – Korori Nakata
- Too Young to Die! (2016) – Onino
- Rin (2018)
- Lost in Ramen (2018)
- Aircraft Carrier Ibuki (2019) – Kazuma Tōdō
- I Was a Secret Bitch (2020) – Nagata
- Your Turn to Kill: The Movie (2021)
- 99.9 Criminal Lawyer: The Movie (2021) – Tatsuya Akashi
- School Meals Time: School Excursion Inferno (2025) – Teruo Kabasawa

=== Television dramas ===
- Kamen Rider Double (2009) – Ikari (ep. 7 - 8)/Cockroach Dopant (ep. 7 - 8)
- All Esper Dayo! SP (2015) – Teacher Yukio Kajimoto
- 99.9 (2016) – Tatsuya Akashi
- Gu.ra.me! (2016) – Kanda
- Your Turn to Kill (2019)
- Yell (2020) – Kenzō Ōkura
- Unbound (2025), Yashichi

=== Television programs ===
- Geki ka wa petto dai shūgō! Wan Nyan Ninoland (TV Tokyo, August 2024) (co-hosted by Arashi's Kazunari Ninomiya and Shimofuri Myojo's Seiya Ishikawa, narrated by Moka Kamishiraishi and him)

=== Anime ===
- Green vs. Red (2008) – Yasuo
- Bessatsu Olympia Kyklos (2020) – Head of the Village

== See also ==
- Apple Inc. advertising
- List of Japanese comedians
- Owarai
