= Nui Sano =

Japanese painter (1932–2023)

Nui Sano (Japanese: 佐野 ぬい, romanized: Sano Nui; November 16, 1932 – August 23, 2023) was a Japanese yōga ("Western-style") painter. She was known for her rhythmic, abstract style and her frequent use of the color blue. A longtime instructor at the Joshibi University of Art and Design, she served as the school's president from 2007 to 2011.

== Biography ==
Sano was born Nui Sakaki (Japanese: 佐々木 ぬい) in Hirosaki, Japan, in 1932. Her family owned a sweets shop and a tearoom, where she was exposed to gatherings of classical musicians, writers, and painters. She attended a girls' school there, then enrolled in the Joshibi University of Art and Design, a private women's art school near Tokyo, in 1951.

Sano pursued a career as a painter, moving beyond representational art and into abstract, rhythmic, colorful forms. She also stayed on at Joshibi as an instructor after her 1955 graduation and, later, as president of the university from 2007 to 2011. From 2004 to 2007, she served as executive director of the Japan Artists Association.

Fascinated by the West from a young age, having seen French films and heard French poetry growing up, she traveled abroad to Europe, North Africa, and the United States to pursue further studies. Sano is considered a yōga, or Western-style, painter. Her work is best known for her use of the color blue, across its range of tones and shades, in a style that has been dubbed "Sano Blue" (佐野ブルー)—earning her the nickname "The Blue Painter" (青の画家).

Her work has been exhibited widely in Japan and abroad, notably by the women artists' group Joryū Gaka Kyōkai, and is held in the collections of the Aomori Museum of Art; the Hirosaki City Museum; the Museum of Modern Art, Kamakura & Hayama; and others. Since 2010, a stained-glass piece designed by Sano has been displayed at Narita Yukawa Station, and in 2014, another stained-glass work of hers was installed in her native Hirosaki's city hall.

In 2012, Sano was honoured as a member of the Order of the Sacred Treasure. She died from heart failure on August 23, 2023, at the age of 90.
