= Monroe C. Gutman Library =

Building at Harvard Graduate School of Education

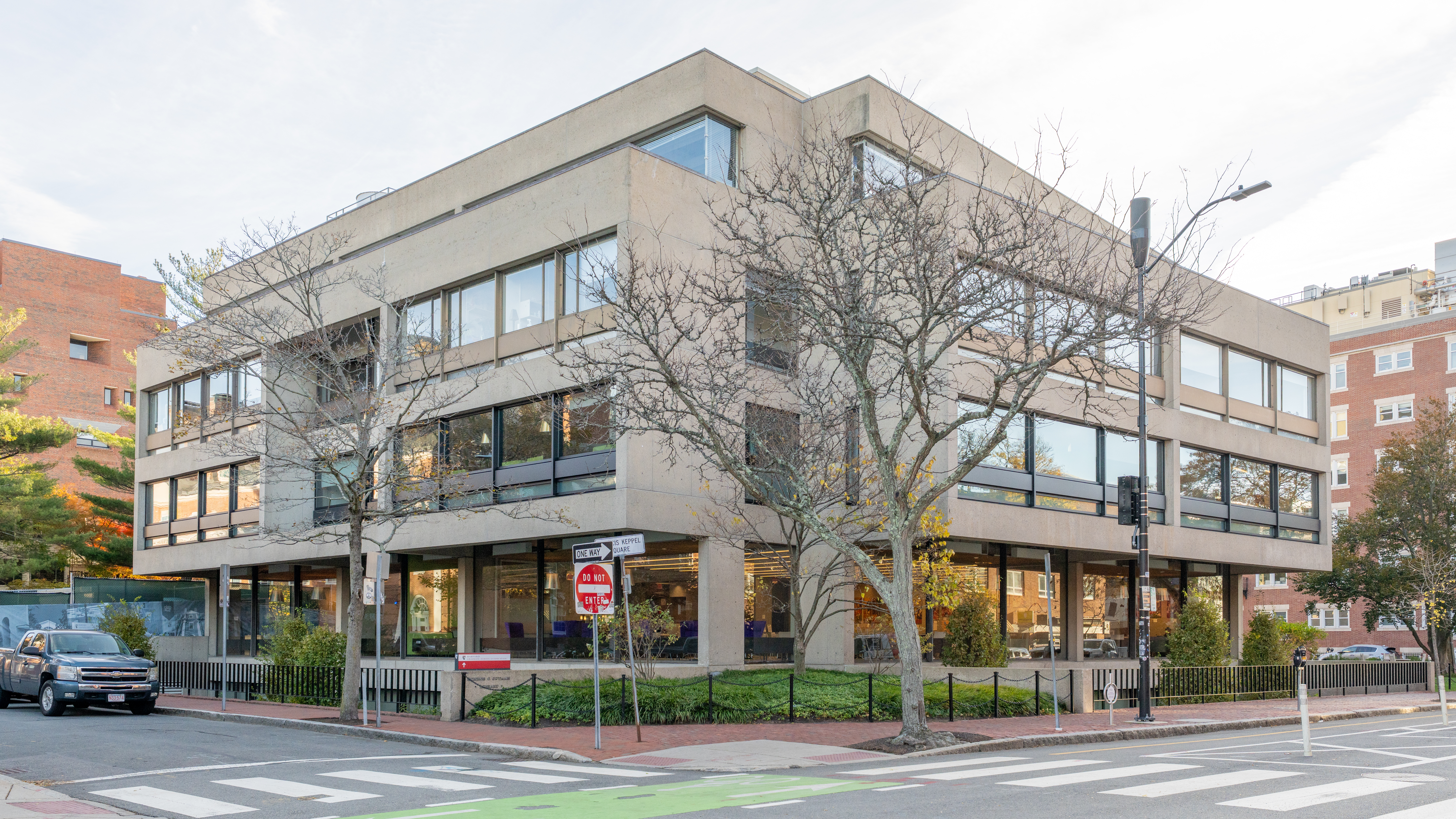
- Monroe C. Gutman Library
- 42.37496148663607°N 71.12122558872525°W
- Location: Cambridge, Massachusetts, United States
- Type: Academic library
- Established: 1905

Other information
- Affiliation: Harvard University
- Website: https://www.gse.harvard.edu/library

The Monroe C. Gutman Library is the primary library for and one of four main buildings comprising the Harvard Graduate School of Education (HGSE). It is named for its principal benefactor, investment banker and Harvard College 1905 alumnus Monroe C. Gutman (1888 - 1974) who gifted the library $1.13 million.

In addition to its academic and library functions, Gutman serves as a primary gathering place for HGSE students and a public exhibition space for artwork. Unlike other libraries on Harvard's campus, Gutman is not open 24 hours a day.

The building's features include special collections, classrooms, study spaces, a conference center, computer services, bookstacks and eating commons. It also hosts exhibits: in 2011, it hosted Junko Kayashige's art.

== History and recent activity ==
- 1902 - HGSE founded
- 1972 - Gutman library opens as HGSE's first library building. Previously, materials supporting the study of education were hosted in various campus locations and a small working collection in Longfellow Hall
- 1974 - Boston Society of Architects awarded the Benjamin Thompson and Associates design the prestigious Harleston Parker Medal
- 2012 - Recent renovation receives LEED Platinum certification for its sustainability features, including a green wall and water bottle filling stations
- 2017 - In an email circulated to the HGSE community on October 3, 2017, the school announced its plans to launch a 2-year renovation project to improve the Gutman Conference Center

== Leadership ==
According to a 2016 job posting, the Librarian and Director of the Monroe C. Gutman Library holds a courtesy faculty appointment (without teaching obligations), participates on the Library Leadership Team led by the Vice President for the Harvard Library, and reports jointly to the Executive Dean and the Associate Dean for Learning and Teaching. Alex Hodges, formerly faculty at American University in Washington, D.C., has held this position since 2017.
