= Reikichi Kita =

Japanese philosopher and politician

- 北 昤吉
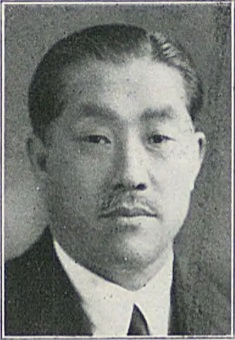

Member of the House of Representatives
- In office 20 February 1936 – 25 April 1958
- Constituency: Niigata 1st district

Policy Research Council Chairman, Japan Liberal Party

Chairman of the House of Representatives Disciplinary Committee
- In office 1955–1955

Personal details
- Born: July 21, 1885 Minato, Sado District, Niigata Prefecture, Empire of Japan (present-day Sado City)
- Died: August 5, 1961 (aged 76)
- Party: Independent; Constitutional Democratic Party; Liberal Party (1945); Liberal Party (1950); Japan Democratic Party; Liberal Democratic Party
- Spouse: Matsue Kita (née Honma)
- Relatives: Ikki Kita (elder brother)
- Education: Waseda University
- Occupation: Philosopher, educator, political commentator, politician

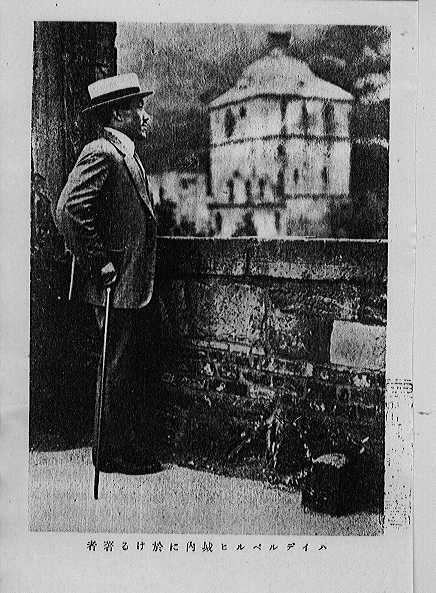
Reikichi Kita at Heidelberg Castle, Germany, 1921

Reikichi Kita (北 昤吉, Kita Reikichi, 21 July 1885 – 5 August 1961) was a Japanese philosopher, educator, political commentator, and politician. He served eight terms in the House of Representatives and was a founder of Tama Art University. He also served as Policy Research Council Chairman of the Japan Liberal Party. He was the younger brother of Ikki Kita, one of the main ideologues of the February 26 Incident.

== Early life and education ==
Born in Minato Town (now part of Sado City), Niigata Prefecture, Kita was the second son of Keitaro Kita, the first mayor of Ryotsu Town and a sake and fertilizer merchant.

He entered Waseda University’s Faculty of Political Economy but soon transferred to the Department of Philosophy. He graduated in 1908. After graduation, he worked as a middle school teacher before becoming a lecturer at Waseda University in 1913.

== Academic and intellectual career ==
Kita emerged as a prominent figure in the Taishō democracy movement. He debated with Yoshino Sakuzō on the theoretical foundations of minponshugi (people-centered constitutionalism). He also conducted research on hypnotism together with figures such as Yanagita Kunio.

In 1918, with support from politician Mitsuchi Chūzō, he studied abroad for four and a half years. After a year at Harvard University, he traveled through Europe and spent significant time in Germany (Berlin and Heidelberg), returning to Japan at the end of 1922.

Upon return, he taught at Daito Bunka Academy (now Daito Bunka University) and Taisho University, and worked as editorial supervisor for the Nihon newspaper. In 1928 he founded the review magazine Sokoku (祖国, Fatherland), which he edited.

In 1929, he became the founder and first principal of Teikoku Art School (present-day Musashino Art University). Following a student strike and split in 1935, he established Tama Imperial Art School, which later became Tama Art University, where he served as honorary principal.

== Political career ==
Kita was elected to the House of Representatives in the February 1936 general election as an independent from Niigata 1st district, shortly before the February 26 Incident. He later joined the Constitutional Democratic Party.

In 1939, Kita participated in a Japanese parliamentary delegation to the Inter-Parliamentary Union conference in Oslo, Norway (August 1939), traveling through the United States and Europe from June to October together with fellow Representative Inejirō Asanuma. The two left Tokyo Station by train on 30 June 1939; during the voyage Asanuma held frequent discussions with Kita and read extensively from the works of Kita's elder brother Ikki Kita.

After Japan’s defeat in World War II, he played an important role in founding the Japan Liberal Party. After being subject to the postwar purge and later released, he continued his political career with the Japan Democratic Party and then the Liberal Democratic Party. He served as Chairman of the House of Representatives Disciplinary Committee in 1955 and as Policy Research Council Chairman of the Liberal Party.

== Personal life ==
Kita was a Buddhist. His hobbies included reading and fishing.

His wife, Matsue (also called Yoshiko, born 1890), was the daughter of Niigata Prefectural Assembly member Honma Ichimatsu. The couple had five daughters. His elder brother was the nationalist thinker Ikki Kita.

== Family and relatives ==
- Wife: Matsue (born 1890, also known as Yoshiko. Daughter of Honma Ichimatsu, a Niigata prefectural assembly member; niece of Reikichi's mother Riku)
- Eldest daughter: Michi (born 1912, Fukushima Prefecture; wife of Imaizumi Tadashi (Note: Composer Yasushi Akutagawa's maternal cousin))
- Second daughter: Sachi (born 1915; wife of Shimizu Tarō)
- Third daughter (born 1918)
- Fourth daughter (born 1926)
- Fifth daughter
- Father: Keitarō Kita (1853–1903) — First mayor of Ryōtsu Town. Born as the eldest son of Roku (daughter of a wealthy brewing family in Ryōtsu) and her husband Rokutarō. Keitarō was known for seeing fireballs and ghosts; according to Reikichi, this strong spiritual sensitivity was inherited by his elder brother, Ikki Kita. He was involved in the Freedom and People's Rights Movement. During his time as mayor in 1890 he was caught up in the Aikawa Riot (a Rice riot), and in 1900 his family business failed (according to Reikichi, due to a relative's debt guarantee issue), leading to its closure. After Keitarō's death, his maternal uncle Honma Ichimatsu acted as a surrogate father and provided financial support for the education of Ikki and Reikichi.
- Mother: Riku (1856–1939) — From Niibo Village. Maiden name Honma. In Sado there was an old custom that childbirth took place at the mother's family home, with the mother returning to her husband's home on the 33rd day; thus Reikichi and his siblings were born at their mother's family home. Niibo Village was known as a devout area as the location of the Nichiren sect's Konpon-ji (Sado) temple. Reikichi's wife Matsue (Yoshiko)'s biological father was Riku's younger brother. A distant relative (husband of the daughter of Riku's niece) is Tamba Tetsurō.
- Elder brother: Ikki Kita (political thinker) — Executed in connection with the February 26 Incident.

== Major works (selected) ==
- Time and Free Will: Introduction to Philosophy (1914)
- From Philosophy to Politics (1918)
- Light from the East (1918)
- Philosophical Pilgrimage (1926)
- Showa Restoration (1927)
- Thought and Life (1937)
- Philosophy of War (1943)

He translated works by Henri Bergson, Harald Høffding, and others, and wrote extensively on philosophy, politics, and international affairs.
