= Kentarō Kobayashi =

Japanese comedian and actor

- Born: 17 April 1973 (age 53); Kanagawa Prefecture, Japan
- Occupations: Comedian, actor, dramaturge, theatre director, and manga artist
- Website: kentarokobayashi.net

Notes
- Same year/generation as: Drunk Dragon; Shinagawa Shoji

Kentarō Kobayashi (小林 賢太郎, Kobayashi Kentarō; born 17 April 1973) is a Japanese comedian, actor, dramaturge, theatre director, and manga artist. Outside Japan, he is most well known for directing and acting in "The Japanese Tradition (日本の形)" videos (e.g. "Sushi (鮨)"), and for playing the Mac (opposite Jin Katagiri who plays the PC) in the "Get a Mac" advertising campaign in Japan. He is a member of the Rahmens owarai comedy duo. His manga series, Hana Usagi, ran from 1999 to 2004 in Young Magazine Uppers (published by Kodansha).

== Controversy ==
Kobayashi was assigned the role of Director of the Tokyo Olympics Opening Ceremony; however, a 1998 comedy show recording of him making an insensitive joke about the Holocaust surfaced. In that comedy show, he said "We tried to play Holocaust with these human-shaped papers for a kids TV show, but our producer heavily scolded us." It was pointed out that Kobayashi's selection may violate the Olympic Charter, which advocates anti-discrimination. On 22 July, State Minister of Defense Yasuhide Nakayama updated his Twitter account. He posted: "I immediately contacted and talked to Simon Wiesenthal Center (SWC)." The SWC released a statement and expressed the view that Kobayashi's jokes include those for people with disabilities. On 22 July 2021, the Tokyo Organising Committee of the Olympic and Paralympic Games (TOCOG) dismissed Kobayashi. He made an apology comment and said: "My job is to entertain people. I should not make people feel uncomfortable. I understand that my stupid choice of words at that time was wrong, and I regret it."

== See also ==
- Apple Inc. advertising
- List of Japanese comedians
- Owarai
