= Ishida Eiichirō =

Japanese folklorist and ethnologist

- 石田 英一郞
- Born: 13 June 1903; Osaka, Japan
- Died: 9 November 1968 (aged 65)
- Occupation: Ethnologist
- Relatives: Sukenari Yokoyama (brother-in-law)

Ishida Eiichirō (石田 英一郞; 13 June 1903 – 9 November 1968) was a Japanese scholar of folklore.

== Biography ==
He became a communist at an early age, and was convicted under the Peace Preservation Law in 1928 and sentenced to five years jail. During his term of incarceration, he read widely, both in the Chinese classics and Western anthropology. On his release in 1934, he attended a lecture by the doyen of folklore studies, Yanagita Kunio, where he became acquainted with Oka Masao, who had just returned from completing a degree in ethnology at Vienna University. Through Oka's offices he was introduced to, and married, a granddaughter of Yanagita's older brother. Vexations were not wholly relieved by this advantageous connection. He remained unemployed, and had to suffer monthly visits by police agents who kept him under surveillance. The impasse in his career was overcome when Oka managed to secure for him a scholarship to study abroad at his own alma mater, Vienna University.

At the late age of 34, Ishida began following lectures there from March 1937. After Hitler's invasion and annexation of Austria, many of his teachers in ethnology, among them Father Wilhelm Schmidt, the world-famous linguist and anthropologist were forced into exile, and with the outbreak of World War II he himself was repatriated on the last available ship for Japanese nationals sailing from Bordeaux, the Kagoshima-maru.

His expertise in ethnography was quickly turned to profitable uses on his return, and he finally received employment as member of a government organization interested in research on folk minorities in East Asia. In 1941, he surveyed the tribes of southern Sakhalin/Karafuto, such as the Gilyak (Nivkhs), the Ainu and the Oroks.

== Sources ==
- Ishida Eiichirō, Momotarō no haha (1966), Kōdansha Gakujutsu Bunko, Tokyo 1984 pp. 323–337
