= Joshibi University of Art and Design =

Private women's art school in Japan

Coordinates: 35°31′43″N 139°23′20″E

- Type: Private
- Established: 1900
- Affiliations: Joshibi High School of Art and Design
- Location: Sagamihara (Kanagawa Prefecture) and Tokyo, Japan
- Campus: Sagamihara, Suginami
- Website: https://www.joshibi.ac.jp/

Joshibi University of Art and Design (女子美術大学, Joshibijutsu Daigaku) (abbreviated "女子美 (Joshibi)") is a private women's art school in Suginami and Sagamihara in Japan.

The mission and aims of Joshibi, are developing creative minds, encouraging students to contribute to local, national and international societies, female independence and evaluation of social status for women through fine art and design, as well as training and educating qualified art teachers and creative artists.

Joshibi was the first fine art institution for female students in Japan, and is the oldest private art school.

== History ==
Joshibi was founded on October 30, 1900, as Private Women's School of Fine Arts (PWSFA) in Hongo-ku (now Bunkyo-ku); female students were not admitted to membership of the Tokyo University of the Arts until 1946.

Joshibi founding members include Tamako Yokoi (former tutor of Joshi-Gakuin School) and Bunzo Fujita (former Professor of Tokyo University of Arts). Fujita served the first principal, and created school's logo "美 (Bi)". PWSFA was officially oped in April 1901 with 60 students at Yumi-cho. PWSFA suffered from financial difficulties six months after the school opened. Yokoi and Fujita petitioned Shidu Sato (wife of Susumu Sato (military physician)). Sato's family owned PWSFA in January 1902, Shidu served the second principal. Yokoi died on January 4, 1903, from stomach cancer.

The Yumi-cho campus burned down in October 1908. The Kikuzaka campus was opened at Kikuzaka-cho in July 1909. Joshibi High School of Art and Design was opened in April 1915, Fujita served as the first school principal.

PWSFA was renamed Women's School of Fine Arts (WSFA) in 1919. WSFA was accredited by the Ministry of Education as a vocational college in 1929, renamed Women's Academy of Fine Arts (WAFA). WAFA moved to Suginami in January 1935 due to increasing enrolment. The Ministry of Education introduced a new university education law in 1949; WAFA was renamed Women's College of Fine Arts (WCFA).

The College of Art and Design relocated to Sagamihara in 1990 due to campus expansion. Master's degree programs started in 1994, and Ph.D. programs started in 1996.

WCFA was renamed Joshibi University of Art and Design in 2001. Joshibi Art Museum (JAM) was opened at Sagamihara campus in 2002.

The College of Art and Design underwent restructuring into three departments and 13 majors in April 2010.

== Academics ==
The College of Art and Design offers Bachelors of Fine Arts (BFA four-year) in three departments with 13 majors:

- Department of Fine Arts: Oil Painting and Printing, Nihonga, Sculpture, Art Theory and Practice, Art Education.
- Department of Design and Crafts: Crafts, Visual Design, Product Design, Environmental Design.
- Department of Cross Disciplinary Art and Design: Media Art, Art and Design for Healing, Fashion design, Art Produce and Museum Study.

The Junior College of Art Design offers Associate degrees of Fine Arts (AFA two-year) in three majors:

- Fine Arts
- Information Design
- Creative Design

Master and Doctor of Philosophy (Ph.D.) degree programs are offered for female and male students in three areas: Fine Art, Design, Art and Cultural Studies.

== Campuses, museum, and galleries ==
- Suginami Campus: Established in 1935, in Wada, Suginami. The Department of Cross-Disciplinary Art and Design, Graduate School of Art and Design, Junior College of Art and Design, Joshibi High School of Art and Design, University Headquarters, Alumnae Association Head Office are on the Suginami Campus.
- Sagamihara Campus: Established in 1990, in Asamizo-dai, Sagamihara. The College of Art and Design (Department of Fine Arts, Department of Design and Crafts), Graduate School of Art and Design are on the Sagamihara Campus.
- Joshibi Art Museum (JAM) on the Sagamihara Campus opened in 2001. The museum's collection more than 15,000 works of art include Okubo Fukuko, Kataoka Tamako, Gokura Kazuko, Tada Minami, Migishi Setsuko. The museum has strong relationship with female artists and focusing on their art. The museum had acquired a part of the former Kanebo Collection in 2009. It's one of the largest textile collections in Japan which covers from the ancient to the contemporary textiles from around the world.
- Joshibi Galleria nike is an art gallery re-opened in July 2012, on the Suginami Campus. Galleria nike is a working art gallery where public exhibition, research, teaching and learning intersect. The historical hall is the affiliated hall to Galleria nike introducing history of Joshibi and art works. All the collections are open to the public.
- Joshibi Art Gallery in Shanghai is an art gallery opened in November 2012 in Shanghai, China as an art project related to the 40th anniversary of the normalization of diplomatic relations between Japan and China. The gallery is affiliated to JAM and the first art gallery established by Japanese art university outside Japan. It introduces art works of Joshibi graduates and lecturers, new artists, teaching and learning intersect.

== Notable alumna ==
- Reine Hibiki
- Junko Kayashige
- Kanako Higuchi
- Fumiko Hori
- Yuki Kiriga
- Aki Kondo
- Samizu Matsuki
- Tomoko Naraoka
- Nagi Noda
- Nui Sano
- Yuko Yamaguchi
- Kazuko Nakamura
