= Teiji Takai =

Japanese painter (1911–1986)

- 高井貞二
- Born: February 5, 1911; Osaka City, Japan
- Died: June 26, 1986; Tokyo, Japan
- Education: Shinanobashi Institute of Western Painting
- Known for: Painting
- Style: Semi-figurative
- Movement: Surrealism, Abstract Expressionism
- Awards: Nika Special Prize (1940), Okada Award (1943), Fukushima Prize (1963)

Teiji Takai (高井貞二, Takai Teiji, February 5, 1911 – June 26, 1986) was a Japanese painter who first came to prominence as a Surrealist in the 1930s. After WWII, Takai moved to the United States in 1954 and established himself as an Abstract Expressionist painter. Takai later created semi-figurative works with simple motifs such as fish and birds. Takai’s works are held in major museum collections including the Corcoran Gallery of Art, Washington, D.C., the Museum of Modern Art, Wakayama, the National Museum of Modern Art, Tokyo, the Yellowstone Art Museum, Billings, Montana, among other venues.

== Biography ==
=== Early life and career (1911–1945) ===
Born in Osaka City, Takai moved to Kōyaguchi-chō, Ito District (now Hashimoto City), Wakayama Prefecture, when he went a primary school. He began to study oil painting while he was in Ito Junior High School in Wakayama. After graduating from junior high school, while working at his uncle Chōichi Inoue's Japan Air Transport Institute, he attended the Shinanobashi Institute of Western Painting, where he was taught by Narashige Koide, Jūtarō Kuroda, Katsuyuki Nabei, and others.

In 1930, Takai moved to Tokyo. In the same year, at the age of 19, his Civilization (Bunmei) was selected for the 17th Nika Exhibition. The current location of this memorable work is unknown, but the reproduced image shows the strong influence of Harue Koga, with its depictions of ships, factories and aeroplanes, which are reminiscent of Koga's The Sea (Umi). Thereafter, Takai exhibited a series of works strongly oriented towards Surrealism at the Nika exhibitions, and attracted attention as a Surrealist painter. His painting style during this period was characterised by motifs of mechanical civilisation, rich colours, and sophisticated compositions, but from around 1935, romantic motifs such as white horses, fields, peonies, and rainbows began to appear. Takai also made illustrations for Yasunari Kawabata's Lyric Poem (Jojōka) and other literary works. In 1930, Takai joined the Bauhaus-inspired artist group New Form Studio (Shin zōkei kōbō 新造型工房), founded by Seiji Tōgō and Kigen Nakagawa. In 1931, Takai co-founded the New Oil Painting Group (Shin abura-e no kai 新油絵の会) and held a group exhibition at the Shiseidō Gallery. In 1938, he co-founded the Ninth Room Society (Kyū-shitsu kai 九室会) with Yuki Katsura, Yoshishige Saitō, Takeo Yamaguchi, Jirō Yoshihara, among others. Tsuguharu Fujita and Seiji Tōgō took on advisory roles in the Ninth Room Society. Shunsuke Matsumoto also joined the group a year later. Takai participated in the first (1939) and second (1940) exhibitions of the Ninth Room Society, as well as its 'Aviation Exhibition' (1941).

From around 1940, wartime controls were imposed and repression of avant-garde art intensified, and in 1941 the Surrealists Ichirō Fukuzawa and Shuzō Takiguchi were arrested. The Ninth Room Society was dissolved in 1941, and Takai's painting style also changed from Surrealism to figurative painting. Takai was awarded the Nika Special Prize in 1940 for Returning People (Kaeru hitobito) and Town of Emigrant (Emiguranto no machi). The following year, he was accepted as a Nika Association member, and in 1943 he exhibited at the 6th Bunten Exhibition and won the Okada Award for Boys at the Border (Kokkyō no shōnentachi). During this period, his motifs were mainly landscapes of mainland China and war scenes. Takai visited the front in China as a military painter in 1938 and 1942. Some of Takai's war paintings survive and they are in the collection of the Museum of Modern Art, Wakayama.

=== Early postwar period (1945–1954) ===
After the war, the Nika Association, which had been dissolved in October 1944, was re-established by Seiji Tōgō and others. However, a number of artists including Junkichi Mukai, Saburō Miyamoto, and Kōnosuke Tamura refused to rejoin, instead establishing the Kōdō Bijutsu Association (行動美術協会; literally "Action Art Society") and the Second Era Society (Niki-kai; 二紀会). Takai also joined Junkichi Mukai in eschewing the Nika Association in favor of co-founding the Kōdō Bijutsu Association in November 1945. As a founding member, Takai actively participated in the group's exhibitions, while also exhibiting at the Yomiuri Indépendant and other venues. During this period, Takai produced many figurative paintings in bright, vivid colours, marking his dramatic rebirth after the suppression of creativity under the wartime regime. In addition, Takai frequently painted Marie Laurencin-like dreamy images of women. Takai resigned from the Kōdō Bijutsu Association in 1951.

=== American years (1954–1963) ===
In December 1954, Takai arrived in Hawaii. During his seven-month stay, Takai held two solo exhibitions in Honolulu. In July of the following year, Takai moved to New York where he had another solo exhibition at the Collector's Gallery in June 1956. Takai exhibited his Abstract Expressionist paintings there, which were in tune with the mainstream at the time. In the autumn of 1958, he signed a contract with the Poindexter Gallery, a renowned New York gallery, where he had his first solo show the following year. From then on, Takai exhibited regularly at the Poindexter Gallery and established himself as an Abstract Expressionist artist in the New York art world. The Poindexter Gallery represented major Abstract Expressionists, including Willem de Kooning, Franz Kline, among others. At the time, Takai's work was generally characterized by dynamic gestures and rich colors. However, from around 1961, a gradual change in style began to appear. Broad blank spaces and silences began to appear on his canvas. Takai's 61–4 (1961) and in Aka (1963) were acquired by the Corcoran Gallery of Art, Washington, D.C.

=== Later years (1963–1986) ===
From around 1963, in a dramatic change from his previous Abstract Expressionist paintings, Takai began to paint semi-figurative motifs such as fish, birds, butterflies, plants, the sun, shellfish, horses and people. In his first series of fish, for example, the boldly deformed fish are depicted in clear colors and large sizes that take up much of the picture plane. A fine sense of color and a neat compositional structure complete the sophisticated composition, staving off the risk of falling into graphic design with such motifs. Takai called these series 'joyism'.

In 1963, Takai held a solo exhibition in Tokyo for the first time in many years. In the same year, he exhibited at the 17th Second Era Exhibition and became a member of the Second Era Society. He was also awarded the 3rd Fukushima Prize. In 1979, he held a retrospective exhibition at the Museum of Modern Art, Wakayama, and the following year he had another at the Tokushima Prefecture Kyōdo Bunka Kaikan, where about 120 of his works were exhibited.

Takai died in Tokyo on June 26, 1986 at the age of 75.
