= Yoshishige Saitō =

Japanese visual artist and art educator

Yoshishige Saitō (斎藤義重, Saitō Yoshishige, also Saitō Gijū or Saito Ghiju, May 4, 1904, in Hirosaki – June 13, 2001, in Yokohama) was a Japanese visual artist and art educator.

Saitō was a seminal figure in Japanese art of the 20th century and a crucial link between the prewar avant-garde and postwar abstract art in Japan. From early on, he was exposed to Post-Impressionism and the avant-garde movements, including Russian constructivism and European Dada, as well as Western literature and Marxism. In the 1930s, he became active in the avant-garde art circles, while pursuing abstraction in paintings and wood reliefs, most notably the relief series of Kara kara and Toro Wood. All of his prewar works and related materials were lost to an air-raid fire in 1945, some of them were reconstructed in the 1970s.

In the immediate postwar years, Saitō's return to art was slow, but by 1957, he established himself again in the art world as a prominent abstract artist. His painting imbued with a great sense of formalism was first followed by his "drill paintings" during the Informel period and then by the return to wood reliefs, which would later lead to large-scale "spatial constructions" made of painted plywood in the 1980s. In these works in wood, he critically engaged with the issues of painting, while exploring the potential of mundane plywood to construct spaces.

As a professor at the Tama Art University and the Tokyo School of Art, Saitō inspired a great number of art students, especially the future artists of the Mono-ha movement.

== Biography ==
=== Early life and career ===
Born in Hirosaki in 1904 as the son of an army officer, Saitō grew up in a wealthy environment in Tokyo. In his childhood, he encountered European architecture and painting in photographs and postcards owned by his father. Saitō attended the Nihon Chūgakkō (Japan Middle School) and joined the school's art club; in his youth painted landscapes and figure paintings in the style of Paul Cézanne and Vincent van Gogh. He was an avid reader of European and Russian literature, including works by Fyodor Dostoevsky, Anton Chekhov, and Romain Rolland.

Saitō's engagement with avant-garde art began in the early1920s. He visited the exhibition of Russian Futurist paintings by David Burliuk and Victor Palmov in Tokyo in 1920, attended theater productions by Tomoyoshi Murayama at the Tsukiji Shōgekijō (Tsukiji Small Theater), and learned about European avant-garde art via catalogues and magazines. During this time, he developed a critical stance towards conventional painting for its illusionist and expressive values. He also became more interested in literature and participated in a study group on Marxism. Around 1928, Saitō began to create three-dimensional works, fueled by a closer study of Russian constructivism and European Dada artists such as Jean Arp, Francis Picabia, and Kurt Schwitters.

In 1933, Saitō joined the Avangyarudo Yōga Kenkyūjo (Avant-garde oil painting institute), which had been founded by avant-garde artists such as Seiji Tōgō and Harue Koga and included emerging artists such as Yuki Katsura. Disappointed by its academicism, he quit in 1935. Around this time, Saitō encountered Surrealist writer and critic Shūzō Takiguchi and poet/visual artist Katsue Kitazono, with whom Saitō developed long-lasting friendships. A participant in exhibitions of the Nika Art Association (commonly known as Nika) beginning in 1936, Saitō joined the Kyūshitsukai (Room Nine Society), an avant-garde section within Nika initiated by avant-garde members art such as Takeo Yamaguchi, Jirō Yoshihara, Yuki Katsura, and Teiji Takai, in 1938. He left in 1939 to join the newly founded Bijutsu Bunka Kyōkai (Art and Culture Association) led by Surrealist painter Ichirō Fukuzawa which brought together around 40 avant-garde artists such as Nobuya Abe, Aimitsu, Saburō Asō, Iwami Furusawa, Noburu Kitawaki, and Tadashi Sugimata. In the context of the intensifying oppression of liberal, particularly Surrealist, artists by the militarist Japanese state, Saitō's home was searched by the police in 1942. During the war years, to avoid being drafted, Saitō was registered and worked at a factory producing soap for the military. Shortly before the end of World War II, Saitō's works, notebooks, and other documents were lost in a fire caused by an air raid.

=== Post-World War II life and career ===
In 1946, Saitō shortly took up a job as an editor of the magazine Katei Bunka (Home culture) and invited photographer Kiyoji Ōtsuji to work for the magazine. He quit the job in 1947 and began offering painting classes. In 1947, he participated in the founding of the Nihon Avangyarudo Bijutsuka Kurabu (Japan Avant-Garde Artists Club) initiated by Tarō Okamoto. In 1953, Saitō gave up his membership in the Bijutsu Bunka Kyōkai and remained without affiliation. Experiencing financial and family hardships as well as health problems, Saitō retreated to Urayasu in 1954, where he stayed until his move back to Tokyo in 1960.

Saitō's works were shown in group exhibitions from the early 1950s onwards, including the Nichibei Kōkan Bijtusu 30-nin-ten (US-Japanese exchange exhibition of works by 30 artists) in 1951, the Nihon Kokusai Bijutsuten/International Art Exhibitions, Japan since 1952, the Chūshō and gensō (Abstraction and fantasy) exhibition at the National Museum of Modern Art, Tokyo, in 1953, and the Gendai Nihon Bijutsuten/Contemporary Japanese Paintings Exhibition in 1956.

They year 1957 marked Saitō's breakthrough in the Japanese art world, with his works being included in and awarded prizes at major group exhibitions. In 1958, Saitō's first solo exhibition took place at the Tokyo Gallery at the recommendation of Takiguchi, an advisor to the gallery. The show proved successful for the artist, as all exhibited works were sold and the show cemented Saitō's lifelong close collaboration with the gallery. Subsequently, Saitō's works continued to be shown in numerous major group exhibitions of Japanese contemporary art and painting in Japan and abroad, such as New Japanese Painting and Sculpture in the US in 1965, as well as international events such as the 41st Pittsburgh Bicentennial International Exhibition in 1958, the 5th São Paulo Biennale in 1959, the Venice Biennale and the Guggenheim International Award in 1960.

After his return from his first trip to Europe in 1960 on the occasion of the Venice Biennale, Saitō moved back to Tokyo. Since then Saitō frequently travelled Europe, Egypt, and the US. During his stay in the US in 1965/66, Saitō met Jasper Johns, Yayoi Kusama, Shūsaku Arakawa, On Kawara, and attended events by John Cage and Fluxus artists.

=== Teaching ===
In 1964 Saitō became a professor at the Tama Art University in Tokyo. Saitō's classes were known for the unconventional teaching methods he used to foster his students' artistic autonomy (e.g. non-hierarchic group discussions and one-on-one communication) and to dismantle academic concepts. He eagerly introduced and discussed the newest international artistic developments in his classes, such as Earthwork. Among his students were Shingo Honda, Sugao Kishi, Susumu Koshimizu, Katsuhiko Narita, Nobuo Sekine, and Katsurō Yoshida, who later became members of Mono-ha, as well as other members of Bijutsuka Kyōtō Kaigi (Artists Joint-Struggle Council, commonly known as Bikyōtō). During the student protests in the late 1960s, Saitō sided with the students and opposed the university's council. He stopped giving lectures in 1970, and officially quit his position in 1973.

In 1982, the Tokyo School of Art (TSA, 東京芸術専門学校) was founded following Saitō's pedagogical principles. One of them was "not to teach", by which Saitō intended to foster independence and to spur his students to work out their individual approaches without any help. First engaged as a lecturer, he became the school's director in 1985. The school closed in 2000.

Saitō died on June 13, 2001, in Yokohama, at the age of 97.

== Work ==
=== Early work, 1930s ===
During the 1930s Saitō transitioned from a geometric semi-figurative painting style towards a completely abstract visual language, which consisted in spatial arrangements of geometric forms that echoed approaches by European abstract artists such as Jean Arp, Hans Erni, Naum Gabo, Jean Hélion, Arthur Jackson, Fernand Léger, or Antoine Pevsner. In 1930, Saitō applied for the 18th Nika Exhibition with a relief-like work, but unable to decide whether it should enter the sections of painting or sculpture, he withdrew. His mixed-media collages Kara kara (1936), which were reconstructed in the 1970s, combined elements of Surrealist object, geometric abstract painting and constructivism. In 1938, Saitō began to apply stripe- and oval-shaped pieces of plywood, which were painted in bright monochrome colors, on white painted framed boards. These works, later titled Toro-uddo (Toro-wood), engaged with Russian constructivism and European abstract art as well as ink rubbings from the Northern Wei dynasty, and challenged characteristics of traditional painting such as expression, flatness, and illusion. Saitō's early works were lost in the fires caused by the air raids during World War II, but some of them were reconstructed by the artist in the mid-1960s.

=== "Era of painting", 1940s–1960 ===
In the immediate postwar years, Saitō created oil paintings on wood with geometrically abstracted and distorted human figures that bore the influence of Picasso's Guernica. Around 1956, the contours of the figurative elements dissolved and were replaced by geometric forms, which, after 1957, evolved to blurred blots and blushes of thinly but opaquely applied paint on undefined monochrome backgrounds. With collapsing fore- and backgrounds, the flatness of the painting surface was emphasized (Example: Oni (Demon), 1957). Though around 1957 the Japanese art world became infatuated with Informel painting, which often involved an expressive dynamic gesturalism and abundant use of paint, Saitō's paintings stood out with their sticky blots of flatly applied paint that seemed to hold the viewer's gaze on the flat surface. To heighten the flat opaque effect, Saitō occasionally used encaustic.

=== Drill works, 1960–1964 ===
In 1960, upon his return from Venice, Saitō began using an electric drill to produce lines and holes on his paintings on wood. In addition to applying brightly colored oil paint to the wood, he took up elements of Informel such as haute pâte, i.e., thick impasto, and scratchy archaic sign-like lines and bruised surfaces, processuality and chance, but still his surfaces maintained their flatness and emphasis on their nature as wooden object. Saitō likely was inspired by Lucio Fontana, whom he had visited during his previous trip to Europe.

=== Return to wooden reliefs, 1964–1975 ===
In 1964, Saitō resumed his prewar practice of making wooden reliefs with shaped plywood pieces and with cutouts that were painted in bright monochrome colors. He created works directly referring to his works from the 1930s such as Kara kara and Toro wood, in which he applied paint in intensive colors and strong contrast by roller, for example red or blue on white backgrounds. He continued to use drills to work lines, holes and dents into the plywood.

From 1967 to 1968 Saitō created wooden reliefs in the shape of everyday objects that were painted in bright contrasting colors. His relief Hanger, Pench, and Crane, which wittily echoed Arp's wooden reliefs from the 1920s (e.g. Shirt and Fork, 1922) as well as US-American pop art and hard-edge painting originating in the 1960s. In the early 1970s, Saitō introduced new forms and materials, producing curved wooden panels and aluminum panels, on which he applied acrylic and lacquer paint instead of oil paint.

=== Dissymmetry and Tree Aiz, 1976–1978 ===
Between 1976 and 1978, Saitō created works of unpainted wooden planks affixed to rectangular wooden frames. In some cases, a bar of plastic or stainless steel was inserted between the planks, or one or two wooden planks were applied diagonally on top as a second layer. Saitō's name and the title of the work were stenciled directly on the planks or on a paper clamped between the wood. These framed arrangements of planks were reminiscent of wooden fences or barricades that barred the viewers' gaze, thus opposing the Italian Renaissance's idea of painting as open window. Saitō went on to experiment with inserting gaps between the planks, with giving them polygonal shapes, recalling Russian constructivists' or Frank Stella's shaped canvasses from the 1960s, or with adding wooden squares onto the layers of planks. These works of unpainted wood include the series Tree Aiz and Dissymmetry (note the title Tree Aiz was a pun on the Japanese word mokume for wood grain) and paralleled his works on paper utilizing diagonal lines, folds tears, and layering. Beginning in 1978, Saitō expanded his work of shaping wooden planks into three dimensions with his construction of wooden regular polyhedrons.

=== Spatial constructions, 1980s–2000 ===
In 1980, Saitō began to create assemblages of conjoined black painted wooden planks to explore the spaces emerging from constellations and emphasized the instability of their construction. The first arrangements, e.g., the Disproportion (1980) and the Triangularly (1981) series, were placed against or mounted on the wall; however, increasingly, and with parts added, they became larger, more complex and reached into the exhibition space. The arrangements became increasingly complex, involving various positions and relations of the lying, standing, hanging, mounted and bolted parts. The black paint covered the wood neatly, so that the texture of the wood became invisible, giving the arrangements a shadow-like matte effect. By highlighting the flatness, Saito reduced the perceptibility of volume and mass, thereby questioning their sculptural appeal. The assemblages often included arrangements, which, not unlike the geometric forms of Russian constructivists El Lissitzky's Proun room, the counter-reliefs of Vladimir Tatlin's, and Robert Morris' beam installations from the 1960s, seemed to defy the laws of gravity. Saitō also combined constructions of black painted planks with circle-shaped wooden parts and everyday materials such as desks, cans of paint, and black board covered with scribbling, highlighting the impression of a temporal experimental work in progress in a studio situation.

Until his death in 2001, Saitō also continued to create framed reliefs using wood, iron, and bronze, as well as paper collages.
