= Yasutake Funakoshi =

Japanese sculptor and painter (1912–2002)

- 舟越 保武
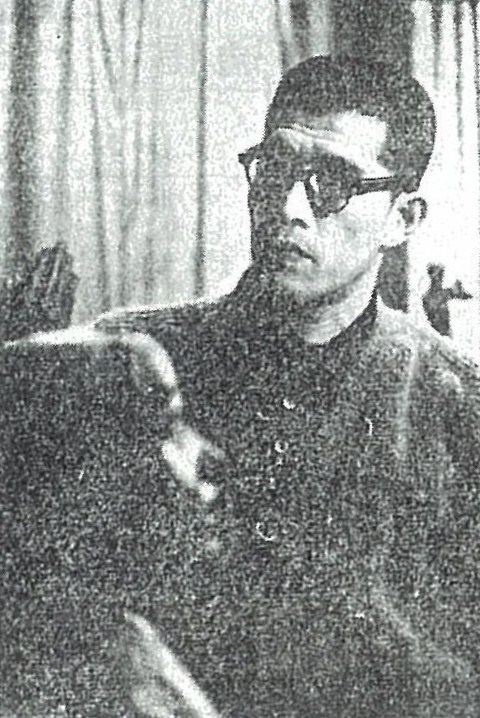
- Funakoshi in the early 1960s
- Born: December 7, 1912; Ichinohe, Iwate, Japan
- Died: February 5, 2002 (aged 89); Tokyo, Japan
- Education: Tokyo University of the Arts; Tama Art University
- Occupations: Sculptor; painter
- Children: Katsura Funakoshi

Yasutake Funakoshi (舟越 保武, Funakoshi Yasutake; December 7, 1912 – February 5, 2002) was a Japanese sculptor and painter.

== Life and work ==
Statue of Tatsuko

Funakoshi was born in what is now the town of Ichinohe in the Iwate Prefecture in northern Honshū. Later he attended middle school in Morioka where the painter Shunsuke Matsumoto was among his schoolmates. In 1939 Funakoshi joined the Shin Seisaku Kyōkai (新制作協会, "association for new art") and helped to organize its sculpture division. Together with Matsumoto he held a shared exhibition in Morioka in 1941. Both artists remained friends until Matsumoto's early death in 1948.

In 1950 Funakoshi showed the sculpture Azalea at the 14th exhibition of the Shin Seisaku Kyōkai. The sculpture was subsequently bought by the ministry of education. In the same year he converted to Catholicism and his new faith proved to have a profound influence on his work, which started to feature Christian motives. From 1958 to 1962 he created the sculptures Twenty-six Martyrs of Japan and later the Hara-no-Jo (原の城, Christian samurai). For the former sculpture he was awarded the Takamura Kōtarō Prize (高村光太郎賞受賞) and the pope bestowed the Order of St. Gregory the Great on him in 1964. For the latter sculpture he received the Nakahara-Teijirō-Prize (中原悌二郎賞) in 1972.

In addition to his work as an artist Funakoshi worked as a lecturer in his later life as well. From 1967 to 1980 he was a professor at the Tokyo University of the Arts (東京藝術大学, Tōkyō Geijutsu Daigaku) and from 1980 to 1983 at the Tama Art University (多摩美術大学, Tama bijutsu daigaku). After his retirement in 1983 he became an honorary professor at the Tokyo University of the Arts. In 1987 he suffered a stroke, which forced him to switch to his left hand for his future art work. Funakoshi died in 2002 in Tokyo at the age of 89.

Among other well known works of Funakoshi are the sculptures Spring and the Statue of Tatsuko. For Spring he received the Hasegawa-Hitoshi-Memorial-Prize and it was installed on the Heimai bridge in Kushiro in 1977. The Statue of Tatsuko is golden bronze statue located at the shore of Lake Tazawa, where it was unveiled on April 12, 1968.

The sculptor Katsura Funakoshi is his son.
