= Joryū Gaka Kyōkai =

Japanese arts organization

Joryū Gaka Kyōkai (女流画家協会, Association of Women Painters) is a prominent exhibition society for Japanese women artists that was founded in 1947 by the painters Setsuko Migishi, Yuki Katsura, Eiko Fujikawa, and others. Inspired by the new, equal opportunities awarded Japanese women after World War II, and instigated by the lack of exhibition opportunities for women artists, the exhibition society aimed – and still aims today – to elevate the works of women artists and provide an entry point for new artists.

When the group was first established, Migishi was the primary voice and leader of the group. She insisted that it would be different and independent from established dantai, or exhibition societies, in the Japanese art world. Joryū Gaka Kyōkai was meant to be a "merger" of women artists from all spectrums of the art world, rather than just another exhibition society. In the same vein, rather than advocate a specific ideology, philosophy, or style, Migishi emphasized "pure art" that functioned autonomously from established societies and systems – whether artistic or political.

Today, Joryū Gaka Kyōkai's primary vehicle for promoting women artists is its large, annual juried salon that display around 400 selected works primarily submitted by its members and affiliates. Since Migishi's leadership, Joryū Gaka Kyōkai has always accepted artworks in all styles, and thus has never had a unified aesthetic or style. However, because many of the founding members and current committee members are well-known yōga artists (artists working in "Western-style painting," primarily in oil), many of the works exhibited in their shows are yōga works.

== Background and establishment ==
Two exhibitions of works by women artists opened prior to the establishment of Joryū Gaka Kyōkai, and instigated its formation: Nihon Joryū Bijutsuka Kyōkai-ten at Mitsukoshi in Nihonbashi in 1945, and Gendai Joryū Gaka-ten at Hokusoh Gallery in 1946. During the latter exhibition, artists Setsuko Migishi and Eiko Fujikawa devised the idea of a combined exhibition society for women that drew its members from across the entire Japanese art world. Joryū Gaka Kyōkai was officially founded in February 1947 by eleven artists: Eiko Fujikawa, Yuki Katsura, Setsuko Migishi, Motoko Morita, Yoshie Nakada, Miyuki Nakatani, Yoneko Saeki, Fumiko Saiga, Hamae Sakurai, Etsu Sakurai, Yoko Tōyama. Its first exhibition, which also opened in February 1947, included 73 members who hailed from various yōga (Western-style painting) exhibition societies. An addition 12 members joined by the time of the second annual exhibition. By the early 1950s, the society numbered over 100 members, and the exhibitions were juried, awarding prizes.

The founding members of Joryū Gaka Kyōkai were already accomplished artists, and had independently participated in other exhibition societies before World War II. Yuki Katsura, for example, was affiliated with the Nika-kai (Second Section Society). Migishi had exhibited with the Dokuritsu Bijutsu Kyōkai (Association of Independent Artists), but was unable to join as an official member because she was a woman. In 1939, she became a member of the Shinseisakuha Kyōkai (New Creators' Association). The new postwar constitution of Japan, implemented in 1947, extended women the right to vote and the declaration of equal rights with men. The promise of these new opportunities created a broader sense of hope among women, including among artists who were women. At the same time, in the early postwar period, there were still few exhibition opportunities open to women, and women artists overall received very little recognition compared to their male counterparts. A dissatisfaction with this disconnect helped fuel the creation of Joryū Gaka Kyōkai.

== Principles ==
=== Membership and style ===
Joryū Gaka Kyōkai was established with two goals: to elevate art by female artists, and to provide a gateway for the success of new female artists through their exhibitions. In keeping with these original goals, the two qualifications for exhibiting works with Joryū Gaka Kyōkai are that one must be a woman, and that the work must never have been exhibited before.

From the beginning, Joryū Gaka Kyōkai was open to artists working in any style, with any political affiliation. It therefore never had a unified style or aesthetic. However, because three of its founding members (Migishi, Morita, and Etsu Sakurai) were graduates of the yōga (Western-style painting) division at the prestigious women's art school, Joshi Bijutsu Senmon Gakkō (today, Joshi Bijutsu Daigaku, or Joshibi University of Art and Design). As a result, even today, many of the exhibition society's members are graduates of Joshibi and work in the yoga style. The oldest member of the society today, Kazuko Irie, is also a graduate of the yōga division at Joshibi.

=== "Daidō danketsu" ===
Joryū Gaka Kyōkai is best defined as an exhibition society (団体, dantai). Historically, dating back to the early 20th century, dantai were art associations whose activities revolved around annual membership exhibitions and annual juried exhibitions. Dantai, however, often expanded to include other activities such as study groups, networking opportunities, and journal publications. By the postwar period, however, dantai started to be seen as academic and old-fashioned, and artists increasingly participated in more casual collectives that, rather than focusing on formal exhibitions, instead created collaborative and unconventional artworks. Examples of these more casual postwar collectives include groups such as Jikken Kōbō and Neo Dada Organizers.

Migishi, one of the founding artists of Joryū Gaka Kyōkai, belonged to the modernist, anti-academic faction of the art world (known as 在野 zaiya). As a result, she was adamant that this particular exhibition society would function not as a traditional dantai, but as a so-called daidō danketsu (大同団結 "agglomeration," or "merger") of female artists from the entire spectrum of the Japanese art world. Despite connections to other exhibition societies and associations, Joryū Gaka Kyōkai were meant to be independent and focus on "the presentation of pure art." The desire to separate Joryū Gaka Kyōkai from established dantai reveals Migishi's desire for innovation, yet it is worth noting that in practice, Joryū Gaka Kyōkai continues to this day to follow most of the prescribed activities of a dantai. Its activities revolve around annual exhibitions, it inaugurated a research study group after its 22nd exhibition, and after its 52nd exhibition, it introduced an affiliate system for artists to facilitate further networking opportunities.

=== "Pure art" ===
Joryū Gaka Kyōkai's early separation from dantai, its focus on "pure art," and its disinterest in stating any political affinities was also heavily influenced by Migishi's experience and art philosophy. In contrast with more politically active women's art associations, such as the Fujin Minshū Kurabu (Women's Democratic Association), Migishi believed that art should be independent and autonomous, with no political motivations. She therefore did not believe in tying art to the establishment, but equally frowned upon the political activities of the left-wing avant-garde. Some scholars believe that Migishi's separation of art and politics was deeply influenced by the war, when most art had acted in service of the government and political interests.

Despite providing an important platform for female artists, which inherently expanded the male-dominated art world, Migishi also held a fairly elitist view of artists' role in society, claiming that the artist was an independent genius separate from the masses. Her vision of gender equality involved elevating women artists to the same elite status as men.

Although Joryū Gaka Kyōkai no longer holds this stance officially, the works exhibited in recent exhibitions continue to be primarily oil paintings – while not inherently apolitical, the focus on this older medium suggests a more conservative view of contemporary art.

== Reception and influence ==
Despite the critical acclaim of several of the founding members, most notably Migishi and Yuki Katsura, Joryū Gaka Kyōkai's exhibitions received lukewarm critical reception, with early critics claiming that art was a matter of the "individual" and that the group itself did not do much to elevate women artists as a whole. While it was not the only women's art group established after World War II, it is one of the longest surviving ones in the Japanese art world. Joryū Gaka Kyōkai continues to maintain a robust membership, and its exhibitions have received coverage alongside other exhibition societies. Moreover, it remains an important entry point for new female artists, particularly those that study at and graduate from Joshibi.

== Recent activities ==
Joryū Gaka Kyōkai continues to organize annual exhibitions, run a research group, and publish newsletters. In 2022, it will open its 75th annual exhibition. Its annual exhibition is still a juried show involving around 70-80 committee members, 130 members, and over 1000 works submitted (of which about 400 are selected). The exhibition society remains one of the most prominent women's exhibition societies in Japan, and reviews of its annual exhibition appear in most major art publications, giving the exhibitors and award winners major publicity.
