= Yellowstone Art Museum =

Art museum in Billings, Montana, US

Coordinates: 45.7858°N 108.5071°W

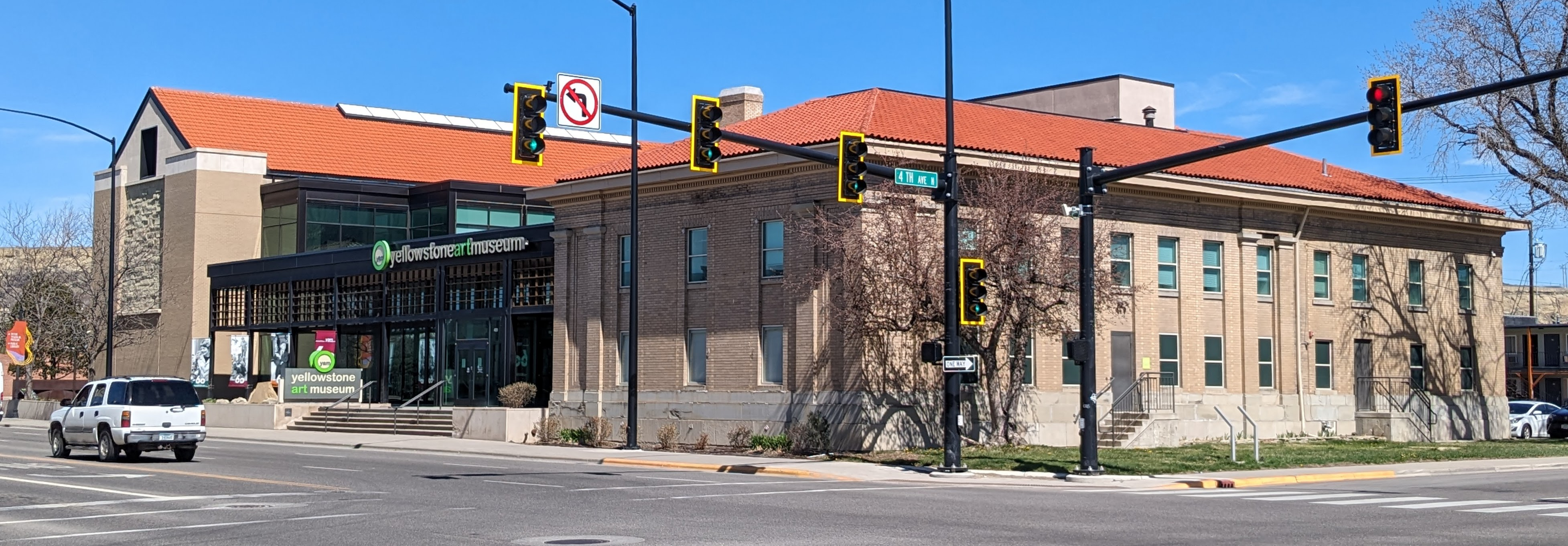
- Viewed from southwest, 2024
- Established: October 1964
- Location: Billings, Montana
- Type: Contemporary art museum

The Yellowstone Art Museum (YAM) in downtown Billings, Montana, United States, is the largest contemporary art museum in Montana.

== History and mission ==
The Yellowstone Art Center (now the Yellowstone Art Museum, or YAM) opened in October 1964 in the former Yellowstone County Jail. The construction of the county jail in 1884 was the first act of the newly instituted Yellowstone County government. It began as a small red brick structure. The partial basement of the jail functioned as storage, while the upper two floors served as cell blocks. In 1916, the county constructed additions to the west and north. In spite of Montana's location in the Wild West, only one hanging, in 1918, is known to have taken place at the Yellowstone County Jail.

Operating in a region where the established museums emphasized Western genre art and historic artifacts, staff and volunteer leadership early on defined an alternate, wide-ranging mission. The goal was to develop a collection and programs that acknowledged the rich artistic practice occurring in the present. Today the YAM remains the only visual arts institution within an immense geographic area, which it serves with a very active program of changing exhibitions in the main galleries, adjunct programs for adults, curriculum-based art education, and community events and festivals. The YAM's Annual Art Auction, begun in 1969, is the earliest contemporary art auction in a region that now boasts dozens that emulate the YAM. Summerfair, begun in 1979, was also the region's first outdoor arts & crafts fair and holds its lead as one of the region's finest.

== Collections and exhibitions ==
Pride in the growing permanent collection (now numbering over 7,400 works of historic and contemporary regional art), has grown steadily as the YAM has matured. A concerted effort has been made to collect work from outstanding regional artists ranging from the internationally celebrated Rudy Autio, John Buck, Deborah Butterfield, Isabelle Johnson, Richard Notkin, Jaune Quick-to-See Smith, Ted Waddell, and Patrick Zentz, to lesser-known and emerging artists. At the time the museum began to collect, these artists were not represented as a group in any Montana museum. The popularity and growth of the "Montana Collection" has exceeded expectations. The acquisition of the Virginia Snook Collection, the largest gathering of the work of cowboy writer and illustrator Will James, has given the collection another dimension. The estate of Isabelle Johnson, a pioneering Montana modernist, is also represented.

The YAM holds hundreds of works in its Poindexter Collection of New York Abstract Expressionism, including the works of Nell Blaine, Earl Kerkam, Franz Kline, Willem de Kooning, Jules Olitski, and Teiji Takai.

== Expansion and education ==
In 2009, the YAM was proud to be the Montana recipient of a gift of 50 works of minimalist and conceptual art from the internationally significant collection of Herbert and Dorothy Vogel. The Vogel gift—50 Works for 50 States—transpired under the auspices of the National Gallery of Art and involved the selection of one institution per state to receive a gift of 50 works. The Peter Norton Family Christmas Project Collection ensures that several internationally important artists (for example, Yinka Shonibare and Takashi Murakami) are represented in the collection.

In 1995, the YAM (then the Yellowstone Art Center) received the Montana Governor's Award for Service to the Arts. This recognition of the institution's statewide importance underscored the fact that the museum had outgrown its facility. Expansion plans and a capital campaign were launched. The campaign was a success: $6.2 million was raised primarily from and through the local community. In February 1998, the newly renamed Yellowstone Art Museum reopened its doors after two years of renovation and new construction. Its new facility was designed to protect its collections and display them in the most inspiring and meaningful way possible. Following its 1998 expansion, the Yellowstone Art Museum increased its exhibition and collection space and continued to expand its regional and national programming.

Growth has not stopped since reopening the expanded facility. Temporary exhibitions include local, national, and international arts. Education is a key focus; class and workshop programs are coordinated to relate to temporary exhibitions, or are stand-alone. In 2003, 2007, and 2010, the YAM received three-year grants from the federal Institute of Museum and Library Services (IMLS) in support of its art education programs, both on-site and outreach. Lectures featuring nationally known contemporary artists and critics, gallery talks, and special events are the main programs for the adult audience. In addition, a Young Artists' Gallery, established in 2006 in a large space that is free to the public at all times, features work by artists under 18 who are part of the YAM's school partnership programs. The Raven's Café d'Art opened in 2010 and has gained a reputation as a site for excellent, satisfying fare.

== Visible Vault ==
In 2003, the Montana-based Charles M. Bair Family Trust, recognizing that the YAM's own permanent collection had grown faster than expected and that the YAM needed to expand storage, made a grant to the YAM in 2005 to purchase the warehouse at 505 North 26th Street, with the intention that it be converted into high quality, expanded collection storage space. In 2006, the YAM entered into an agreement with the Charles M. Bair Family Trust that would result in a $2.15 million grant upon the YAM's raising $1 million in new capital and endowment gifts and pledges. The YAM achieved 147% of the goal by the deadline of 31 December 2007 and used the Bair Trust's challenge grant as the launching point for another major fundraising campaign. In 2007 a two-phased $17 million Expansion Campaign began. One result of this campaign was the YAM's innovative Visible Vault, which opened in August 2010. It is a publicly accessible art storage facility that houses the permanent collection in an open, visible fashion. The facility also includes an artist-in-residence studio. Artists-in-residence have included Tracy Linder, Brian Keith Scott, Brooke Atherton, Carol Spielman, John Pollock and Bently Spang. The Yellowstone Art Museum is one of only a handful of art museums in the country that have placed their entire collection storage areas on public view.
