= Yuki Katsura =

Japanese avant-garde artist (1913–1991)

- Katsura at her art studio, ca. 1955
- Born: 10 October 1913; Tokyo, Japan
- Died: 5 February 1991 (aged 77); Tokyo, Japan
- Known for: visual art
- Movement: Abstract Expressionism

Yuki Katsura (桂ゆき, Katsura Yuki, also Katsura Yukiko, 10 October 1913 – 5 February 1991) was a Japanese artist whose career spanned from the prewar to the postwar eras. During her six-decade career, Katsura did not conform to one particular artistic genre or style, instead employing a variety of approaches including painting, mixed media collage, and caricature to depict a range of subjects using folkloric allegory, religious iconography, realism, and experiments into abstraction. She was trained in both Japanese and Western painting styles and traditions, which was a rare accomplishment for a woman of her time. Katsura engaged with subjects that responded to critical socio-political events in mid-century Japan, such as societal expectations for Japanese women, the militarization of Japan, the post-war occupation, the rise of nuclear power, and gender equality. Her diverse approaches, engagement with critical issues, and adherence to personal autonomy gained her critical acclaim; she has been called a "pioneer among women artists," and is considered influential to the genesis of the Japanese avant-garde before and after the Asia Pacific War.

Katsura has been the subject of several large museum retrospectives in Japan, including the Shimonoseki Municipal Museum of Art (1991); Ibaraki Prefectural Museum of Modern Art (1998); and the Museum of Contemporary Art, Tokyo (2013). While she is very well-known in her native Japan, Katsura was left out of the canonization of Japanese art and art market in a Western context for many years. In the 2010s, she became the subject of more curatorial and art historical interest and publications in English.

Katsura's artworks are included in the collections of the Museum of Modern Art, Kamakura & Hayama; Ohara Museum of Art; Itabashi Art Museum; the Museum of Contemporary Art Tokyo; the Yokohama Museum of Art; and the University of Arizona Museum of Art.

== Early life and education ==
Born into an upper-middle class family of samurai lineage during the Taishō Democracy in 1913, Katsura was raised in a conservative household that expected her to uphold Japan's traditional gender roles. However, she also absorbed the more individualistic mindset manifested in Western cultural products such as books and music brought home by Katsura's father, a professor of engineering at the Tokyo Imperial University who had received his education in Europe. Katsura had one younger brother, the novelist Katsura Hidezumi.

Katsura's desire to study Western-style oil painting (yōga) was rejected as it was considered an unacceptable pastime for women at the time. Instead, Katsura studiedJapanese style painting (Nihonga), which was considered a cultivated, ladylike pursuit for amateur "lady painters" (keishū gaka). In 1926, Katsura enrolled at a girls' high school. From the age of 12, she trained under renowned ink painter Shūho Ikegami, a specialist in Chinese bird and flower painting (kachōga). She was finally allowed to study oil painting when she was 17 years old, after a bout of tuberculosis, enrolling in the Tokyo ateliers of yōga painters Nakamura Ken'ichi and Okada Saburōsuke, but was disappointed when both men expected her to paint "feminine" subject matter, such as dolls and flowers. In 1933, she entered the Avant-Garde Yōga Research Institute (Abangyarudo Yōga Kenkyūjo) where she was able to study under the more radical Tsuguharu Fujita and Seiji Tōgō. She was able to begin experimenting with styles and approaches at her new school, as many of her teachers there, including Fujita and Tōgō, had been to Europe and were proponents of abstraction and Surrealism.

== Artistic approach ==
Despite the many challenges of being a female artist in Japan's male-dominated arts community, Katsura refused to be pigeonholed into any singular mode of expression throughout her career. She constantly searched for her own unique style, combining elements of realism, collage, assemblage, trompe-l'oeil, abstraction, and surrealism, destabilizing dominant traditions throughout her six-decade oeuvre and proclaiming that she must "resist Fauvism, resist Surrealism, and paint pictures that are no one's but my own."

Katsura has largely been categorized as having three primary styles: collage, detailed depiction of surface textures, and caricature. According to curator Naoko Seki of the 2013 "A Fable [ある寓話]" retrospective of Katsura's work at the Museum of Contemporary Art Tokyo Museum, these are the fundamental methods of Katsura's artistic expression; the comprehensive retrospective of her artwork at MOT was thus organized into these categories for the exhibition.

== Career before the war, 1933–1938 ==
During her time at the Avant-Garde Western Painting Research Institute, Katsura was exposed to new European art, including Dada, Surrealism, and Fauvism. Having long been a "collecto-maniac," Katsura began to incorporate unconventional subjects into her work in the early 1930s, such as crumpled leaves, cork shavings, wood grain, rope, and Japanese kasuri fabric. Katsura claimed that cork "was a motif that touched her soul" and a "collage technique that no one [else had] imitated." The artist sought to directly engage with the textuality of these material experiments, thus establishing herself as a pioneer in Japanese modern art. These inventive explorations allowed Katsura to make a name for herself in art circles, and by the age of 22 she had held two solo exhibitions in Tokyo—the first with the support of painter Ebihara Kinosuke at Kindai Gallery in 1935, and the second at Galerie Nichido in 1938, upon recommendation of her teacher Fujita Tsuguharu.

Katsura participated in annual Nika-ten exhibitions of the Nika-kai (Second Section Society) from 1935 to 1943. During this period, Katsura combined mixed media collage and realism to investigate the position of women and female creativity within a patriarchal society, such as Letter (1936), Diary (1938/1979), Genji (1938/1979), and Crown (1939/1979). She hoped to "paint pictures according to [her] own self as a woman without imitating anyone."

In 1938, Katsura was invited to help Yoshihara Jirō and Yamaguchi Takeo, among others, to establish the Kyūshitsu-kai (Ninth Room Society), as a more experimentally-minded offshoot of the Nika-kai, gathering younger artists who had been placed in Room 9 of the Tokyo Metropolitan Art Museum at the time of Nika's annual salon. In 1940, Katsura and Yoshihara were both commended as being at the forefront of Japanese abstract art by the English-language newspaper the Japan Times.

Katsura stopped using cork when the war began, but returned to it in the late 1970s, showing many cork assemblages at her major solo exhibition, "Yuki Katsura: Works from the 1978–1979" at Tokyo Gallery in 1979. Many of Katsura's prewar artworks, especially her cork-based compositions, were destroyed in the wartime devastation of Tokyo.

=== Notable works ===
- Sun (Cork), 日なた (コルク) (1935)
- Letter, 手紙 (1936)
- Diary, 日記 (1938/1979)
- Genji, 源氏 (1938/1979)
- Soil, 土 (1939)

== During the Asia Pacific War, 1938–1945 ==
Katsura continued to paint as much as she could during the Asia Pacific War, though materials quickly became scarce and the state's co-option of Japan's leading artists to contribute to wartime propaganda was imminent. In March 1938, the National Mobilization Law went into effect, marking the beginning of Japan's total war initiative that mobilized civilians into the aid of the Imperial war effort. That same year, Katsura produced Human I and Human II, two paintings that Namiko Kunimoto has analyzed as "refuti[ng] the rising tides of nationalistic aggression." Both paintings including formless bodies, lined up as if being disciplined, and also a negative depiction of one of Japan's national icons, Mount Fuji. Kunimoto has argued that Katsura used zoomorphic folklore as a way to avoid political conversion and continue making artworks during the war. By painting shapeless bodies while her peers were converting to militarism and painting propagandic war paintings (sensō-ga) that glorified the war, Katsura seemed to be taking a political stance and rebelling against the state. In 1940, Katsura exhibited Human I and Human II at the Kyūshitsu-kai exhibition. That same year, she also turned down fellow female artist Hasegawa Haruko's invitation to organize the women's wing of the Army Art Association (Rikugun Bijutsu Kyōkai).

However, in 1944 Katsura did take part in the production of a large-scale painting in collaboration with the Joryū Bijutsu Kyōkai (Women's Art Organization), entitled The Painting of All Laboring Women in the Empire during the Great East Asian War (1944); it was exhibited at the Military Art Exhibition in Tokyo, where it glorified women's aid in the war effort and "emphasized the role of the female body in relation to the nation." Some argue that Katsura's participation in this project was an opportunity for her to satirize the initiative, but she was also one of the women that contributed artwork to the controversial exhibition attempting to motivate parents to send their underage sons to the war (Katsura contributed a postcard, After Maneuvers [Enshū o oete]). The exhibition "Fighting Child Soldiers," was not mandated by the government.

=== Notable works ===
- Human I, 人間一 (1938)
- Human II, 人間二 (1938)
- The Painting of All Laboring Women in the Empire during the Great East Asian War [Daitōasen kōkoku fujo kaidō no zu] (1944)

== Career in the immediate postwar period, 1945–1956 ==
After Japan's defeat in the war, Katsura retained her prewar affiliations with the Nika-kai and Kyūshitsu-kai, while also co-founding the Association of Women Painters (Joryū Gaka Kyōkai) with Setsuko Migishi in 1946, a group which provided exhibition opportunities for women artists who worked in various styles. She also became an organizing secretary of the short-lived Japan Avant-garde Artists Club (Nihon Abangyarudo Bijutsuka Kurabu)in 1947, a group which contributed to the regrouping of significant artists after the war and held two Modern Art exhibitions with the backing of the Yomiuri Shimbun. In 1950, Katsura was recommended as a full member of the Nika-kai, and served as a juror until 1956.

In 1948, Katsura participated in the literary-artistic group, Yoru no Kai (Night Society), organized by renowned surrealist artist Tarō Okamoto to foster ties between avant-garde art and literature. Yoru no Kai included prominent Marxists such as along with Abe Kōbō, Haniya Yutaka, Hanada Kiyoteru, and others. She also created many illustrations for Hanada during these years. While Katsura carried on with her experiments in abstraction and surrealism, her closer involvement with literature likely prompted her to engage with writing as another important form of expression, while also turning to the folkloric traditions of Japan for inspirations and shifting or refiguring them as a form of resistance.

Starting in the late 1940s, Katsura explored ideas that were more political and critical of society, such as female liberation, patriotism and nationalism, and the political nature of the body. Her rising interest in folklore, mythology, and religious iconography also aligned with the general quest of the postwar Japanese society of reconsidering what a national identity entailed. She made many works that strongly critiqued society at this time, such as Piling Up (1951), Resistance (1952), March (1952), History of Mankind (1953), Women's Day (1953), Towering Rage (1953), Human and Fish (1954), and We’re all Suffering (1954). Piling Up (1951), which depicts a variety of textural objects piled precariously atop a Japanese-style house, has been read as a statement about Katsura's decision to move away from her parents' home the same year—the painting symbolizes her move towards independence as the promises of female equality were on the rise in Japan with signing of a new constitution. Similarly, Namiko Kunimoto analyzed Women's Day (1953), asserting that Katsura's painting demonstrates an ambiguous reaction to the promises of female equality, writing that it "conveys the double registers of hope and confusion predominant in the postwar period."

Human and Fish and We’re all Suffering, both painted in 1954, are considered to be two of Katsura's most overtly political works as they were painted following the Daigo Fukuryū Maru (Lucky Dragon) nuclear incident that resulted in the irradiation of 23 Japanese fishermen caused failed American Castle Bravo test at Bikini Atoll.

=== Notable works ===
- Piling Up, 積んだり (1951)
- History of Mankind, 人間の歴史 (1951)
- Still Life, 静物 (1951)
- Towering Rage, 怒髪天をつく (1953)
- Man and Fish, 人と魚 (1954)

== International travels, 1956–1961 ==
Between 1956 and 1961, Katsura moved away from Japan for the first time, living in Paris, France, and New York City, USA, as well as spending several months in the village of Bambari in the Central African Republic. The sudden decision to leave Japan resulted from the artist's will to reconsider her artistic identity as she had a growing sense that her life as a professional artist had become too dependent on the established construct of art institutions in Japan—she longed for fresh experiences abroad where she could "become a blank sheet of paper [and] confront the unknown." She spent two years traveling and exhibiting in Europe with Paris as her home base, and even displayed a painting in a group show next to works by Pablo Picasso and Jean Arp. She then spent three months living in Bambari, where she took many photographs and participated in big game hunting. All of these activities were highly unusual for an unmarried Japanese woman at the time.

In June 1956, Katsura moved to New York City, where she set up her studio and experimented with abstraction and materiality for almost three years, using washi paper and oil paint to create large-scale mixed media collages. She employed a variety of approaches to coloration and the layering of material and relief in these works, and they were quite well received both in the U.S.A. and in Japan. Katsura came in contact with a young Yayoi Kusama (Katsura was nearly 20 years older); in 1960 they both exhibited their work at Gres Gallery in Washington D.C., alongside Kawabata Minoru, Okada Kenzō, Onosato Toshinobu, and Yamaguchi Takeo. Katsura's works in the exhibition were described by a local art critic as having "great delicacy and strength." While living in New York, Katsura was also included in the "11th PREMIO LISSONE International Art Exhibition," held in Lissone, Italy, in 1959, alongside artists such as Kawabata Minoru, Shiraga Kazuo, Fukushima Hideko, Motonaga Sadamasa, and Yves Klein.

Katsura continued to incorporate the wrinkling, textural quality of the layered washi paper into many of her later works, even when she returned to folkloric caricature and zoomorphic subjects upon her return to Japan. She wrote about her experiences living in New York City in many letters sent to her younger brother, relaying how she brushed shoulders with various figures of the European and American avant-garde art world, and worked at a lamp shade shop and as an anma masseuse to survive the difficult conditions that faced artists in 1960s New York. Art journalist Segui Shinichi poetically described Katsura's activities abroad in the catalogue of her 1961 solo exhibition at Tokyo Gallery:

"Among my fellow countrymen who have gone abroad,

I don’t think there was ever anyone else who held true to themselves as firmly as [Katsura].

From the ashes of Paris to the hustle and bustle of New York,

She was always able to stand precisely upon her own feet."

=== Notable works ===
- Work, 作品 (1958–1961)
- Four Canvases (1960)
- TWO ORANGE FORMS (1960)
- Millipede, 千本足 (1962)

== Return to Japan and later works, 1961–1991 ==
Katsura returned to Japan in 1961, following the death of her father Benzō. She continued to exhibit her work in major venues around Japan following her return to Japan; she almost immediately held a major solo exhibition at Tokyo Gallery in 1961, where she unveiled her experiments with abstraction in Japan for the first time.

Throughout the next three decades, Katsura continued her critical engagement with politics, materiality, and form. From 1963 to 1964, she illustrated the serialized translation of James Baldwin's novel Another Country for the Asahi Journal, taking on themes of interracial relationships and homosexuality that were considered highly taboo in Japan.

Katsura returned to cartoon-like social satire in the late 1960s, with works that employed mixed-media collage and meticulous representations of accumulated newspaper and banknote fragments depicting people as subhuman creatures drowning in layers of information and commodities." She won the highest award at the 1966 "Contemporary Japanese Art Exhibition" in Tokyo for Gonbe and Crow (1966), a painting that she described as a self-portrait of her two selves in confrontation—a hardworking and passive peasant farmer "Gonbe" dressed in agrarian fabrics and the critical crows him poking at him from below with their sharp beaks. She also published four memoirs, documenting her travels and life experiences abroad, as well as her perspectives on Japanese folklore and folkloric caricature.

While continuing to paint, Katsura also turned towards more sculptural works in her later life, returning to non-art assemblage using cork in an Arte Povera–like alternative to painting in the late 1970s, and experiments with soft sculpture in the 1980s, using bright red silk fabric traditionally used for the inside of women's kimono to wrap around and distort various objects deemed by society to be "feminine."

== Legacy ==
In 2023 her work was included in the exhibition Action, Gesture, Paint: Women Artists and Global Abstraction 1940-1970 at the Whitechapel Gallery in London.

=== Notable works ===
- Gonbe and Crow, ゴンベとカラス (1966)
- Mask, マスク (1970)
- Fox and Badger, 狐と狸 (1973)
- Adam and Eve, アダムとエブ (1983)
- Sweet Potatoes, あまいも (1987)

== Publications ==
- A Woman Alone Enters a Primitive Village: Memoirs from Africa and America [Onna hitori genshi bu — raku ni hairu: afurika, amerika no taikenki], 1962
- The Fox's Journey [Kitsune no Dairyokō], 1974
- The New Fox's Journey [Shin Kitsune no Dairyokō], 1974
- Sequel to the Fox's Journey [Zoku Kitsune no Dairyokō], 1974
