= Shunsuke Matsumoto =

Japanese painter (1912–1948)

- 松本竣介
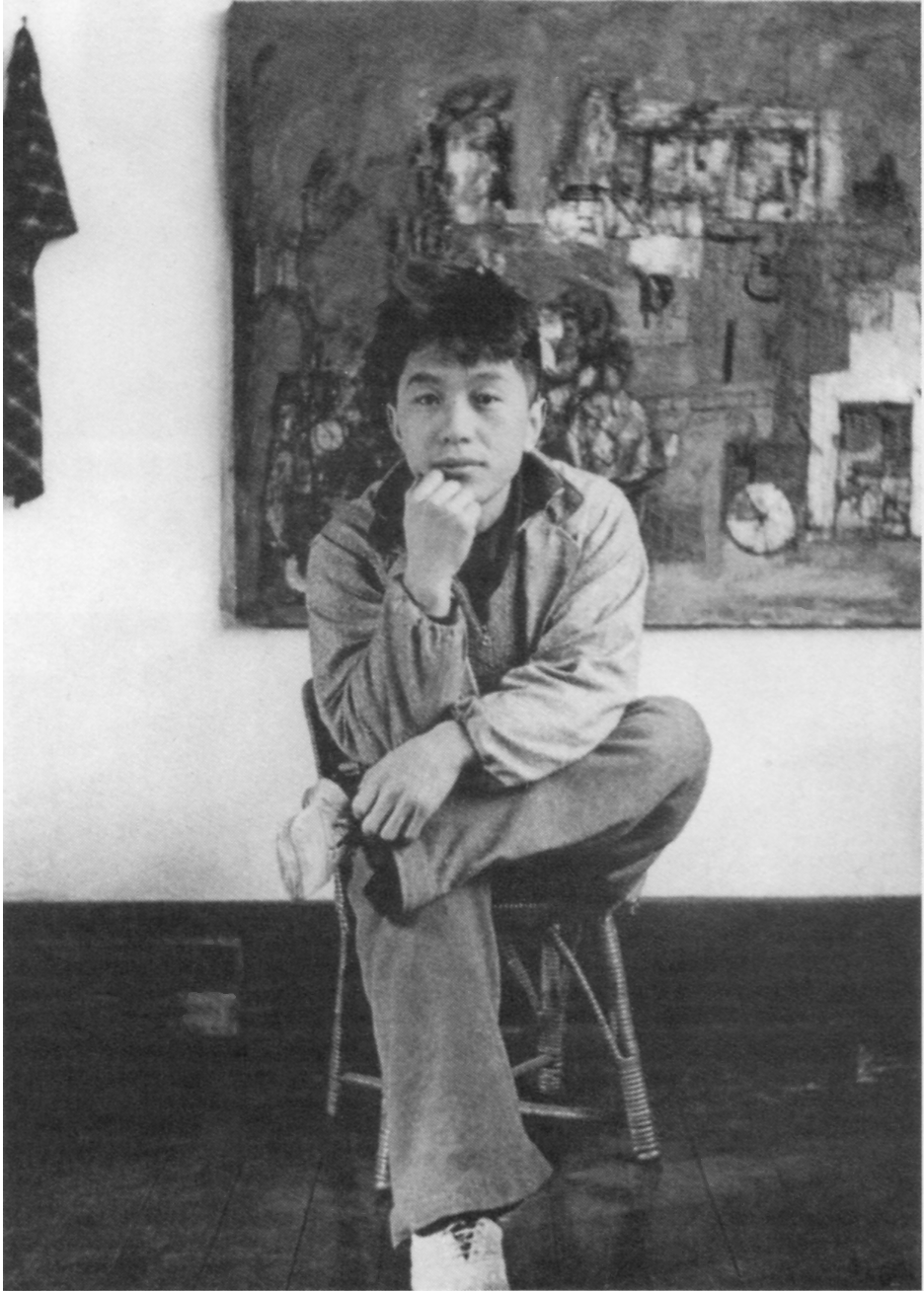
- Shunsuke Matsumoto at his atelier in Shimoochiai (1940s)
- Born: Satō Shunsuke (俊介); April 19, 1912
- Died: June 8, 1948 (aged 36); Tokyo
- Known for: Western painting
- Notable work: Machi 1936

Shunsuke Matsumoto (松本 竣介, Matsumoto Shunsuke; 1912–1948) was a Japanese painter, who primarily painted in the Yōga ("Western painting") style. Matsumoto is known for his urban landscapes. His works can be divided into two series: those depicting anonymous urban landscapes and people in cold blue tones in a montage style, and those depicting Tokyo and Yokohama landscapes in dull brown tones. For a short period between 1947 and 1948, Matsumoto also painted Cubist-style works.

== Biography ==
=== Early life and education in Iwate Prefecture (1912–1929) ===
Matsumoto was born on April 19, 1912, in Shibuya, Tokyo as Shunsuke Satō (佐藤俊介). Matsumoto was the second son of father Katsumi and mother Hana, and had an elder brother, Akira, who was two years older than him. Before his marriage in 1936, Matsumoto's maiden name was Satō (he took the surname Matsumoto after marrying Teiko Matsumoto 松本禎子). Matsumoto moved to Hanamaki, Iwate Prefecture, when he was two years old due to his father's participation in the apple wine brewing business, and later to his father's hometown Morioka, Iwate Prefecture when he was ten. Matsumoto attended Iwate Normal Elementary School (岩手師範付属小学校), graduated at the top of his class in 1925, and entered Morioka Junior High School (岩手県立盛岡中学校) with the highest grades. The day before the school entrance ceremony, he had a headache, but pushed himself to attend the ceremony and the next morning he contracted cerebrospinal meningitis which caused the loss of his hearing. He was discharged from the hospital in early autumn and started school in October 1925. The future sculptor Yasutake Funakoshi was among his schoolmates in the same grade.

Matsumoto’s father, Katsumi, wanted to send his son to the Military Training School, but when Matsumoto’s deafness cut off his path to a military career, Katsumi decided to let his son become an engineer as he wished, and bought Matsumoto a camera and equipment for developing pictures. Matsumoto was enthusiastic about it for a while, but soon lost interest in cameras. At that time, Matsumoto’s elder brother Akira bought a set of oil painting tools and sent them to his younger brother, leading Matsumoto to start painting. From the summer of his second year of junior high school, Matsumoto became passionate about sketching, and in his third year he created a painting club at school. He gradually began to aspire to become a painter.

=== Pacific Painting Institute and Ikebukuro Montparnasse (1929–1933) ===
In March 1929, Matsumoto dropped out of Morioka Junior High School in his third year and moved to Tokyo. Matsumoto’s primary school teacher, Mizuhiko Sato, was working at Jiyū Gakuen, which was then located in Ikebukuro, and with his support Matsumoto was able to rent a house next door to Sato. From there, he began attending the Pacific Art Institute (太平洋画会研究所; later renamed the Pacific Art School 太平洋美術学校). At the time, there was an ongoing conflict between the students and the management over tuition fees. As a result, in the late autumn of 1930 the institute changed its name, re-starting as an art school. The shift to an art school led many students, including Aimitsu, Chōzaburō Inoue, and Masao Tsuruoka (whom Matsumoto did not know at the time) to leave, but Matsumoto chose to remain at the school. At the Pacific Art School, Matsumoto received training from Gorō Tsuruta.

At the time he was attending the Pacific Art School, Matsumoto was hugely interested in Modigliani's art and life. Matsumoto formed a group called Akamame (赤荳), which is a Japanese translation of the name of a girl in the biographical novel of Modigliani, Les Montparnos, written by Georges Michel. With his fellow (mostly Marxist) artists at the Pacific Art School, Matsumoto also co-founded a group called the Pacific Modern Art Study Group (太平洋近代藝術研究会), and published a magazine called Sen (線 meaning "Line"; the first issue was published in September 1931). However, Matsumoto did not agree with the Marxist theory of art and Sen was terminated after two issues.

In 1932, he rented an atelier with his fellow artists in Ikebukuro, where many artists lived and worked, and formed an artistic community called Ikebukuro Montparnasse. At this time, he became romantically involved with a model, Masayo Iwamoto, but this caused a rift between the friends and the joint atelier was dissolved after five months. During the period of the joint atelier, he underwent a conscription examination in his hometown, but was exempted from military service because of his deafness. After the dissolution of the atelier, Matsumoto started living with his brother Akira.

=== Art of Life and marriage (1933–1936) ===
Matsumoto’s father Katsumi was originally a Christian, but converted to Nichiren Buddhism and later became a believer of Seichō no ie. Matsumoto’s elder brother Akira also became a believer of the Seichō no ie under the influence of his father's enthusiastic encouragement. Around 1930, Masaharu Taniguchi, the founder of the Seichō no ie, told Akira that he was going to publish an art magazine, Seimei no Geijutsu (生命の藝術; Art of Life) (first published in 1933), and Akira invited Matsumoto to take charge of its editing. However, Matsumoto was not initially keen on this offer, and it was not until three years later in 1933 that he agreed to edit the magazine. Together with Akira, Matsumoto began editing the Seimei no Geijutsu and continued until 1936. It was at this workplace that he met his future wife, Teiko Matsumoto.

In 1933, Matsumoto became acquainted with Aimitsu. In 1935, Matsumoto exhibited at the exhibition of the NOVA Art Association, founded by Masao Tsuruoka and others, and was immediately recommended as a full member of the association. In the autumn of the same year, Matsumoto went to a museum in Ueno to show Teiko his paintings that had been selected for the Nika Exhibition for the first time. There he first came into contact with the work of Hideo Noda, and was influenced for some time afterwards. The following year, in 1936, he exhibited City (Machi) at the Nika Exhibition, a work that was strongly influenced by Noda. When Hideo Noda died suddenly in January 1937, Matsumoto bought a collection of Noda's works published in a limited edition of 500 copies.

On 3 February 1936, Matsumoto and Teiko were married in the Tokyo Kaikan in accordance with the Seichō no ie ceremony style. At the beginning of the marriage, they lived in the household of Teiko’s family, but soon moved to another rented house, where they lived with their mother-in-law, Tsune, and two of Teiko's younger sisters (Yasuko and Eiko). The rented house was an elegant two-story Western-style house with an atelier. While working as an editor of Seimei no Geijutsu (Art of Life), Matsumoto was a member of Seichō no ie, but Matsumoto distanced himself when it was converted into a religious organisation, and he wrote a letter to Taniguchi to part ways with Seichō no ie. Around the same time, his father Katsumi, his elder brother Akira, his wife Teiko, and his mother-in-law Tsune also left Seichō no ie.

=== Miscellaneous Notes and first solo show (1936–1939) ===
After Matsumoto stopped editing Seimei no Geijutsu (Art of Life), he launched a new magazine by himself. In October 1936, he edited and published the first issue of this magazine, Zakkichō (雑記帳; Miscellaneous Notes), financed with the help of his brother Akira. It started with a first edition of 5,000 copies but sold very little and was reduced to a run of 3,000 copies. However, even that figure was no longer financially sustainable, and Miscellaneous Notes ended with the December 1937 issue (vol. 14). A number of well-known figures contributed to the Miscellaneous Notes. Writers included Katsuichirō Kamei, Haruo Satō, Shūzō Takiguchi, Sakutarō Hagiwara, Murō Saisei, Tatsuji Miyoshi, and Yojūrō Yasuda, while the members of Ikebukuro Montparnasse as well as painters Katsuzō Satomi, Seiji Tōgō, Tsuguharu Foujita and Sōtarō Yasui contributed articles and illustrations.

Meanwhile, his first child was born in April 1937, but born prematurely, the infant died the following day. At the beginning of 1939, a supporters' association for Matsumoto was set up to sell his paintings. Seiji Tōgō and Tamiji Kitagawa wrote letters of endorsement, but Matsumoto’s paintings did not sell well. Instead, he earned a living by working as an illustrator for magazines and producing murals for beauty salons and coffee shops run by his friends. In July 1939, his first son Kan was born, and in the summer of 1940, Matsumoto was awarded a special prize at the Nika Exhibition. In October of the same year, he held his first solo exhibition at the Nichidō Gallery in Ginza for three days where he exhibited 30 works.

=== The Living Painter (1941) ===
Probably at the very end of 1940, Saburō Asō visited Matsumoto’s studio with the January 1941 issue of the art magazine Mizue. The issue featured an 11-page roundtable discussion entitled “The National Defence State and Art: What Should Painters Do” (Kokubō kokka to bijutsu: Gaka wa nani o nasubeki ka). The speakers were Major Suzuki Kurazō (Army Information Section), Major Kunio Akiyama (Army Information Section), First Lieutenant Senkichirō Kuroda (Army Information Section), Takashi Kamigori (Mizue editor), and Hideo Araki (art critic). None of the participants were artists. The speakers attacked the strawman of pure art—art for art's sake—and demanded a new art that would be meaningful for the state and the Japanese race. Matsumoto read the issue and he and Asō spent a long time in Matsumoto’s studio talking secretly. The details of what he and Asō discussed at this time are unknown, as neither Asō nor Matsumoto gave details after the war. However, after Asō’s visit, Matsumoto approached the president of Mizue with a request to write a rebuttal, and the magazine agreed to publish a manuscript of 20 pages.

The manuscript was written over the course of a month and published in the April 1941 issue of Mizue under the title "Ikiteiru gaka" (Living Painter"). The title is thought to have been inspired by Tatsuzō Ishikawa's banned novel Ikiteiru heitai (The Living Soldier). Because of this printed rebuttal of the military authority, after the war, Matsumoto has long been regarded as a "painter of resistance." However, as is better known today due to recent scholarship, he was not against the totalitarian state policy itself and he did produce several propaganda posters during the war.

=== Painting Society of the New Man (1943–1945) ===
In the spring of 1943, Matsumoto visited Chōzaburō Inoue, who was living in Ikebukuro Montparnasse, to discuss the formation of a new artist group. Along with Inoue, Aimitsu, Masao Tsuruoka, Wasaburō Itozono, Gorō Ōno, Masaaki Terada, Saburō Asō, among others, Matsumoto formed the Painting Society of the New Man (Shinjin Gakai; 新人画会). The group held its first exhibition in April for ten days in a small gallery on the second floor of a music shop in Ginza, and Matsumoto exhibited five paintings in the show. The office of the Painting Society of the New Man was then set up in Matsumoto’s home. At the time, the art exhibitions predominantly featured war paintings, but at the Painting Society of the New Man exhibitions, only landscapes and portraits were exhibited. Because of this, after the war, the Painting Society of the New Man was sometimes described as the only group of anti-war painters in Japan. However, according to interviews with former members of the Painting Society of the New Man including Asō, Itozono, Inoue, Terada and others, there was no such anti-war statement shared among the group.

Matsumoto continued to actively exhibit work in and beyond the Painting Society of the New Man, even as the war dragged on: Matsumoto displayed three war propaganda posters in an exhibition in Iwate Prefecture in October 1943, participated in the Painting Society of the New Man's second exhibition held for six days in Ginza in November 1943, and then participated in the group's third exhibition at the Shiseidō Gallery in September 1944. For this third exhibition of the Painting Society of the New Man, Matsumoto changed character of his name from Shunsuke (俊介) to Shunsuke (竣介), a spelling he retained for the rest of his life. In September 1944, however, the Cabinet Intelligence Bureau decided to ban exhibitions other than those organized or co-organized by the Bijutsu Hōkokai (美術報国会), at which point exhibitions by the Painting Society of the New Man were no longer possible. In March 1945, when indiscriminate air raids on the Japanese mainland by the US military intensified, Matsumoto had his wife Teiko, his mother-in-law Tsune, and his eldest son Kan evacuated to Matsue, where his first daughter, Yōko, was born on April 10. Matsumoto, however, remained in Tokyo and on May 25 he came close to disaster when the Yamanote and Shimo-Ochiai areas in Tokyo were heavily bombed: only the area around Matsumoto’s home managed to escape damage.

=== After the war (1945–1948) ===
With the end of the war, exhibition opportunities began to open up again and in 1945, Matsumoto had a two-person exhibition with Yasutake Funakoshi at a department store in their hometown of Morioka. That October (1945), at a time when the debate about war responsibility was raging, Matsumoto submitted an article to the Asahi Newspaper entitled “An artist's conscience” (Geijutsuka no ryōshin). The article was not accepted, but in it he argued that the theme of war painting itself had a timeless universality. Around this time, Matsumoto was working with Saburō Asō and Yasutake Funakoshi on the idea of founding another new art group. Yet he was also being actively sought by other artist associations, with receiving membership invitations from Seiji Tōgō to join Second Section Society (Nika-kai), from Junkichi Mukai to join Action Art Association (Kōdō bijutsu kyōkai), and from Ichirō Fukuzawa to participate in the Art and Culture Association (Bijutsu bunka kyōkai).

Matsumoto declined all of these offers, but he continued to engage professional artists in active discussion independently while pushing forward with a busy exhibition schedule. In January 1946, Matsumoto sent a pamphlet to many painters containing an article he had written, entitled “Consulting with Artists from Across All of Japan” (Zennihon bijutsuka ni hakaru). In November 1946, Matsumoto held a three-person exhibition with Saburō Asō and Yasutake Funakoshi at the Nichidō Gallery in Ginza. Matsumoto later joined the Free Artists' Association (Jiyū bijutsuka kyōkai) together with Saburō Asō, Masao Tsuruoka, Chōzaburō Inoue, and others, and in June 1947 exhibited at the 1st Art Group Union Exhibition (Bijutsu dantai rengōten), the 11th Free Artists' Association exhibition in July, and in October at a three-person exhibition in Gifu Prefecture with Aso and Funakoshi. In February 1948, after the Free Artists' Association exhibition, Matsumoto told his wife Teiko of his intention to move to Paris, a decision that indicates his career-minded aspirations.

Alongside this active schedule, however, Matsumoto battled worsening health and other major life events. Matsumoto’s rib pain and asthma had begun to worsen around the time of his three-person Ginza show in November 1946. Then, during the three-person exhibition in Gifu in October 1947, his eldest daughter Yōko died of urinary poisoning, and in December Matsumoto himself fell ill with croup after catching a cold. He recovered in the beginning of 1948, and soon after, his second daughter Kyōko was born. In March, Matsumoto felt strong chest pains, but gave priority to the production of the 2nd Art Group Union Exhibition in May. His health deteriorated further, however, and he was unable to even bring the completed paintings to the exhibition venue himself, so they were brought in by others including his sisters-in-law. Matsumoto was ultimately unable to visit the exhibition, and on 24 May, Matsumoto’s friend Tetsurō Sawada brought him to a doctor at Keio Hospital because of a high fever. After examining him, the doctor told Matsumoto’s wife Teiko that he had tuberculosis. As Matsumoto and Teiko could not afford the cost of hospitalization, he rested at home, but his condition suddenly changed on the morning of June 7 and he died on the following day. Matsumoto died at the age of 36 on June 8, 1948, from heart failure aggravated by tuberculosis and bronchial asthma.

== Gallery ==
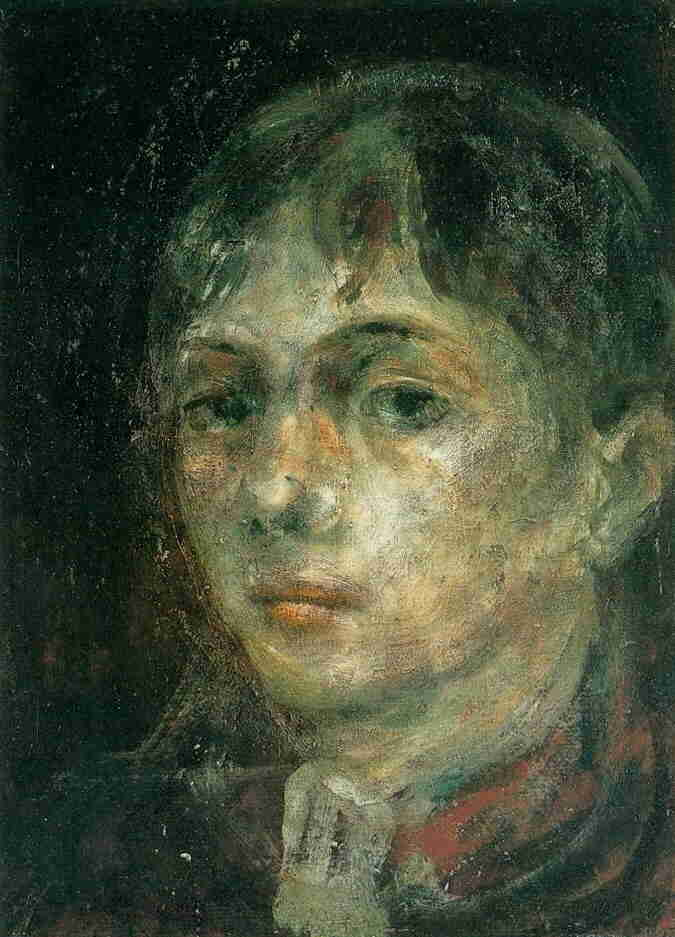
self-portrait (1941)

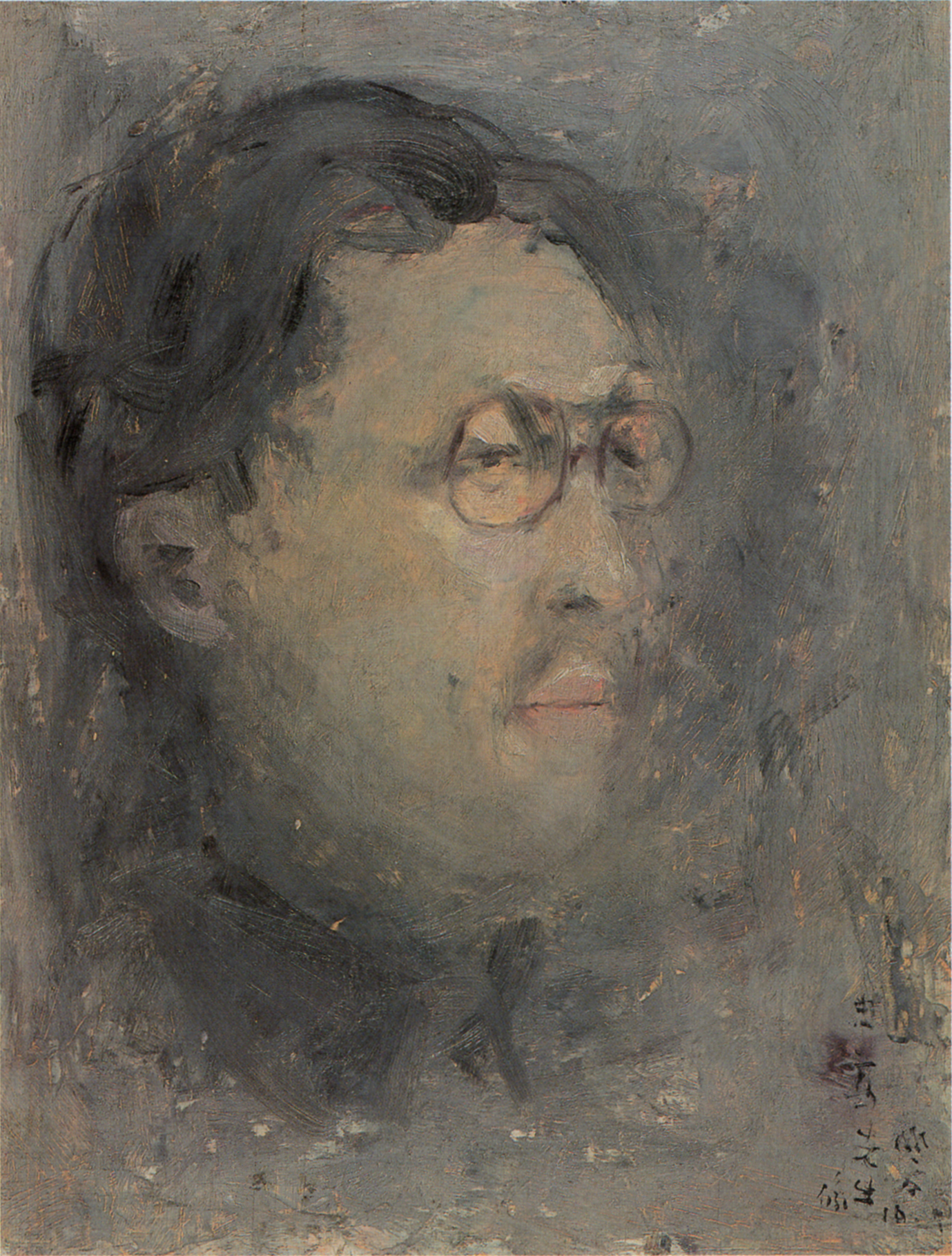
Portrait of Chuya Takahashi (1941)

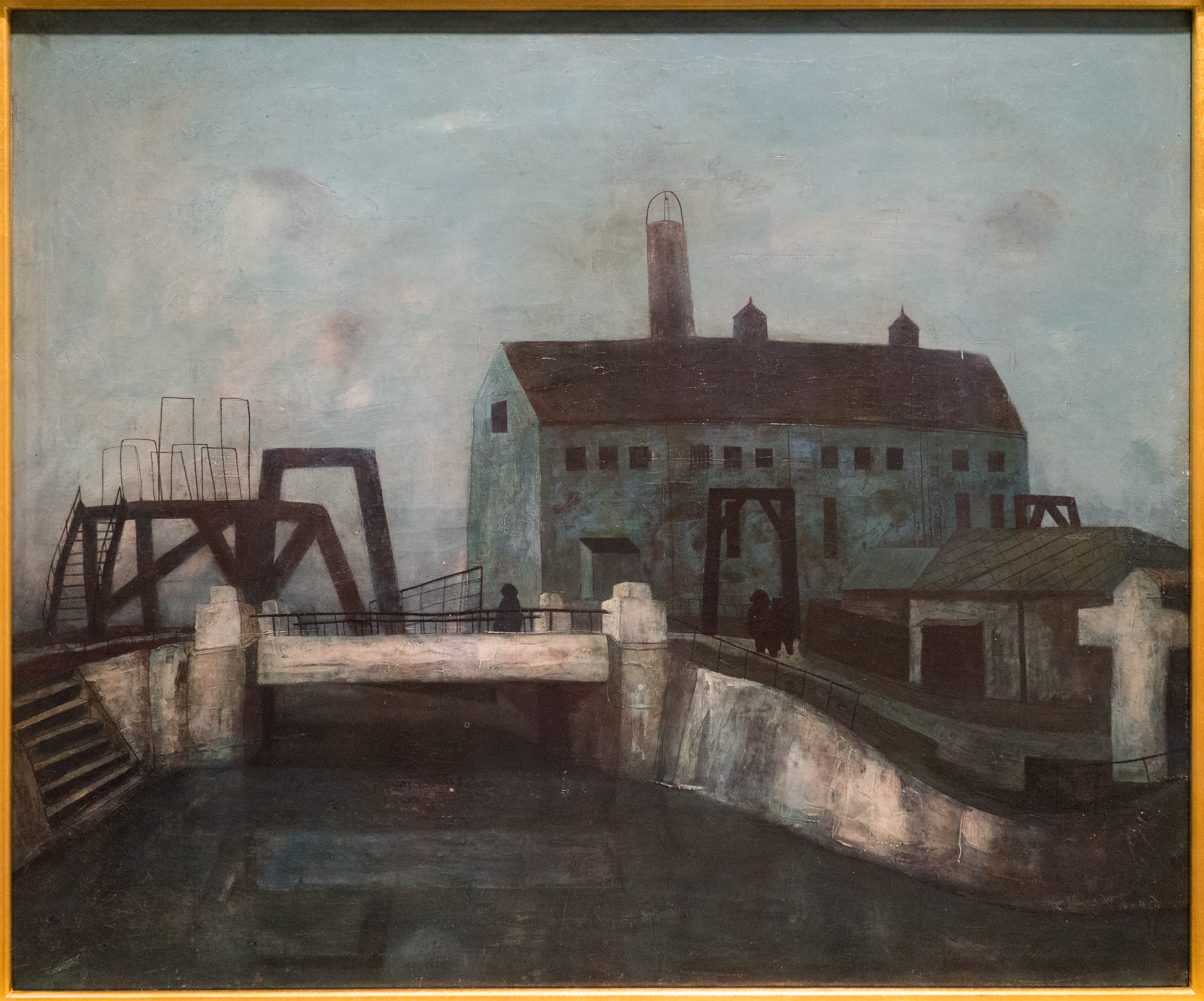
Bridge in Y-City (1943)

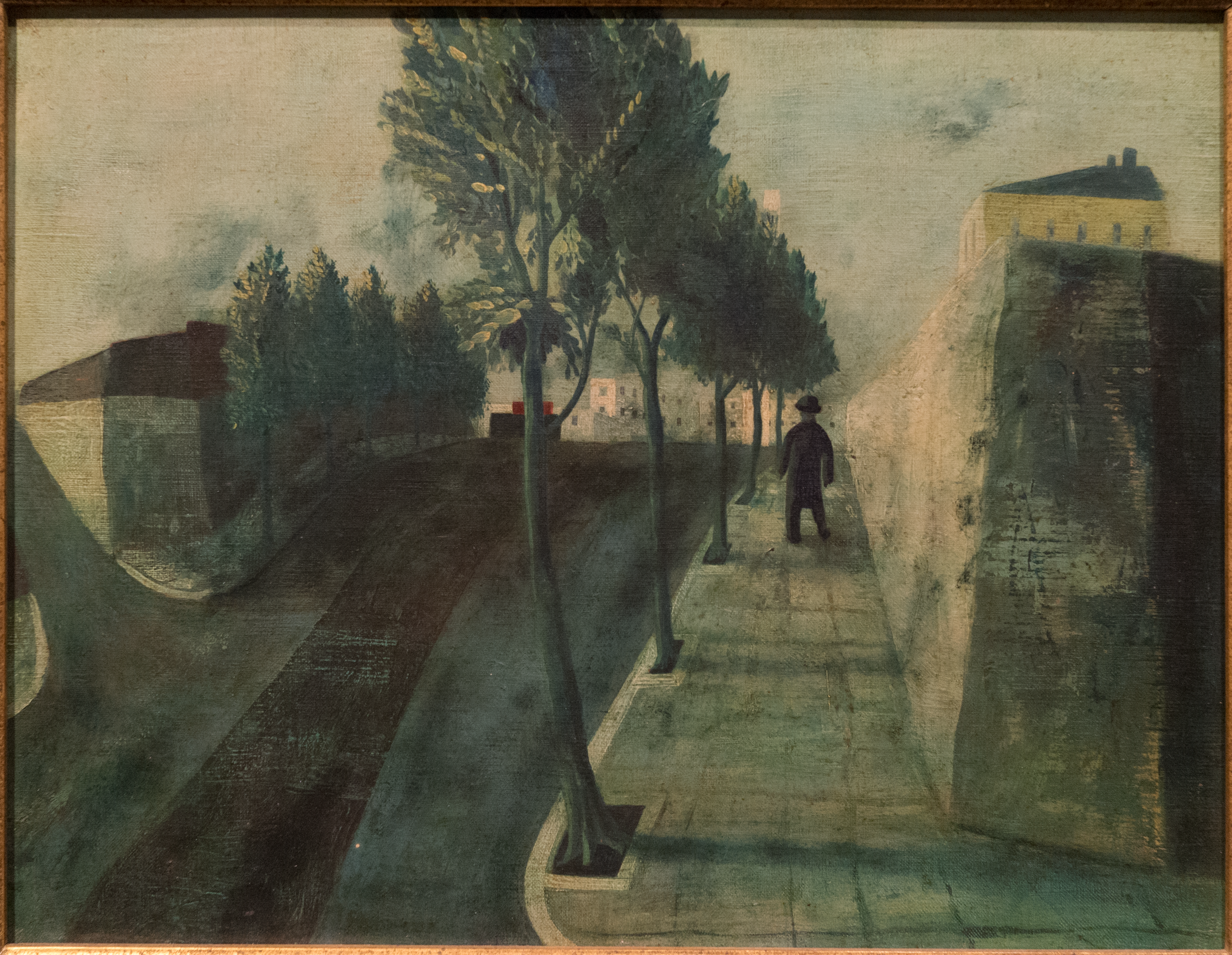
Tree-Lined Street (1943)

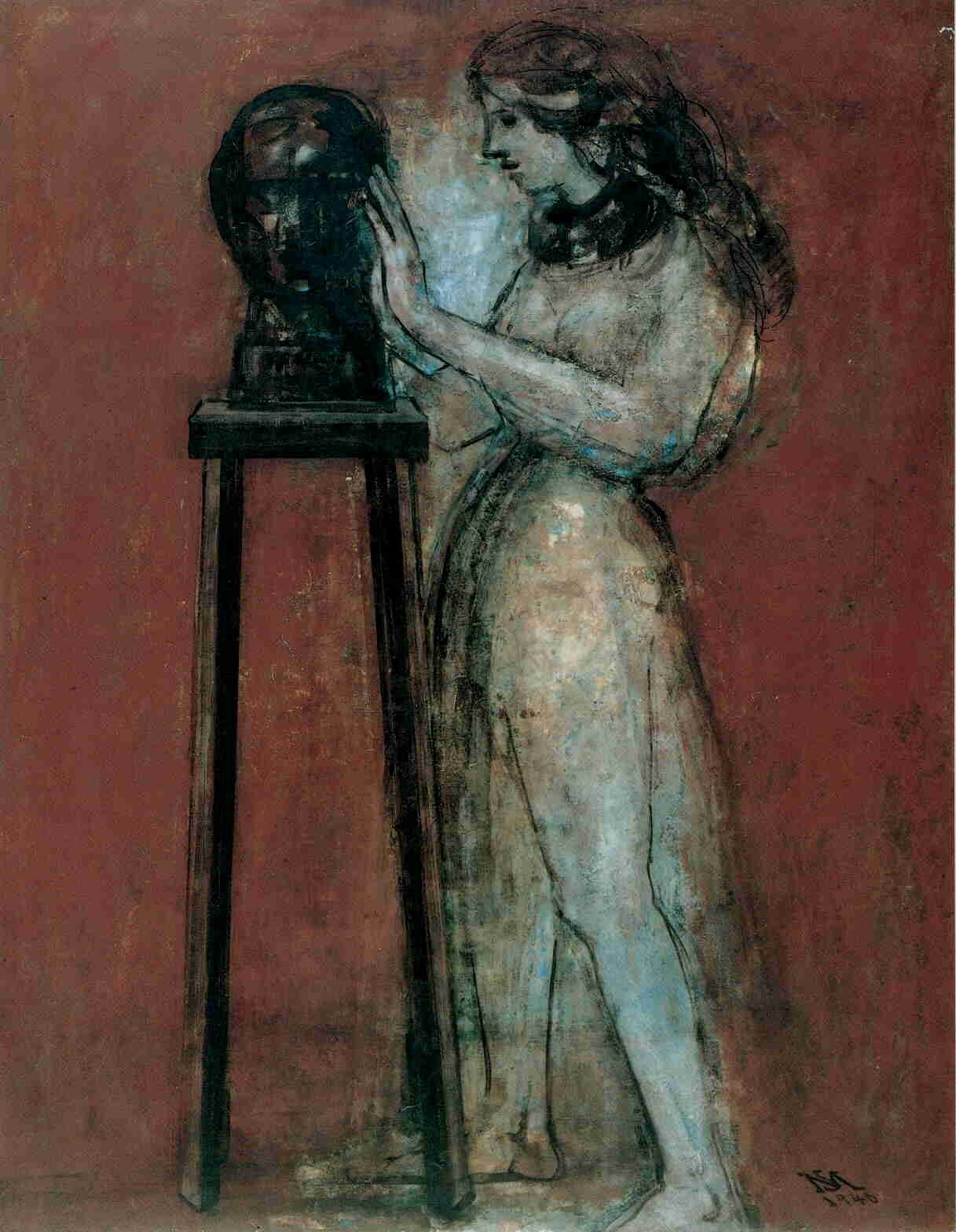
Woman with sculpture (1948)
