= Sompo Museum of Art =

Art museum in Shinjuku, Tokyo

Coordinates: 35°41′34″N 139°41′47″E

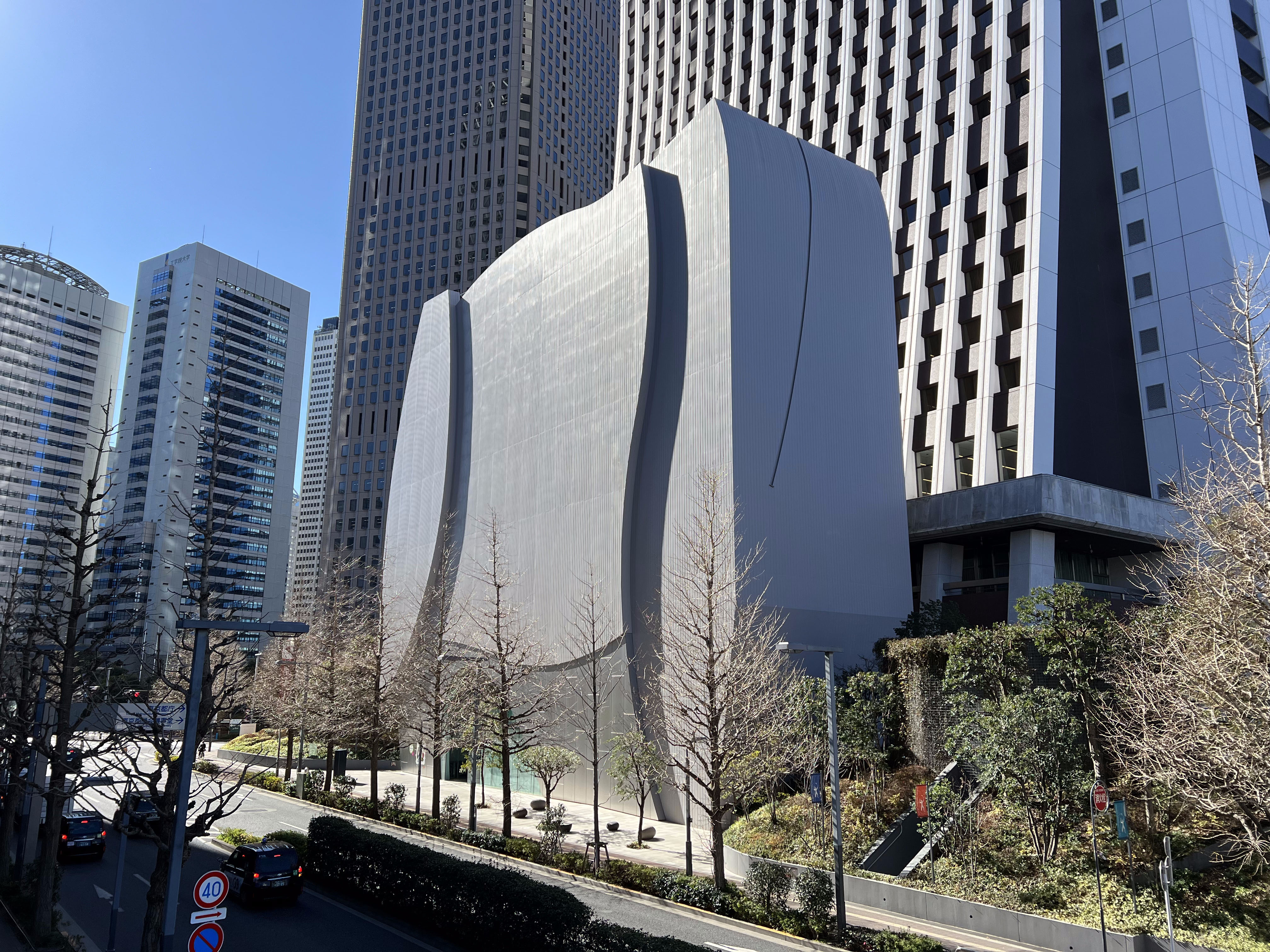
- Established: 1976
- Location: Shinjuku, Tokyo, Japan
- Type: Art museum
- Website: https://www.sompo-museum.org/en/

The Sompo Museum of Art (SOMPO美術館, Sonpo bijutsukan) is an art museum in Shinjuku, Tokyo, Japan. It is owned by the Japanese insurance company SOMPO and is located next to the company's headquarters. It started as the Seiji Togo Memorial Sompo Japan Nipponkoa Museum of Art in 1976 and gradually expanded. The current six-storey building was completed in 2020.

The museum became famous when it bid 5.8 billion yen (£25 million) for one of Vincent van Gogh's Sunflowers paintings at Christie's in London on 30 March 1987, far exceeding the largest amount ever paid for a painting. The record up to that point was 1.95 billion yen (£8.2 million), which was paid for Adoration of the Magi by Mantegna. The painting has been in the museum's collection ever since.

== Collection ==
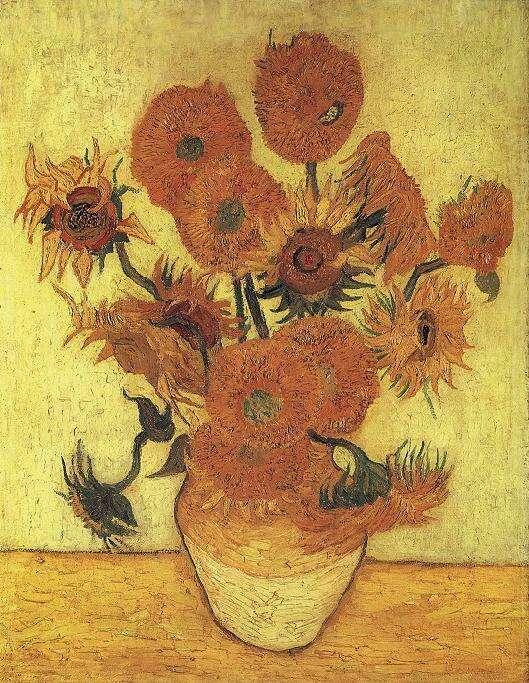
Sunflowers (F457), Vincent van Gogh, 1888

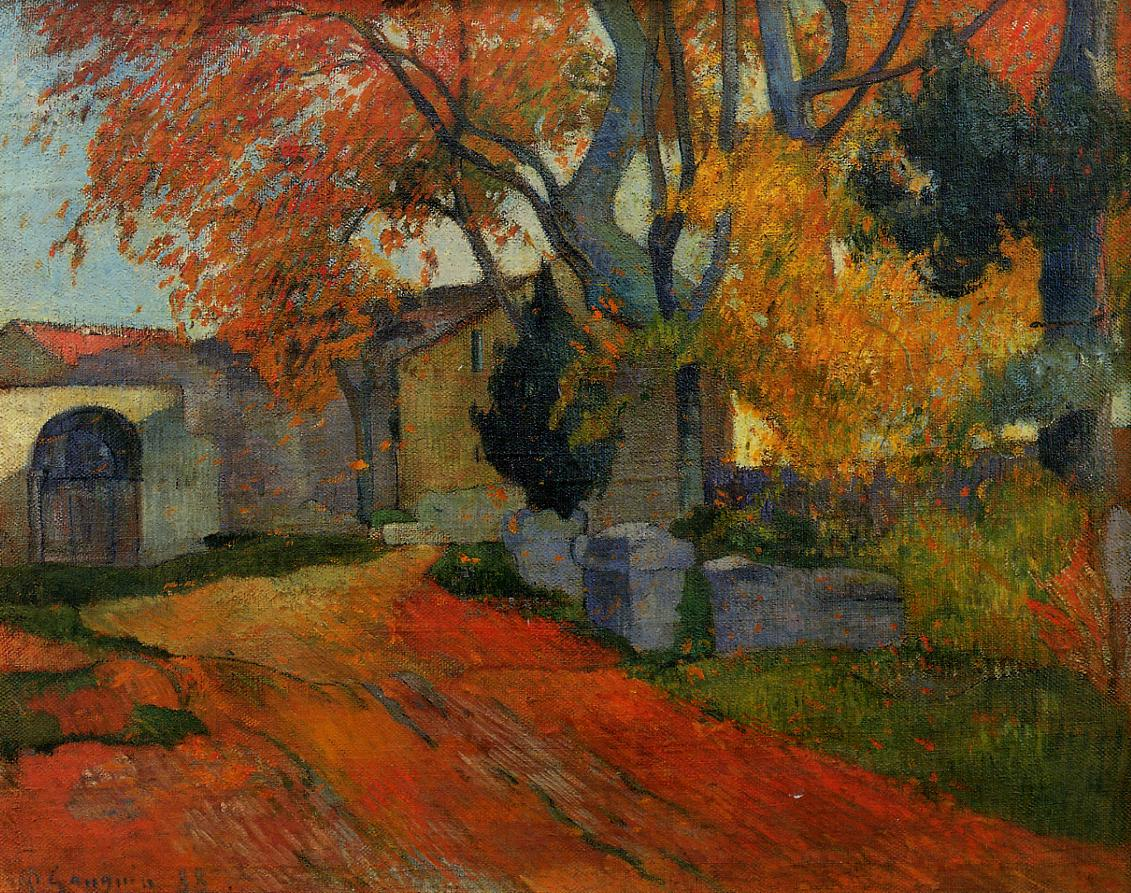
Lane at Alchamps, Arles, Paul Gauguin, 1888

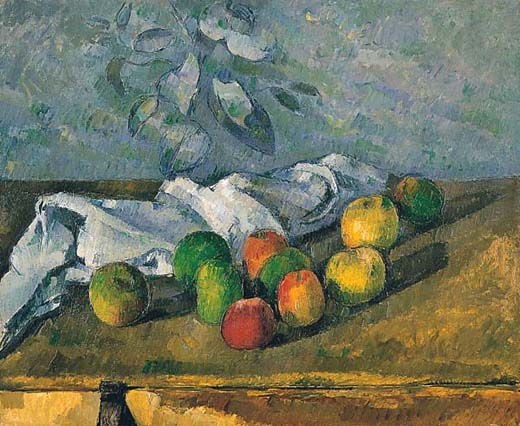
Apples and Serviette, Paul Cézanne, 1879
