= Isabelle Johnson =

American painter

Isabelle Johnson, 1966

Isabelle Jonette Johnson (April 23, 1901 – May 13, 1992) was an American painter noted as one of the first modernist painters in Montana. Her ranch has been converted into Tippet Rise, an outdoor sculpture park and art center.

== Background ==
Johnson was born on a sheep ranch in Absarokee, Montana. She studied painting and sculpture at Columbia University and was selected in 1946 by Henry Varnum Poor to participate in the first class of his experimental Skowhegan School of Painting and Sculpture in Skowhegan, Maine. Afterward she moved back to the Johnson family ranch in Stillwater County Montana, where she began working as one of the first modernist artists in the state. Inspired by the French Post-Impressionists, and how they saw color. She spent most of her life painting the Stillwater River Valley and the Absaroka-Beartooth Mountains.

Johnson said of Gauguin when writing about color, "His paintings are so intense that one Gaugin is magnificent, a room filled with Gaugin's works can make you ill." Later in her essay, "That Wonderful World of Color," she wrote, "Forget how other people use color and use the colors you feel in your mind's eye and your imagination. This canvas is not for your husband, wife, or neighbor, but for yourself, so have courage to fail if necessary."

== Career ==
Johnson taught at Montana State University Billings, from 1949 to 1961 and served as department head from 1954 to 1961. As a teacher of art in Montana she taught Modernism, often having to introduce her students to that genre. "She felt it was a requirement of her job that she push us and lead us to look in other directions that were not traditional, and she did it without saying a mean word about [Charles M.] Russell or any other traditional painter," said Donna Loos, one of her students. She received the Montana Governor's Award for the Arts in 1983 and the Distinguished Service Award from Eastern Montana College (now Montana State University, Billings) in 1984. Her most famous student, Theodore Waddell, said three weeks after meeting her, "I decided I did not want to be alive and not make art."

The Yellowstone Art Museum published an anthology of her work and life in 2015. The Yellowstone Art Museum, Billings, Montana, owns 827 Johnson-related works in its permanent collection, the majority of which were donated by Johnson.

== Education ==
Johnson's educational background is as follows:

- B.A. (History) University of Montana
- Los Angeles County Museum School
- University of Southern California, Los Angeles
- Otis Art School, Los Angeles, California
- The Arts Students' League, New York City
- M.A. (History) Columbia University
- School of Painting and Sculpture, Columbia University (graduate school)
- Skowhegan School of Painting and Sculpture, Skowhegan, Maine
- Studied throughout Europe, 1955–1956

== Bibliography ==
- Johnson, Isabelle (1971). Paintings, Isabelle Johnson. Great Falls, Montana: C.M. Russell Museum.
- Johnson, Isabelle (1986). Isabelle Johnson: a retrospective. Billings, Montana: Yellowstone Art Center.
- Johnson, Isabelle; Bennett, Drew; Peterson, Robyn G.; Durden, Bob; Forbes, Donna M.; Vettel-Becker, Patricia; Halstead, Peter; Waddell, Theodore (2015). A Lonely Business: Isabelle Johnson's Montana.

== Sources ==
- Johnson, Isabelle. A lonely business : Isabelle Johnson's Montana. Bennett, Drew; Peterson, Robyn G.; Durden, Bob; Forbes, Donna M.; Vettel-Becker, Patricia; Halstead, Peter. Billings, Montana. ISBN 9780975518595. OCLC 930894151.
