= Katsura Funakoshi =

Japanese sculptor (1951–2024)

- 舟越 桂
- Born: 25 May 1951; Morioka, Iwate, Japan
- Died: 29 March 2024 (aged 72); Morioka, Iwate, Japan
- Education: Tokyo University of the Arts
- Occupation: Sculptor
- Father: Yasutake Funakoshi

Katsura Funakoshi (舟越 桂, Funakoshi Katsura; 25 May 1951 – 29 March 2024) was a Japanese sculptor.

Funakoshi was well-known in the field of visual arts in Japan. His father, Yasutake Funakoshi, was also a sculptor and soon he felt the same vocation. He studied at the Tokyo University of the Arts, from 1971 to 1975, and at the University of Fine Arts and Music, from 1975 to 1977. He started carving in camphor wood in 1980. His works, usually depicting human figures from the waist up, have a great poetical effect, and are striking and distinctive. Funakoshi worked this material in a personal way and left visible both the grain of the wood and the marks of carving. The artist carefully utilised the grain for modelling and left part of the head unpainted, normally the crown.

Funakoshi exhibited his work at the Venice Biennale, the São Paulo Biennale, the Documenta IX, and the Shanghai Biennale, and his work is represented in several art museums in Japan and other countries.

Funakoshi died from lung cancer on 29 March 2024, at the age of 72.

== Sources ==
- "Two Heads are Better than One". The Japan Times. 25 February 2001. Archived from the original on 6 June 2011.
