= Aimitsu =

Japanese artist and painter (1907–1946)

Ai-Mitsu
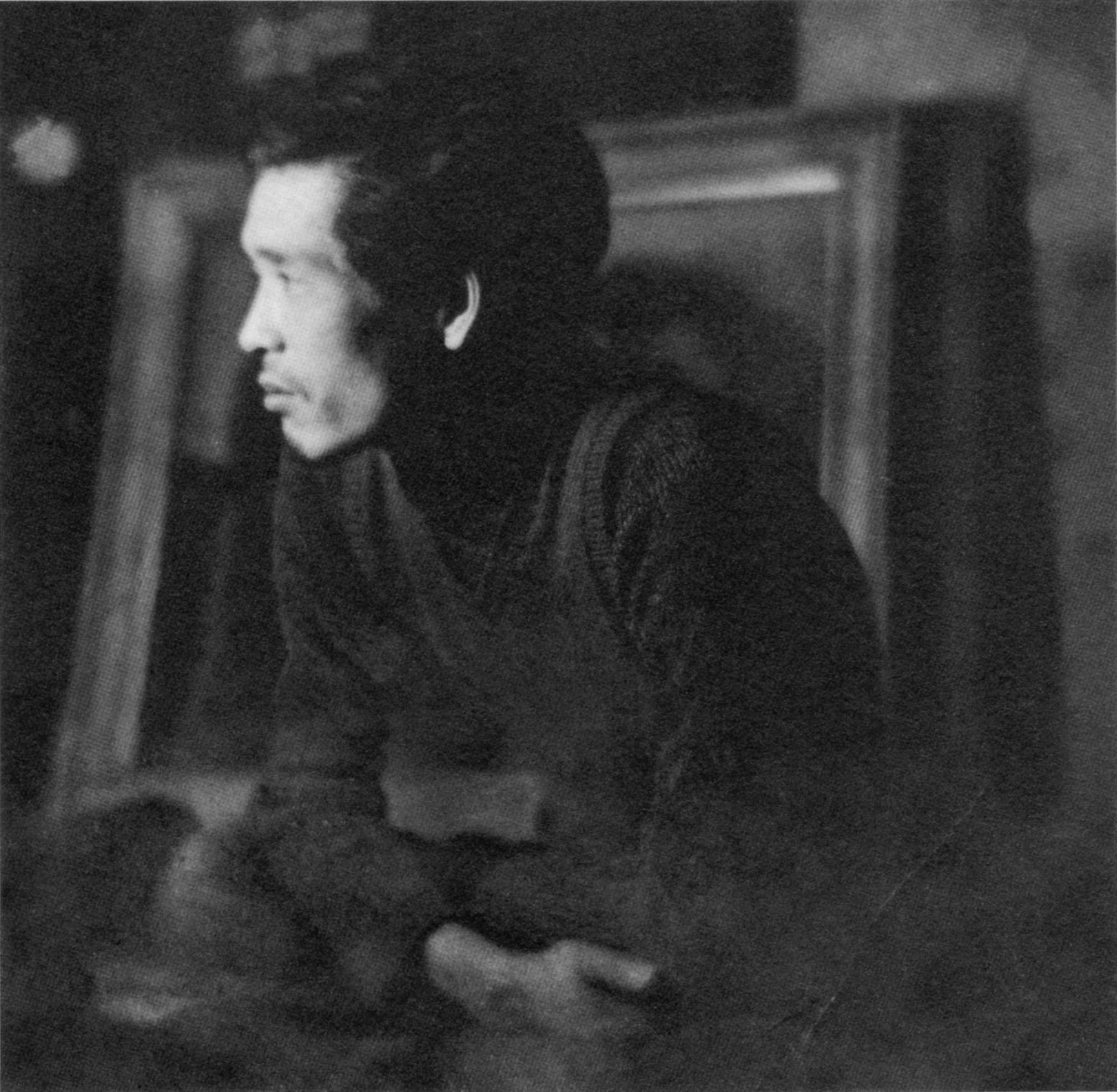
- Born: Nichirō Ishimura; June 24, 1907; Hiroshima, Japan
- Died: January 19, 1946 (aged 38); Shanghai, China
- Known for: Painting
- Notable work: "Landscape with an Eye"

Ai-Mitsu (Japanese: 靉光) (June 24, 1907 – January 19, 1946) was a Japanese artist and painter. He was also known as Akemitsu or his birth name, Nichiro Ishimura (石村 日郎). He is usually identified as a Surrealist although he also painted works that can be classified in other styles and genres.

== Biography ==
He was born into a small landowning family in 1907 in Hiroshima, and given the name Nichiro Ishimura, which he later changed to Ai-Mitsu when he moved to Tokyo to pursue his career as an artist. In 1934 he married Kie Momota, a teacher of the deaf who helped support him through his struggles as an artist. His most famous work is "Landscape with an Eye" (1938), currently held in the collection of the National Museum of Modern Art, Tokyo. It consists of shapeless forms with a large eye in a landscape setting.

He was a friend and colleague to deaf artist Shunsuke Matsumoto, and helped to form the avant garde group Bijutsu Bunka Kyokai in 1939. In 1943 he and Matsumoto were among the eight members of the Shinjin Gakai (New People's Painting Association). He made three "intense self portraits" in 1943 and 1944, including one in which he is dressed in women's clothing. In 1944 he was conscripted into the Japanese infantry and sent to China, where he died in 1946 from malnutrition and a fever, possibly due to malaria and dysentery, at a hospital on the outskirts of Shanghai. He was 38 years old.

In Spring 2007, a retrospective exhibition commemorating the 100th anniversary of Aimitsu's birth was held at the National Museum of Modern Art, Tokyo.
