= Tatsuko =

- Gender: Female

Origin
- Origin: Japanese
- Meaning: Different meanings depending on the kanji used

Tatsuko (written: 立子, 竜子 or たつ子) is a feminine Japanese given name. Notable people with the name include:

- Tatsuko Hoshino (星野 立子; 1903—1984), Japanese poet
- Kyōgoku Tatsuko (京極 竜子; died 1634), Japanese noble
- Tatsuko Ohsako (大迫たつ子; born 1952), Japanese golfer

== See also ==
- Tatsuko (mythology), a mythological princess known for her beauty
