= Harue Koga =

Japanese surrealist painter (1924–2011)

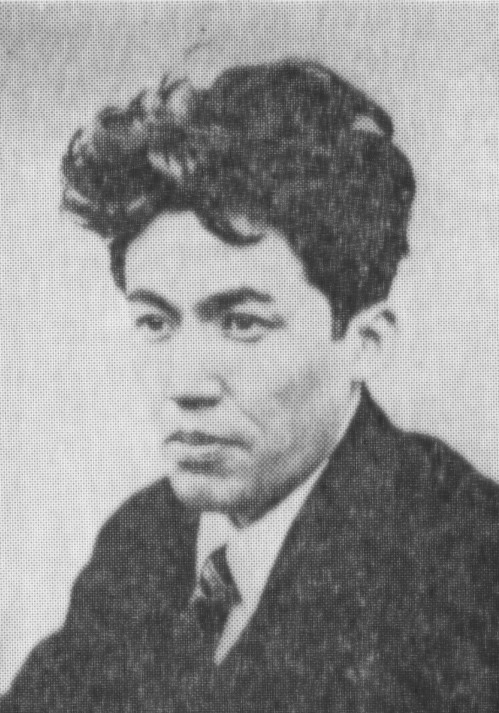
- Harue Koga in 1930
- Born: Yoshio Koga; June 18, 1895; Kurume, Fukuoka, Japan
- Died: September 10, 1933 (aged 38); Tokyo, Japan
- Education: Pacific Art Society Institute, Institute of the Japanese Watercolor Society
- Alma mater: Taishō University
- Notable work: Fireworks (1927), Innocent Moonlit Night (1929), The Sea (1929), Makeup through the Window (1930)
- Movement: Cubism, Expressionism, Surrealism

Harue Koga (古賀 春江, Koga Harue; June 18, 1895 – September 10, 1933) was a Japanese avant-garde painter active from the 1910s to the early 1930s. He is considered to be one of the first and one of the most representative Japanese surrealist painters.

== Early life ==
Harue Koga was born Yoshio Koga in 1895 to parents Seijun and Ishi Koga in the town of Kurume in Fukuoka Prefecture on the island of Kyushu, Japan. His father Seijun was the head priest of a local Buddhist temple belonging to the Jōdo-shū sect of Buddhism. Koga began attending Hiroshi Jinjo Elementary School at age seven, and shortly after his father, Seijun, gave his position of head priest to his son-in-law to focus his time on his son's education, hoping that Koga would also follow in the family tradition by becoming a Buddhist priest. Koga continued his education at Kurume Higher Elementary School at age 11, and at 14 moved on to Meizenko Middle School. During his time at Meizenko Middle School, he was struck in the eye during a baseball game and his eye began gradually losing its sight. Koga's friend Takata Rikizo hypothesized that Koga's partial loss of sight may have influenced the general lack of dimension in his art style. While in middle school, Koga began studying painting with Matsuda Teisho, a self-taught local artist inspired by Western-style art. In 1912, Koga defied the student code of conduct at Meizenko Middle School and was expelled. Local tradition in Kurume records that Koga purposely violated the rule and got himself expelled in order to show his family how serious he was about pursuing his love of art. That same year, at age 17, Koga left Kurume against his family's wishes and traveled to Tokyo with the intent of studying art in a more formal setting.

Upon his arrival in Tokyo, Koga enrolled in the Pacific Art Society Institute, a school known for teaching Western style art. In 1913, Koga enrolled in the Institute of the Japanese Watercolor Society, which he became closely affiliated with over the course of his career. Later that year, Koga and Matsuda Teisho formed the Raimoku Western-style Painting Society with a number of local artists in Kurume. Exhibitions hosted by Raimoku would be one of the first venues where Koga could formally exhibit his art.

In 1915, he was deeply affected by the suicide of his best friend so his father, concerned about his behavior, made him return home. After a brief stay in Nagasaki, and a thwarted affair with a distant relative of his father, he entered the Buddhist priesthood and was given the name Harue ("spring bough," usually a feminine name). Shortly after, he fell in love with Oka Yoshie, a local poet. His family opposed the marriage until he agreed to succeed his father as the local priest.

Shortly after, his father died and he began auditing classes in theology at what is now Taishō University while continuing to paint in his spare time. In 1917, he was hospitalized for pleurisy. On his way home to recuperate, he became ill with the flu, which turned into pneumonia. Although in critical condition, he recovered but had missed so much time at the university, he decided to quit school and concentrate on painting, after which his family withdrew financial support.

Koga's interest in the arts was not limited to painting. He was also an avid fan of poetry, and for a time considered a career in naniwabushi, a traditional Japanese style of musical theater. Koga also developed a deep appreciation for Asakusa Opera, an extremely popular form of light opera staged in the Asakusa district of Tokyo, and would frequent shows in the late 1910s and early 1920s. Koga's love of Asakusa Opera was generally disapproved of by his colleagues in the Japanese Watercolor Society, as it was as considered a low-class art.

== Avant-garde artist ==
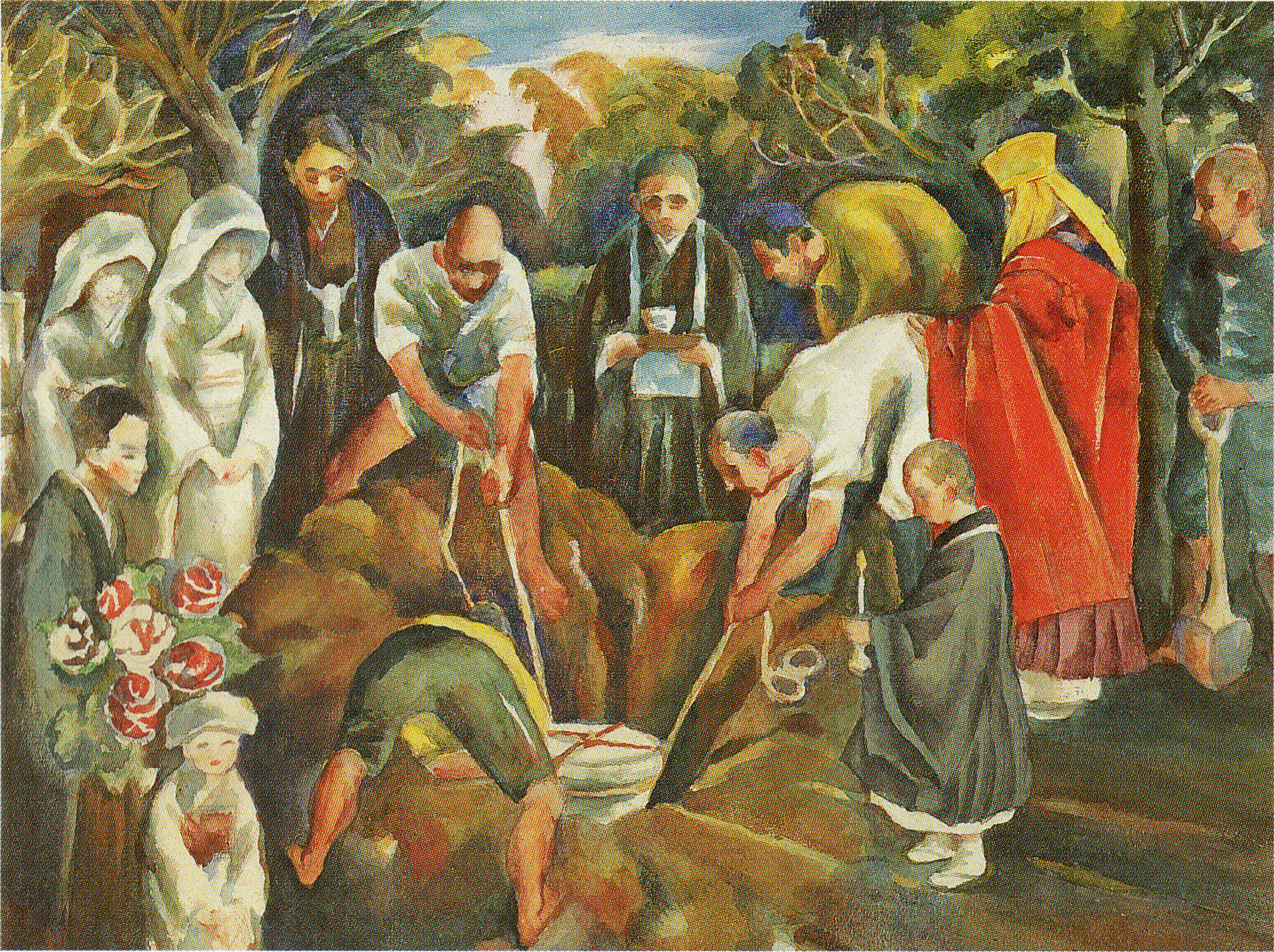
Burial (1922)

Koga's formal debut as an artist occurred in 1922 when two of his paintings were chosen for the Nika Exhibition, an exhibition dedicated to showcasing younger Japanese artists and artists utilizing experimental and modern styles in their works. Of these two paintings, especially notable is Burial, a "Cubistic" painting which art historian Chinghsin Wu argues was partially inspired by Spanish classical painter El Greco's painting The Burial of the Count of Orgaz (1586) and was painted in response to the stillbirth of Koga's daughter the year before. Thereafter, Koga continued to have his paintings accepted into the Nika Exhibition every year until his death. In 1926 he became an associate member of Nika and later a full member in 1929.

In 1922 Koga assisted in the formation of the avant-garde art group "Action", which endeavored to create art candidly and without the potential limitations of existing artistic movements. Koga's involvement in Action also gave him access to Western art works and publications, as the group attempted to become international and many of the wealthier members had Western pieces in their possession. Action held their first exhibition in April 1923 at the Mitsukoshi department store in Tokyo, and held their second exhibition at the same location in April of the following year. Though the exhibitions drew large crowds, many of the artworks did not sell and when they did it was for very little. Eventually tension between the artists involved in Action became too great and the group disbanded two years after their formation.

Having experimented with Cubism in his pieces from 1922 to 1924, Koga thereafter began to paint more fantastical pieces inspired by Swiss-German expressionist painter Paul Klee, such as Fireworks (1927) and Innocent Moonlit Night (1929). Koga continued to paint a majority of his paintings in this style until 1929. He exhibited paintings in this style at the Nika Exhibition over the course of his career, as well as the Prince Shotoku Fine Art Exhibition in 1926. Koga had a severe nervous breakdown in November 1927 and briefly returned to Fukuoka before moving to Nagasaki in May 1928. He recovered from his neurasthenia and returned to Tokyo in October 1928. Over this time, he continued to develop his artistic style and developed more pieces influenced by Paul Klee and exhibiting a fantasy style. Around this time, Koga became deeply interested in emerging schools of thought and was introduced to painters Seiji Tōgō and Kongō Abe, who had just returned from studying art in Europe. In 1929, Koga began painting cover designs and illustrations for various magazines and novels, and in June of 1930 he was given the opportunity to work on set design of the play Ruru due to his connection to Tōgō and Abe. In 1931, Koga and Abe became affiliated with an avant-garde poetry workshop in Shinjuku.

In 1929, Koga's painting style shifted, and he began exhibiting large-scale paintings in a photomontage style, which are considered some of the first Surrealist paintings in Japan. Recent scholarship has uncovered how Koga appropriated a wide variety of images and motifs from contemporary mass-media sources such as photo magazines, newspapers, film stills, and postcards. This technique is similar to the collage techniques widely used by contemporary Cubist, Dadaist, and Surrealist artists. However, Koga's technique was unique in that he did not simply cut and paste from printed media onto his canvas, but instead modified, resized, and rearranged objects by painting them photorealistically onto his large canvases. The Sea, Koga's most famous work, first appeared at the 16th Nika Exhibition in 1929. It contains various motifs which he had copied from magazines and postcards, including a large image of the American film actress Gloria Swanson. Other notable works in this style include Makeup through the Window (1930), and Intellectual Expression Crossing the Reality Line (1931), which included an image of the mechanical robot Eric, which had been exhibited in London in 1928. Koga continued to develop artworks in this style until his death in 1933.

== Illness and death ==
In 1929, Koga became ill and blamed it on the strain caused by participating in a major exhibition. More periods of illness followed and his condition was later diagnosed as syphilis. This, together with being a heavy smoker, eventually caused a tremor that affected his work. During this period, he also became friends with Yasunari Kawabata, who lived nearby, as they apparently shared an interest in dogs. As his disease progressed, he began to suffer from severe neuralgia and started behaving strangely. By early 1933, he required hospitalization and, despite various intense treatments (including malaria therapy), died later that year.

Koga was described by friends and family throughout his lifetime as a sickly individual. Following his death, Koga's acquaintance Nakano Kaichi, who was a doctor, chronicled his symptoms and conducted a psychiatric evaluation. Nakano felt that Koga's symptoms were characteristic of a schizoid personality, particularly given his preference for solitude and occasional episodes of paranoia.

== Selected paintings ==
The Sea (1929)

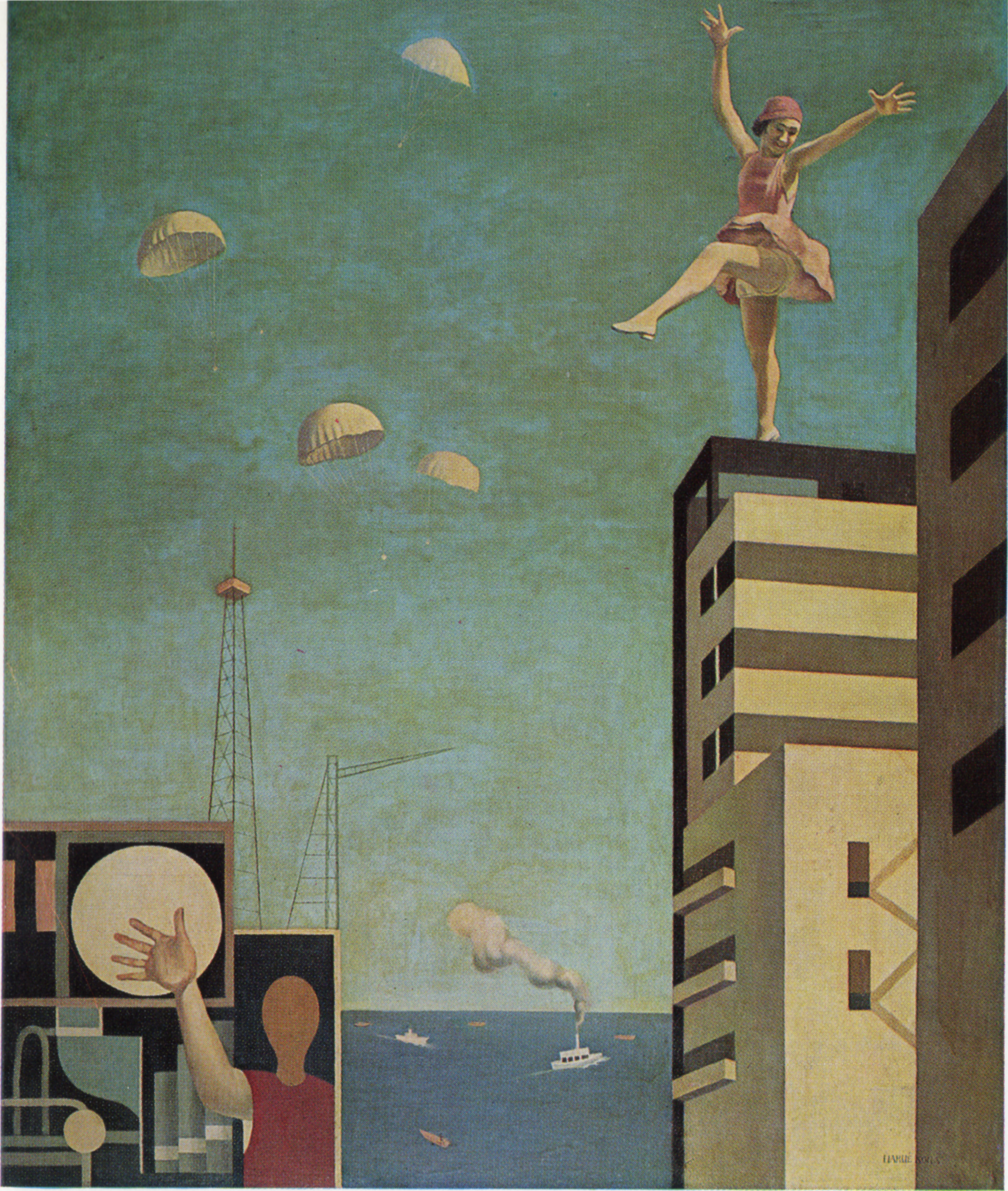
Makeup through the Window (1930)

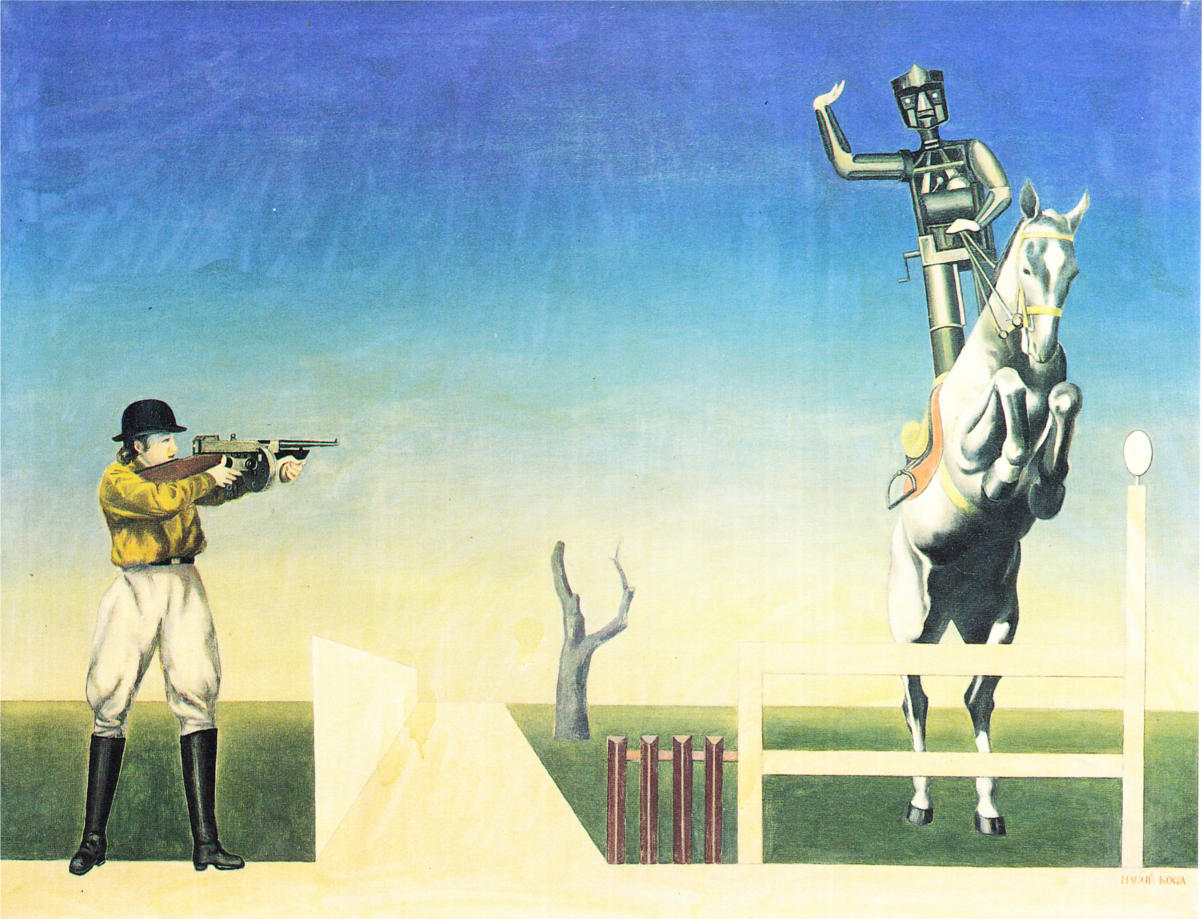
Intellectual Expression Crossing the Reality Line (1931)

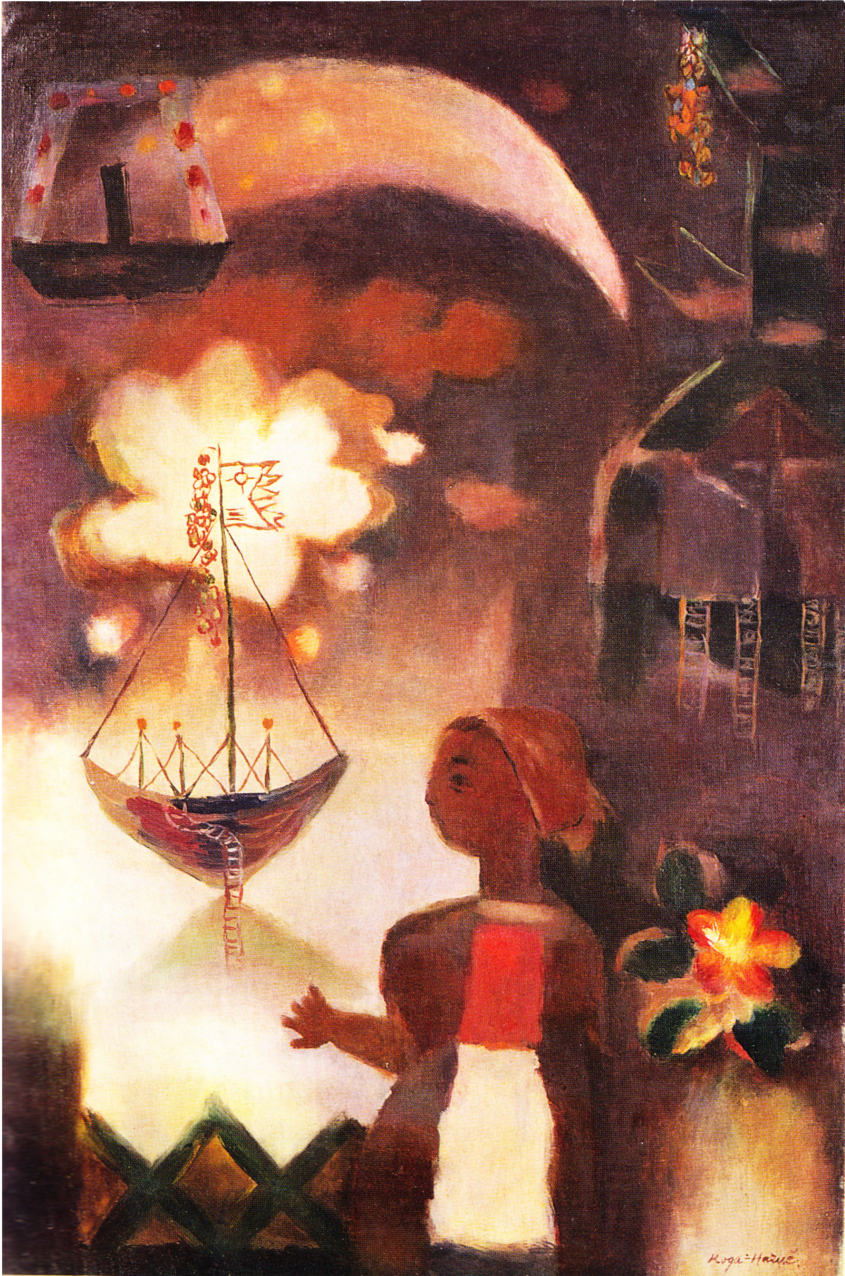
Fireworks (1927)

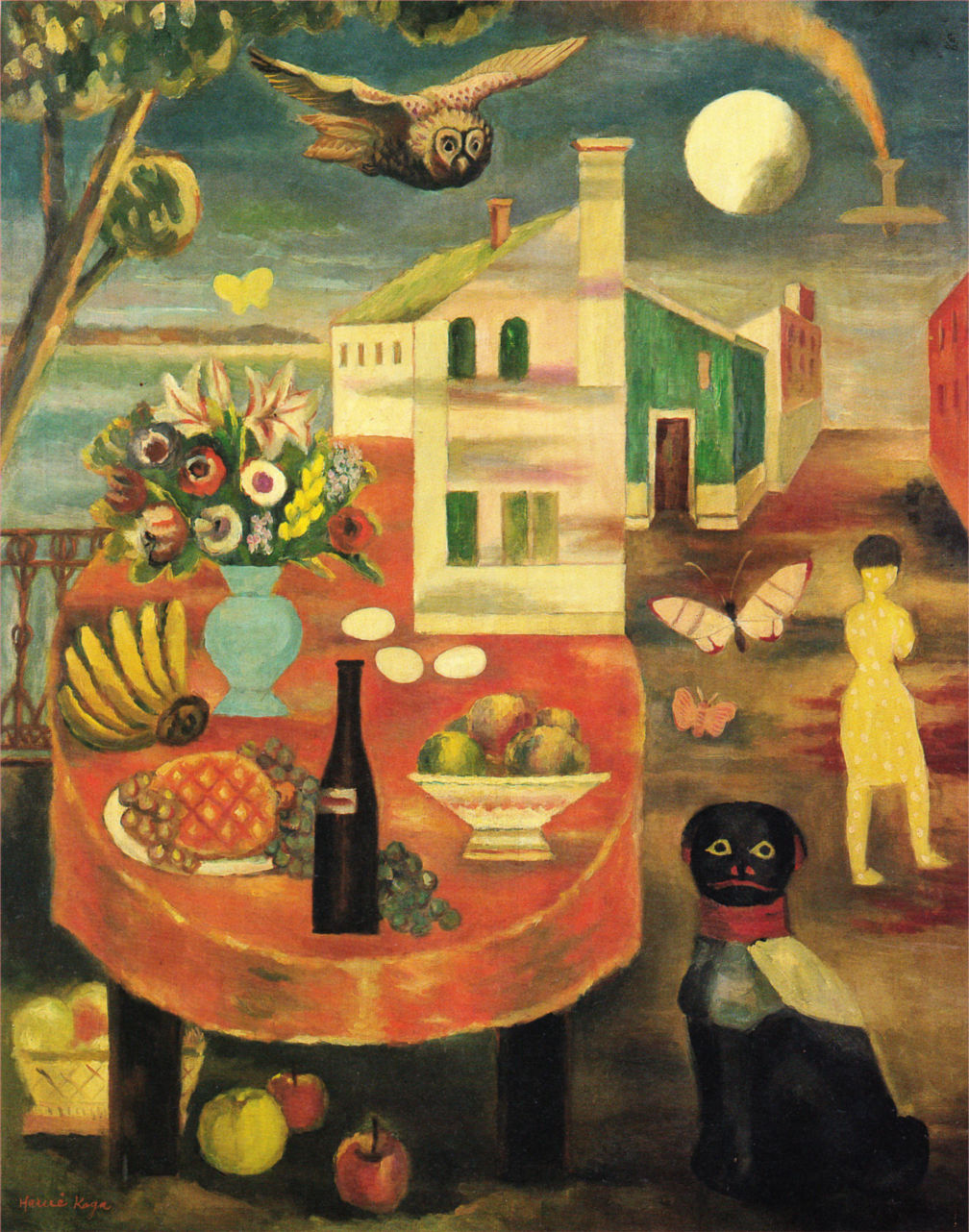
Innocent Moonlit Night (1929)
