= Takeo Yamaguchi =

Japanese painter (1902–1983)

- 山口長男
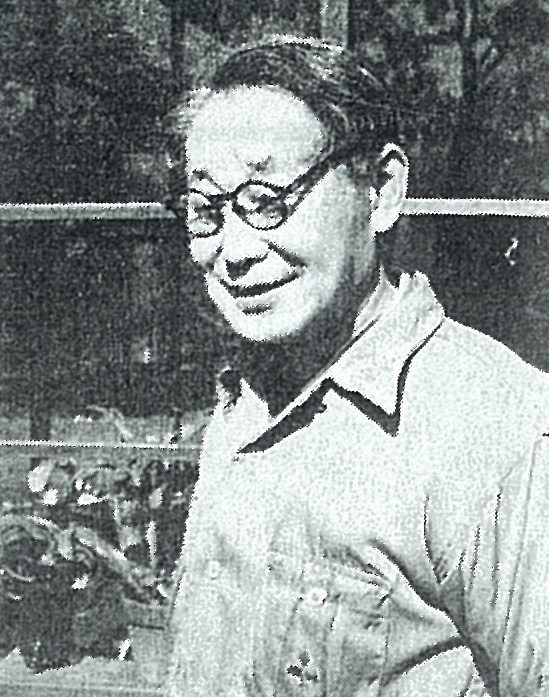
- Takeo Yamaguchi in 1964
- Born: November 23, 1902; Seoul, Korea
- Died: April 23, 1983 (aged 80); Tokyo, Japan
- Known for: Painting
- Movement: Avant-garde, Monochrome Art Informel

Takeo Yamaguchi (山口長男, Yamaguchi Takeo, born November 23, 1902, in Seoul, Korea, died April 23, 1983, in Tokyo, Japan) was an avant-garde Japanese painter of monochrome Art Informel works.

== About ==
Yamaguchi studied Western painting at the Tokyo Art School. Upon graduation in 1927, he moved to Paris to study European painting. He developed his mature style during the mid-1950s, with a focus on flatness.

Yamaguchi's Yellow Eyes, painted in 1959, sold for US$948,500 at Sotheby's Contemporary Art Evening Sale in New York on May 18, 2017, which set a record for the highest price paid for the artist's work.

== Exhibitions ==
=== Group exhibitions ===
- 1955 - São Paulo Biennial
- 1956 - Venice Biennale: Japan Pavilion
- 1958 - Guggenheim Museum: Guggenheim International Award exhibition,
- 1963 - São Paulo Biennial
- 1964 - Museum of Modern Art, New York: The New Japanese Painting and Sculpture

=== Solo exhibitions ===
- 1961 - Minami Gallery, Tokyo
- 1963 - Nihonbashi Gallery, New York
- 1965 - Minami Gallery, Tokyo
- 1968 - Minami Gallery, Tokyo
- 1972 - Minami Gallery, Tokyo
- 1975 - Minami Gallery, Tokyo

=== Permanent collections ===
- Guggenheim Museum, New York
- Metropolitan Museum of Modern Art, New York
- Brooklyn Museum, New York
- Menard Art Museum, Nagoya
- Shizuoka Prefectural Museum of Art
- Shimane Art Museum
- Museu de Arte Moderna, São Paulo
- National Museum of Modern Art, Tokyo
- Municipal Museum, Kagoshima
- Museum of Modern Art, Kamakura
