= Seiji Tōgō =

Japanese artist (1897–1978)

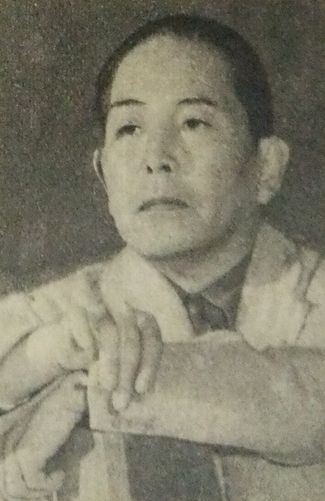
Seiji Tōgō

Seiji Togo (東郷 青児, Tōgō Seiji; 1897–1978) was a Japanese painter and artist known for his depiction of the female form. Born in Kagoshima Prefecture Japan, he graduated from middle school at Aoyama Gakuin University and displayed his first one-man show at Hibiya Art Museum at the age of 18. He later participated in the Futurist movement while studying in France. In 1928, he returned to Japan and was awarded the 1st Showa Western Art Promotion Award.

In discussions of early Surrealism in Japan, a Sompo Museum of Art collection entry for Tōgō's 1929 painting Surrealistic Stroll (exhibited at the 16th Nika Exhibition as Déclaration (超現実派風の散歩)) notes that it was discussed as a "new tendency" alongside works by Harue Koga and Kongō Abe and that Atorie published a Surrealism special issue in January 1930. Stojkovic describes that January 1930 issue as Japan's first magazine issue dedicated to Surrealist visual art.

In 1957, Togo received the Japan Art Academy Award, and in 1961 became a member of the Japan Art Academy. In 1969, was declared an Officier d'ordre des Arts et des Lettres by the French government and in 1976 was decorated with the Order of the Rising Sun, Second Class, with Rays. Togo died in 1978 in Kumamoto at the age of 80. Later that year, he was posthumously named a Person of Cultural Merit of the fourth court rank by the Japanese government.

His works can be seen at the Seiji Togo Memorial SOMPO Japan Museum of art in Tokyo, where more than 200 of his most prominent works are kept.
