= Gen'ichirō Inokuma =

Japanese painter

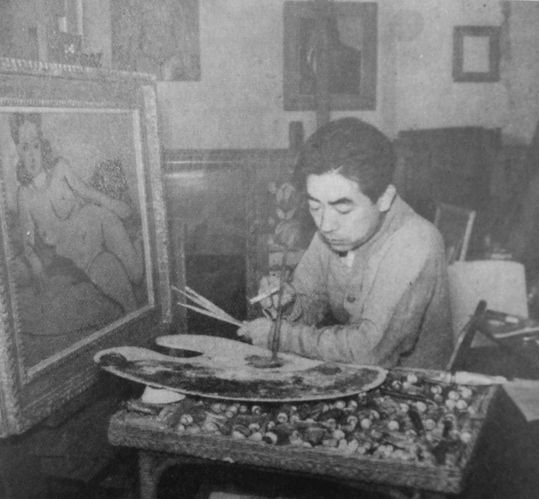
- Gen'ichirō Inokuma in 1948
- Born: Inokuma Gen'ichirō (猪熊玄一郎); 14 December 1902; Takamatsu, Japan
- Died: 17 May 1993 (aged 90); Tokyo, Japan
- Other name: Inokuma Gen'ichirō (猪熊弦一郎) Guén Inokuma
- Occupation: Painter

Gen'ichirō Inokuma (猪熊弦一郎, Inokuma Gen'ichirō; born on 14 December 1902, died on 17 May 1993) was a Japanese painter. Inokuma is best known for his large-scale abstract paintings that allude to industrial landscapes, ladders, rail tracks, derricks, cranes, urban maps, and city planners’ blueprints.

== Biography ==
=== Early life and career (1902–1935) ===
Gen'ichirō Inokuma was born in Takamatsu City, Kagawa Prefecture in 1902. Inokuma graduated from Marugame Middle School (丸亀中学校) in Marugame City in 1921 and then moved to Tokyo to study Western-style painting (Yōga) at a private art school, Hongō Painting Institute (Hongō yōga kenkyūjo; 本郷洋画研究所) founded by Saburōsuke Okada. The following year, he was admitted to the Tokyo School of Fine Arts (Tōkyō bijutsu gakkō; 東京美術学校; present Tokyo University of the Arts), continuing his education under Takeji Fujishima. His classmates at the Tokyo School of Fine Arts included Ryōhei Koiso, Takanori Ogisu, Kenzō Okada, Noriyuki Ushijima, and Takeo Yamaguchi.

In 1926, Inokuma’s work Portrait of a Woman (Fujinzō; 婦人像) was selected for the seventh Teiten (帝展) exhibition held by the Imperial Academy of Arts (Teikoku bijutsu-in; 帝国美術院; present Japan Art Academy) for the first time. In Portrait of a Woman, Inokuma painted Gustave Courbet’s Young Ladies on the Banks of the Seine (Summer) (1856-57) in the background, contrasting it with the model sitting in front of it, who is Inokuma's newly married wife. At this point, Inokuma had not yet seen the original Young Ladies on the Banks of the Seine (Summer), but he had accurately captured the death-defying languor of Courbet's work, while the Japanese woman's face, hands, and the floral patterns on her kimono were vivid. In the same year, he dropped out of the Tokyo School of Fine Arts due to health problems. In 1929, Inokuma received awards at the 16th Kōfūkai (光風会) exhibition and the 10th Teiten exhibition.

=== Withdrawal from Teiten and formation of the New Creation School Association (1936–1937) ===
Inokuma built a successful career, being selected for the Teiten almost every year, and after 1933, he was allowed to exhibit at the Teiten without judging. However, in 1936, in protest against the reorganization of the Teiten, Inokuma left the organization and formed the New Creation School Association (Shin seisaku-ha kyōkai 新制作派協会; present Shin seisaku kyōkai 新制作協会) with Masayoshi Ise, Ryōhei Koiso, Toshio Nakanishi, Yasushi Santa, Kei Satō, Iwao Uchida, and Kazu Wakita, who, according to their manifesto, shared the "artistic spirit of ‘anti-academicism’". In November of the same year, the first exhibition of the New Creation School Association was held, in which Takeji Fujishima participated as a special exhibitor in addition to the members' works. The association continues to this day as Shinseisaku Kyōkai, holding annual exhibitions and maintaining active membership.

In 1936, Inokuma also participated in the art competition on the occasion of the Summer Olympics in Berlin, along with other New Creation School Association members including Ise, Koiso, Satō, and Wakita.

=== Paris years (1938–1940) ===
Inokuma went to France in May 1938. In Paris, he exhibited his works at the Salon des Indépendants and socialized with Paris-based Japanese artists, including Tsuguharu Fujita. Inokuma also visited Henri Matisse in Nice. When Inokuma asked Matisse to critique his paintings, he was told, "Your paintings are too good," which Inokuma took to mean that he had not developed his own style.

The following year, as the war intensified, Inokuma was evacuated to Les Eyzies in the Dordogne Region with Tsuguharu Fujita and his wife. In June 1940, Inokuma departed Marseille on the Hakusan-maru, the last Japanese evacuation ship from France, with Tsuguharu Fujita, Takanori Ogisu, Tarō Okamoto and others. Inokuma arrived in Yokohama in August.

=== War painting (1941–1945) ===
In 1941, without much time to find respite after returning to Japan, Inokuma was sent to Nanjing, China with Kei Satō as military painters. Inokuma was then transferred to the Philippines with Manjirō Terauchi in 1942 and to Burma (Myanmar) with Ryōhei Koiso in 1943. While Inokuma exhibited his war paintings depicting battle scenes at the Army Art Exhibition (陸軍美術展) and other exhibitions, he also frequently exhibited works depicting landscapes and local people in China and Southeast Asia colonized by the Japanese Empire at the New Creation School Association exhibitions. For example, at the 6th exhibition of the New Creation School Association in 1941, he presented Children at the Quay of the Chang River (長江埠の子供達) in which several children are sending sharp glances back at the viewer.

In 1944, Inokuma was hospitalized at Chiba Medical University Hospital with kidney complications and underwent surgery. He was then evacuated to Yoshino Town, Tsukui-gun, Kanagawa Prefecture. In this town, Tsuguharu Fujita had already evacuated, and members of the New Creation School Association, including Inokuma, Takanori Ogisu, Kei Satō, Toshio Nakanishi, and Kazu Wakita, also evacuated there, temporary created a small artistic community.

=== Early postwar period (1945–1954) ===
After the end of the Second World War, Inokuma opened the Denenchofu Pure Art Laboratory (Den'enchōfu junsui bijutsu kenkyūjo; 田園調布純粋美術研究所) in 1947 to teach art to young people (the laboratory closed in 1955). Inokuma’s prominent pupils included Saori (Madokoro) Akutagawa. In 1950, Inokuma designed the famous red on white Hana Hiraku (華ひらく) wrapping paper for the Mitsukoshi Department Store.

In 1951, Inokuma completed the mural Freedom for Ueno Station. He also received the Grand Art Prize of the newspaper Mainichi Shimbun for his mural Democracy for Keio University. Democracy was installed on the east and west walls of the Student Hall at Keio University's Mita Campus, which was designed by Yoshirō Taniguchi and completed in 1949. In the early postwar period, money and materials were limited, so instead of using canvas, Inokuma decided to use enamel paint on plywoods screwed together and sprayed with lacquer on the surface. The two resulting murals depicted young men and women in various poses, singing, playing musical instruments, and relaxing, among animals, in a very lively manner. Inokuma developed a friendship with Isamu Noguchi, who came to Japan in 1950. Inokuma introduced Noguchi to Yoshirō Taniguchi, and Taniguchi also collaborated with Noguchi on the design of the Noguchi Room in the Second Faculty Building at Keio University's Mita Campus completed in 1951, as part of Taniguchi’s continuing efforts to create architecture as "comprehensive art".

Inokuma exhibited his works at the São Paulo Art Biennial in 1951. Following year, Inokuma participated in the Carnegie International in Pittsburgh. He then regularly exhibited at international exhibitions.

=== American years (1955–1975) ===
In 1955, Inokuma stopped in New York City on his way to Paris to study again and was attracted to the city, where he decided to establish his studio and became active as an abstract painter in the United States for the next 20 years. The year after his arrival in the US, Inokuma held his first solo show at the renowned Willard Gallery in New York, where he exhibited abstract paintings such as Haniwa (1956).

It was not until almost seven years after his arrival in New York City that Inokuma fully embraced abstraction; in the 1960s, he moved his studio from 95th Street to 23rd Street, from where he could look down on Madison Square Park and the Empire State Building was just ahead. It was in this environment that Inokuma began to depict metropolitan areas from a bird's eye view, as seen in The City Planning (1962). Fine lines like the grain of tatami mats are used vertically and horizontally, and in works such as Snake Line (1964), circular patterns are arranged to balance the overall composition and create a sense of rhythm. Inokuma’s abstractions from the early and mid 1960s are based on monochromatic colors such as gray, red, blue, and green.

In the late 1960s and 1970s, Inokuma’s color palette became richer, and his style gradually shifted from a bird's-eye view to parallel lines and geometric forms. In the Landscape series (c. 1971-1975), the main motifs were city buildings and ladders viewed from the side. The Landscape series, which offers a view of the city landscape from the side or a cross-sectional view of the city, marked the end of Inokuma's New York period with his accomplished abstract language that is rich and evocative of lilting pop music.

=== Later activities in Japan and Hawaii (1975-1993) ===
In 1973, while temporarily returning to Japan, Inokuma collapsed due to a cerebral thrombosis. In May 1975, Inokuma went to New York to close his studio, and in September, he traveled to Hawaii to rest and recuperate. From the following year, Inokuma began to work in Hawaii every winter to avoid the cold. In 1982, Inokuma had a solo exhibition at the Honolulu Academy of Arts.

In 1991, the Marugame Genichiro-Inokuma Museum of Contemporary Art (MIMOCA), designed by Yoshio Taniguchi (his father, Yoshirō Taniguchi, and Inokuma were close collaborators), was opened. The museum displays approximately 20,000 works donated by Inokuma himself, and holds special exhibitions of contemporary art. Today, along with Benesse Art Site Naoshima (which includes the Benesse House Museum, opened in 1992), and the Nagi Museum of Contemporary Art (opened in 1994), the Marugame Genichiro-Inokuma Museum of Contemporary Art has become an important transmitter of contemporary art in the Chūgoku and Shikoku regions. Two years after the opening of the Marugame Genichiro-Inokuma Museum of Contemporary Art, Inokuma died on 17 May 1993, at the age of 90. In his later years, he was awarded the Order of the Sacred Treasure (勲三等瑞宝章; 1980), the Kagawa Prefecture Person of Cultural Merit (香川県文化功労者; 1988), an Honorary Citizen of Marugame City (丸亀市名誉市民; 1991), and the 34th Mainichi Art Award (毎日芸術賞; 1993).
