= Shinseisaku Kyokai =

Japanese artists' association

Shinseisaku Kyōkai
- 新制作協会
- Formation: 1936
- Type: Artists' association
- Headquarters: Japan
- Fields: painting, sculpture, space design

Shinseisaku Kyōkai (Japanese: 新制作協会, lit. New Production Association) is a Japanese artists’ organization. It was founded in 1936 and is known for its annual exhibition, the Shinseisaku Art Exhibition (新制作展, Shinseisaku-ten).

== History ==
The association was founded in 1936 by seven painters—Gen'ichirō Inokuma, Masayoshi Ise, Toshio Nakanishi, Iwao Uchida, Ryōhei Koiso, Takashi Satō, and Yasushi Mita. The association was founded in opposition to academic art, avoiding government-run exhibitions and those considered incompatible with independent artistic practice. Thereafter, Kazuo Wakita and Makoto Suzuki (painter) joined, bringing the number of founding members to nine.

The Sculpture Section was established in 1939, followed by the Architecture Section in 1949, renamed the Space Design Section in 1969. Today, the association remains organized into three divisions: Painting, Sculpture, and Space Design.

In 1951, a Japanese Painting Section was created when thirteen Nihonga painters, including Fumiko Hori joined the association. At this time, the group adopted its current name, Shinseisaku Kyōkai. The Japanese Painting Section later became independent as the Sōga-kai (創画会), and was dissolved from Shinseisaku in 1974.

== Exhibitions ==
The association's annual exhibition is known as the Shinseisaku Art Exhibition (新制作展, Shinseisaku-ten) held at the National Art Center, Tokyo in Roppongi since 2007, beginning with the 71st exhibition. Prior, it was conducted each September at the Tokyo Metropolitan Art Museum.

The exhibition is known for staging relatively limited number of works compared with other major Japanese art associations and for conferring fewer awards. Judging is carried out by association members, with decisions made by majority vote after works are physically submitted.

Two awards are formally recognized: the Association Award (協会賞, Kyōkai-shō) and the New Artist Award (新作家賞, Shinsakka-shō), though in practice the latter functions as the main prize. Recipients of the New Artist Award are recommended as Kyōyū (協友, "associate members").

== Notable members ==
- Shin Hongo
- Gen'ichirō Inokuma
- Matazō Kayama
- Ryōhei Koiso
- Setsuko Migishi
- Takayoshi Oguiss
- Kenzō Tange
- Kazu Wakita

== See also ==
- Public exhibitions in Japan (公募展, kōboten)
- Sōga-kai (創画会), a Japanese painting society that became independent from Shinseisaku Kyōkai in 1974
