= Akutagawa =

Akutagawa (written: 芥川) is a Japanese surname. Notable people with the surname include:

- Ryūnosuke Akutagawa (芥川 龍之介, 1892–1927), Japanese poet and writer
- Yasushi Akutagawa (芥川 也寸志, 1925–1989), Japanese composer and conductor, son of Akutagawa Ryunosuke
- Madokoro Akutagawa Saori (芥川 (間所) 紗織, Akutagawa (Madokoro) Saori) (1924–1966), Japanese painter
- David Akutagawa (1937–2008), Japanese-Canadian martial artist

== See also ==
- Akutagawa Prize, a literary award
- Akutagawa (crater)
