= Marugame Genichiro-Inokuma Museum of Contemporary Art =

- 丸亀市猪熊弦一郎現代美術館
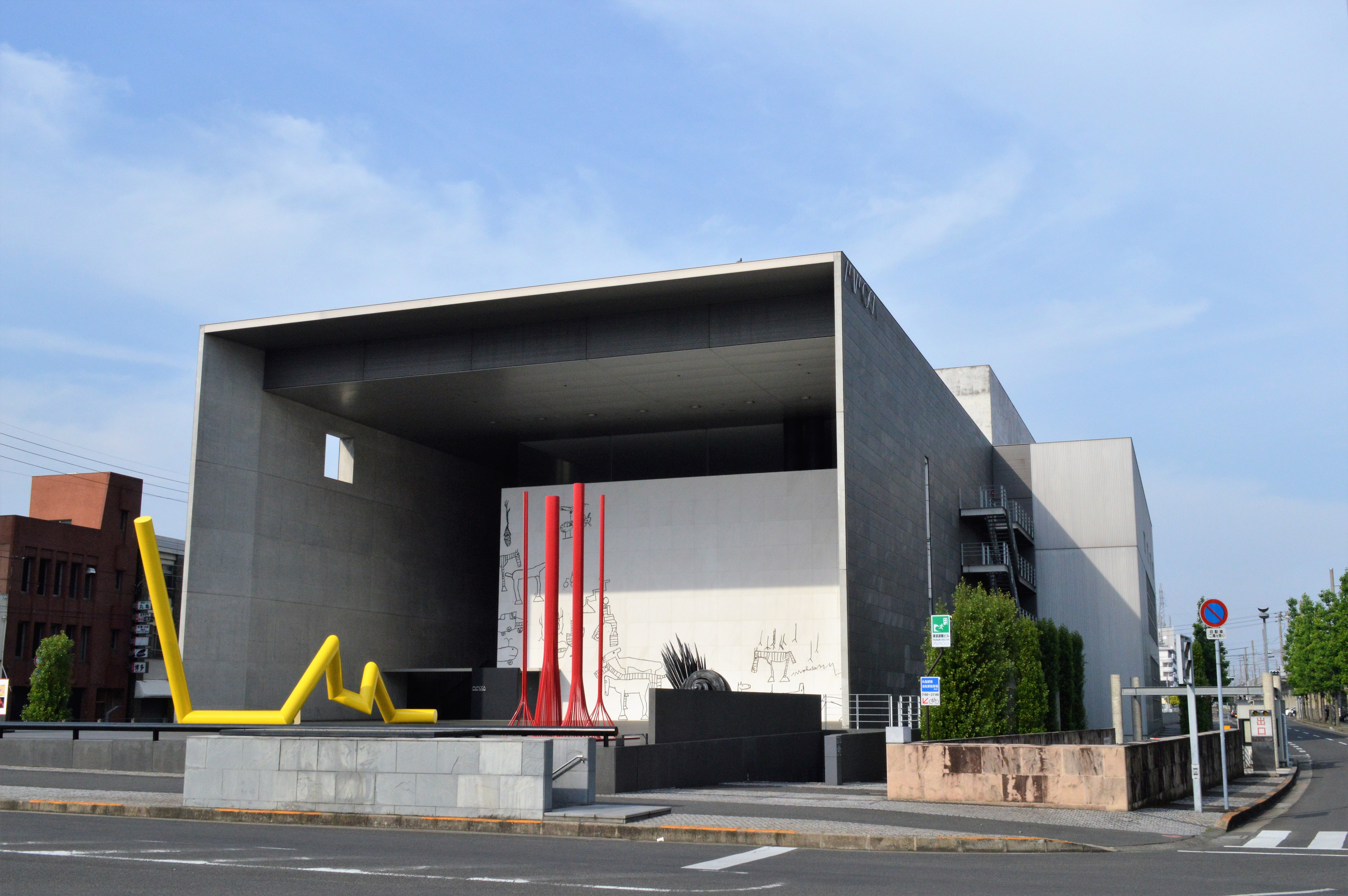
- Interactive map of the Marugame Genichiro-Inokuma Museum of Contemporary Art area

General information
- Location: 80-1 Hama-machi, Marugame, Kagawa Prefecture, Japan
- Coordinates: 34°17′28″N 133°47′32″E
- Opened: 23 November 1991

Design and construction
- Architect: Yoshio Taniguchi

Website
- Official website

Marugame Genichiro-Inokuma Museum of Contemporary Art (丸亀市猪熊弦一郎現代美術館, Marugame-shi Inokuma Genichirō Gendai Bijutsukan) (MIMOCA) opened in Marugame, Kagawa Prefecture, Japan, in 1991. Architect Yoshio Taniguchi designed the museum building. The museum collection comprises some twenty thousand works donated by artist Gen’ichirō Inokuma. Special exhibitions of works by other contemporary artists are also staged.

== See also ==
- Kagawa Prefectural Higashiyama Kaii Setouchi Art Museum
- Marugame Castle
