= Matazō Kayama =

Japanese artist (1927–2004)

- Born: 1927; Kyoto, Empire of Japan
- Died: 2004 (aged 76–77); Japan
- Education: Tokyo University of the Arts
- Known for: Painting, Sculpture, Printmaking
- Movement: Nihonga, Cubism

Matazō Kayama (加山 又造, Kayama Matazō) was a Japanese Nihonga painter of the 20th century, born in Kyoto in 1927.

== Biography ==
Kayama Matazo was a painter who employed a mixed technique. In 1949, he graduated from the Tokyo University of the Arts with a degree in painting. Around 1960 he traveled, gave exhibitions, and held conferences abroad. Starting in 1950, he participated in expositions of Sōzō Bijutsu (創造美術), which merged into Shinseisaku in 1951, where he was awarded four times through 1955.

From 1958 on, he participated in international expositions of modern Japanese artists. In 1967, he also participated in the exhibition Masterpieces of Modern Japanese Painting at the State Hermitage Museum of Saint Petersburg and at the Pushkin Museum in Moscow. In 1957, he was granted the Young Painters Prize in the Asahi News. In 1973 he was granted the prize for Japanese Art and, in 1980, he received the Prize of the Ministry of Culture. He became a professor at the Tokyo University of the Arts in 1988.

== Technique ==
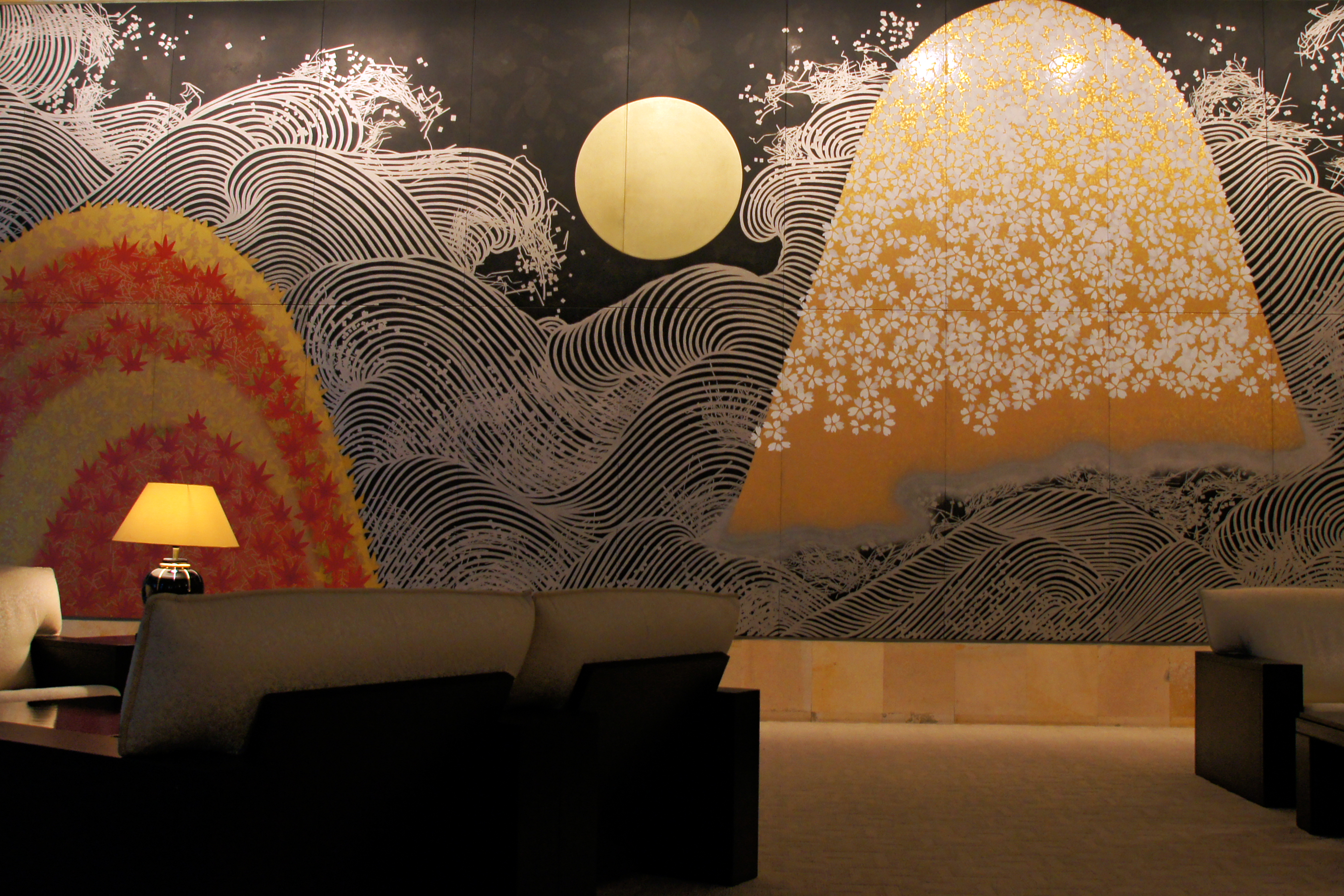
Artwork in the Owani Onsen in Aomori

His works give the impression of a cross between a painting and a photograph. In 1950, he began to incorporate discrete elements of cubism, as well as elements of Italian futurism in his series of paintings focused on birds and other animals. In 1964, he conceived a ceramic mural for the Taiseki-ji Temple of Fujinomiya. He also conceived a stone Pagoda for the Jindai-ji Temple in 1974, in homage to his late friend Yokoyama Misao (1920). Towards the end of the 1970s, several state organizations commissioned him to make mural decorations, including the Japanese Embassy in the United States.

== Bibliography ==
- Busse, Jacques; Bénézit, E. (1999). Dictionnaire critique et documentaire des peintres, sculpteurs, dessinateurs et graveurs de tous les temps et de tous les pays (in French). Paris: Gründ. ISBN 2-7000-3010-9. OCLC 48989344.
