= D. T. Suzuki Museum =

- 鈴木大拙館
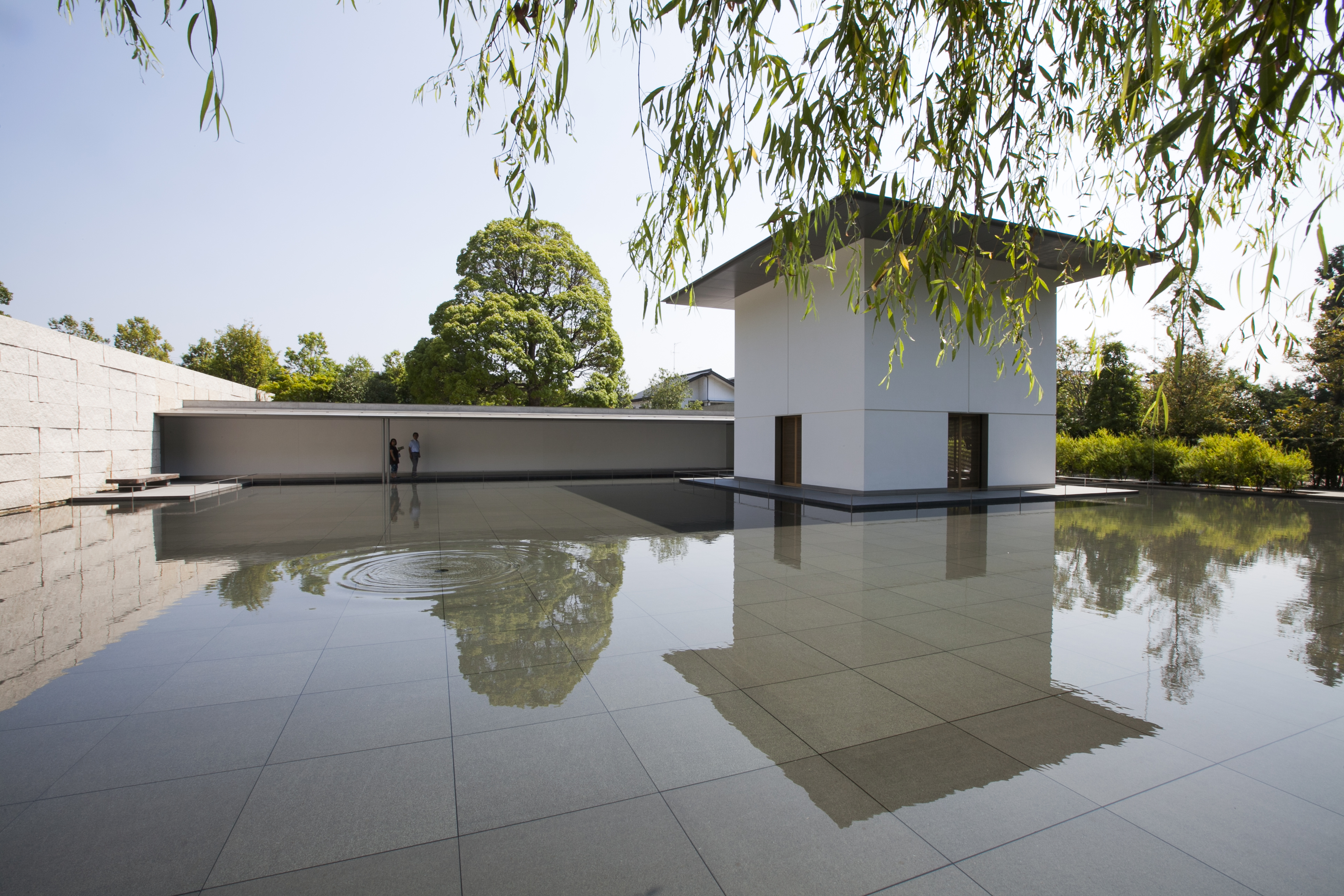
- Water Mirror Garden
- Interactive map of the D. T. Suzuki Museum area

General information
- Location: 3-4-20 Honda-machi, Kanazawa, Ishikawa Prefecture, Japan
- Coordinates: 36°33′28″N 136°39′40″E
- Opened: 18 October 2011

Technical details
- Floor area: 631.63 square metres (6,798.8 sq ft)

Design and construction
- Architect: Yoshio Taniguchi

Website
- Official website

The D. T. Suzuki Museum (鈴木大拙館, Suzuki Daisetsu Kan) opened in Kanazawa, Ishikawa Prefecture, Japan in 2011. Dedicated to the life, writings, and ideas of Kanazawa-born Buddhist philosopher D. T. Suzuki, the facility, designed by Yoshio Taniguchi, includes a contemplative space overlooking the Water Mirror Garden.

== See also ==
- An Introduction to Zen Buddhism
- Ishikawa Prefectural History Museum
- Ishikawa Prefectural Museum of Art
- 21st Century Museum of Contemporary Art, Kanazawa
- Kenroku-en
