= Texas Asia Society =

Asia Society Texas Center
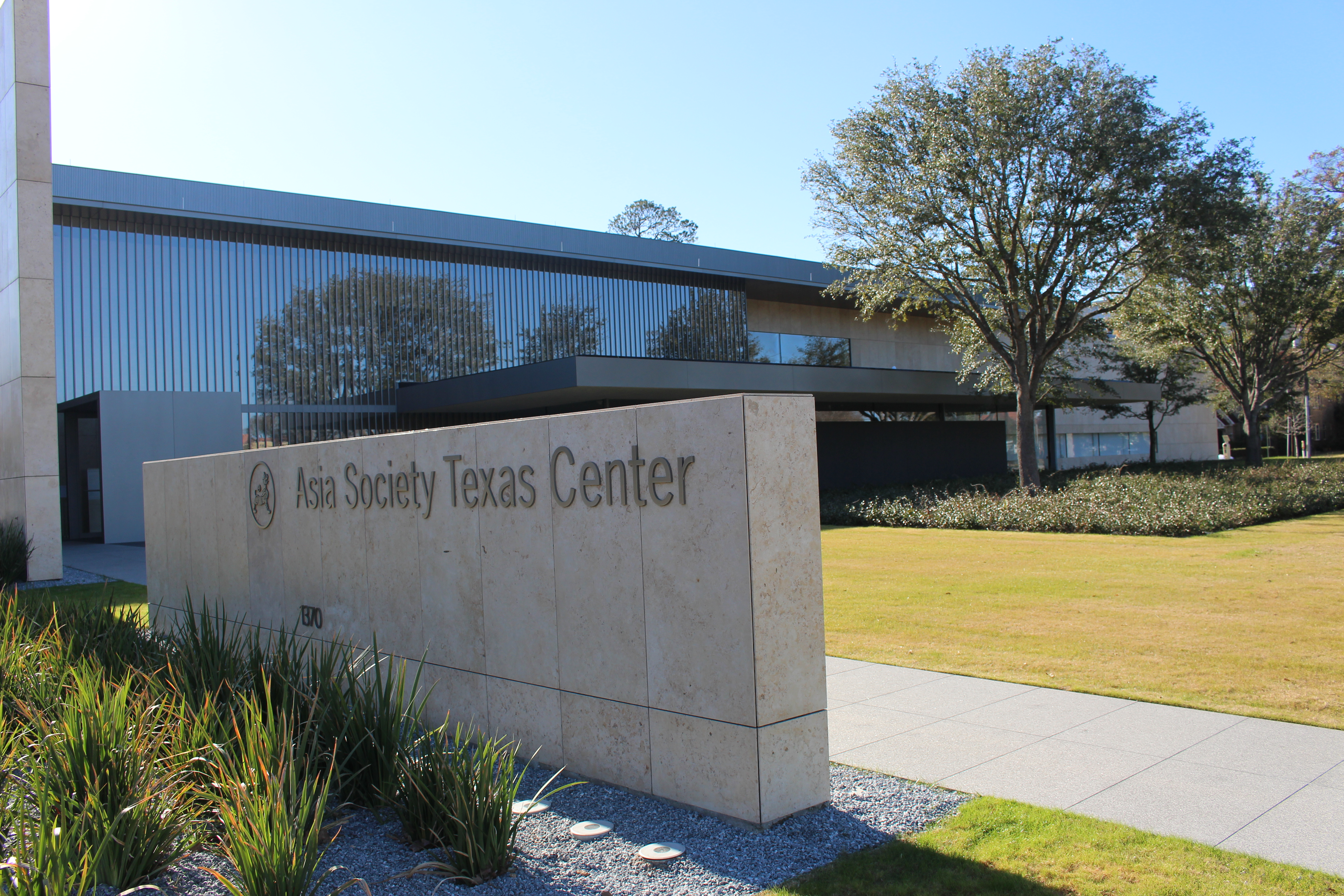
- Houston, Texas; United States

Information
- Established: 1979
- Website: www.asiasociety.org/texas

The Texas Asia Society, also known as Asia Society Texas Center, is one of the twelve centers of Asia Society, founded in 1979 and located in Houston, Texas. This society strengthens relationships between Americans and the peoples, leaders, and institutions of Asia. The Texas Asia Society hosts public programs and exhibitions to increase knowledge of Asia, enhance dialogue, and generate new ideas across the fields of art and culture, business, and education.

== Mission ==
The Texas Asia Society is the leading educational organization dedicated to promoting Asian culture among the peoples, leaders, and institutions of Asia and the United States. Asia society focuses on art, business, culture, and education.

== History ==
First Lady Barbara Bush and former Ambassador Roy M. Huffington established Texas Asia Society in 1979. They recognized the need to educate Americans about Asia and to make stronger connections between Houston and the peoples and institutions of Asia. In 1995 the Texas Center’s board of directors voted to build a home for its programs and activities. The Board selected Japanese architect Yoshio Taniguchi, best known in this country for his renovation and expansion of the Museum of Modern Art in New York, to design the building, located in Houston’s Museum District. The building was completed in early fall 2011. The building featured a Performing Arts Theater, a Gallery, an Education Center, and more. It was open to the public on April 14, 2012. With the opening of the Center, Asia Society takes its place as a major educational and cultural institution in the region, the driving force in transforming Houston into an Asia-Pacific city.

== Architecture ==
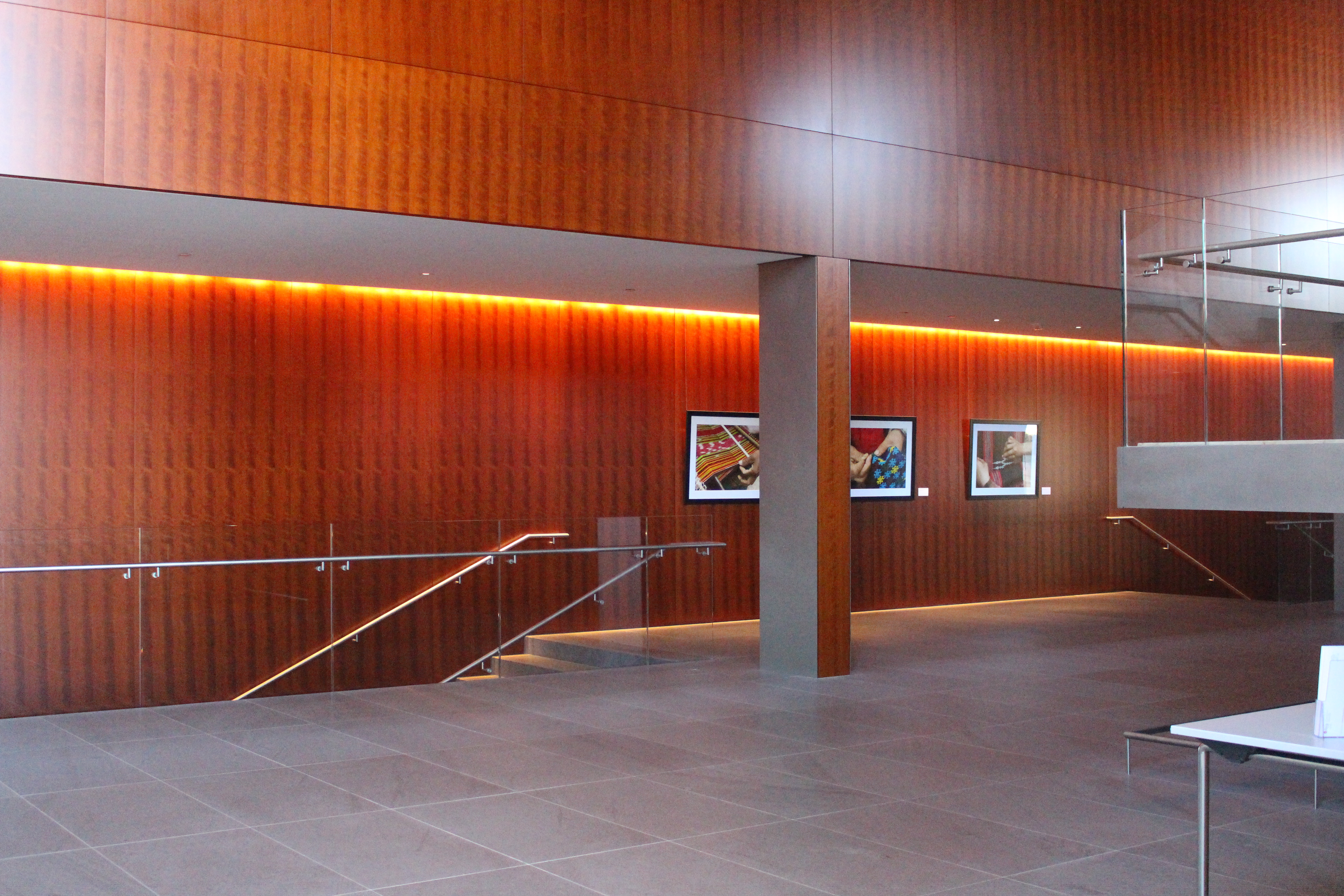
Cherry Wood Walls

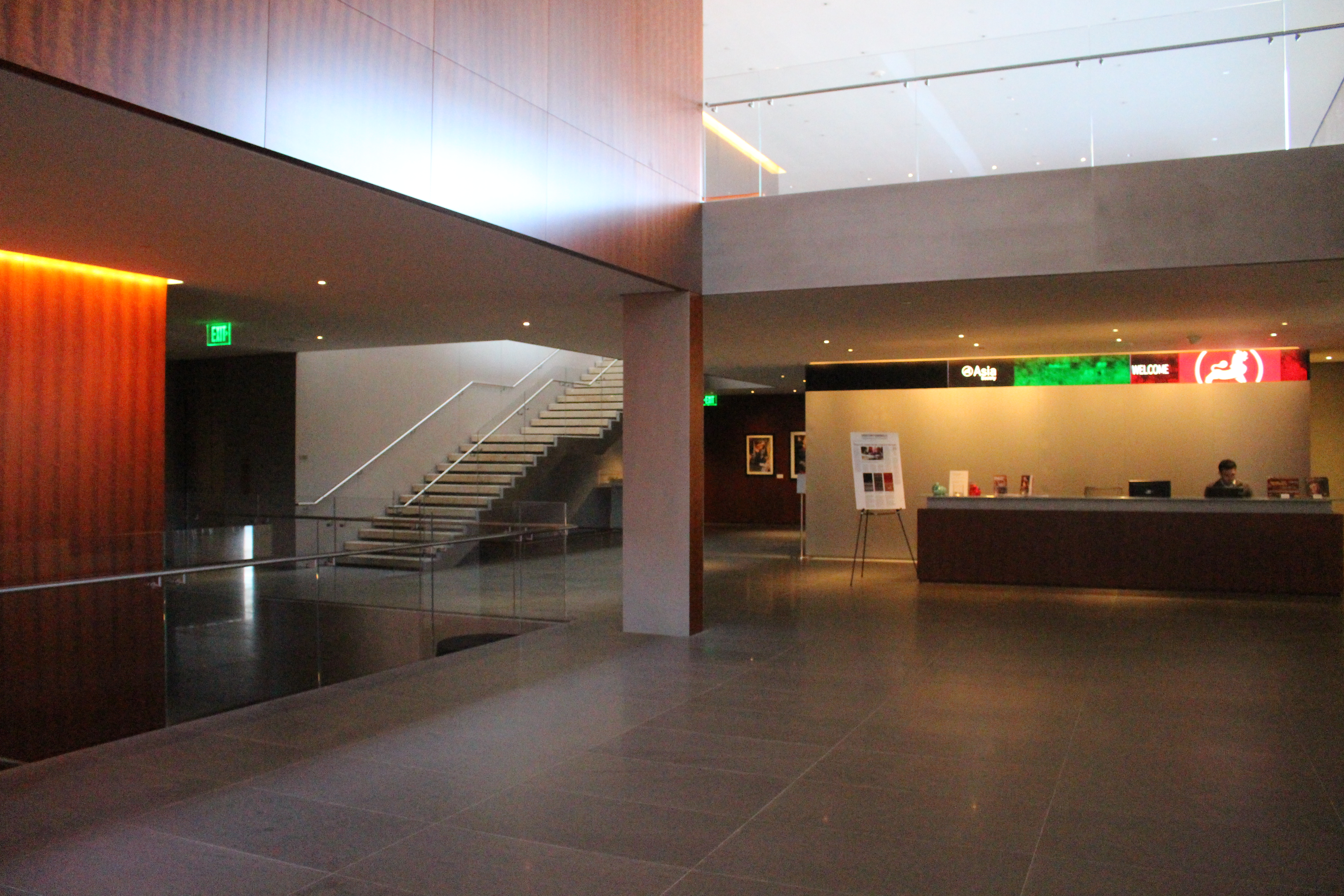
Front Lobby

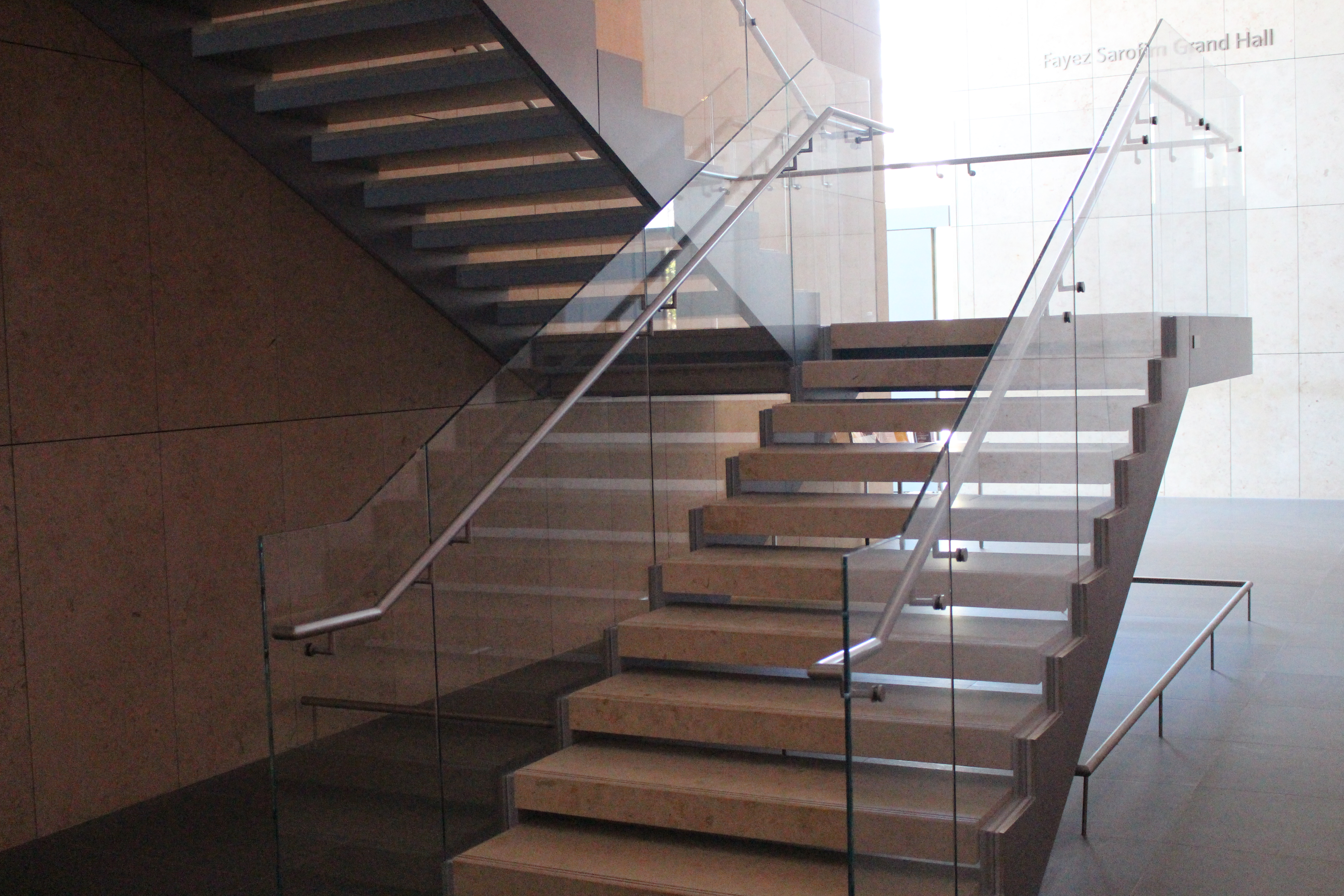
Stairs

Asia Society Texas Center was designed by Yoshio Taniguchi, a Japan-born student from Harvard. The building combines modern design with the serenity associated with Asia. Its 40,000 square feet is spread over two stories and basement, resulting in a profile that fits well into its residential surroundings. Yet the building immediately draws the eye – first by the grace of its lines, then by the materials and workmanship that went into its making.

In 2003 the Texas Center purchased a 2.3-acre building site in the neighborhood that includes the Museum of Fine Arts, Houston, Contemporary Arts Museum Houston and other major cultural institutions. The following year the block-size property across the street was purchased for parking. In 2004, with the selection of Taniguchi, the project moved into high gear. Construction on the $48.4 million building began in January 2010 and by fall 2011 was complete.

For his first standalone building in the United States – previously he was recognised for his expansion and renovation of the Museum of Modern Art in New York – Taniguchi. The building features a combination of stone, wood, and glass

=== Jura Limestone ===
Jura Limestone is the main material used for the exterior and interior walls. In order to find 50 blocks of acceptable material, the limestone had to be from the Jurassic geological period, which ended 150 million years ago. Mr. Tanaguchi used this material in many of his projects, but 90 percent of the stone that came in was rejected by Mr. Tanaguchi.

=== American Cherry Wood ===
American Cherry Wood provides the wall paneling in the Fayez Sarofim Grand Hall and the Brown Foundation Performing Arts Theater. The wood was chosen for its rich color, beauty and warmth. Paneling in the Grand Hall is from a single North American cherry tree over 100 years old. It was selected for its deep color and fine grain.

=== Basaltina Italian Stone ===
Basaltina Italian Stone flooring on the ground level was quarried an hour north of Rome. Basaltina is a volcanic stone used for centuries; the ancient Romans used it to build roads and monuments. Basalts have the consistent coloration, markings and subtlety of limestone and the durability of granite. It is aged through a natural process so it can be honed and polished. Admiring its unique gray tone, Taniguchi has used it in many of his buildings.

== Education ==
=== Student tours ===
The Texas Asia Society invites students and teachers to their center, providing them with many educational opportunities for students to learn about Asian art, culture, and traditions.

The Education Department staff provide tours of the exhibitions in the Louisa Stude Sarofim Gallery, PowerPoint presentations emphasizing important information about Asian art, culture, geography, and politics, explanation of the Texas Center and its unique architecture, and art-making activities in the Edward Rudge Aleen III Education Center.

=== Educator workshops ===
The Asia Society Texas Center Educator Night series combines a two-hour workshop with a performing or visual arts experience. Designed for K–12 and university instructors, these trainings give educators a greater understanding of Asian art, culture, economics, government, music, and theater.

=== Family programs ===
Held at Asia Society Texas Center throughout the year, Family Days give audiences of all ages the chance to learn more about Asian culture through demonstrations, exhibits, performances, and storytelling. Families may create crafts together, learn about Asian games and holidays, or have their faces painted with Asian-themed decorations.

== Business ==
Asia Society is a forum for ideas. They host business leaders, diplomats, government officials, and policy experts addressing the whole range of public issues affecting Asia and the rest of the world. They convene and connect, providing Houston business, academic, and civil leaders, as well as the interested general public, with useful, thought-provoking analysis of developments in Asia that impact Texas and the Gulf Coast region.

Houston's ties with Asia are strong. Asia is a vital part of the energy industry. East Asia trade is a growing market for the port of Houston. Houston must continue to have links with the Asia Pacific region if it is to thrive. Furthermore, the Texas Center wants to be Houston's gateway to Asia.
