= Yoshio Taniguchi =

Japanese architect (1937–2024)

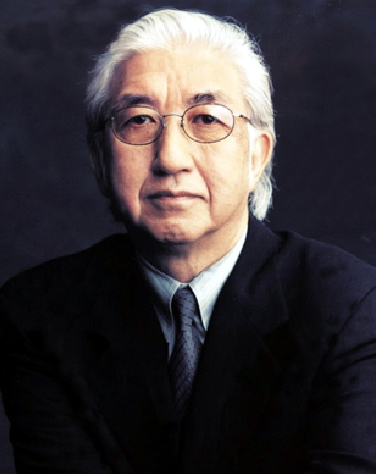
- Yoshio Taniguchi
- Born: 17 October 1937; Empire of Japan
- Died: 16 December 2024 (aged 87)
- Education: Harvard Graduate School of Design
- Occupation: Architect
- Parent: Yoshirō Taniguchi (father)
- Awards: Praemium Imperiale (2005); Person of Cultural Merit (2021)
- Buildings: Museum of Modern Art (2004 redesign); Nagano Prefectural Museum of History; Marugame Genichiro-Inokuma Museum of Contemporary Art; Toyota Municipal Museum of Art; D. T. Suzuki Museum

Yoshio Taniguchi (谷口 吉生, Taniguchi Yoshio; 17 October 1937 – 16 December 2024) was a Japanese architect best known for his redesign of the Museum of Modern Art in New York City, which was reopened on 20 November 2004. Critics have emphasized Taniguchi's fusion of traditional Japanese and Modernist aesthetics. Martin Filler, writing in The New York Times, praised "the luminous physicality and calm aura of Taniguchi's buildings," noting that the architect "sets his work apart by exploiting the traditional Japanese strategies of clarity, understatement, opposition, asymmetry and proportion." "In an era of glamorously expressionist architecture," wrote Time critic Richard Lacayo, MoMA "has opted for a work of what you might call old-fashioned Modernism, clean-lined and rectilinear, a subtly updated version of the glass-and-steel box that the museum first championed in the 1930s, years before that style was adopted for corporate headquarters everywhere."

== Biography ==
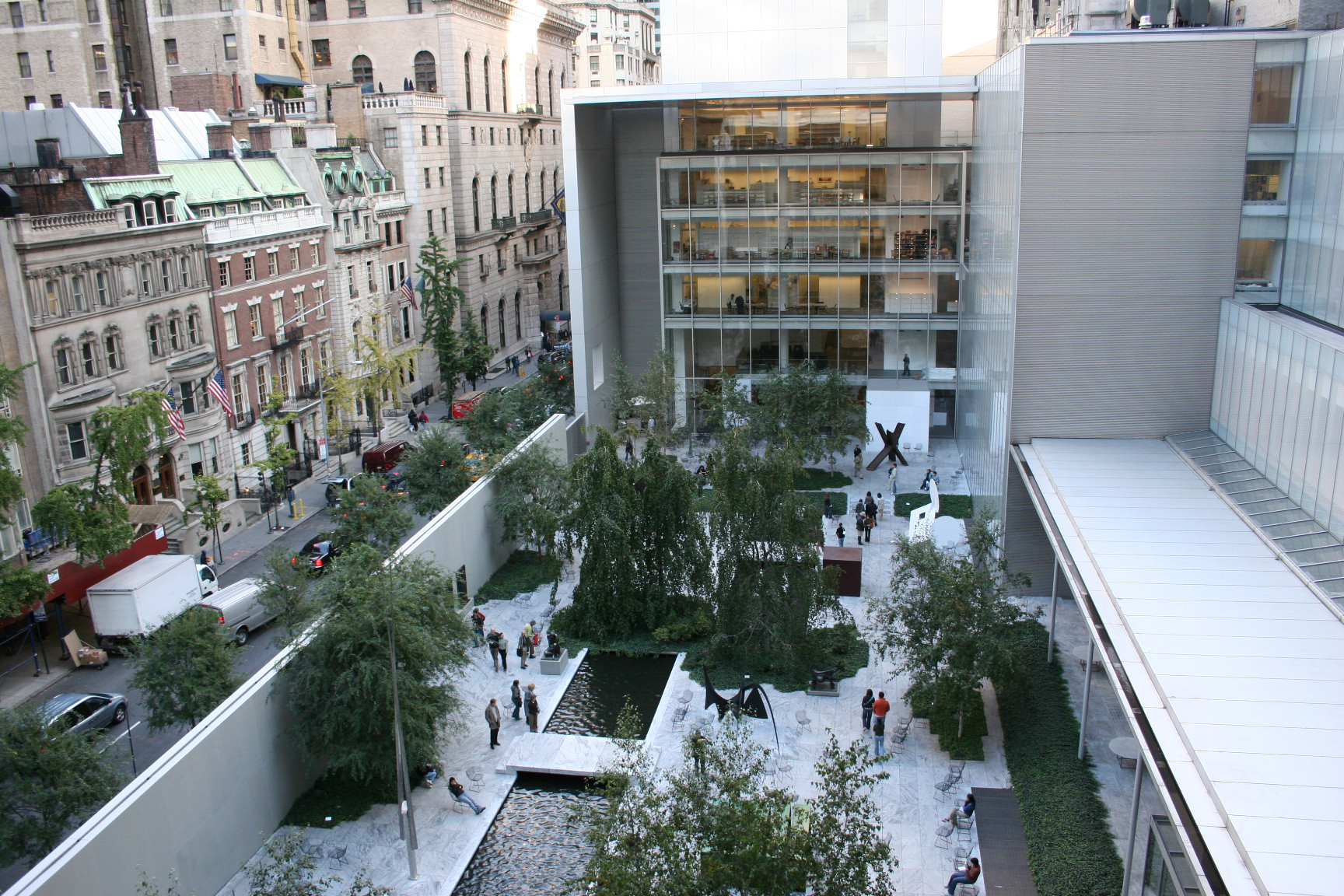
MOMA New York Courtyard, from the Café 5 terrace after remodel by architect Yoshio Taniguchi

Taniguchi was the son of architect Yoshirō Taniguchi (1904–1979), who designed the National Museum of Modern Art in Tokyo. Yoshio studied engineering at Keio University, graduating in 1960, after which he studied architecture at Harvard University's Graduate School of Design, graduating in 1964. He worked briefly for architect Walter Gropius, who became an important influence.

From 1964 to 1972, Taniguchi worked for the studio of architect Kenzō Tange, perhaps the most important Japanese modernist architect, at Tokyo University. While in the Tange office, Taniguchi also worked on projects in Skopje, Yugoslavia and San Francisco, California (Yerba Buena), living on Telegraph Avenue in Berkeley while involved in the latter project. Taniguchi taught architecture at the University of California, Los Angeles, then, in 1975, established his own practice, in Tokyo. Since 1979, he has been president of Taniguchi and Associates.

Among his noteworthy later collaborators are Isamu Noguchi, the American landscape architect Peter Walker, and the artist Gen'ichirō Inokuma.

Taniguchi is best known for designing a number of Japanese museums, including the Nagano Prefectural Museum of History, the Marugame Genichiro-Inokuma Museum of Contemporary Art, the Toyota Municipal Museum of Art, the D. T. Suzuki Museum (鈴木大拙館, Suzuki Daisetsu Kan) in Kanazawa, and the Gallery of the Hōryū-ji Treasures at the Tokyo National Museum.

In 1997, Taniguchi won a competition to redesign the Museum of Modern Art, beating out nine other internationally renowned architects, including Rem Koolhaas, Bernard Tschumi, and Jacques Herzog and Pierre de Meuron. The MoMA commission was Taniguchi's first work outside Japan. Writing in the Los Angeles Times, Suzanne Muchnic highlighted Taniguchi's "ability to create beautiful spaces that function effectively," in this case enabling museumgoers to find their bearings in a building whose sheer size and labyrinthine galleries and hallways can be disorienting. "The streamlined lobby has entrances at both ends, while the central atrium — or 'light garden,' as Taniguchi prefers — provides glimpses of upper floors," she writes. "Off to one side, the garden and a stairway are immediately apparent. On upper floors, bridges connect old and new parts of the building. Glass barriers around the atrium provide dramatic views within the museum. ... 'I wanted to direct people visually, not with signs,' said Taniguchi, who cut openings in walls to show their thickness and to expose what lies behind them. 'In big European museums it is easy to get lost,' he said. 'You get tired visually and physically. In this museum, I intentionally created places where people can locate themselves. This is a modern way of thinking — expressing function, not hiding.'"

Taniguchi designed the Texas Asia Society Center in Houston. This $40 million project is located in the Houston Museum District and is Taniguchi's only freestanding new building in the United States.

== Death ==
Yoshio Taniguchi died from pneumonia on 16 December 2024, at the age of 87.

== Awards ==
- 2005: Praemium Imperiale
- 2021: Person of Cultural Merit

== Gallery of works ==
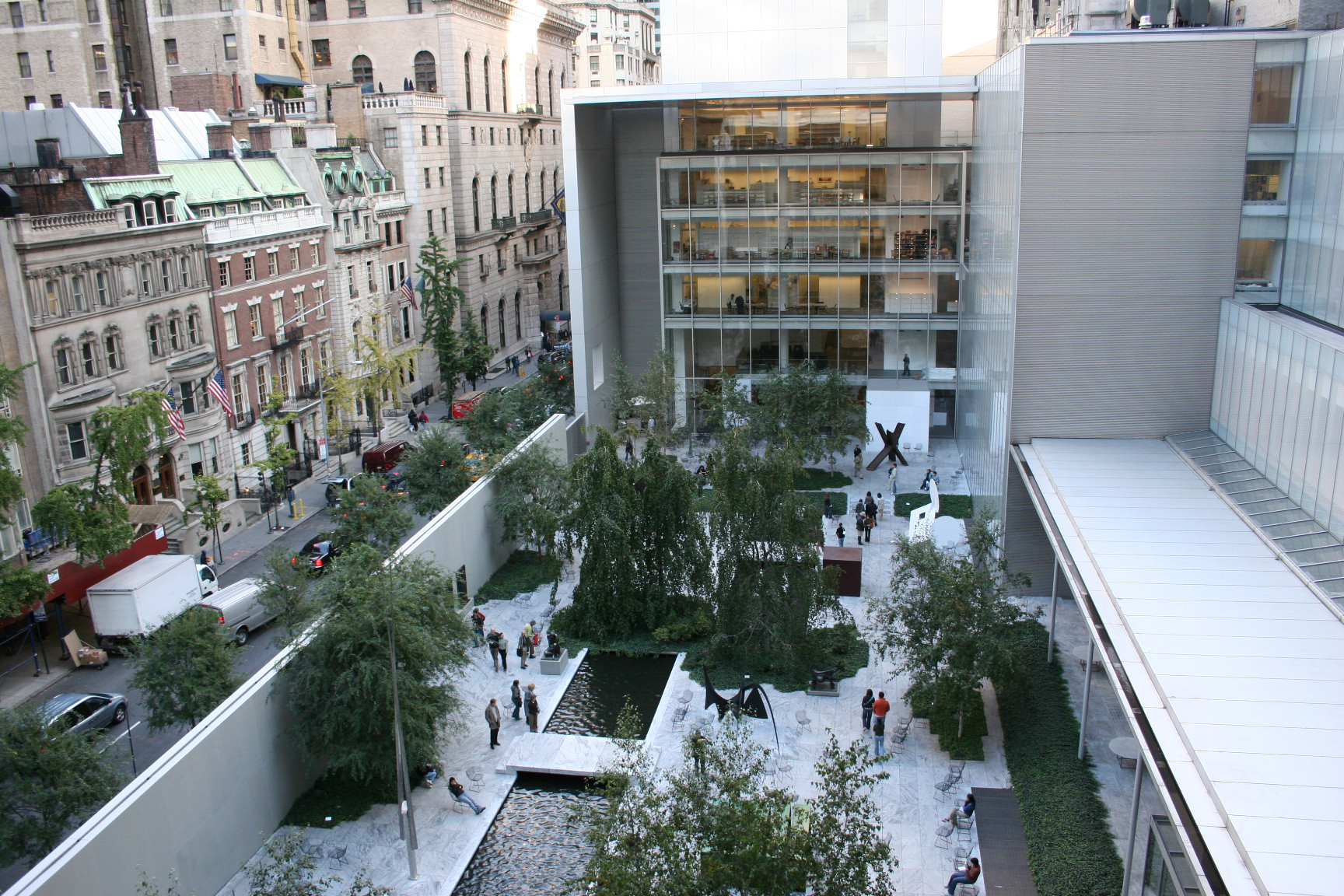
MoMA, New York

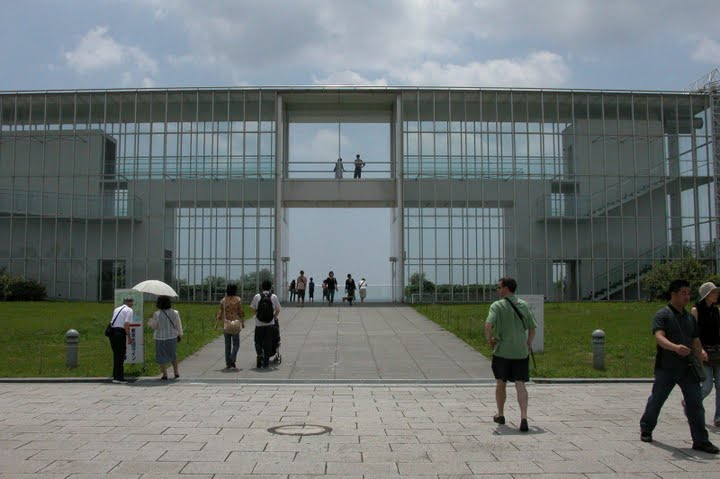
Tokyo Sea Life Park, Tokyo

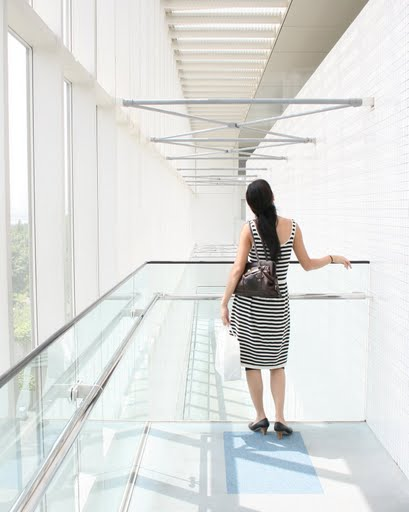
Tokyo Sea Life Park, Tokyo

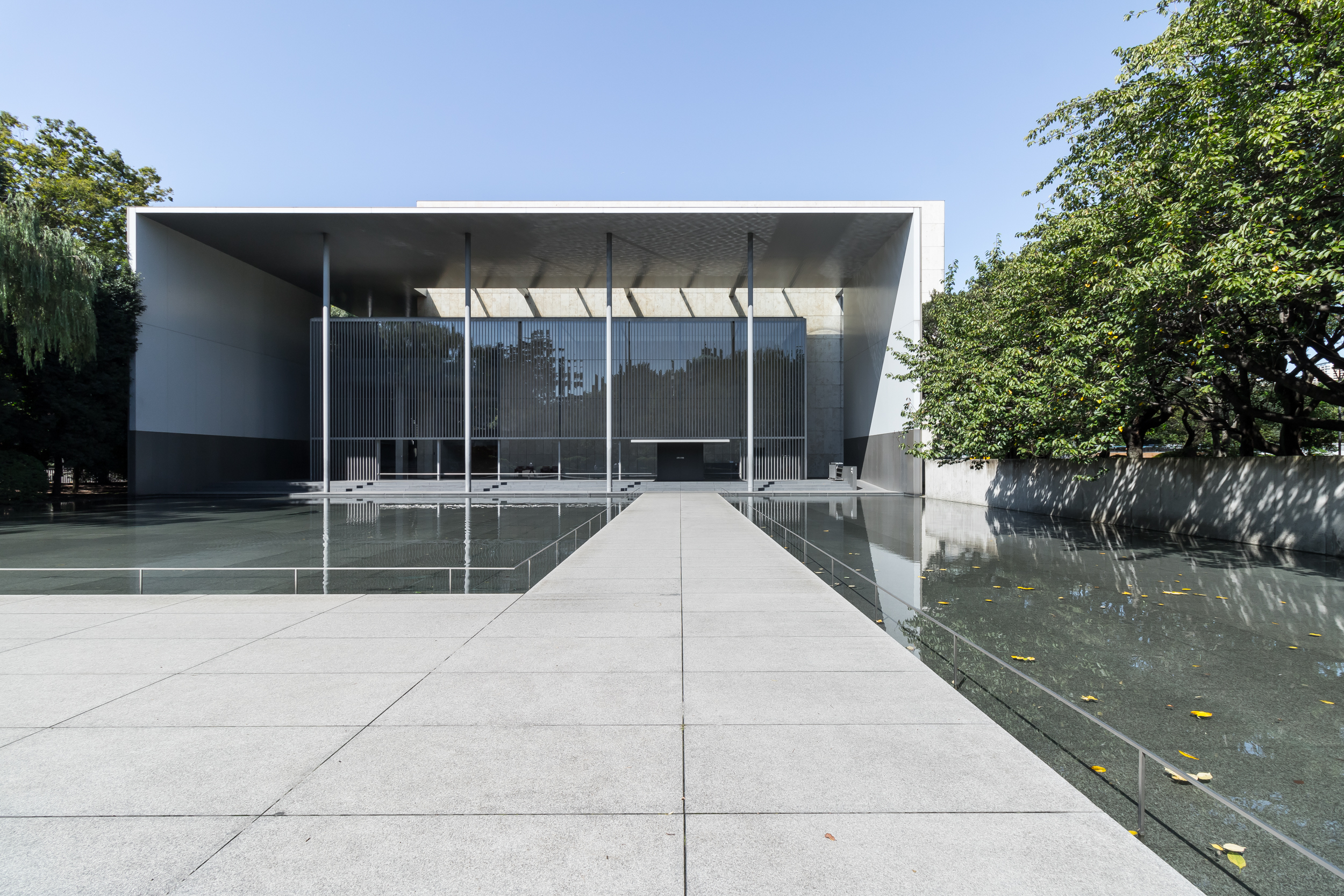
The Gallery of Horyuji Treasures, Tokyo

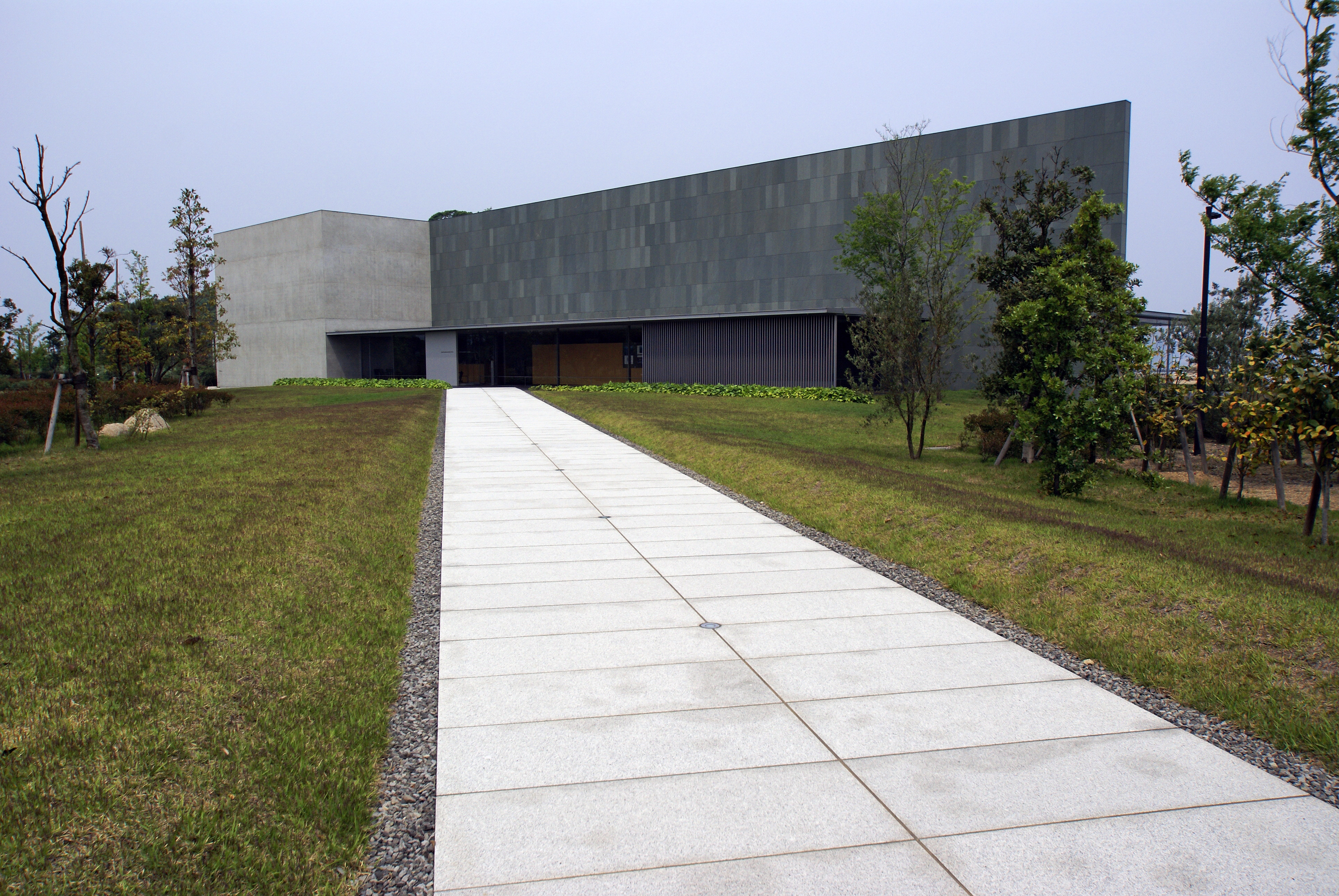
Kagawa Prefectural Higashiyama Kaii Setouchi Art Museum, Sakaide
