= Kagawa Prefectural Higashiyama Kaii Setouchi Art Museum =

Museum in Sakaide, Japan

- 香川県立東山魁夷せとうち美術館
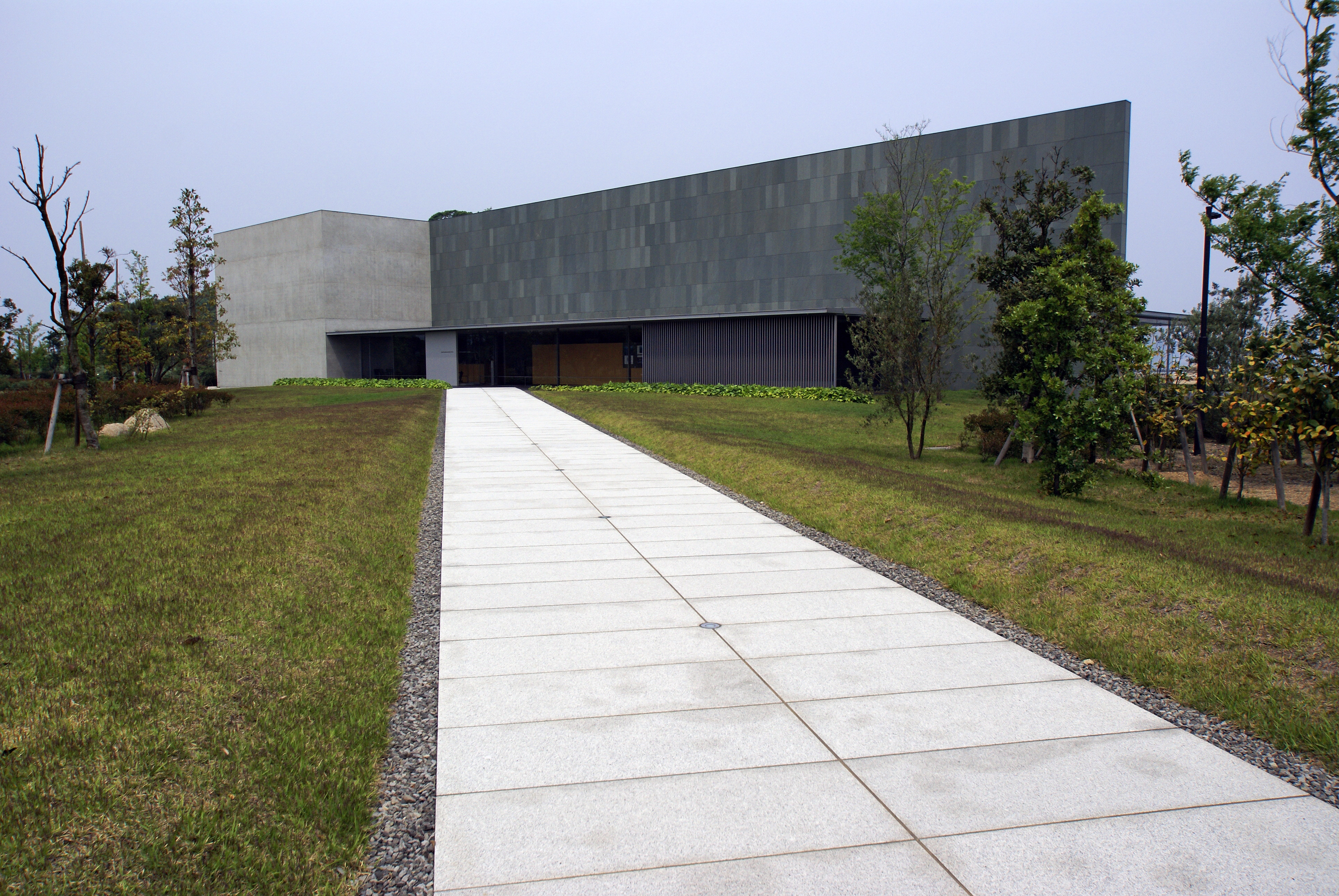
- Interactive map of the Kagawa Prefectural Higashiyama Kaii Setouchi Art Museum area

General information
- Location: Sakaide, Kagawa Prefecture, Japan
- Coordinates: 34.3495°N 133.8242°E
- Opened: April 2005

Design and construction
- Architect: Yoshio Taniguchi

Website
- Official website

Kagawa Prefectural Higashiyama Kaii Setouchi Art Museum (Japanese: 香川県立東山魁夷せとうち美術館, romanized: Kagawa Kenritsu Higashiyama Kaii Setouchi Bijutsukan) is an art museum dedicated to Japanese painting master Kaii Higashiyama. The museum is located in the city of Sakaide, Kagawa Prefecture, Japan, where Higashiyama's grandfather was born. The museum features 350 works by Higashiyama that were donated by his wife after he died.

The museum was designed by famed architect Yoshio Taniguchi and opened in Sakaide in 2005. It is located near the Great Seto Bridge.

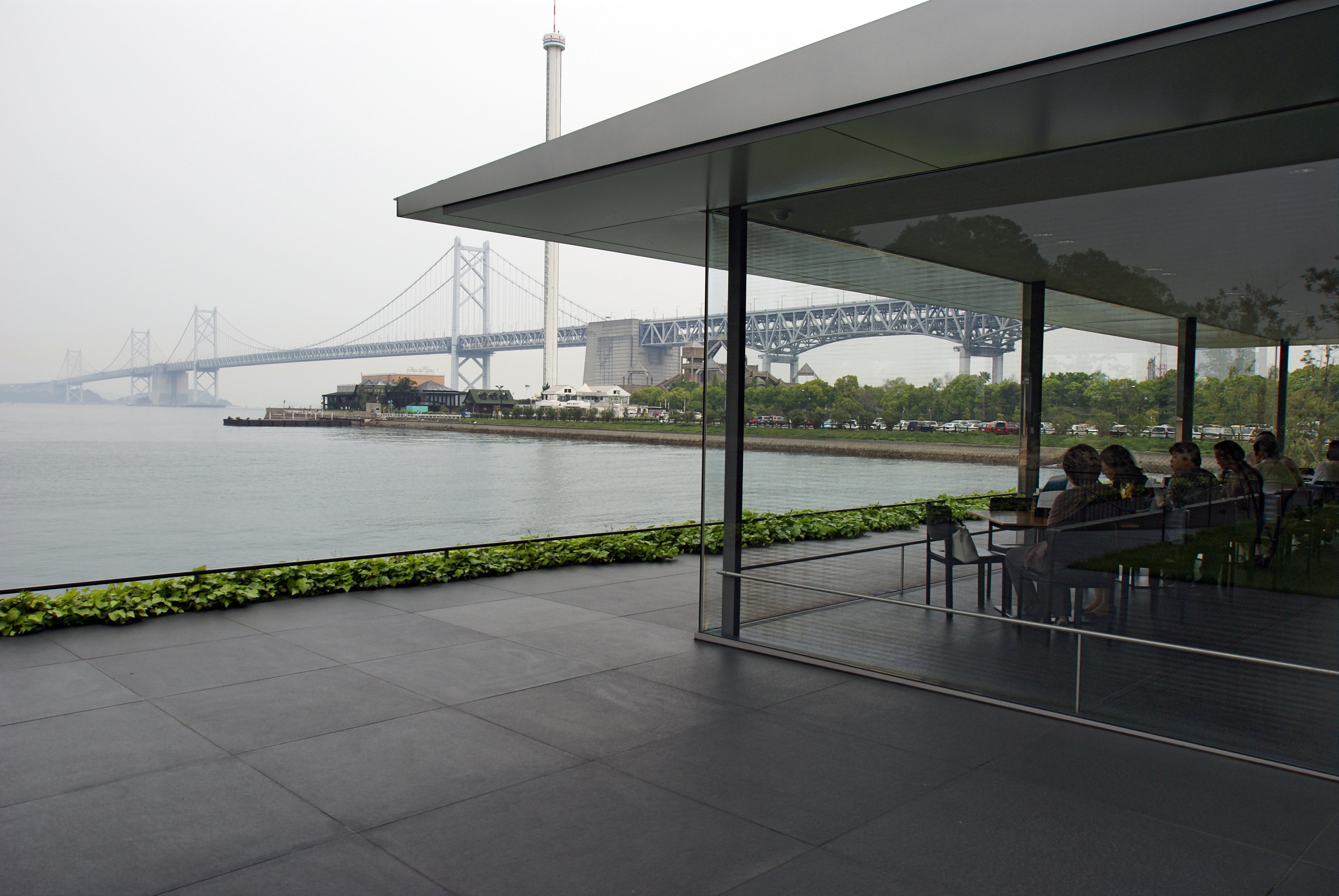
Great Seto Bridge from the museum

== Access ==
The museum is a 15-minute bus ride from Sakaide Station.
