= Madokoro Akutagawa Saori =

Japanese artist (1924–1966)

- Born: Saori Yamada; 24 May 1924; Toyohashi, Aichi, Japan
- Died: 31 January 1966 (aged 41)
- Movement: Avant-Garde
- Spouse(s): Yasushi Akutagawa (m. 1946–1958) Yukio Madokoro (m. 1961)

Madokoro Akutagawa Saori (芥川 (間所) 紗織, Akutagawa (Madokoro) Saori; 1924–31 January 1966) was a Japanese painter whose works were often associated with primitivism, folkloric and mythological subjects, as well as unique dyeing techniques. Her paintings from the 1950s manifest various themes from distorted and dramatic portrayal of women to divine narratives based on traditional Japanese folklore. After briefly studying and living in the US, Akutagawa shifted her artistic exploration towards abstraction before her death at a young age in 1966.

== Early life and education ==
Saori (Madokoro) Akutagawa was born the eldest daughter of Taichi and Mura Yamada in Toyohashi, Aichi Prefecture in 1924. After graduating from Tokyo Prefectural Second High School for Girls, she went on to study vocal performance at the Tokyo College of Music (now Tokyo University of the Arts). While she was in school in 1946, she married a fellow student of hers, composer Yasushi Akutagawa. Since her days in the girls' school, Akutagawa had been interested in drawing and painting, but had paused her visual arts practice temporarily during college to focus on music. However, despite having graduated from college, Akutagawa's family as well as her husband remained reluctant in supporting her to have a musical career. They had 2 daughters.

Beginning in the early 1950s, she began learning ikebana, silk dyeing, and made a return to painting. She studied wax dyeing with Michikata Noguchi and oil painting at the institute of Genichiro Inokuma. During this time, the artist was also strongly inspired by Yoshishige Saito.

== Career in Japan ==
In 1953, at the suggestion of Keiko Akana, a classmate from the girls' school, Akutagawa submitted her work to the New Production Association Exhibition (新制作協会展), but the work was not selected. In 1954, she began participating in the Yomiuri Indépendant Exhibition and the Modern Art Exhibition (モダンアート展). In the same year, Akutagawa had her first solo exhibition at the Yoseido Gallery in Ginza, when Shuzo Takiguchi wrote an article recommending the exhibition and Akutagawa, through her debut show, gained reputation as a promising newcomer in the art world.

In 1955, invited by Taro Okamoto, Akutagawa joined the Nika-kai, and exhibited her dye paintings Onagawa (女川), Onna VI (女 VI, Woman VI), Onna XI (女 XI, Woman XI), and Izanagi no Mikoto no Kunizukuri (イザナギ ノミコトの国造り) in the Room Nine gallery, then under the auspice of Taro Okamoto at the 40th Nika Exhibition. At that time, the artist used the technique of painting with wax dyes to create vivid imagery that manifests a series of semi-abstract portraits. She produced a series of works, mostly titled Onna, focusing on women's faces, laughing, angry, crying, and confused. Later on, she worked with the birth of gods and the grand legend of the nation's creation, based on Japanese folklore and mythology.

In September 1955, the Tokyo National Museum held the Mexican Art Exhibition (メキシコ美術展), which greatly impressed Akutagawa. Around that time, Akutagawa encountered the works of Rufino Tamayo on the pages of an art magazine and was intrigued by how Tamayo's vibrant palette as well as how the Mexican painter successfully employed historic and folk subjects and meanwhile still were able to engage with the contemporary audience.

In the 1950s, Akugatawa's dye paintings were exhibited at various venues. Teikyū suru susa noomikoto (涕泣する須佐之男命) was exhibited at the 4th Peace Art Exhibition (平和美術展). Kamigami no tanjō: Shiwa yori (神々の誕生: 神話より, From a Myth: the Birth of Gods, 1956) was included in the 41st Nika Exhibition. Hachihyaku-kami no hakugai (八百神の迫害, Persecution of Eight Hundred Gods) was selected to be in the World·Today's Art Exhibition at Takashimaya Department Store in Nihonbashi, Tokyo. In 1957, in the second edition of the Exhibition of Four Artists (with Tatsuo Ikeda, On Kawara, Taizo Yoshinaka) at Muramatsu Gallery, Akutagawa exhibited multiple works including Nihonbuson no dokugyo taiji (日本武尊の毒魚退治) and Shiwa yori 4: Minwa yori ten kakeru (神話より(4)民話より天かける, From a Myth 4: Flying in the Air, 1956). Also at Muramatsu Gallery in the same year, the third solo exhibition of Akugatawa featured Kojikiyori (古事記より), which culminated a series of mythological works.

== Career in the United States ==
In April 1958, Saori Akutagawa divorced Yasushi Akutagawa. In September 1959, the artist departed for the US and studied graphic design at the ArtCenter School in Los Angeles until 1960, before moving to New York. In New York, she participated in the Japan-America Women Painters Exhibition at the Riverside Art Museum under her maiden name, Saori Yamada. Women artists such as Yuki Katsura and Yayoi Kusama were also included in that exhibition. In 1961, Akutagawa studied oil painting under Will Barnet at the Art Students League in New York and thereafter, abandoned dye painting in favour of oil painting in order to create a more organic, abstracted presentation of the human body. In 1961, she married Yukio Madokoro, an architect with whom she had travelled to the United States.

== Later years ==
In the spring of 1962, Akutagawa returned to Japan and exhibited works created in the US in her fourth solo exhibition at the Showa Gallery in Kyoto. Some of the works were also on view at the 17th Women Artists Association Exhibition.

Saori Akutagawa died from eclampsia on 31 January 1966 at the age of 42. During the years before her death, Akutagawa was developing a new direction of painting that pursued forms with limited colours such as red and black, vermillion and mauve.

== Exhibition History ==
=== Solo Exhibition ===
- 1954 Yoseido Gallery, Ginza, Tokyo
- 1955 Muramatsu Gallery, Tokyo
- 1957 Muramatsu Gallery, Tokyo
- 1962 Showa Gallery, Kyoto
- 1966 1st posthumous solo exhibition, Muramatsu Gallery, Tokyo
- 1973 Tokyo Central Museum of Art
- 1999 Saori Akutagawa Retrospective Exhibition: Gentle, Intense, and Brilliant, Gallery PAZWorld
- 2002 Saori Akutagawa's Art, Nagoya City Museum
- 2008 Vibrant Colors, Unrestrained Image: Saori Akutagawa Exhibition, Yokosuka Museum of Art

=== Group Exhibition ===
- 1954 6th Yomiuri Indépendant Exhibition & 4th Modern Art Exhibition
- 1955 7th Yomiuri Indépendant Exhibition & 5th Modern Art Exhibition (won the Newcomer's Prize, 新人賞) & 40th Nika Exhibition & New Artists of Today: 1955 Exhibition, Museum of Modern Art, Kanagawa
- 1956 8th Yomiuri Indépendant Exhibition & 41st Nika Exhibition & 4th Peace Art Exhibition & Four-Artists group exhibition, Sato Gallery, Tokyo
- 1957 9th Yomiuri Indépendant Exhibition & 42nd Nika Exhibition & 11th Women Artists Association Exhibition (女流画家協会展) (won the Funaoka Prize 船岡賞)
- 1958 43rd Nika Exhibition
- 1960 Japan-America Women Painters, Riverside Art Museum, New York
- 1963 11th Women Artists Association Exhibition
- 2001 Japanese Women Artists before and after WWII, 1930s-1950s, Tochigi Prefectural Museum of Fine Arts
- 2005 Japanese Women Artists in Avant-Garde Movements, 1950-1975, Tochigi Prefectural Museum of Fine Arts
- 2012 TOKYO 1955-1970: A NEW Avant-Garde, Museum of Modern Art, New York
- 2016 Ecce Homo: See the Modern Human Image, The National Museum of Art, Osaka

== Collection ==
- Tochigi Prefectural Museum of Fine Arts
- National Museum of Modern Art, Tokyo (Woman (I), Woman (B), Myth — Birds of Gods, From the Japanese Myth, Black and Brown, Sphinx)
- National Museum of Art, Osaka
- Hatonomori Art
- Bohemian's Gallery
- Nukaga Gallery
