= Key Sato =

Japanese painter

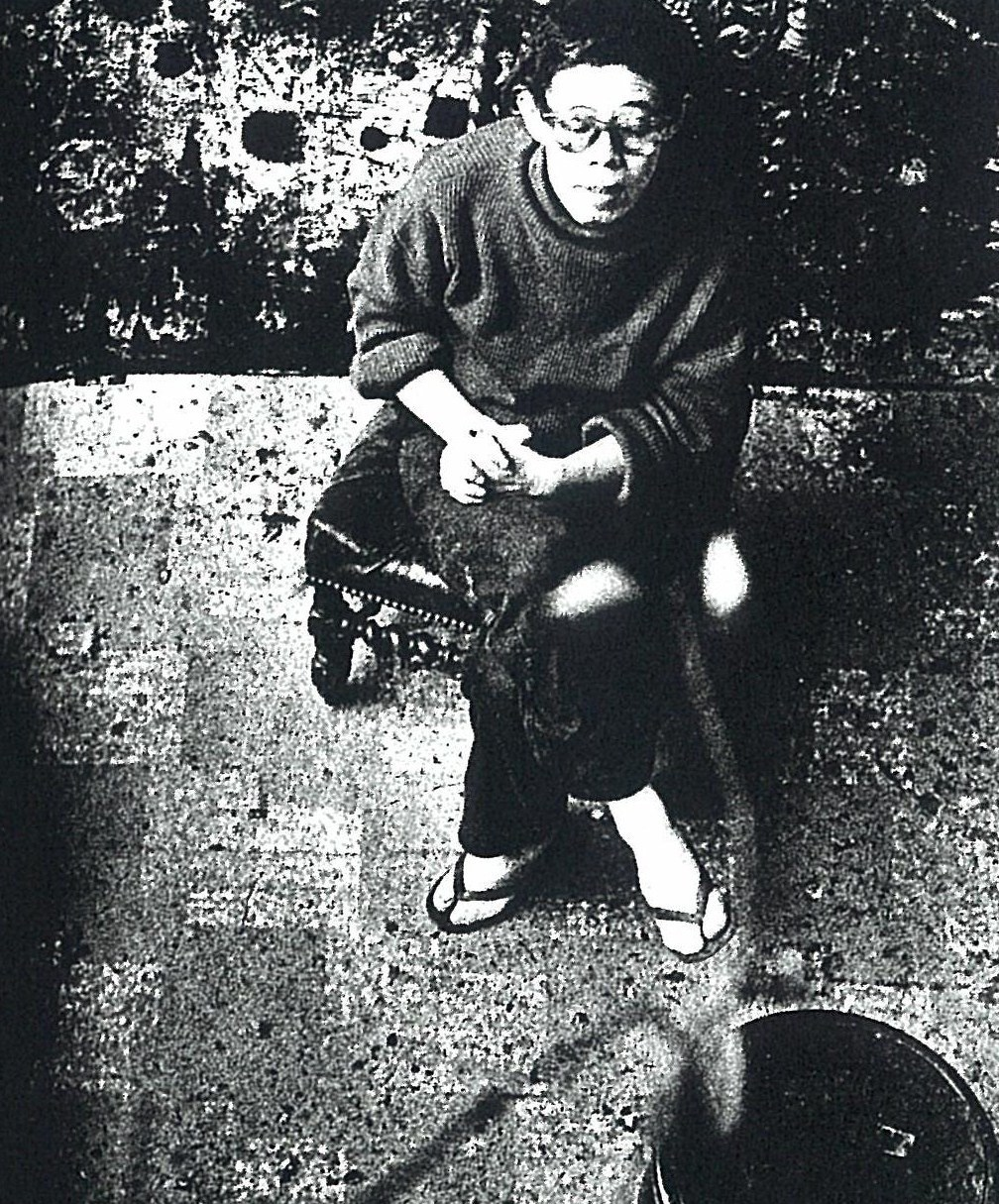
- in Paris 1960s
- Born: 28 October 1906; Oita, Japan
- Died: 8 May 1978 (aged 71); Beppu, Japan
- Occupation: Painter

Key Sato (28 October 1906 – 8 May 1978) was a Japanese painter. His work was part of the painting event in the art competition at the 1936 Summer Olympics.

His first exhibition in Paris took place in 1954 at the Mirador Gallery, and he went on to join the Massol Gallery in 1959. He made his debut at the Salon de Mai in 1955 where he exhibited until 1961, travelling vastly in Europe and the United States.
