= Young Ladies Beside the Seine (Summer) =

Painting by Gustave Courbet

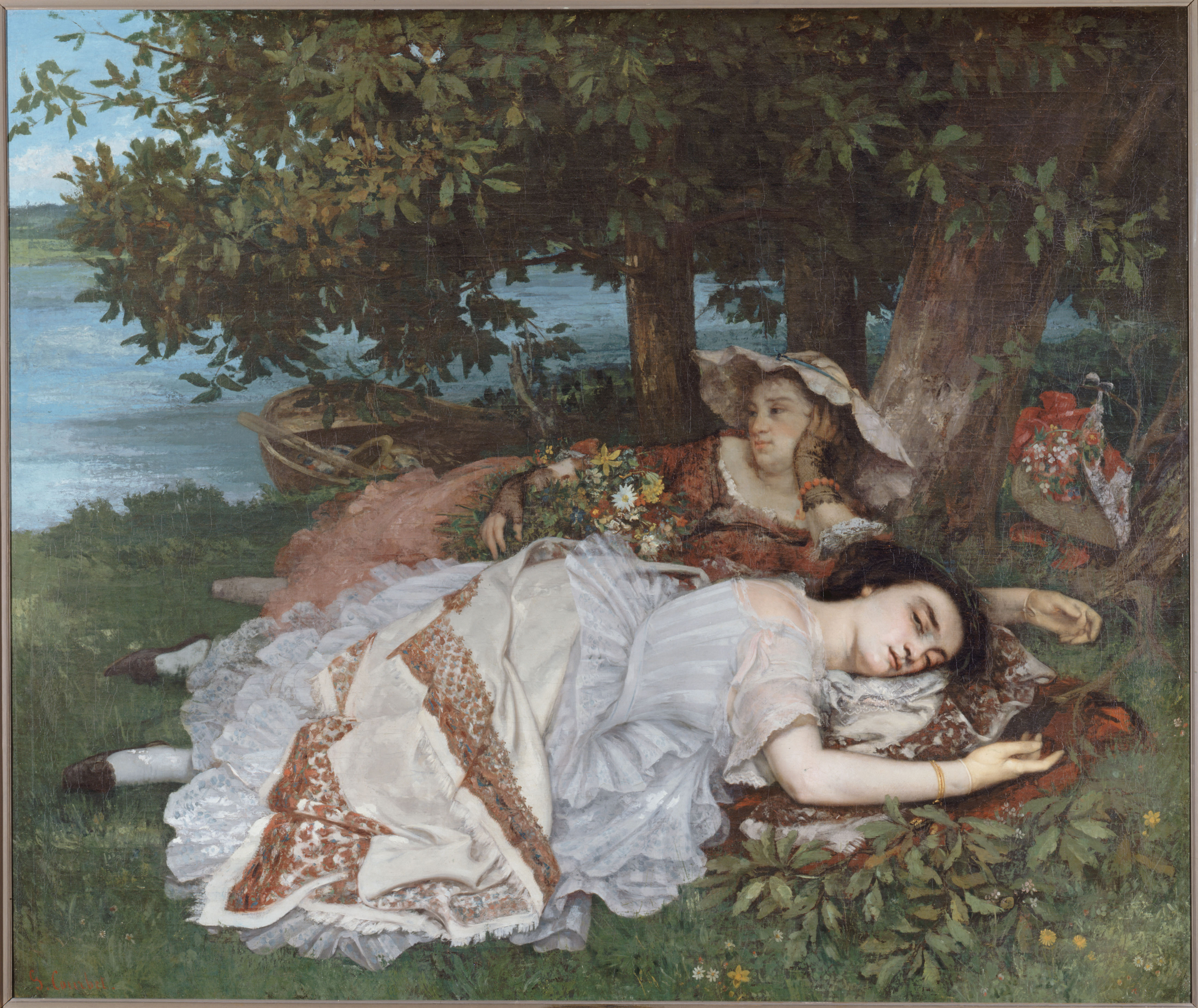
- Artist: Gustave Courbet
- Year: 1856–57
- Type: oil on canvas
- Dimensions: 174 cm × 206 cm (69 in × 81 in)
- Location: Petit Palais, Paris

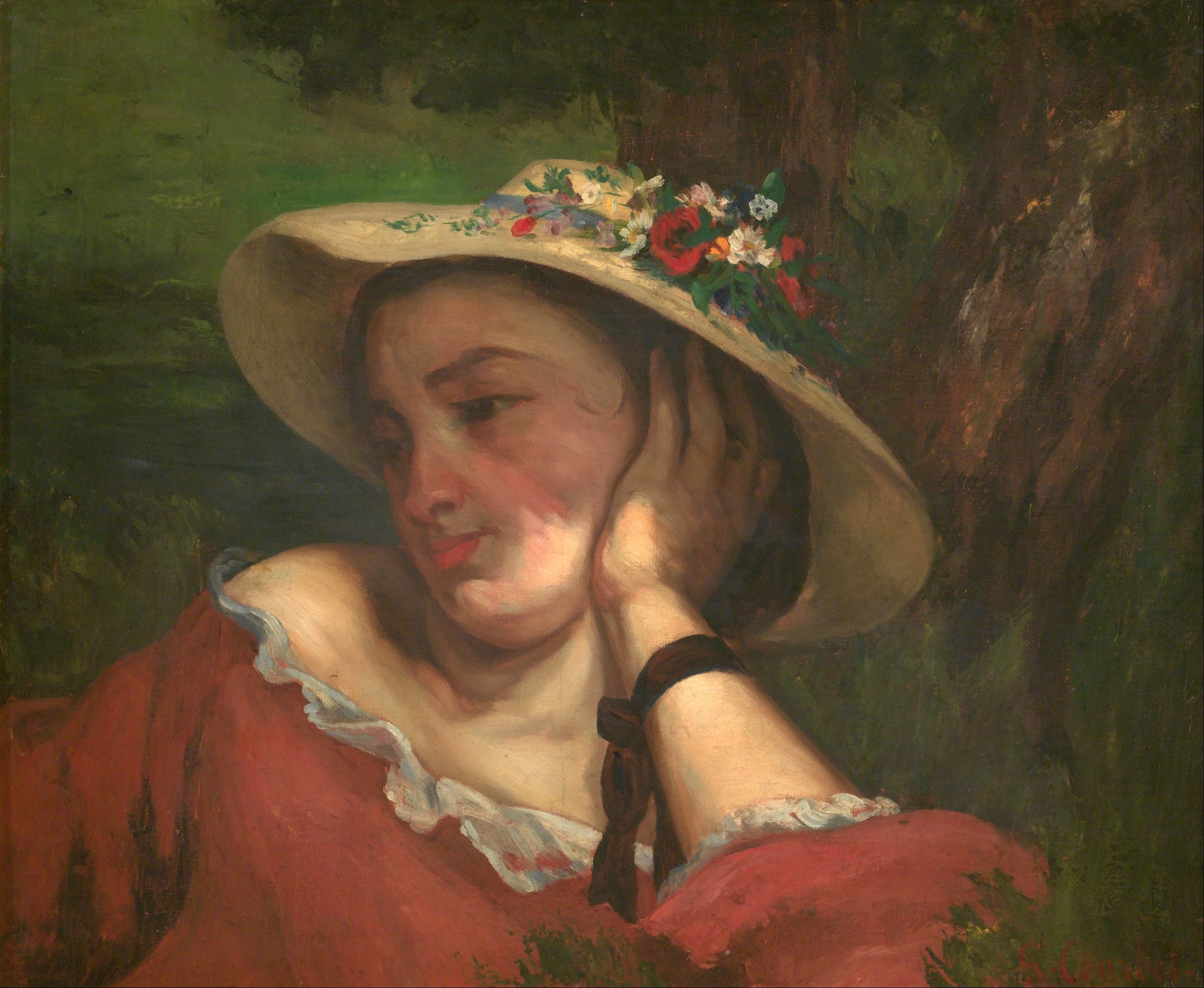
Sketch for the final work, signed, 1856 (National Gallery, Prague)

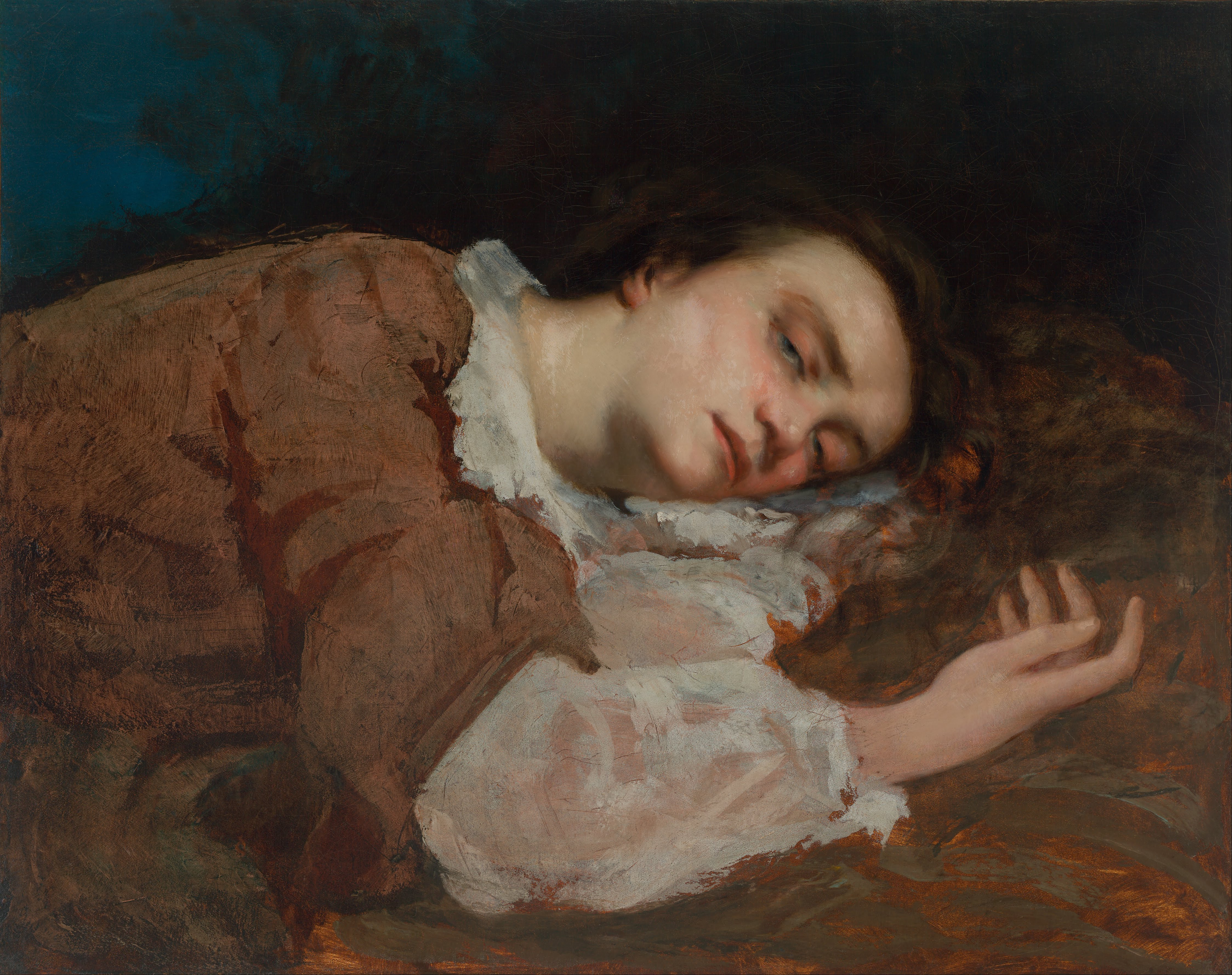
Unsigned sketch, 1856 (National Gallery of Australia, Canberra)

Young Ladies Beside the Seine (Summer) (French - Les Demoiselles des bords de la Seine (été)) is an oil-on-canvas painting by the French Realist Gustave Courbet, created between late 1856 and early 1857. It is held in the Petit Palais, in Paris.

== History and provenance ==
He presented it to the Paris Salon jury, which accepted it and exhibited it on 15 June 1857, with five other paintings of his authorship, two portraits and three landscapes.

It was bought by Courbet's friend and patron Étienne Baudry (1830–1908), then was bequeathed by him to the painter's sister Juliette, who left it to the French state in 1906. It now hangs in the Petit Palais, in Paris.

== Description ==
It is a canvas of large dimensions representing two women lying in the grass beneath trees, at the edge of the river. Occupying the foreground of the painting, the first woman is dressed in a patterned white dress; she is lying on her stomach, her bare head rests on a cloth, and her eyes are half-closed. The second woman wears a red dress and holds a bouquet of flowers. Her head, covered with a hat, leans on her hand, while she looks away, towards the water. On the right, at the bottom of a tree, there is a hat studded with flowers.

The full title says it is summer, and that they are two young and single ladies. The river is the Seine, the other bank of which can be seen in the upper-left corner. We see a boat moored to the shore and filled with objects (hat, fabrics). All three trees depicted are oaks.

== Analysis ==
These two young ladies are city dwellers who have come to cool off one summer day at the water's edge. The realism of the scene, of an affirmed sensuality, imposes itself by the frankness of the faces and the attitudes. The modernity of the subject announces the great pictorial fortune of the banks of the Seine, celebrated by the Impressionists, a generation later. This work, singular for its modern subject and its unusual large format for a genre scene, upset the rules of the art of his time. Courbet, willingly provocative, triggered a critical scandal by exhibiting it at the Salon of 1857.

According to Jules-Antoine Castagnary, it echoes a previous painting by Courbet, Young Ladies of the Village (1852).

There is a smaller sketch version (96.5 by 130 cm), which is held in the National Gallery, in London, possibly by Courbet or one of his disciples. In addition, there are also various small preparatory canvases representing portraits of both women for the final canvas, in museums like the National Gallery, in Prague, and the National Gallery of Australia, in Canberra.
