= Akutagawa (crater) =

Crater on Mercury

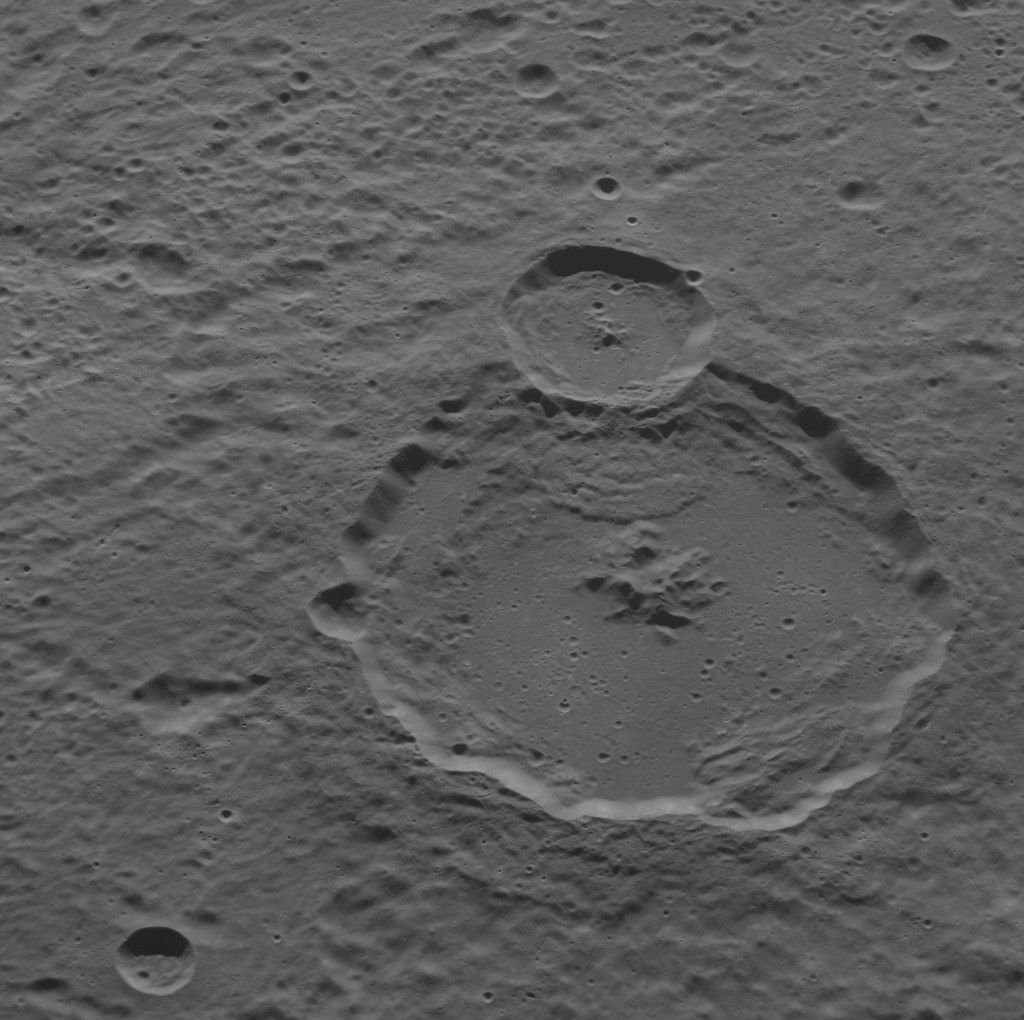
- MESSENGER oblique view
- Feature type: Impact crater
- Location: Shakespeare quadrangle, Mercury
- Coordinates: 48.25°N 141.09°W
- Diameter: 106 km (66 mi)
- Eponym: Ryūnosuke Akutagawa

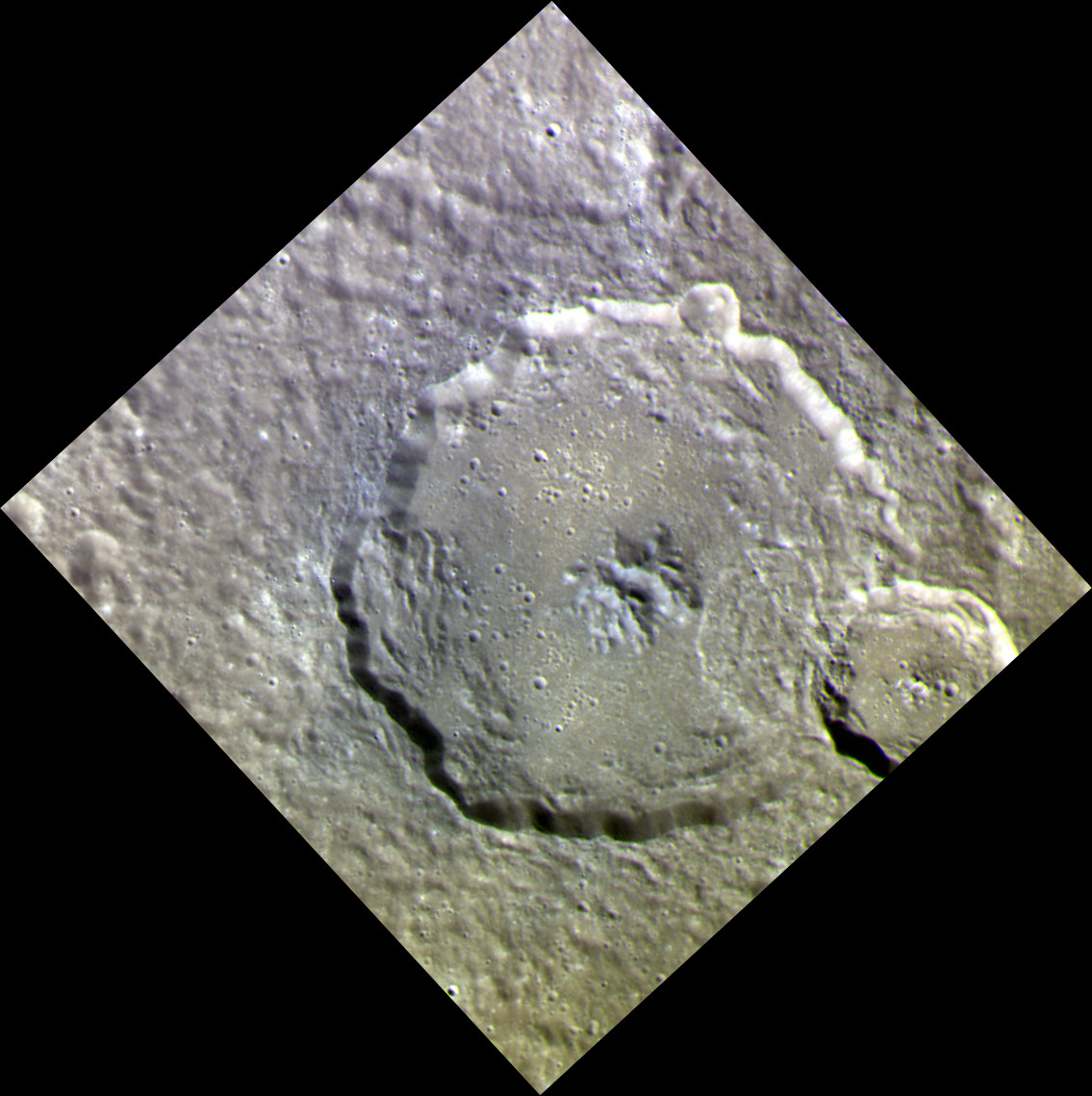
Approximate color image of Akutagawa

Akutagawa is a crater on Mercury. It has a diameter of 106 kilometers. Its name was adopted by the International Astronomical Union (IAU) in on September 25, 2015. Akutagawa is named for the Japanese writer Ryūnosuke Akutagawa.

Much of Akutagawa is surrounded by low-reflectance material (LRM), thought to be caused by the carbon mineral graphite.
