= Kazu Wakita =

Japanese painter

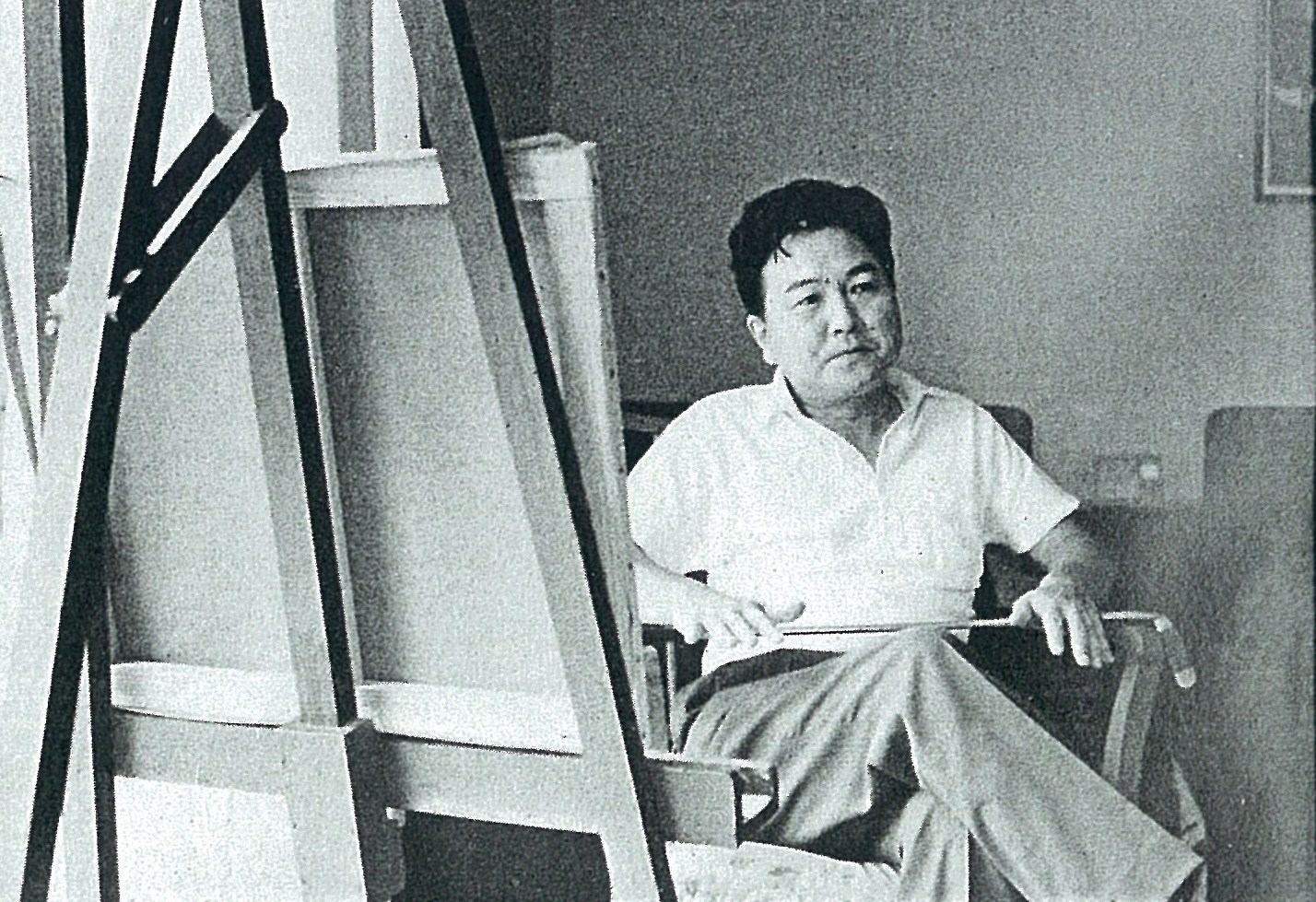
- Kazu Wakita in 1960
- Born: 7 June 1908; Tokyo, Japan
- Died: 27 November 2005 (aged 97); Tokyo, Japan
- Occupation: Painter

Kazu Wakita (Japanese: 脇田和; 7 June 1908 – 27 November 2005) was a Japanese painter. His work was part of the painting event in the art competition at the 1936 Summer Olympics.
