= Takanori Ogisu =

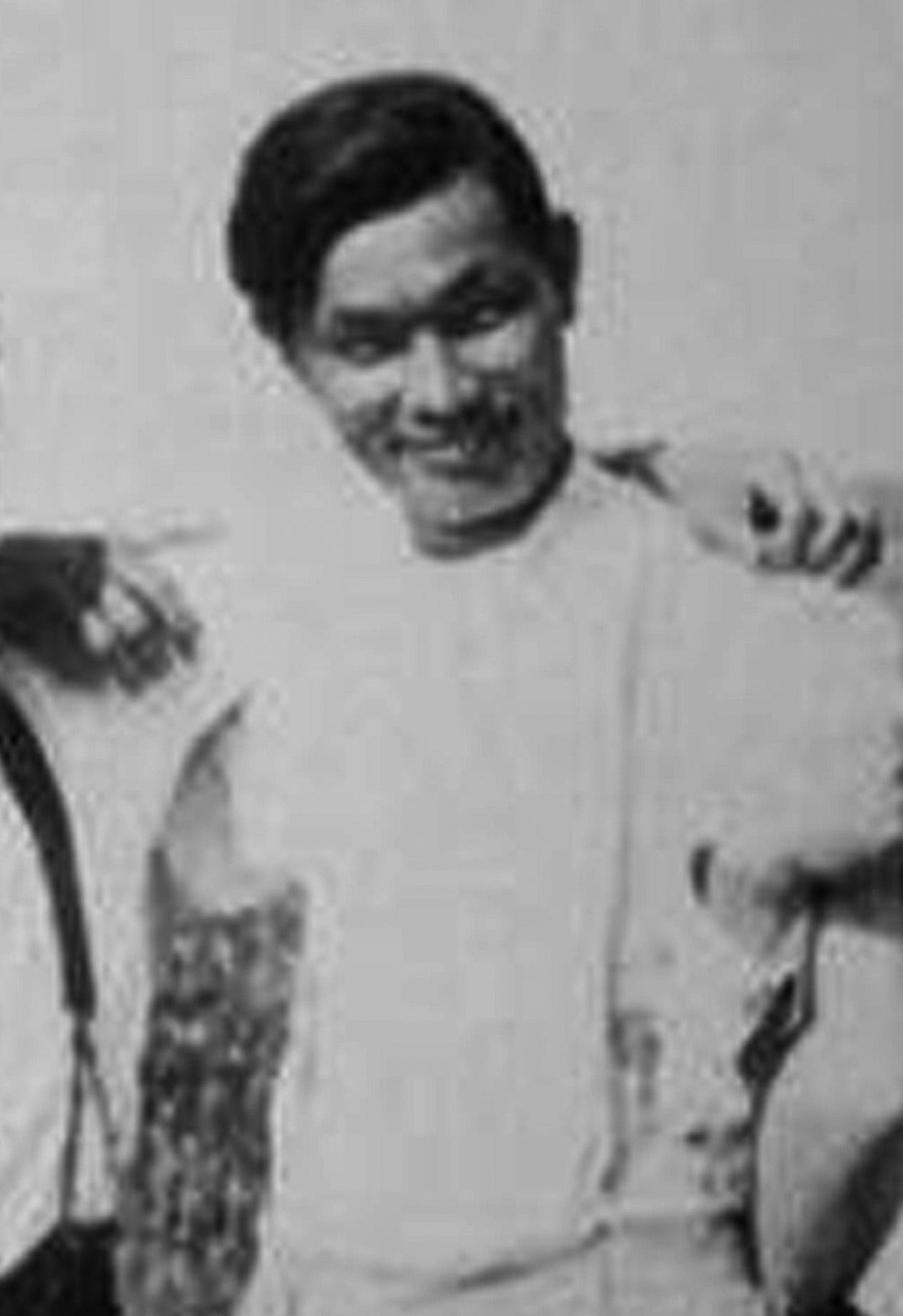
Takanori Ogisu, 1929

Takanori Ogisu (荻須 高徳, Ogisu Takanori; 30 November 1901 – 14 October 1986), styled as Takanori Oguiss, was a Japanese figurative painter who lived and worked most of his life in France. He is known by his cityscape paintings.

== Life and career ==
Born in Inazawa, Takanori Ogisu was the son of a landowner in the Nagoya region. Ogisu went to Tokyo in 1920 to become a painter. He studied at the Kawabata painting school (川端 画 学校, Kawabata Gagakkō) under Fujishima Takeji, then went to the Tokyo School of Fine Arts (precursor of Tōkyō Geijutsu Daigaku), where he graduated in 1929. In the same year the painter Yuzo Saeki, who had come back from France, visited Ogisu together with Takeo Yamaguchi and encouraged them to study in France. Ogisu and Yamaguchi followed the advice and went to Paris. They were part of a group of Japanese painters who went to study in France, such as Foujita, Inokuma, and Sadami Yokote, in 1927.

Ogisu settled in the district of Montparnasse, and frequented the painters of La Ruche, being particularly impressed by the paintings of Maurice Utrillo. In the 1930s, he occupied a studio at the foot of the Butte Montmartre, on rue Ordener, not far from his friends Inokuma and Foujita.

After a return to Japan, on the orders of the Vichy government (when he was appointed as a painter of the Japanese armies during the Second World War, but served only a few weeks on the two and a half years he was there, spending the rest of the time painting in Inazawa), Ogisu established himself definitively in 1948 in France, painting in bright colors the old picturesque districts, the old shops, haberdashery, paper mills, wine and liquor stores, wood, coal, and flower markets. In 1951, he wrote and illustrated Nouvelles de Paris, published by Mainichi. He also traveled to Amsterdam, Ghent, Antwerp and Venice, composing colorful works with unusual framing.

== Death and legacy ==
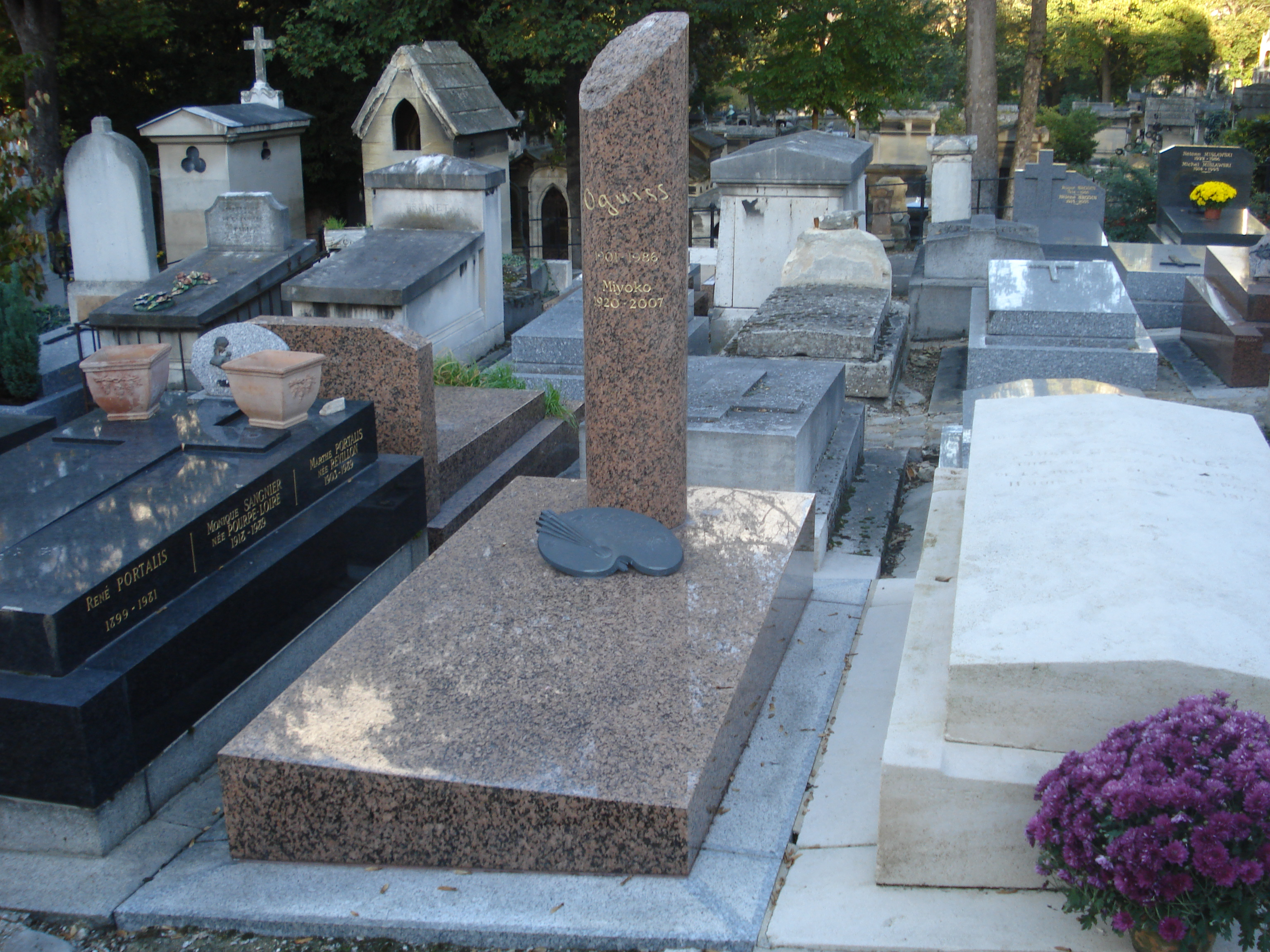
Tomb of Takanori Oguiss at Montmartre Cemetery

His last exhibition during his lifetime took place at the museum of Saint-Denis in 1986. He died the same year and is buried in the Montmartre cemetery. A museum is dedicated to him in the Japanese city of Inazawa where his Montmartre city studio has been reconstituted.
