= Masayoshi Ise =

Japanese painter

- Born: 28 February 1907; Kazuno, Japan
- Died: 18 November 1985 (aged 78); Tokyo, Japan
- Occupation: Painter

Masayoshi Ise (伊勢正義, 28 February 1907 – 18 November 1985) was a Japanese painter. His work was part of the painting event in the art competition at the 1936 Summer Olympics.
