= Ryōhei Koiso =

Japanese artist (1903–1988)

- 小磯良平
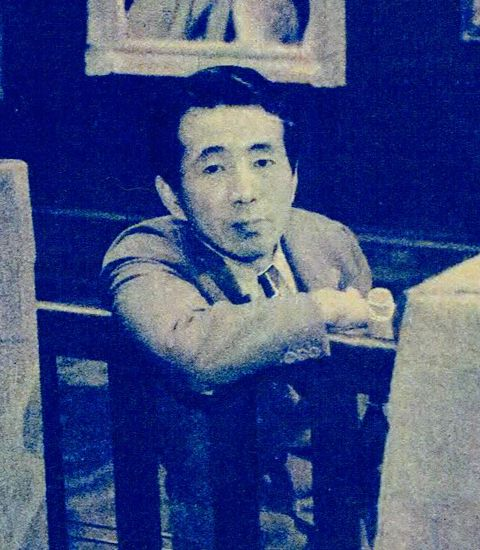
- Born: July 25, 1903; Kobe, Kobe City, Hyogo Prefecture
- Died: 16 December 1988 (aged 85); Higashinada-ku, Kobe
- Education: Tokyo University of the Arts
- Occupation: Painter
- Awards: Asahi Prize (1939); Japanese Academy of Arts Award (ja:日本芸術院賞) (1942); Person of Cultural Merit (1979); Member of Japan Art Academy (1982); Order of Culture (1983); Kobe City Honorary Citizen (1983)

Ryōhei Koiso (小磯 良平, Koiso Ryōhei; Japanese: [koiso ɾʲoːheː]) (July 25, 1903 – December 16, 1988) was a Japanese artist. He graduated from the Tokyo University of the Arts western art department in 1927 and had a successful career from early on. During World War II he was often commissioned paintings depicting Japanese military scenes, such as the signing of the British surrender of Singapore, and Japanese infantrymen making their way through high grass fields in Malaysia. He returned to mainstream painting following the war, and painted until his death. His work was also part of the painting event in the art competition at the 1936 Summer Olympics.

== Gallery ==
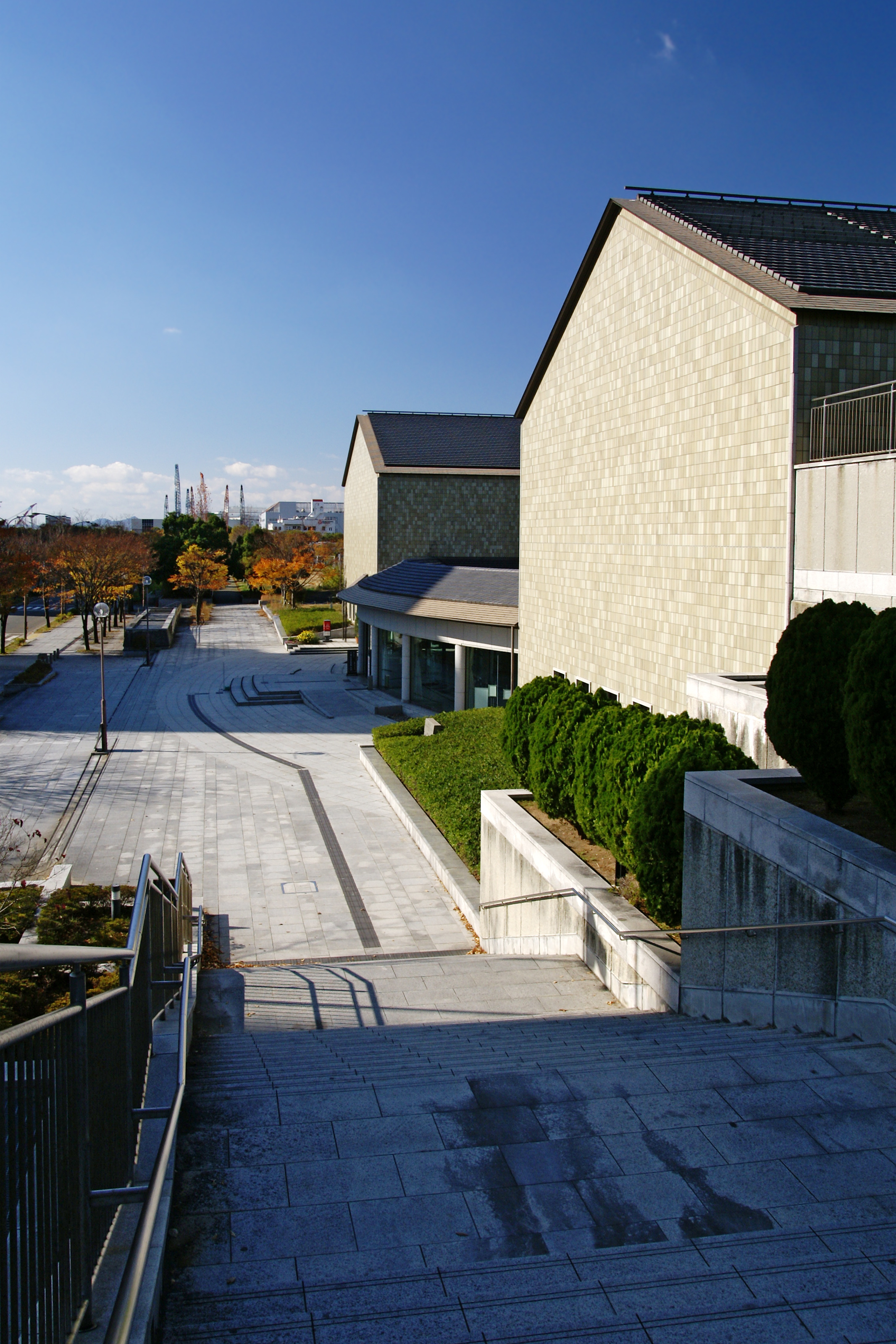
Kobe City Koiso Memorial Museum of Art in Kobe, Japan

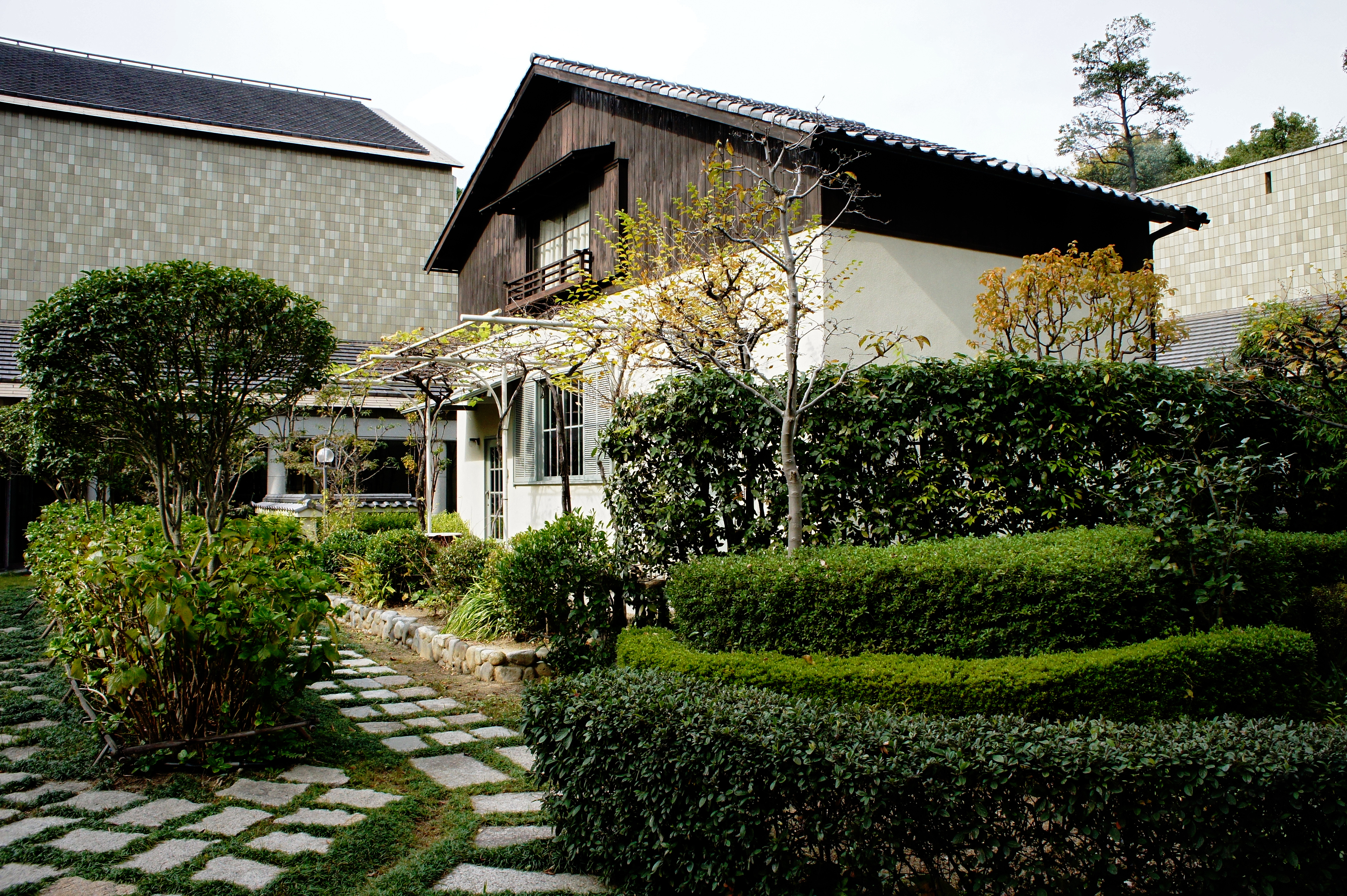
Atelier (1949, Koiso Memorial Museum of Art)

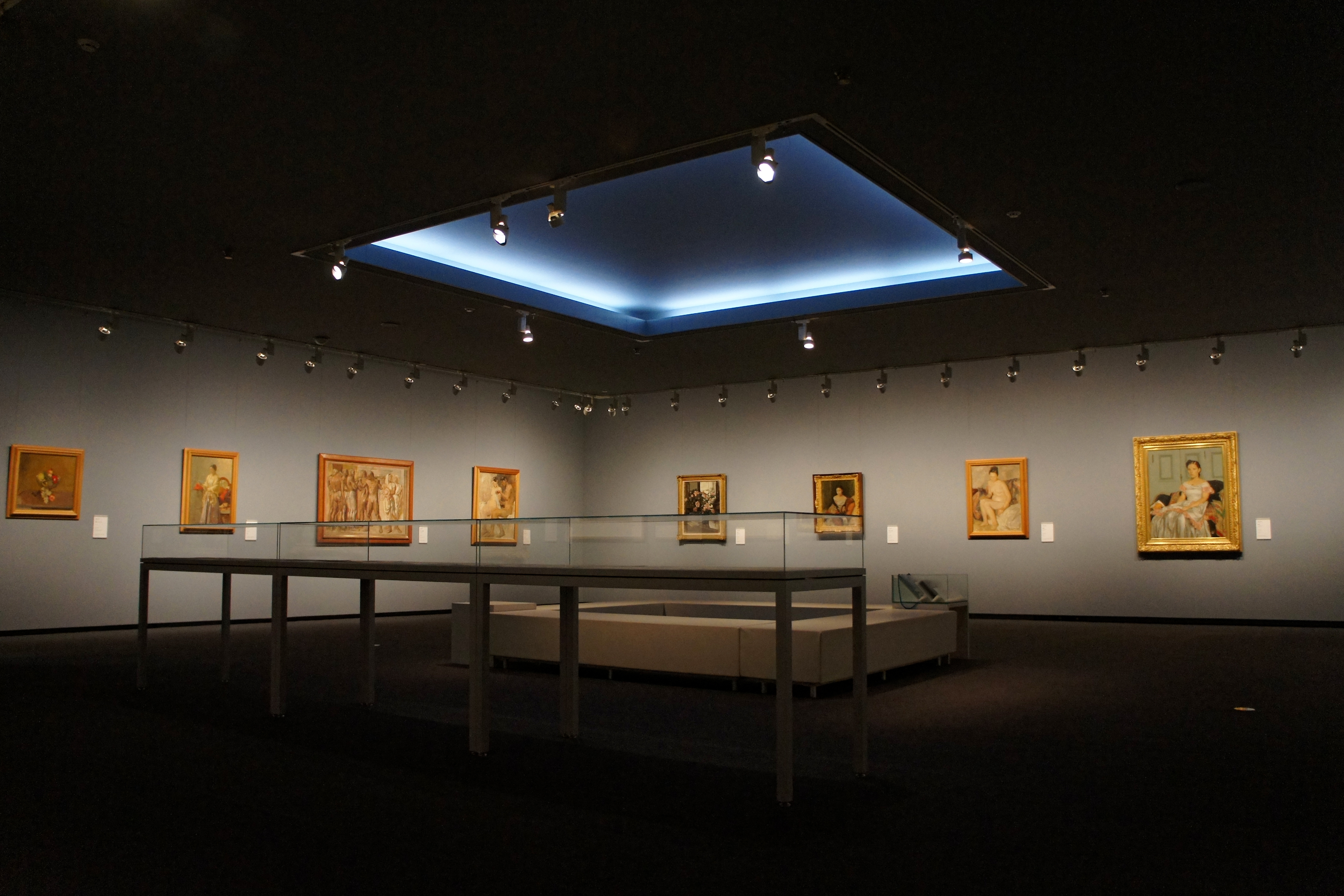
Hyogo Prefectural Museum of Art Ryohei Koiso Memorial Room

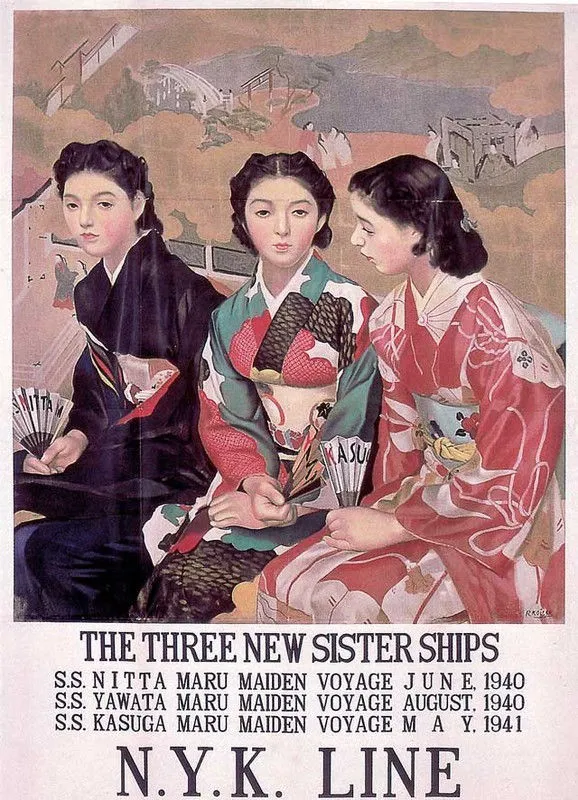
Promotional poster of the NYK Nitta Maru Sisters

== See also ==
- Iku Takenaka
