= Kisho Kurokawa =

Japanese Metabolist architect (1934–2007)

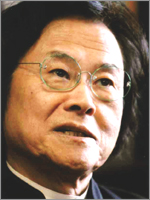
- Born: 8 April 1934; Kanie, Aichi, Empire of Japan
- Died: 12 October 2007 (aged 73); Tokyo, Japan
- Education: Kyoto University; University of Tokyo
- Occupation: Architect
- Buildings: Nakagin Capsule Tower, The National Art Center (Tokyo), Nagoya City Art Museum, Kuala Lumpur International Airport

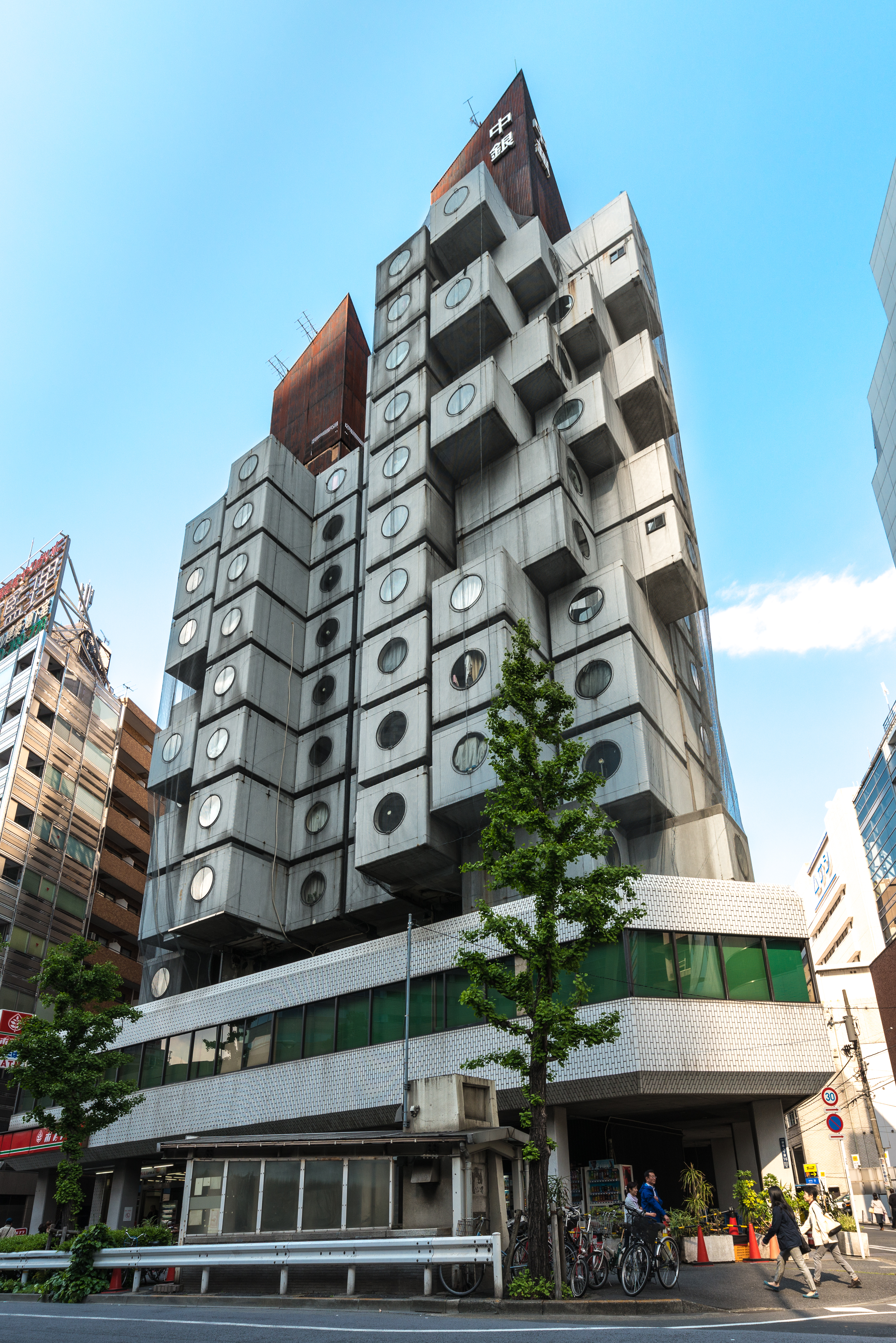
The Nakagin Capsule Tower

Kisho Kurokawa (黒川 紀章, Kurokawa Kishō) (April 8, 1934 – October 12, 2007) was a leading Japanese architect and a founder of the Metabolist Movement.

== Biography ==
Kisho Kurokawa

Born in Kanie, Aichi, Kurokawa studied architecture at Kyoto University, graduating with a bachelor's degree in 1957. He then attended University of Tokyo, where he studied under the supervision of architect Kenzo Tange, a major figure in postwar Japanese architecture and a key influence on the development of the Metabolist Movement. Under Tange's supervision, Kurokawa completed and received a master's degree in 1959 and was exposed to experimental urban design concepts that would later shape his work. Kurokawa then went on to study for a doctorate of philosophy, but subsequently dropped out in 1964. Kisho Kurokawa was conferred an Honorary Doctorate of Architecture by the Chancellor of Universiti Putra Malaysia (UPM), Malaysia in Sept. 7, 2002.

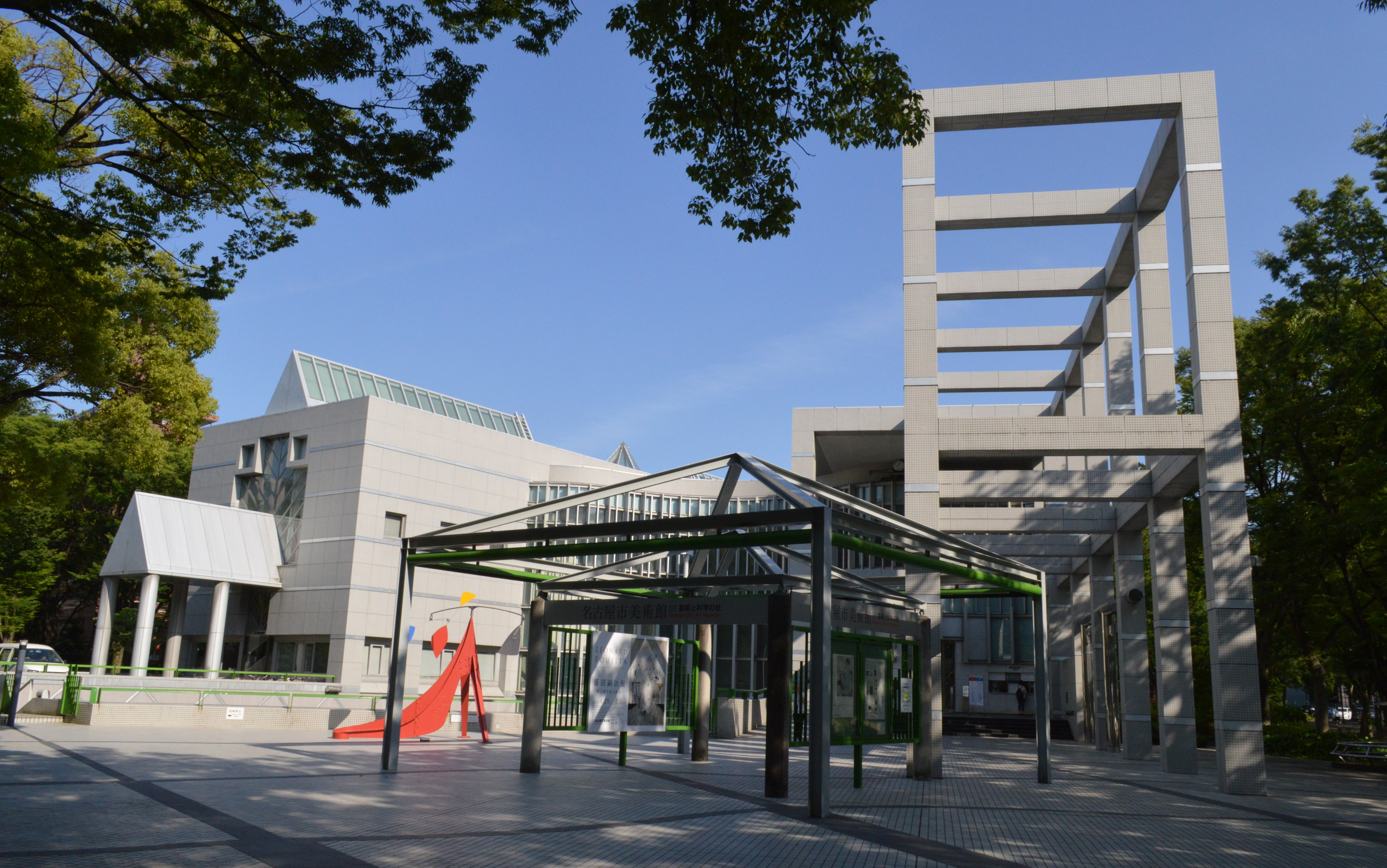
Entrance to the Nagoya City Art Museum

Kurokawa had a daughter and a son from his first marriage to his college classmate. His second marriage was to Ayako Wakao (若尾 文子 Wakao Ayako). Kurokawa's younger brother works in industrial design but has also cooperated with Kurokawa on some architecture projects.

Kurokawa founded Kisho Kurokawa Architect & Associates in 1962. The firm became an important platform for this architectural work, producing a wide range of projects including cultural institutions, museums, airports, and large-scale urban developments across Asia and Europe. Through this practice, Kurokawa used his theoretical ideas about modularity, adaptability, and sustainability to built projects. The enterprise's head office is in Tokyo with branch offices in Osaka, Nagoya, Astana, Kuala Lumpur, Beijing and Los Angeles. The company is registered with the Japanese government as a "First Class Architects Office."

Although he had practiced the concept of sustainable and eco-minded architecture for four decades, Kisho Kurokawa became more adamant about environmental protection in his latter years. In 2007, he ran for governor of Tokyo and then for a seat in the House of Councillors in the 2007 Japanese House of Councillors election. Although not elected, Kisho Kurokawa successfully established the Green Party to help provide environmental protection. Also in 2007, Kurokawa created the structure of the Anaheim University Kisho Kurokawa Green Institute, which helps to develop environmentally-conscious business practices. Kurokawa was a stakeholder and founding Chair of the Executive Advisory Board of the Anaheim, California-based university since 1998 and his wife Ayako Wakao-Kurokawa serves as Honorary Chairman of the institute.

Kurokawa wrote extensively on philosophy and architecture and lectured widely. He wrote that there are two traditions inherent in any culture: the visible and the invisible. His work, he claimed, carried the invisible tradition of Japan. In 1972, he received a grant from the Graham Foundation to deliver a lecture at the Museum of Science and Industry in Chicago.

While Kurokawa's architecture, particularly within Metabolism, does not explicitly follow traditional Japanese forms, some scholars argue that it retains elements of Japanese aesthetics. However, it is difficult to claim that the modern technologies and material he called on was inherited from the Japanese tradition and that the traditional forms of Japanese architecture can be recognized in his contemporary concrete or steel towers. Some architectural critics suggest that Kurokawa's designs evolved from Japanese traditions, incorporating elements of Japanese aesthetics.

His architecture focused on keeping traditional Japanese concepts invisible, especially materiality, impermanence, receptivity and detail. Kurokawa specifically referred to these four factors in his discussions of new wave Japanese Architecture.

He died of heart failure on October 12, 2007; he was 73.

== Metabolism ==
With colleagues, he cofounded the Metabolist Movement in 1960, whose members were known as Metabolists. It was a radical Japanese avant-garde movement pursuing the merging and recycling of architecture styles within an Asian context. The movement was widely recognized, peaking when its members received praise for the Takara Cotillion Beautillion at the Osaka World Expo 1970. The group was dismantled shortly thereafter.

== Key architectural concepts ==
=== Impermanence ===
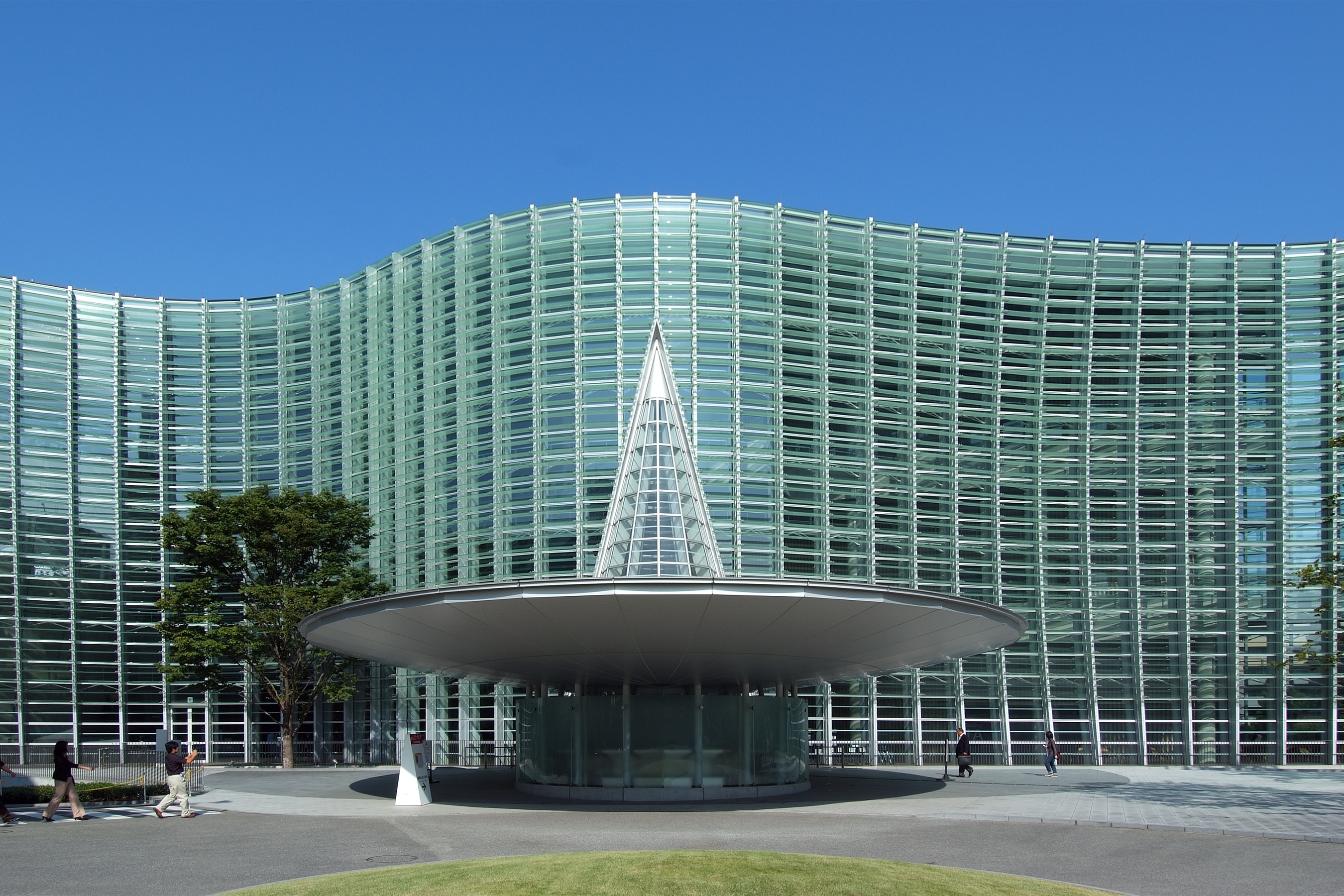
The National Art Center, Tokyo

Kurokawa noted that, with the exception of Kyoto and Kanazawa, most Japanese cities were destroyed during World War II. When Western cities are destroyed, brick and stone remained as proof of their past existence. Kurokawa noted that Japan's cities, primarily built from wood and natural materials, were more susceptible to destruction by fire. He also noted that both Edo (now Tokyo) and Kyoto were almost entirely destroyed during several battles of the Warring States period in the 15th and 16th centuries. The shifting of power caused parts of Japan to be destroyed. On the same note, historically speaking, Japan's cities have almost yearly been hit with natural disasters such as earthquakes, typhoons, floods and volcanic eruptions. This continuous destruction of buildings and cities has given the Japanese population, in Kurokawa's words, “an uncertainty about existence, a lack of faith in the visible, a suspicion of the eternal.”

In addition, the four seasons are very clearly marked in Japan, and the changes through the year are dramatic. Time, then, in Japanese culture is a precious entity that forces every candle, every being, every entity to fade at one point in time. The idea that buildings and cities should seem as natural as possible and that they should be in harmony with the rest of nature, since it is only temporarily there, helped create the tradition of making buildings and cities of “temporary” structure.

This idea of impermanence was reflected in Kurokawa's work during the Metabolism Movement. Buildings were built to be removable, interchangeable and adaptable. The concept of impermanence influenced his work toward open systems, both in time and space.

=== Materiality ===
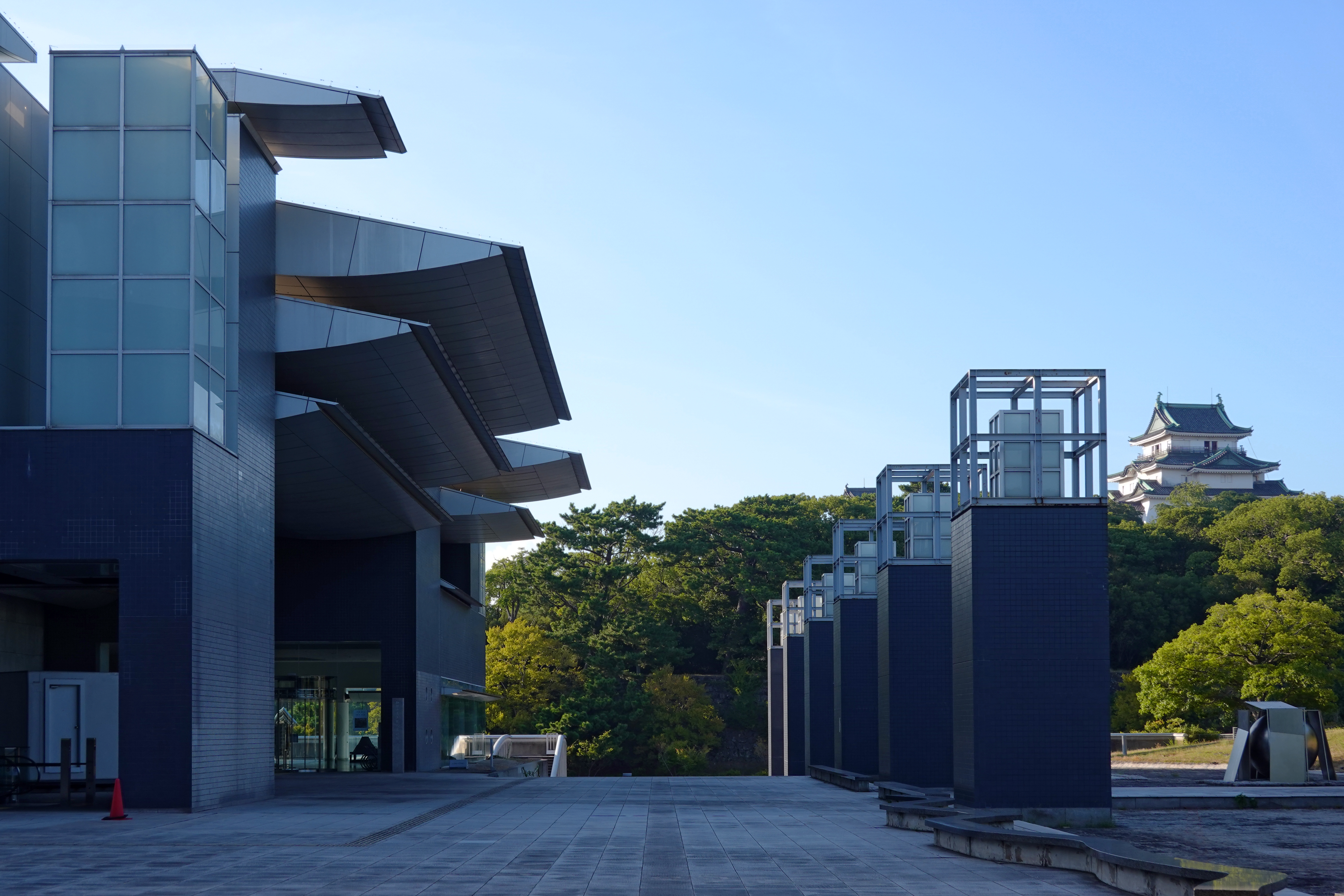
The Museum of Modern Art, Wakayama

Kurokawa explains that the Japanese tried to exploit the natural textures and colors of materials used in a building. The traditional tea room was intentionally built of only natural materials such as earth and sand, paper, the stems and leaves of plants, and small trees. Trees from a person's own backyard were preferred for the necessary timbers. All artificial colors were avoided, and the natural colors and texture of materials were shown to their best advantage. This honesty in materials stemmed from the idea that nature is already beautiful in itself. The Japanese feel that food tastes better, wood looks better, materials are better when natural. There is a belief that maximum enjoyment comes from the natural state.

Kurokawa's designs often highlighted the natural properties of materials, a characteristic observed in his treatment of iron, aluminum, and concrete. The tradition of honesty of materiality is present in Kurokawa's capsule building. In it, he showed technology with “no artificial colors." The capsule, escalator unit, elevator unit and pipe and ductwork were all exterior and exposed. Kurokawa opened structures and made no attempt to hide the connective elements, believing that beauty was inherent in each of the individual parts. This approach emphasized the exposure of materials, which some critics regard as an authentic representation of materiality in design.

=== Receptivity ===
The notion of receptivity is a crucial Japanese idea—possibly a “tradition." Kurokawa stated that Japan is a small country. For more than a thousand years, the Japanese had an awareness of neighboring China and Korea and, in the modern age, Portugal, Great Britain and America, to name a few. The only way for a small country like Japan to avoid being attacked by these empires was to make continuous attempts to absorb foreign cultures for study and, while establishing friendly relations with the larger nations, preserve its own identity. This receptivity is the aspect that allowed Japan to grow from a farming island into an imperial nation, first using Chinese political systems and Chinese advancement, then Western techniques and knowledge. Japan experienced significant industrial and political changes, culminating in its involvement in World War II. Following the war, Japan incorporated elements of American culture and technology into its post-war rebuilding efforts.

Kurokawa's architecture reflects elements of receptivity, and later works sought to establish a distinct architectural identity. At first, Kurokawa's work followed the Modern Movement that was introduced in Japan by Tange, Isozaki and their peers. Tange showed the world that Japan could build modern buildings. His peers followed and continued the style. Then at one point in the 1960s, Kurokawa and a small group of architects began a new wave of contemporary Japanese architecture, believing that previous solutions and imitations were not satisfactory for the new era: life was not present in Modernism. They labeled their approach “metabolism." Kurokawa's work became receptive “to his own philosophy, the Principle of Life." (He saw architecture and cities as a dynamic process where parts needed to be ready for change. He mostly used steel in open frames and units that were prefabricated and interchangeable.)

=== Detail ===
Kurokawa explained that the attention paid to detail in Japanese work derived essentially from the typical attempt to express individuality and expertise. In Japan the execution of details was a process of working not from the whole to the parts but from the parts to the whole. Every wood connection in a house was carefully crafted from the inside out. Japan is a country that moved from a non-industrial country to a fully industrial nation in less than 50 years, during the Meiji revolution. This sharp jump from producing goods by craftsmen to industrially realized production was so rapid that the deep-rooted tradition of fine craftsmanship as a statement of the creator did not disappear. As a result, the Japanese maker continues to be instilled with a fastidious preoccupation for fine details, which can be seen in contemporary architecture, art and industry. Some scholars argue that attention to detail is a significant aspect of traditional Japanese craftsmanship and design aesthetics.

Similarly, Kurokawa's architecture features carefully detailed connections and finishes. He confessed: “This attention to detail is also an important key to understand my own architecture. The belief in the importance of details also suggests the new hierarchy.” Kurokawa believed that, while Western architecture and cities have been organized with a hierarchy from the infrastructure to the parts and details, his new approach to contemporary Japanese architecture focused on the autonomy of parts.

=== Sustainability ===
In 1958, Kisho Kurokawa predicted a “Transition from the Age of the Machine to the Age of Life,” and has continually utilized such key words of life principles as metabolism (metabolize and recycle), ecology, sustainability, symbiosis, intermediate areas (ambiguity) and Hanasuki (Splendor of Wabi) in order to call for new styles to be implemented by society. For four decades, Kisho Kurokawa created eco-friendly and sustainable architectural projects. In 2003 he was awarded the Dedalo-Minosse International Prize (Grand Prix) for his creation of the Kuala Lumpur International Airport in Malaysia and KLIA is the first and only airport in the world to receive the United Nations' Green Globe 21 certification for the airport's commitment to environmental responsibility each year since 2004.

=== Anaheim University Kisho Kurokawa Green Institute ===
The Anaheim University Kisho Kurokawa Green Institute was conceived of by Kisho Kurokawa and established in Kisho Kurokawa's honor in 2008. The institute offers online Certificate, Diploma, Master of Business Administration (MBA) and Doctor of Business Administration (DBA) degree programs in Sustainable Management.

== Projects ==
Kurokawa's projects represent a variety of different building types, including residential architecture, cultural institutions, museums, and large scale infrastructure projects. Many of his works inherit his interest in modular design and technological integration.

The Nakagin Capsule Tower (1972) remains one of the most well-known examples of Metabolist architecture, demonstrating the use of prefabricated, replaceable units.

(His following list of projects organized by the year of completion)

=== 1970s ===
- Takara Beautilion, Theme Pavilion, and Toshiba IHI Pavilion, for Expo '70 (Osaka, 1970)
- Nakagin Capsule Tower (Ginza, Tokyo, 1970–1972, demolished 2022)
- Capsule House K, Karuizawa, Japan (1974)
- Sony Tower (Osaka, 1972–1976)
- Tateshina Planetarium (Hiroshima, 1976)
- Headquarters of the Japanese Red Cross Society (Tokyo, 1975–1977)
- National Museum of Ethnology (Suita, 1973–1977)
- Vitosha New Otani (Sofia, Bulgaria, 1974–1979)

=== 1980s ===
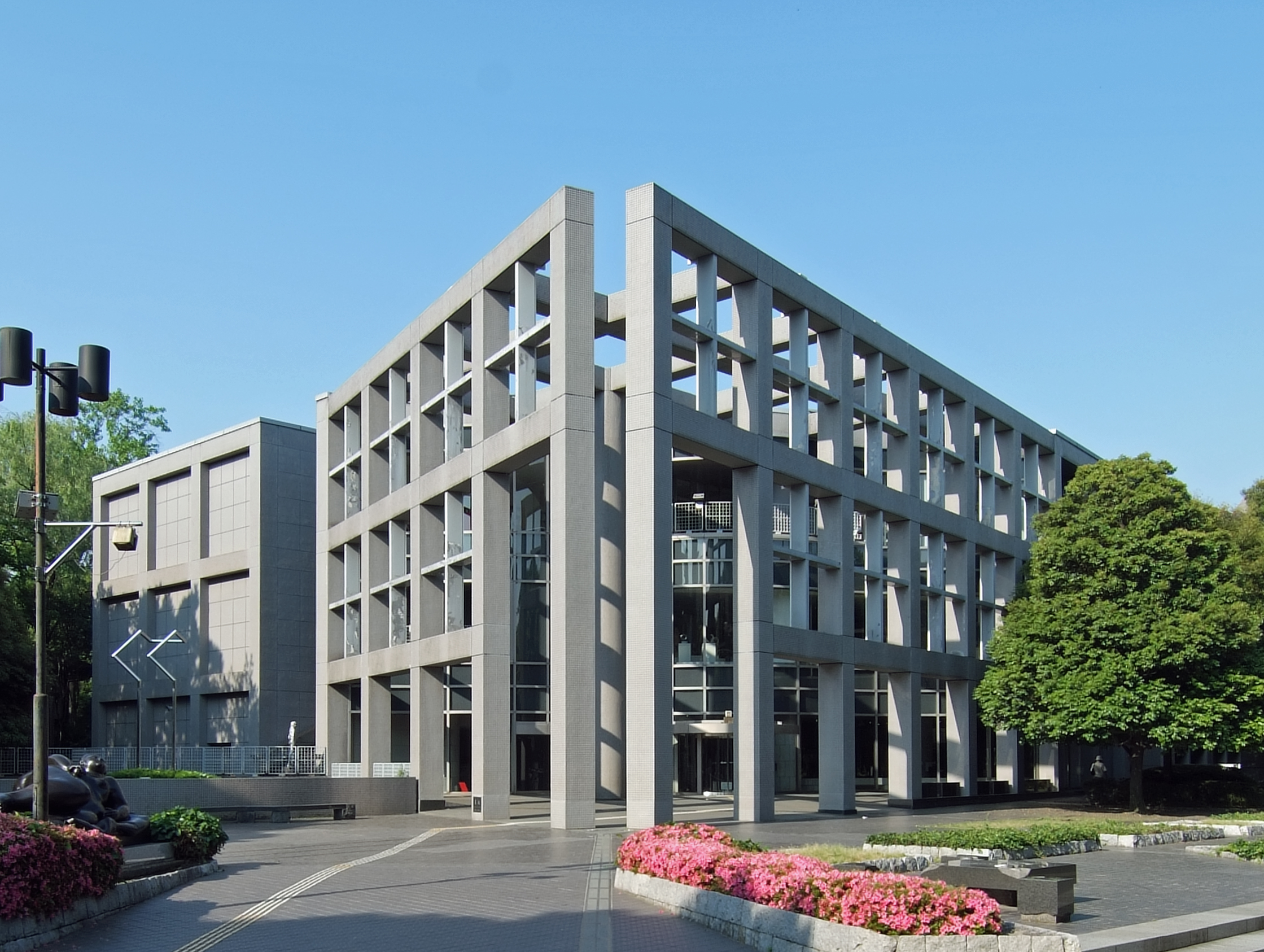
Museum of Modern Art, Saitama

- Museum of Modern Art, Saitama (Saitama, 1978–1982)
- National Bunraku Theater (Osaka, 1979–1983)
- Wacoal Kojimachi Building (Tokyo, 1982–1984)
- Chokaso (Tokyo, 1985–1987)
- Nagoya City Art Museum (Nagoya, 1983–1987)
- Japanese-German Center of Berlin (Berlin, 1985–1988)
- Central Plaza 1 (Brisbane, 1988)
- Osaka Prefectural Government Offices (Osaka, 1988)
- Hiroshima City Museum of Contemporary Art (Hiroshima, 1988–1989)

=== 1990s ===
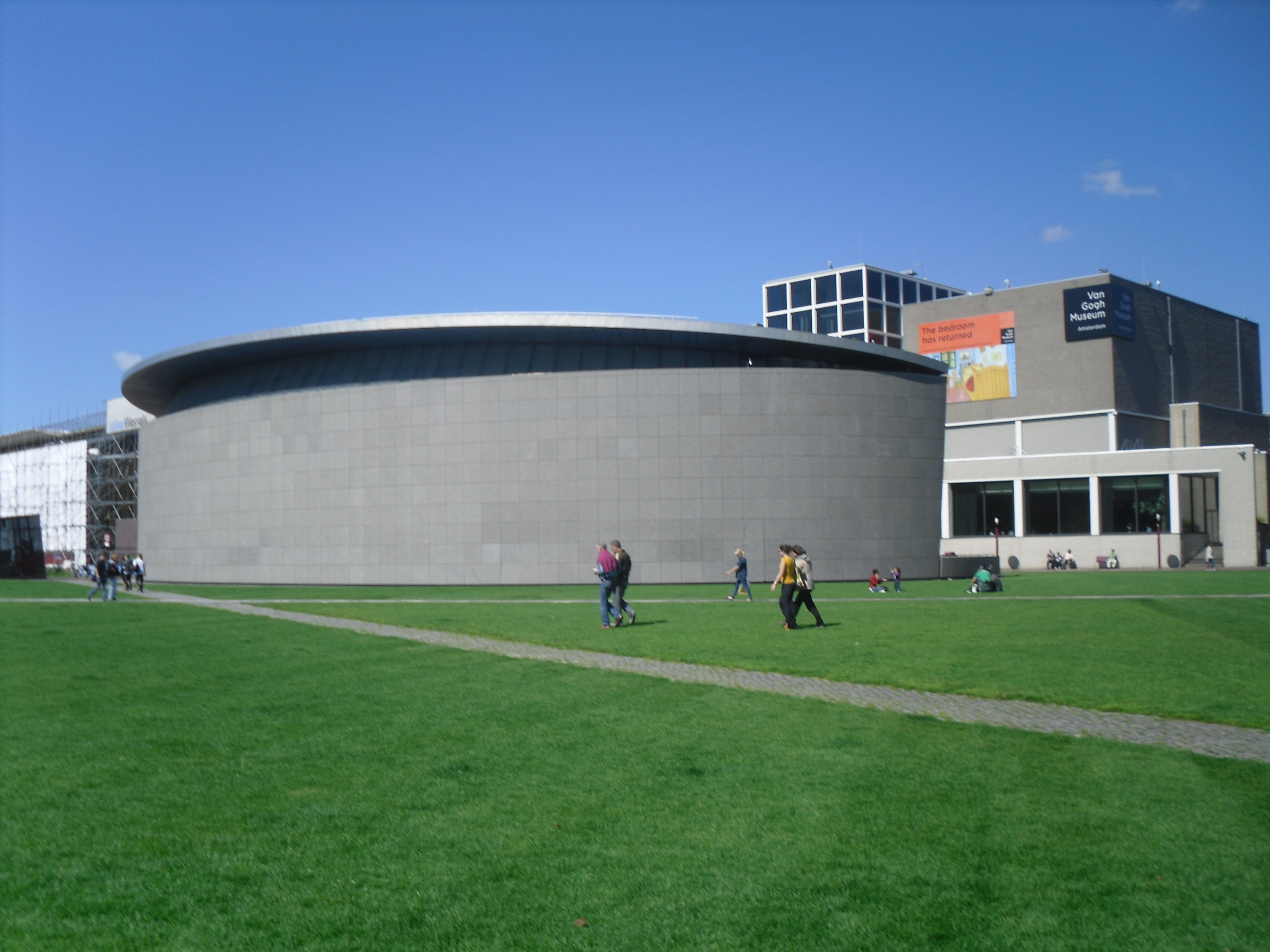

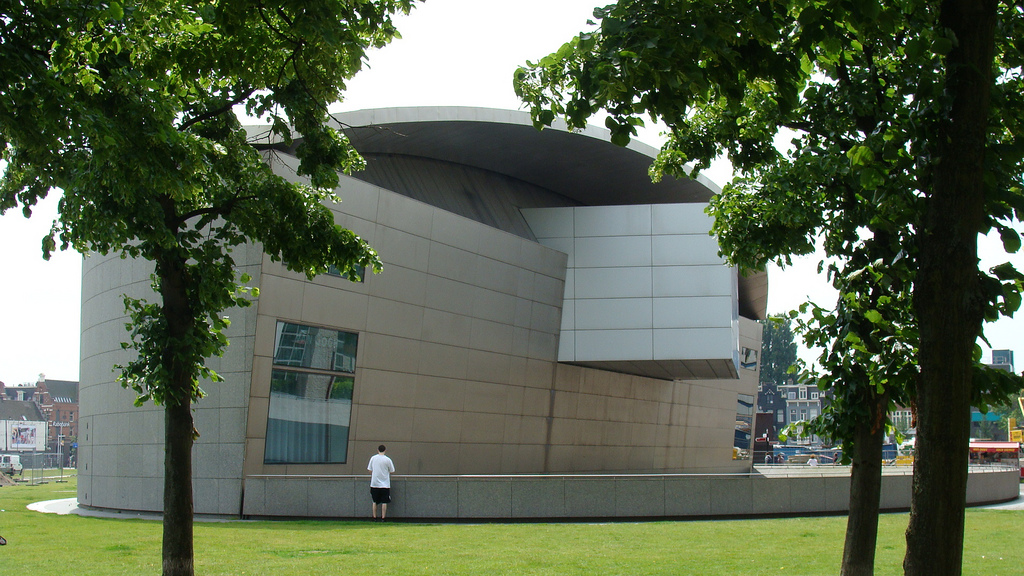
New Wing of the Van Gogh Museum in Amsterdam, Netherlands

- Chinese-Japanese Youth Center (Beijing, 1987–1990)
- Okinawa Prefecture Government Building (Naha, 1988–1990)
- The Sporting Club at Illinois Center (Chicago, 1987–1990)
- Melbourne Central (Melbourne, Australia, 1986–1991)
- Miki House New Office Building (Osaka, 1985–1991)
- Nara City Museum of Photography (Nara, 1989–1991)
- Louvain-La-Neuve Museum (Belgium, 1990–1992)
- Pacific Tower (Paris, France, 1988–1992)
- Lane Crawford Place (Singapore, 1990–1993)
- Senkantei (Hyōgo, 1992–1993)
- Ehime Museum of Science (Ehime, 1991–1994)
- Ishibashi Junior High School (Tochigi, 1992–1994)
- The Museum of Modern Art, Wakayama/Wakayama Prefectural Museum (Wakayama, 1990–1994)
- Hotel Kyocera (Kagoshima, 1991–1995)
- Kibi-cho City Hall/Kibi Dome (Wakayama, 1993–1995)
- Republic Plaza (Singapore, 1986–1995)
- Fukui City Museum of Art (Fukui, 1993–1996)
- Softopia Japan (Gifu, 1990–1996)
- Fujinomiya Golf Club (Fujinomiya, Shizuoka, 1994–1997)
- Kashima-machi City Hall (Kumamoto, 1995–1997)
- Shiga Kogen Roman Art Museum (Yamanouchi, 1994–1997)
- Kuala Lumpur International Airport (Sepang, Malaysia, 1992–1998)
- New Wing of the Van Gogh Museum (Amsterdam, Netherlands, 1990–1998)
- Amber Hall (Kuji, 1996–1999)
- O Residence (Tokyo, 1997–1999)

=== 2000s ===
T2 - Domestic Terminal of Astana International Airport in Astana, Kazakhstan

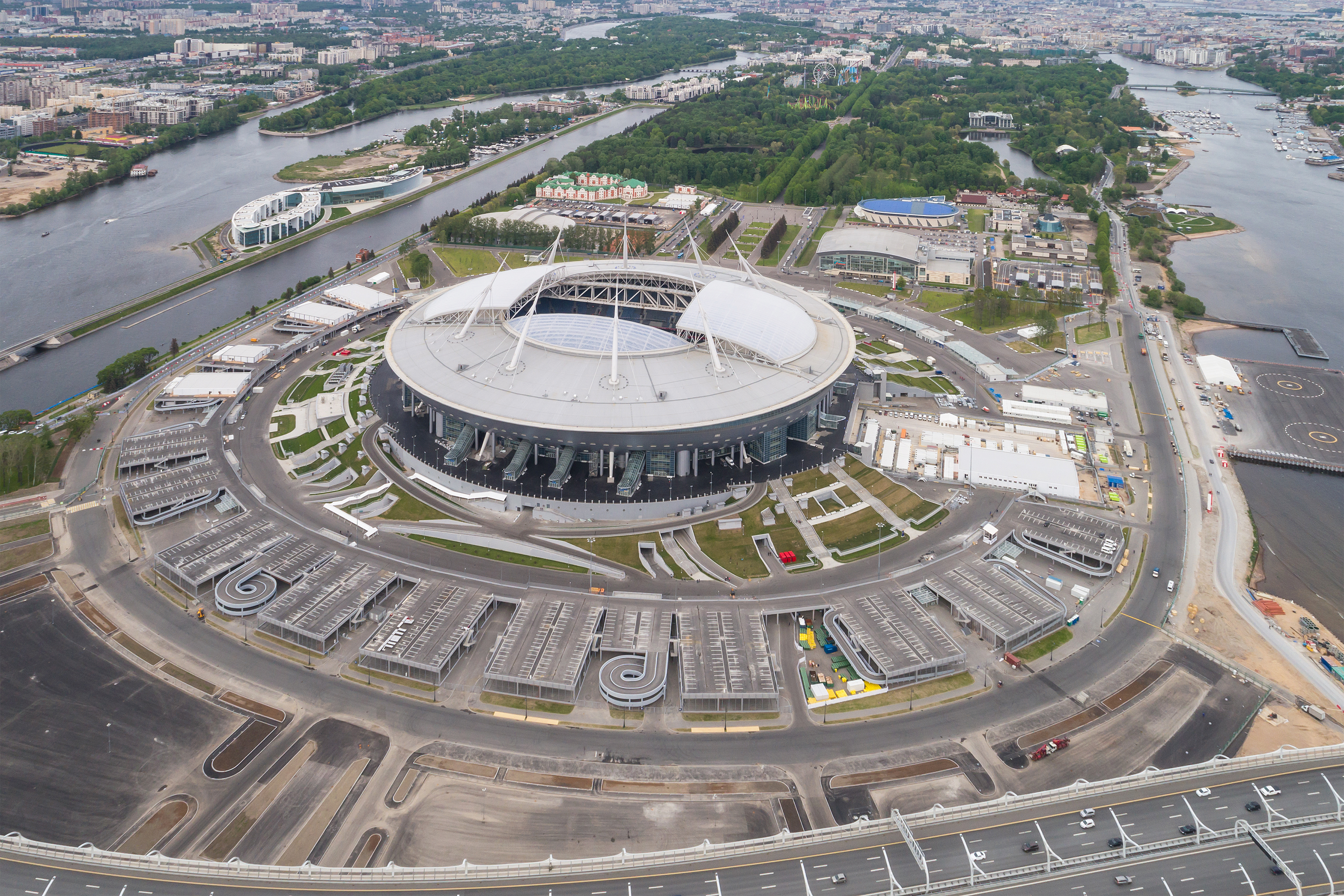
Krestovsky Stadium in St. Petersburg

- Fukui Prefectural Dinosaur Museum (Katsuyama, 1996–2000)
- Osaka International Convention Center (Osaka, 1994–2000)
- Oita Stadium (Ōita, 1996–2001, used for the Football World Cup 2002)
- KL Sentral (Kuala Lumpur, 1994-2001)
- Toyota Stadium (Toyota City, 1997–2001)
- Astana International Airport (T2 - Domestic Terminal), (Astana, Kazakhstan, 2000–2003)
- The National Art Center, Tokyo, Roppongi, Tokyo, 2000–2005)
- Campus of Kyushu University (Fukuoka, 2003–2005)
- Singapore Flyer (Singapore, 2005–2008)
- Fusionopolis Phase 1 (Singapore, 2006)
- Zhengzhou International Convention and Exhibition Centre (Zhengzhou, China, 2002–2005)
- Design and Master Plan of Kazakhstan's New Capital (Astana, delayed due to budget problems)
- Krestovsky Stadium (St. Petersburg, 2006–2017)
- Trade Center (Yekaterinburg, 2007)
- Maggie's, cancer care centre at Singleton Hospital, Swansea

== Awards ==
- Gold Medal, Académie d'Architecture, France (1986)
- Richard Neutra Award, California State Polytechnic University, Pomona (1988)
- 48th Art Academy Award, highest award for artists and architects in Japan (1992)
- Renaming The Art Institute of Chicago to the Kisho Kurokawa Gallery of Architecture (1994)
- Pacific Rim Award, American Institute of Architects, Los Angeles chapter (first awarded, 1997)
- Doctorate Honoris Causa in Humanities, Anaheim University (1998)
- Honorary Fellow, Royal Institute of British Architects, United Kingdom
- Honorary Member, Union of Architects, Bulgaria
- Honorary Doctorate of Architecture by Universiti Putra Malaysia (UPM), Malaysia (2002)
- Dedalo-Minosse International Prize (Grand Prix) for Kuala Lumpur International Airport, Malaysia (2003–2004)
- Certification for a sustainable airport, Green Globe 21, United Nations, for Kuala Lumpur International Airport (2003)
- Walpole Medal of Excellence, United Kingdom (2005)
- Shungdu Friendship Award, China (2005)
- International Architecture Award, The Chicago Athenaeum Museum (2006)

== Notes and references ==
- Images Publishing Group (2000). Architects of the new millennium. Images Publishing. p. 130. ISBN 1-86470-079-3.
- Digitalarti Mag (2009). Digitalarti Mag #0 (PDF). Digitalarti. p. 16. Archived from the original (PDF) on 2011-07-10.
