= Gengo Matsui =

Japanese structural engineer (1920–1996)

- Born: 1920
- Died: 1996
- Education: Waseda University

Gengo Matsui ( 松井源吾, Matsui Gengo, 1920-1996) was a prominent Japanese structural engineer and professor at Waseda University. Throughout his career, he collaborated with several renowned Japanese architects including Kiyonori Kikutake (1928–2011), Kisho Kurokawa (1934–2007), Toyo Ito (born 1941), and Shigeru Ban (born 1957).

Gengo Matsui was active both in academia and in practice through his research lab at Waseda University and through his structural design office O.R.S., namely. He is best known for the structural design of several iconic buildings of Japanese metabolism like the Nakagin Capsule Tower (1972), the Osaka Expo Tower (1970), and the Miyakonojo Civic Center (1966). The ability to work at different scales and using different materials allowed Matsui creating a dense network of interdisciplinary collaborations and a wide range of different projects. In the early 1960s, his experiments with reinforced concrete also in collaboration with the architect Kikutake led to the patenting of the void slab system in Japan, a novel cast-in-situ slab system still largely used today in Japan. Towards the end of his career, Matsui engaged with Shigeru Ban's paper architecture series, developing design solutions in such a way to activate cardboard elements as actual load-bearing elements. Matsui also engaged in research related to wood joinery and modular steel structures, such as Toyo Ito's Silver Hut or Kikutake's Osaka Expo Tower.

Among architects and collaborators, Matsui was known for consistently using photoelasticity to understand and explain the behavior of structures. He used photoelastic experiments both as a visual tool to investigate force flows within structural members as well as a tool to communicate structural design ideas to architects.

After Matsui retired from Waseda University, the Matsui Gengo Prize for structural design was established. A total of 15 honorable contributions to the field of structural design were awarded with the Matsui Gengo Prize between 1991 and 2005. Among the winners were the Irish structural engineer Peter Rice for his work on the Kansai International Airport (awarded in 1995) and the British Sri Lankan engineer Cecil Balmond for his work on the Ito-Balmond Serpentine Pavilion (awarded in 2003).

== List of works ==
- Administrative building of Izumo Shrine, Shimane, 1963
- Tatebayashi City Hall (1963)
- Hotel Tokoen (1964)
- Toku’un-ji Temple Ossuary (1965)
- Pacific Hotel Chigasaki, Kanagawa, 1966
- Miyakonojo Civic Hall, Miyazaki, 1966. Demolished.
- Waseda University Faculty of Science and Engineering Building No. 51 (1967)
- Expo Tower, Expo '70, Osaka, 1969
- Nakagin Capsule Tower (1972 - Demolished in 2022)
- BIGBOX Takadanobaba (1973)
- Setagaya Museum of Art (1985)
- Edo-Tokyo Museum, Tokyo, 1993

== Publications ==
In English:

- Matsui, G. (1977). Introduction to Structural Design in Architecture.
- Sumiyoshi, T., & Matsui, G. (1989). Wood joints in classical Japanese Architecture. Kajima Institute Publishing Co., Ltd.
- Matsui, G. (1990). Structural Design in Japanese Architecture. The Gengo Matsui's Works Editing Committee.
- Matsui, G. (1990). Fringes: A visual approach to the understanding of structures. Kajima Institute Publishing Co., Ltd.
