= Nakagin Capsule Tower =

Former building in Ginza, Tokyo

Nakagin Capsule Tower Building
- 中銀カプセルタワービル
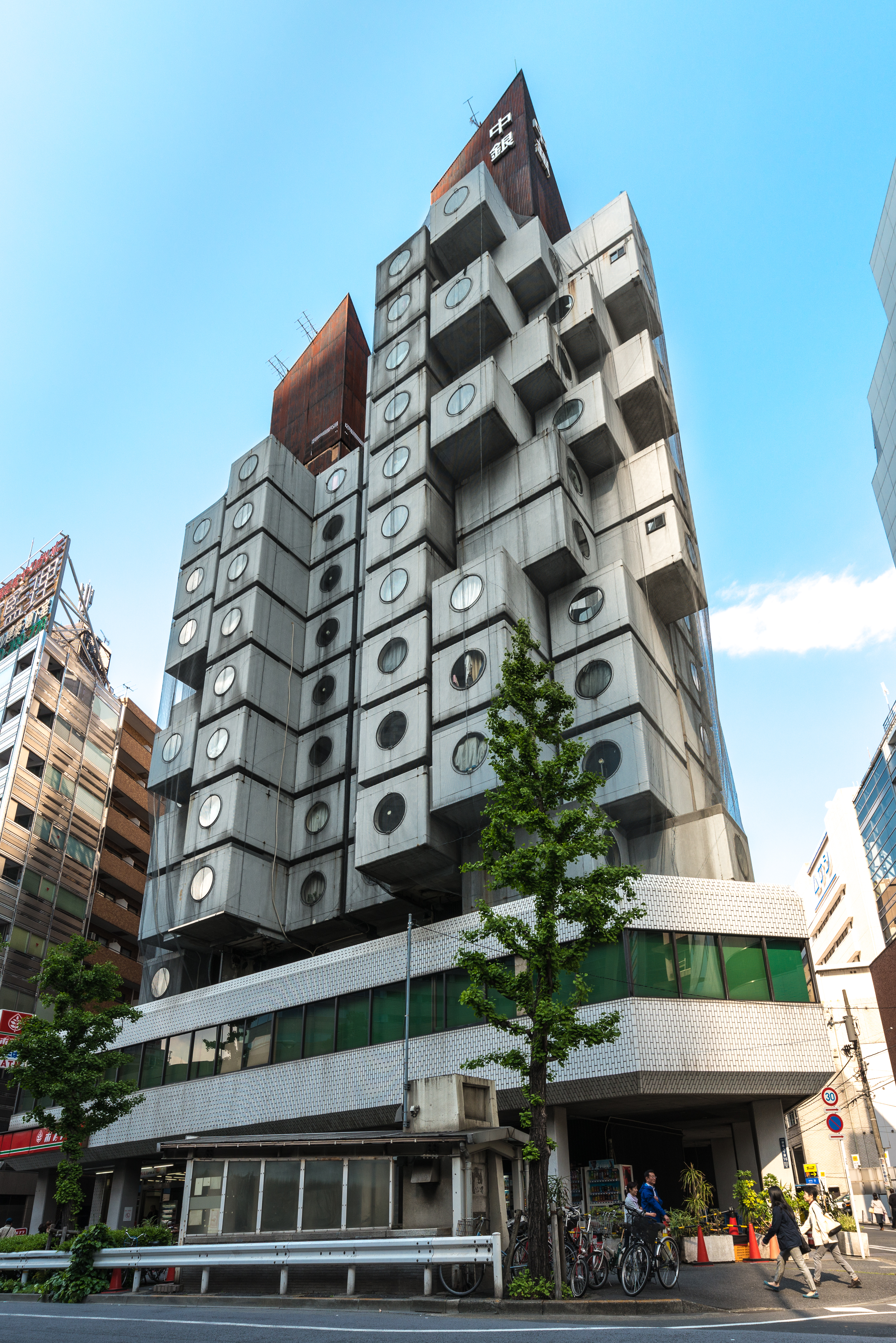
- The Nakagin Capsule Tower Building in 2013

General information
- Type: Residential, office
- Architectural style: Metabolism
- Location: 8 Chome-16-10 Ginza, Chūō-ku, Tōkyō-to 104-0061, Japan
- Coordinates: 35°39′56.20″N 139°45′48.20″E
- Construction started: 1970
- Completed: 1972
- Demolished: 2022

Technical details
- Floor count: 13
- Floor area: 3,091.23 m^{2} (33,273.7 sq ft)

Design and construction
- Architect: Kisho Kurokawa
- Structural engineer: Gengo Matsui

The Nakagin Capsule Tower Building (Note: Japanese: 中銀カプセルタワービル, Hepburn: Nakagin Kapuseru Tawā Biru) was a mixed-use residential and office tower in the upscale Ginza district of Tokyo, Japan, designed by the architect Kisho Kurokawa. Completed in two years (1970–1972), the building was a rare remaining example of Japanese Metabolism, an architectural movement emblematic of Japan's postwar cultural resurgence. It was the world's first example of capsule architecture.

In time, however, the Capsule Tower fell into disrepair. Attempts to raise funds to save the Tower and campaigns to preserve it as a historic landmark were unsuccessful. The building was demolished in 2022, although 23 component units were earmarked for preservation and later repurposed elsewhere.

== Design ==
=== Towers ===
Capsule arrangement

3F

4F/5F

6F/9F (bridge decks)

7F

8F

10F

11F

12F (bridge deck)

13F

The building was composed of two interconnected concrete towers, 11 and 13 floors tall, (Note: Maximum height above ground level was 53.5 and 47.4 m (176 and 156 ft) for the 13- and 11-storey towers, respectively.) which housed 140 self-contained prefabricated capsules in total; most floors had eight capsules per tower, with a few exceptions. There were three bridge decks (6F, 9F, and 12F), each connecting the two towers with an external balcony.

The cores were rigid-frame, consisting of a steel frame and reinforced concrete. From the basement to the second floor, ordinary concrete was used; above those levels, lightweight concrete was used. Shuttering consisted of large panels the height of a single storey of the tower. In order to make early use of the staircase, precast concrete was used in the floor plates and the elevator shafts. Because the construction schedule used a repeating pattern of two days of steel-frame work, followed by two days of precast-concrete work, the staircase was completely operational by the time the framework was finished. Onsite construction of the elevators was shortened by incorporating the 3D frames, the rails, and anchor indicator boxes in the precast concrete elements and by employing prefabricated cages.

Common spaces (June 2021)

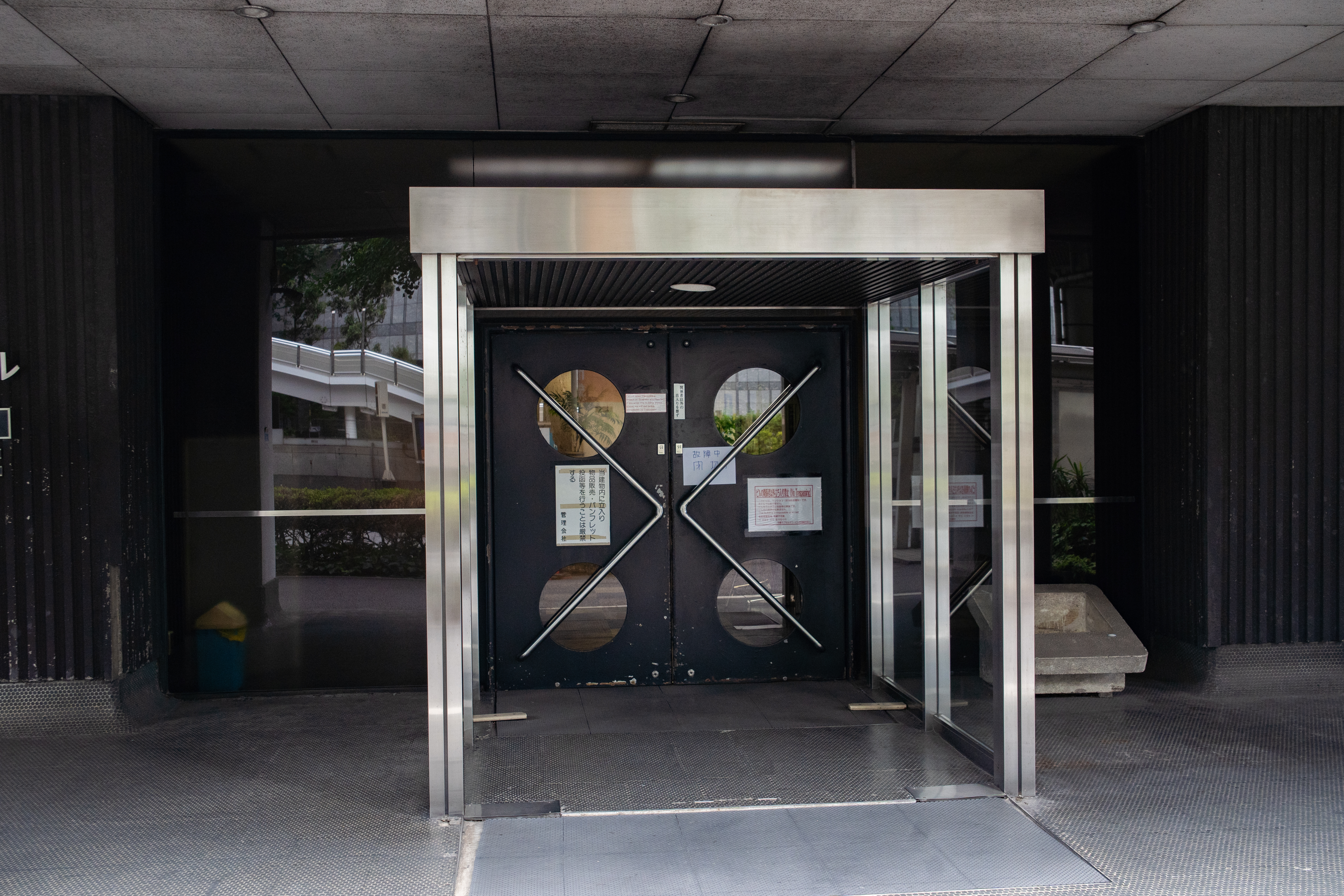
Entrance

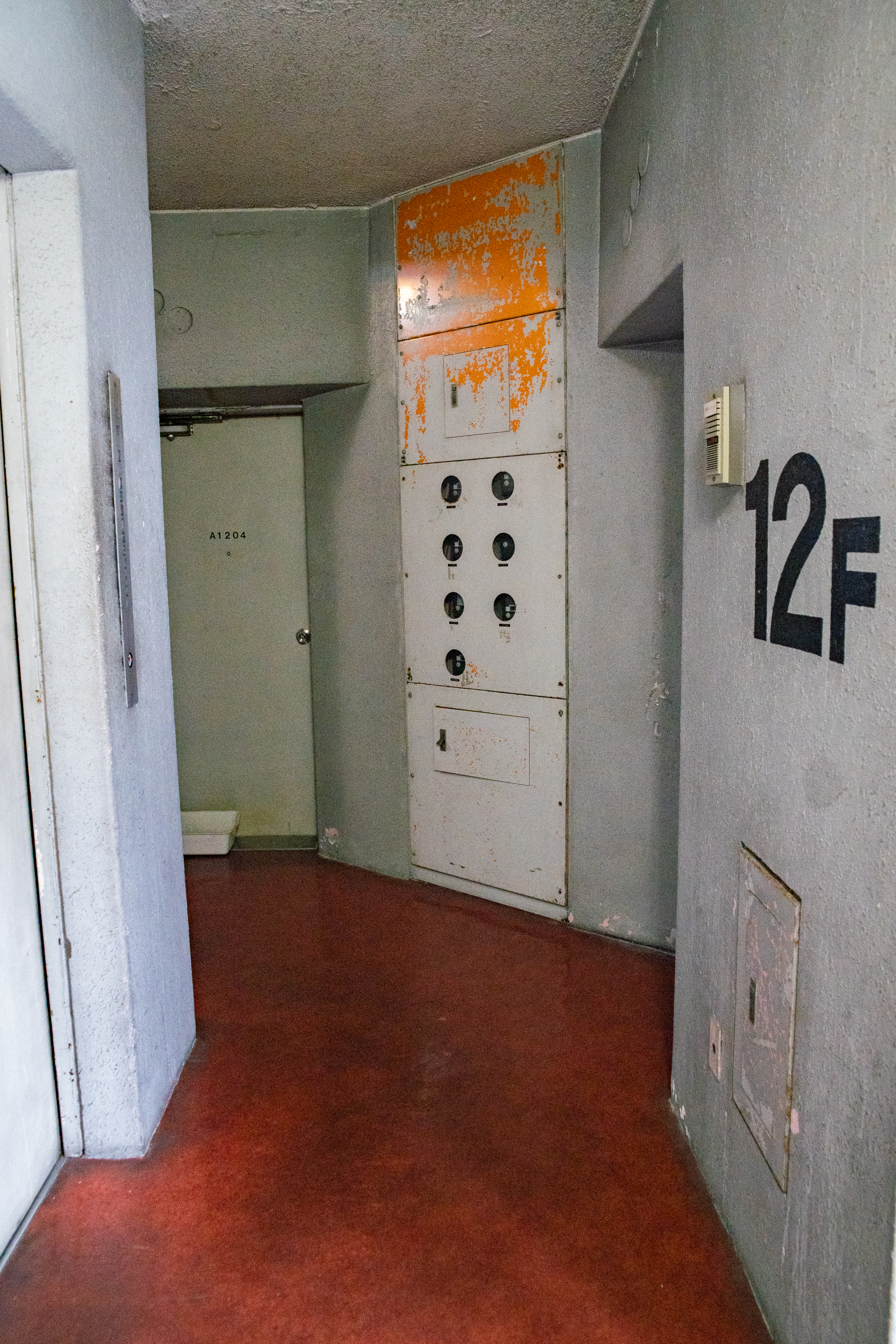
Interior (12F)

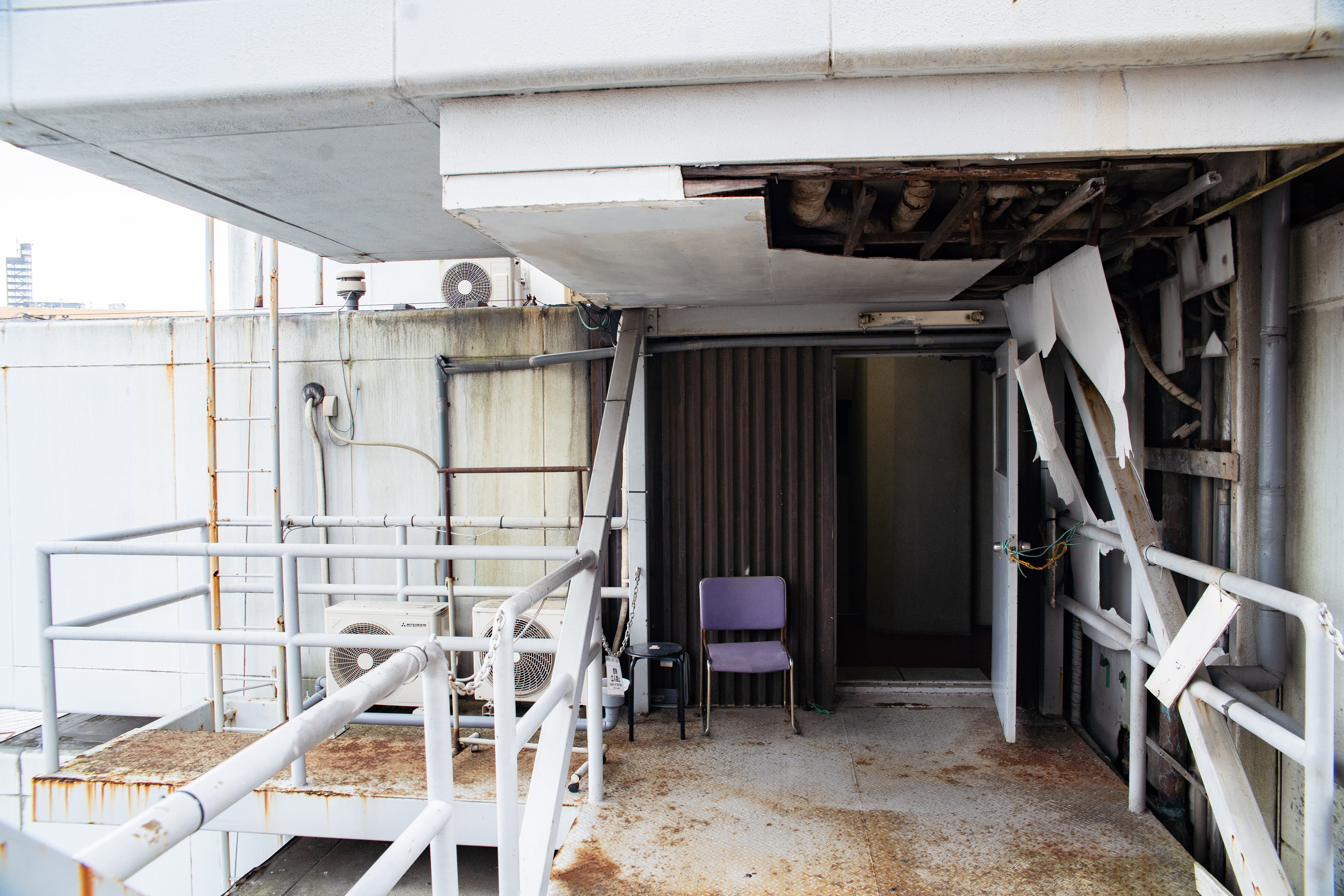
Bridge deck

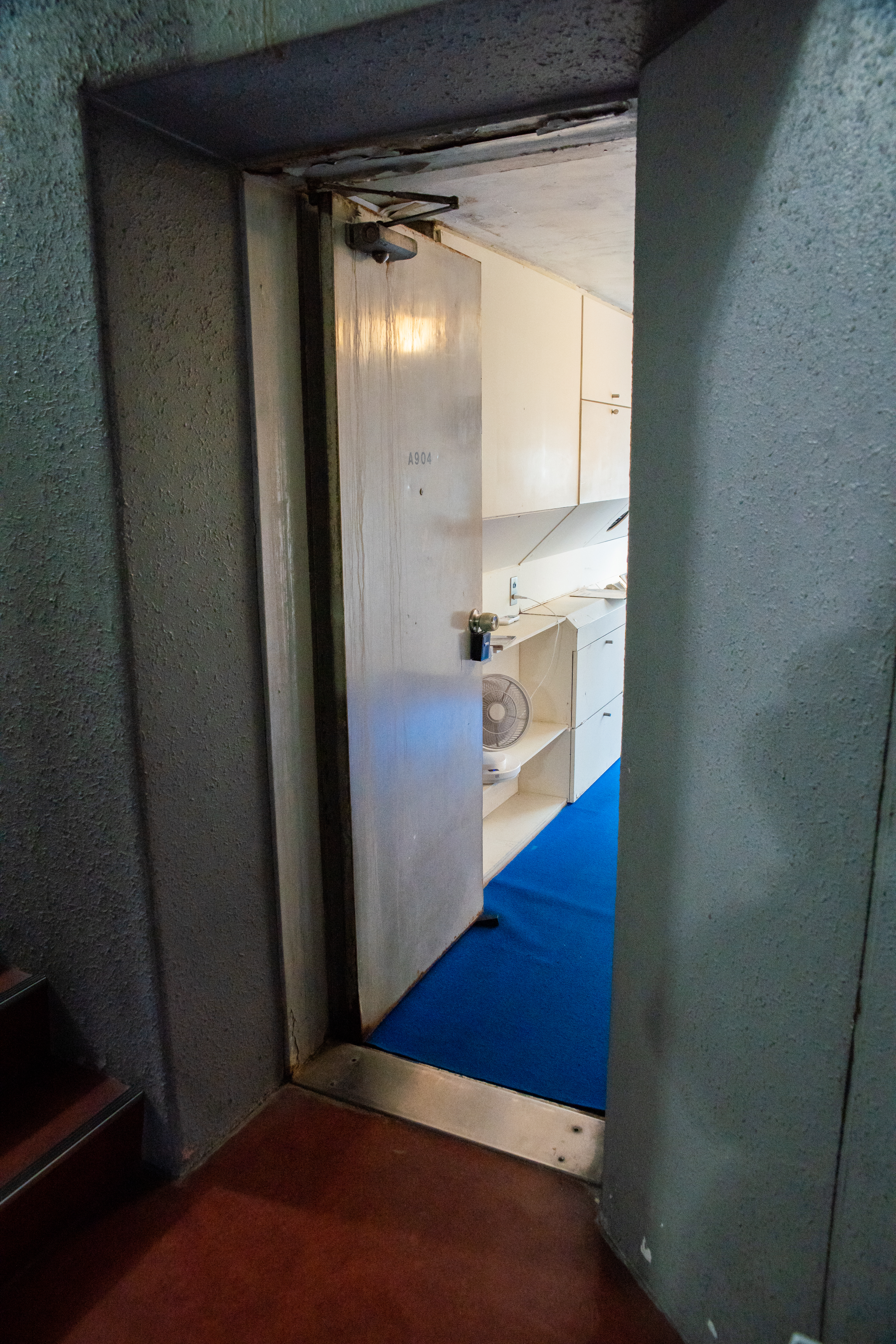
Capsule entrance (A904)

The architect said the building's asymmetry reflected the Japanese aesthetic, stating that "Japanese architectural tradition rejects symmetry." As well, he notes, the dimensions of the capsules "are the exact dimensions of a traditional Japanese tea-room".

=== Capsules ===
Capsule types and counts
Equipment side Type	L	R
A	29	26
B	18	0
C	24	31
D	12	0

Each capsule measured 2.5 m × 2.5 m × 4.0 m (8.2 ft × 8.2 ft × 13.1 ft) (Note: Height, width, and length) with a circular window 1.3 m (4.3 ft) in diameter at one end; the capsule functioned as a small individual living or office space, with an in-unit bathroom. Although the capsules were designed with mass production in mind, no additional capsules were produced after the initial construction and none of the original capsules was ever replaced.

The capsules were fitted with utilities and interior fittings before being shipped to the building site, where they were attached to the concrete towers. Each capsule was attached independently to one of the two towers by only four high-tension bolts and cantilevered from the shaft, so that a single capsule could be removed easily without affecting the others. Plumbing for each capsule is connected through a flexible umbilical, approximately 1 m (3 ft 3 in) long. The original design concept envisioned combining specialized capsules into larger living spaces but it isn't clear whether this option was ever implemented.

The capsules were all-welded lightweight steel-truss boxes clad in galvanized, rib-reinforced steel panels which had been coated with rust-preventative paint and finished with a coat of Kenitex glossy spray after processing. The offsite factory that assembled the capsules also built intermodal containers and the welding jig for the capsules was modified from the container assembly line. Major structural elements were fireproofed with a coat of sprayed asbestos 45 mm (1.8 in) thick, while the exterior panels were coated with the same substance to 30 mm (1.2 in) thick.

Typical capsule design & interior

Floor plan

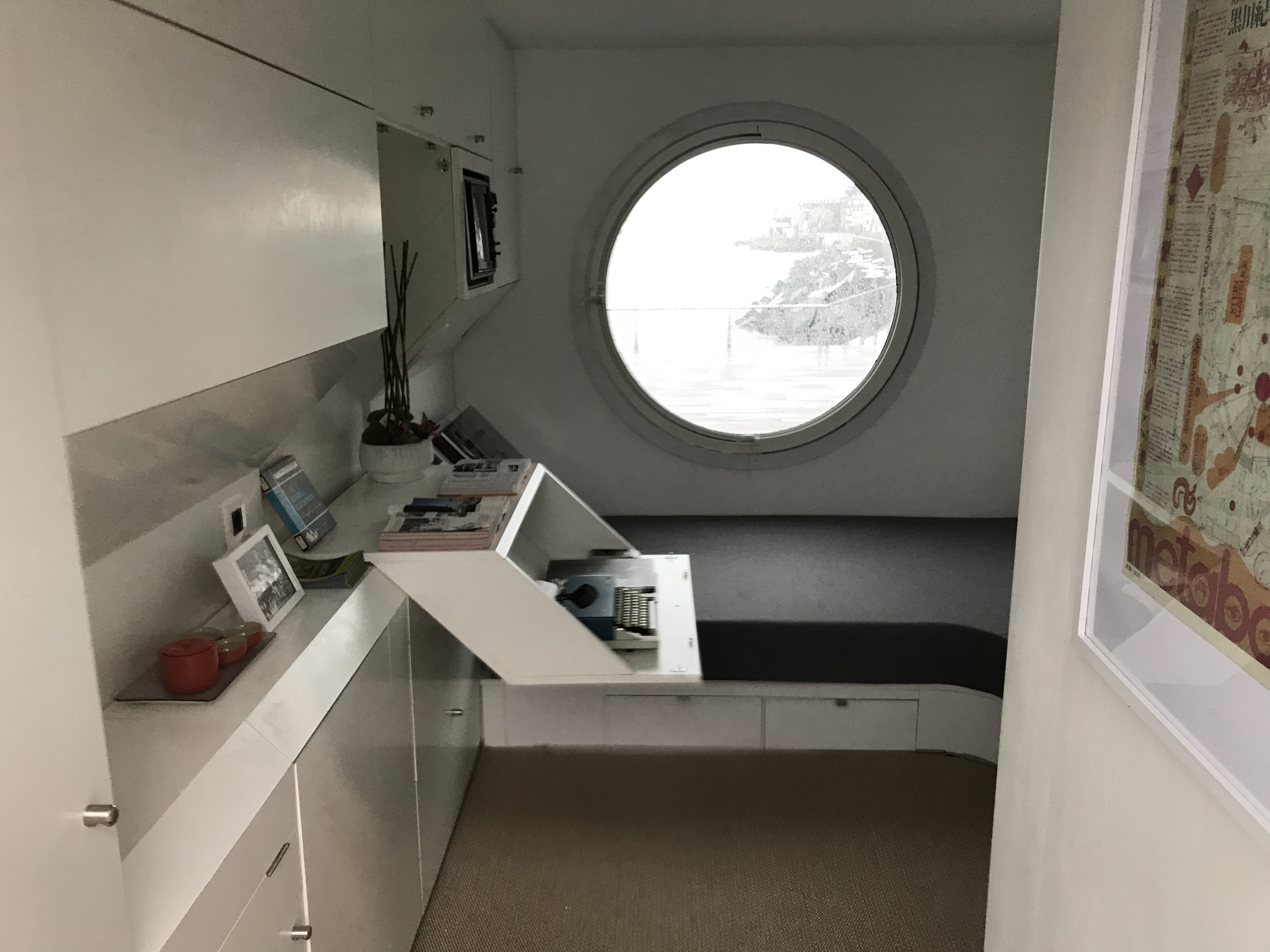
Replica of a sample room

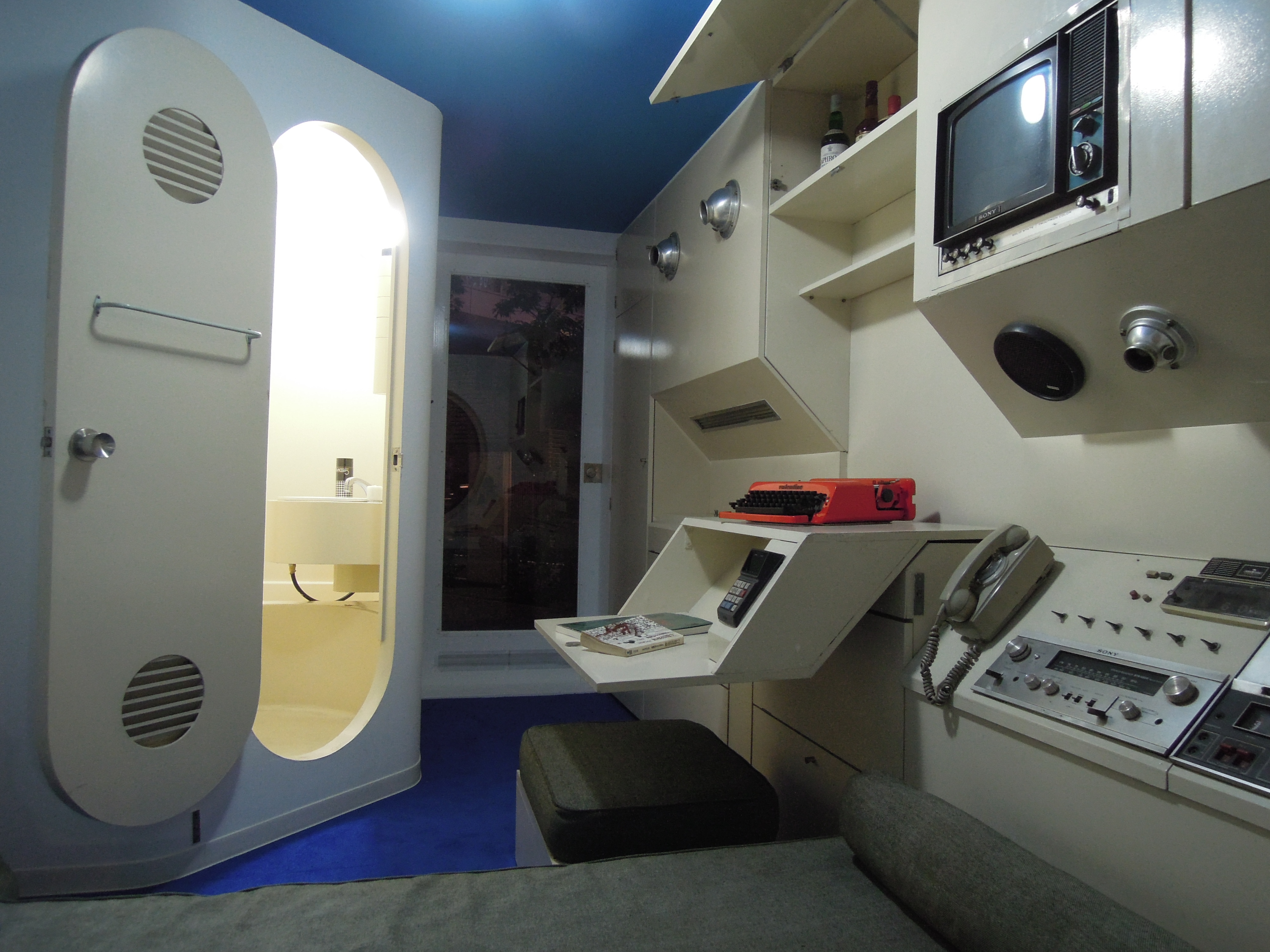
Reverse angle, looking toward entrance

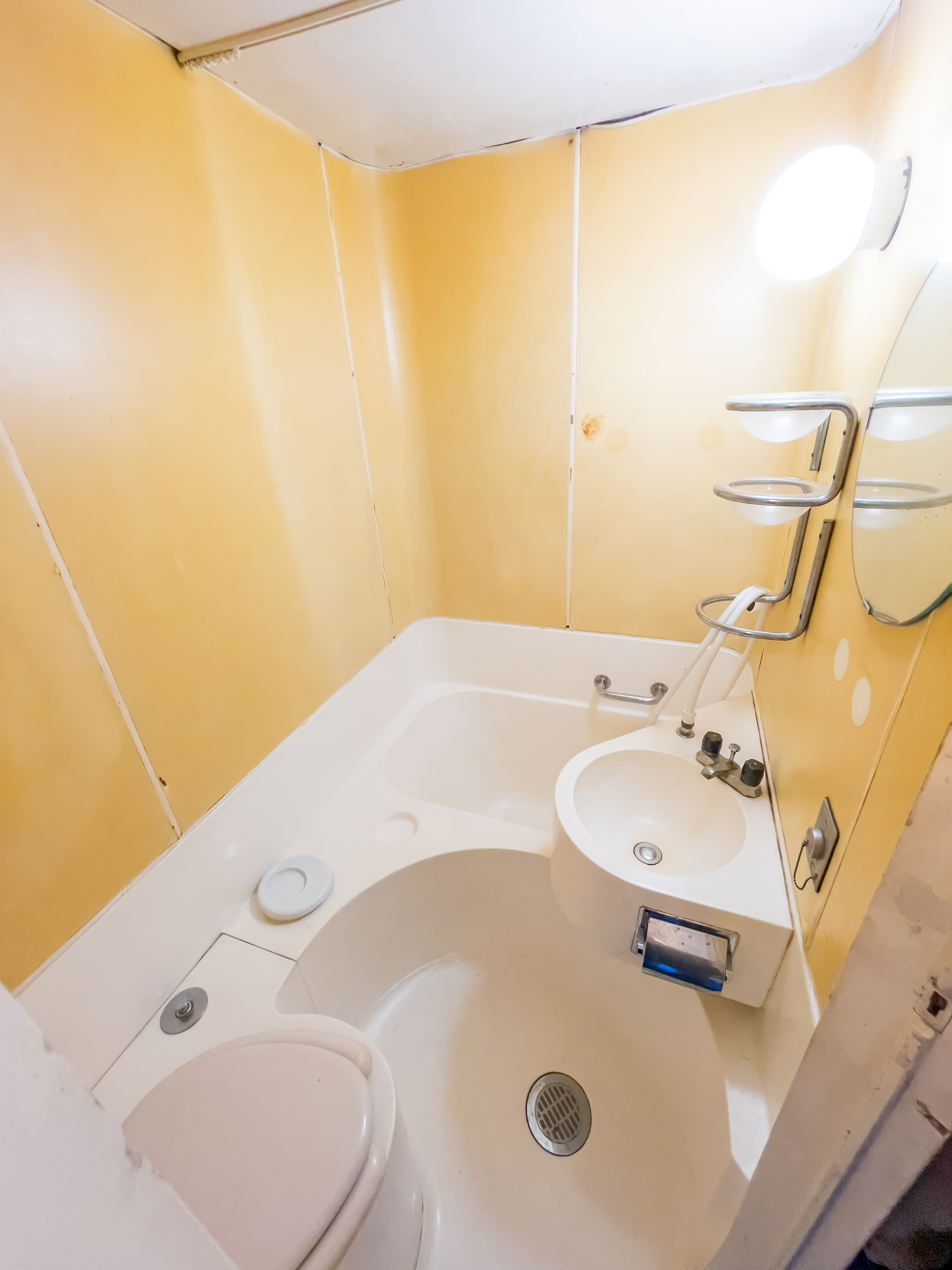
Bathroom

The original target demographic was bachelor Tokyo salarymen. The compact pieds-à-terre included a wall of appliances and cabinets built into one side, including a kitchen stove, a refrigerator, a television set, and a reel-to-reel tape deck. A bathroom unit, about the size of an aircraft lavatory, was set into an opposite corner. A large circular window over the bed dominated the far end of the room. Optional extras such as a stereo were also originally available.

== History ==
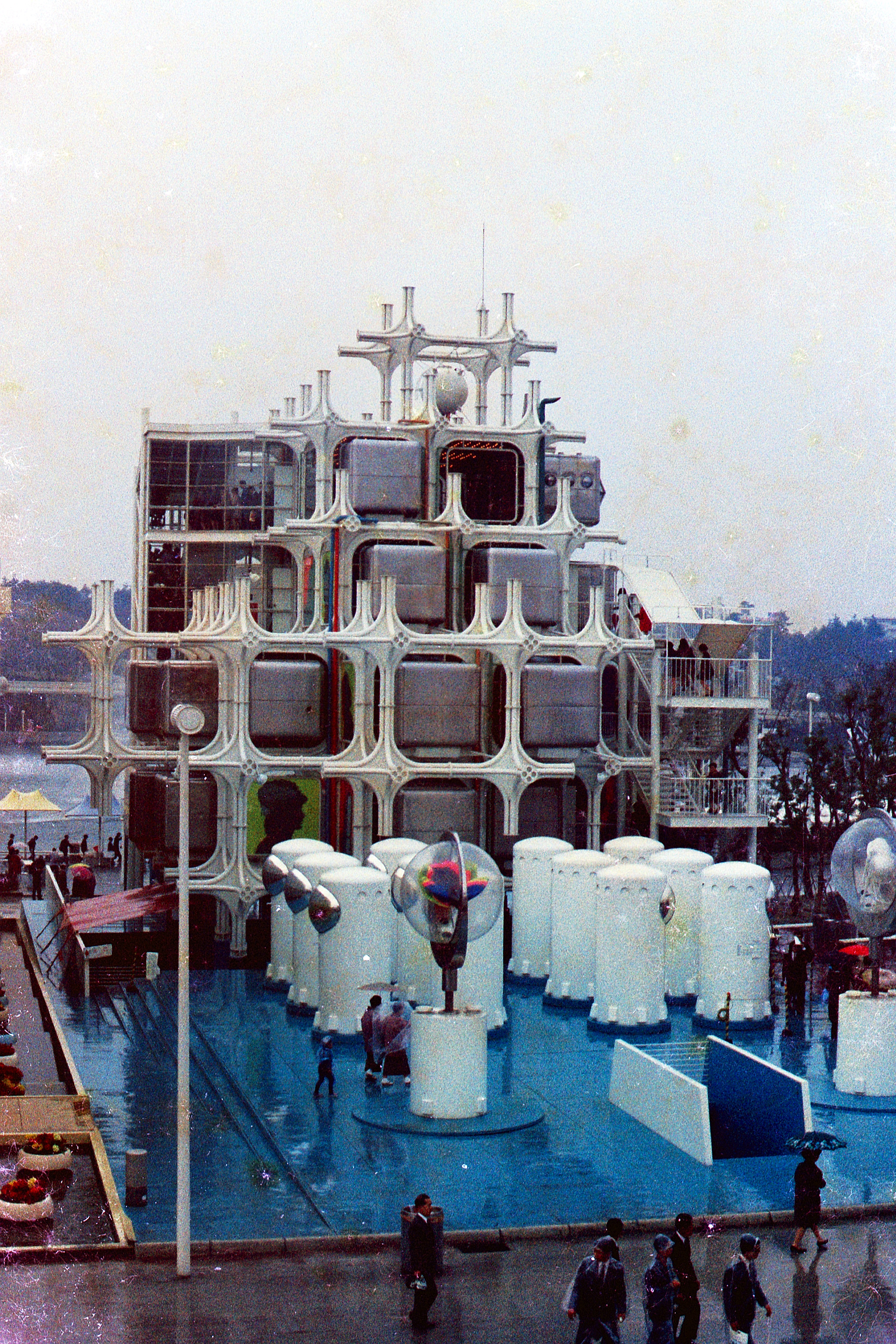
Takara Holdings Pavilion at Expo '70

The Metabolist movement was launched in 1960 by a group of architects, designers, and critics including Kurokawa, Kiyonori Kikutake, Masato Otaka, Fumihiko Maki, Noboru Kawazoe, Kenji Ekuan, and Kiyoshi Awazu. Its opening salvo was the publication of Metabolism: the Proposals for New Urbanism at the World Design Conference in Tokyo. "The name, taken from the biological concept, came from an image of architecture and cities that shared the ability of living organisms to keep growing, reproducing, and transforming in response to their environments," notes a webpage for "Metabolism: The City of the Future," a 2011 exhibition at the Mori Art Museum in Tokyo. "Their ideas were magnificent and surprising, with concepts such as marine cities that spanned Tokyo Bay, and cities connected by highways in the sky where automobiles pass between clusters of high-rise buildings. Metabolism emerged at a time when Japan had recovered from the devastation of war and entered a period of rapid economic growth. People felt that creating ideal cities would be a way to build better communities."

The group advocated for the development of megastructures, most of which were not realized due to societal changes in the 1970s resulting from energy crises and environmental considerations.

Kurokawa began exploring modular capsule architecture with the design of the Takara Beautilion at Expo '70 in Osaka, which used a framework of steel tubes to support stainless steel-clad cubic capsules displaying beauty products from Takara Holdings. At the same exposition, Kurokawa also designed a capsule house, suspended from the space frame roof of the Symbol Zone. Impressed by the Beautilion, Torizo Watanabe retained Kurokawa to design a similar permanent building for his real estate company, Nakagin, to serve business owners and employees as a second home for occasional overnight stays in central Tokyo.

=== Construction, 1970–1972 ===
Construction occurred both onsite in the upscale Ginza district of Tokyo, and off-site. On-site work included the two towers with their energy-supply and piping systems and equipment, while the capsule parts were fabricated and assembled at a factory 450 km (280 mi) from Tokyo. Five to eight capsules were attached per day, and the capsule attachment process took thirty days to complete. Due to on-site storage and traffic limitations, only the capsules that were to be attached that day were delivered overnight.

As completed, the building was intended to serve mainly visiting businessmen, primarily as a hotel, but offering some studio apartments for short-term stays. The maximum cost of a capsule in 1972 was US$14,600 (equivalent to $112,400 in 2025).

=== Update proposals and demolition decision, 2006–2022 ===
Outside and inside views of the Nakagin Capsule Tower while it still existed in 2018.

The capsules could be individually removed or replaced, but at a cost: when demolition was first being considered in 2006, it was estimated that renovation would require approximately ¥6.2 million per capsule. The original concept was that individual capsules would be repaired or replaced every 25 years; but the capsules deteriorated since the repairs were never done.

80% of the capsule owners had to approve demolition, which was first achieved on 15 April 2007. A majority of capsule owners, citing squalid, cramped conditions as well as concerns over asbestos, voted to demolish the building and replace it with a much larger, more modern tower. In the interest of preserving his design, Kurokawa proposed taking advantage of the flexible design by "unplugging" the existing boxes and replacing them with updated units. The plan was supported by the major architectural associations of Japan, including the Japan Institute of Architects; but the residents countered with concerns over the building's earthquake resistance and its inefficient use of valuable property adjacent to the high-value Ginza. Kurokawa died in 2007, and for a time a developer for renovation had yet to be found, partly because of the late-2000s recession.

Opposing slated demolition, Nicolai Ouroussoff, architecture critic for The New York Times, described Nakagin Capsule Tower in 2009 as "gorgeous architecture; like all great buildings, it is the crystallization of a far-reaching cultural ideal. Its existence also stands as a powerful reminder of paths not taken, of the possibility of worlds shaped by different sets of values."

In 2010, the hot water to the building was shut off. In 2014 Masato Abe, a capsule owner, former resident and founder of the "Save Nakagin Tower" project stated that the project attempted to gain donations from around the world to purchase all of the capsules and preserve the building. In 2018, a real estate company wanted to redevelop the tower and purchased the land and a few capsules, but failed during the COVID-19 pandemic.

In May 2021, a number of outlets reported that the management company of the building had voted to sell the complex to the original landowner, reigniting speculation over potential demolition and redevelopment. In November 2021, the building housed 20 tenants. An attempt to sell it to a new owner fell through. Demolition of the Nakagin Capsule Tower Building began on 12 April 2022.

=== Preservation and restoration efforts ===
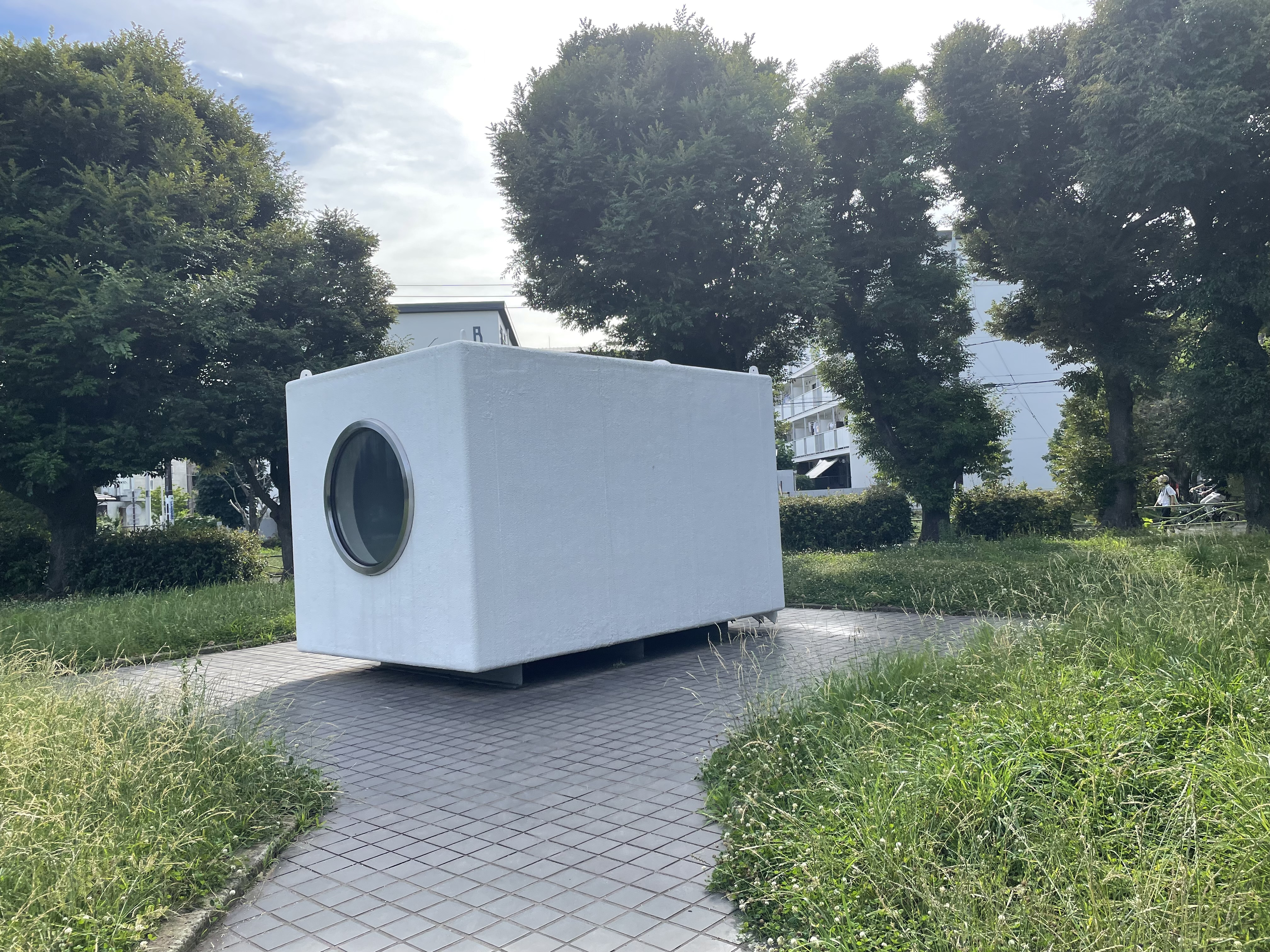
A preserved capsule on display in the grounds of the Museum of Modern Art, Saitama

Since the building was regarded as a masterpiece of Metabolist architecture, a project team led by Gluon had launched a 3D digital archiving project to preserve the entire building in 3D data in order to preserve its architectural value. In this project, the entire building was scanned using a combination of laser scan data that accurately measures distances in millimeters and more than 20,000 photographs taken by cameras and drones. The resulting scan allowed an augmented reality version of the Nakagin Capsule Tower Building to be created.

Prior to its demolition, numerous capsules from the building were earmarked for preservation. Of the 140 capsules, the Nakagin Capsule Tower Building Preservation and Regeneration Project preserved 23 capsules. These capsules were cleaned of asbestos and refurbished; as of 2024, 16 of the 23 preserved capsules were intended for new destinations. In Japan, Shochiku put two capsules on permanent display in an event hall in Ginza; the Osaka-based Yodogawa Steel Works placed one on a trailer undercarriage as a mobile display; one was acquired by The Museum of Modern Art, Wakayama, which Kurokawa also designed; and five capsules had been proposed to used as accommodation in Yokosuka, Kanagawa Prefecture, south of Tokyo. Overseas, the San Francisco Museum of Modern Art owns Kurokawa's personal capsule A1302, and the M+ museum in Hong Kong features a capsule as a semi-permanent exhibition. The Museum of Modern Art in New York ran a year-long exhibition featuring capsule A1305 from the top floor that ended on 12 July 2026.

== Other Kurokawa capsule constructions ==
Kurokawa completed "Capsule House-K" in 1973, near the resort town of Karuizawa, Nagano, using four capsules the same size as those from the Nakagin Capsule Tower as specialized rooms (Note: These are two bedrooms, a kitchen, and a tea ceremony room.) for a holiday house. "Capsule House-K" was owned by Kurokawa's studio until it went bankrupt, and subsequently was purchased by his son; it was made available for short-term rental for groups of up to seven people through Airbnb starting in May 2022.

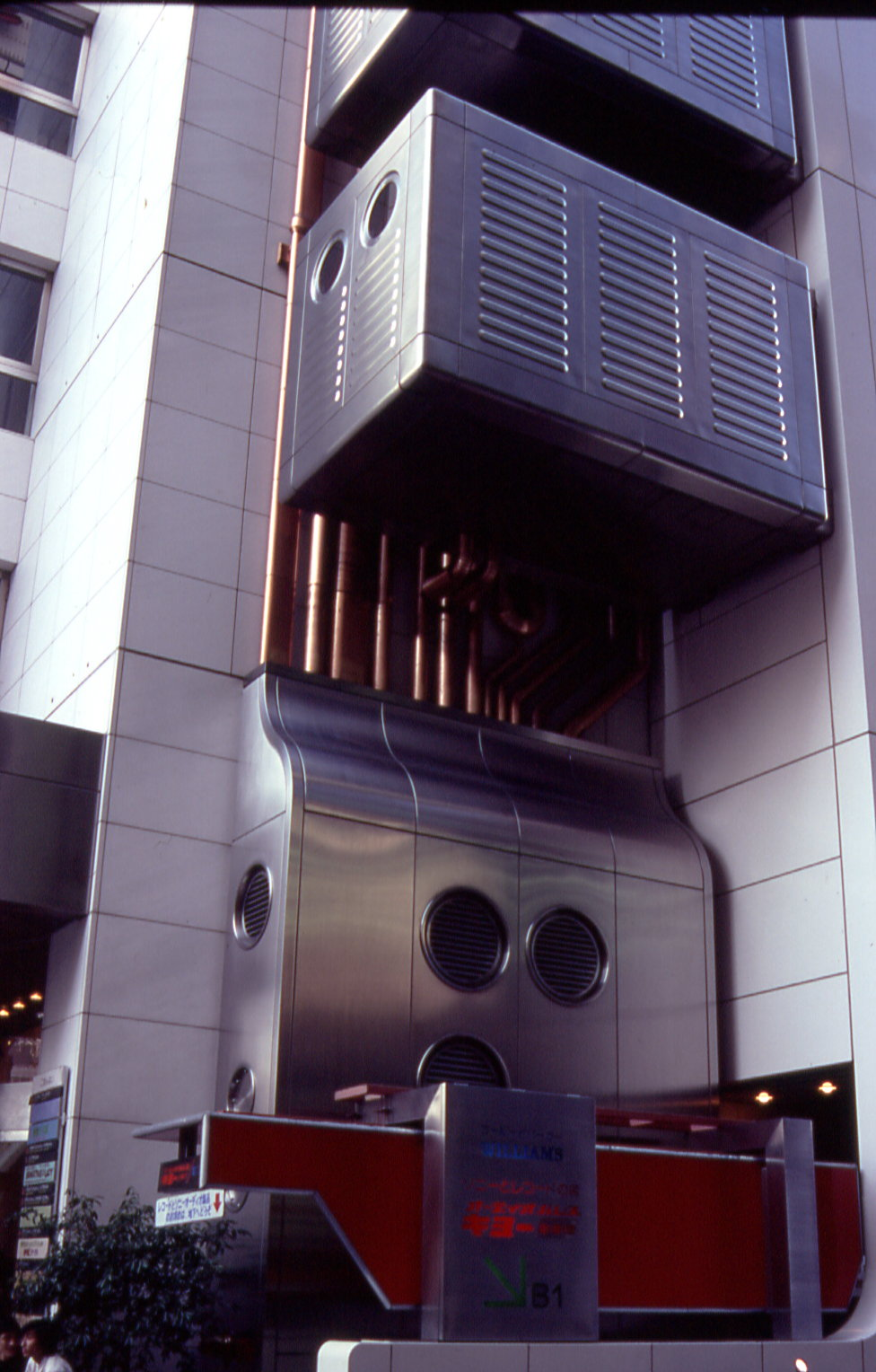
Sony Tower in Osaka, detail showing restroom capsule

In 1976, four years after the Nakagin Capsule Tower was completed, a 10-storey showroom for Sony Corporation was completed near Shinsaibashi in Chūō-ku, Osaka, using a similar modular design from Kurokawa with stainless steel-clad capsule restroom modules hung from the central tower. Sony Tower (Osaka) was demolished in 2006.

== See also ==
- Capsule hotel
- Sharifi-ha House
