= The National Art Center, Tokyo =

Art museum in Tokyo, Japan

Coordinates: 35.66528°N 139.72634°E

The National Art Center of Tokyo
- 国立新美術館

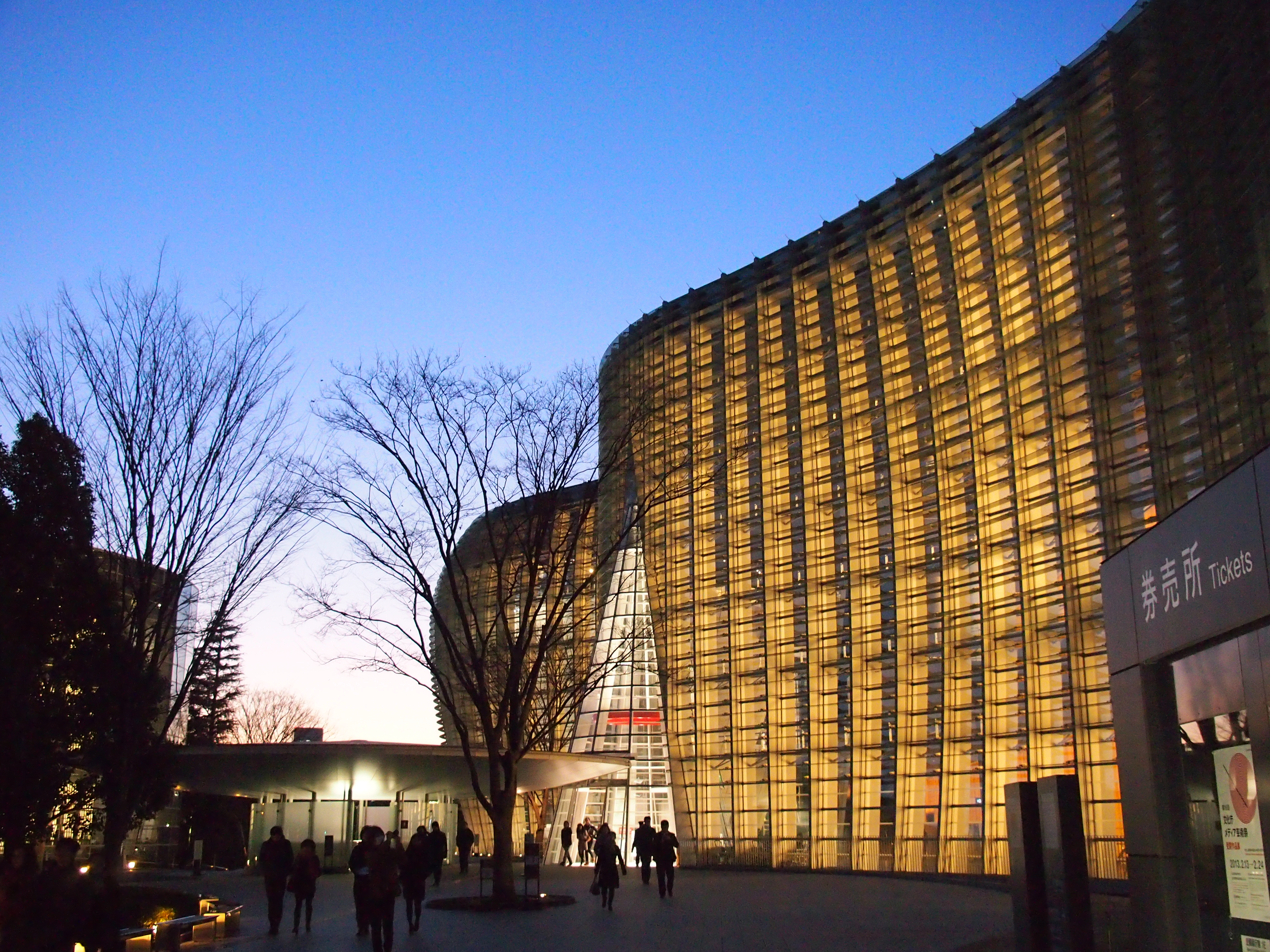
- The museum from the outside

- Location within Tokyo Yamanote Loop Location within Tokyo wards area
- Established: 21 January 2007; 19 years ago
- Location: Roppongi, Minato, Tokyo, Japan
- Type: Art museum
- Visitors: 2,271,487 (2023)
- Director: Eriko Osaka
- Website: www.nact.jp

The National Art Center, Tokyo (国立新美術館, Kokuritsu Shin-Bijutsukan) (NACT) is a museum in Roppongi, Minato, Tokyo, Japan. Opened in January 2007, it is one of the five institutions of the Independent Administrative Institution National Museum of Art. Designed by architect Kisho Kurokawa, it was final completed project before his death in 2007.

Unlike the other national art museums, NACT does not maintain a permanent collection but instead functions as flexible venue hosting temporary special exhibitions and exhibitions organized by public art associations.

== Overview ==
The National Art Center was constructed on the former site of the University of Tokyo's Institute of Industrial Science and is adjacent to the National Graduate Institute for Policy Studies. The facility was established as a joint project by the Agency for Cultural Affairs' NACT Establishment Office and the National Museums Independent Administrative. It was the first new national art museum built in Japan in thirty years, following the opening of the National Museum of Art, Osaka in 1977.

NACT consists of one basement level and four above-ground floors, with a site area of 30,000 m^{2} and a total floor area of about 49,830 m^{2}. The six main exhibition rooms (A–F) on the first and second floors each measure about 1,000 m^{2} with ceilings 8m high.

The facility is an "art center" and not considered a "museum", given that it does not own a collection and permanent display. The policy has been successful. In its first fiscal year in 2007, it had 69 exhibitions organized by arts groups and 10 organized by NACT. Its Monet exhibition, held between 7 April and 2 July 2007, was the second most visited exhibition of the year, not only in Japan but in the world.

Architect Kisho Kurokawa designed the building, which is characterized by its wave-like glass curtain wall façade and the concept of a "museum in a forest." Inside, the center also houses a museum shop, library, restaurants, and cafés. This was Kurokawa's final completed architectural project.

Its graphic visual identity was developed by graphic designer Kashiwa Sato of Tokyo-based Samurai Inc.

== History and milestones ==
Planning for the National Art Center began in 1996, with construction starting in 2002. The official name was announced in June 2003, and the building was completed on 14 June 2006. The center opened to the public on 21 January 2007.

The facility quickly became one of the most visited art museums in the country. It welcomed its 10 millionth visitor in 2010, its 20 millionth in 2015, and its 30 millionth in 2018.

In 2016, the facility recorded 2.6 million visitors and ranked 40th worldwide in The Art Newspaper's 2025 survey of museum attendance.

== Facilities ==
- Exhibition Galleries: Six halls (Rooms A–F) on the first and second floors.
- Art Library: Open to the public with holdings on modern and contemporary art.
- Art Commons: Multipurpose space for lectures, workshops, and small exhibitions.
- Dining: Several cafés and restaurants, including facilities in the atrium’s conical structures.
- Museum Shop: Offers exhibition catalogs, art books, and related merchandise.
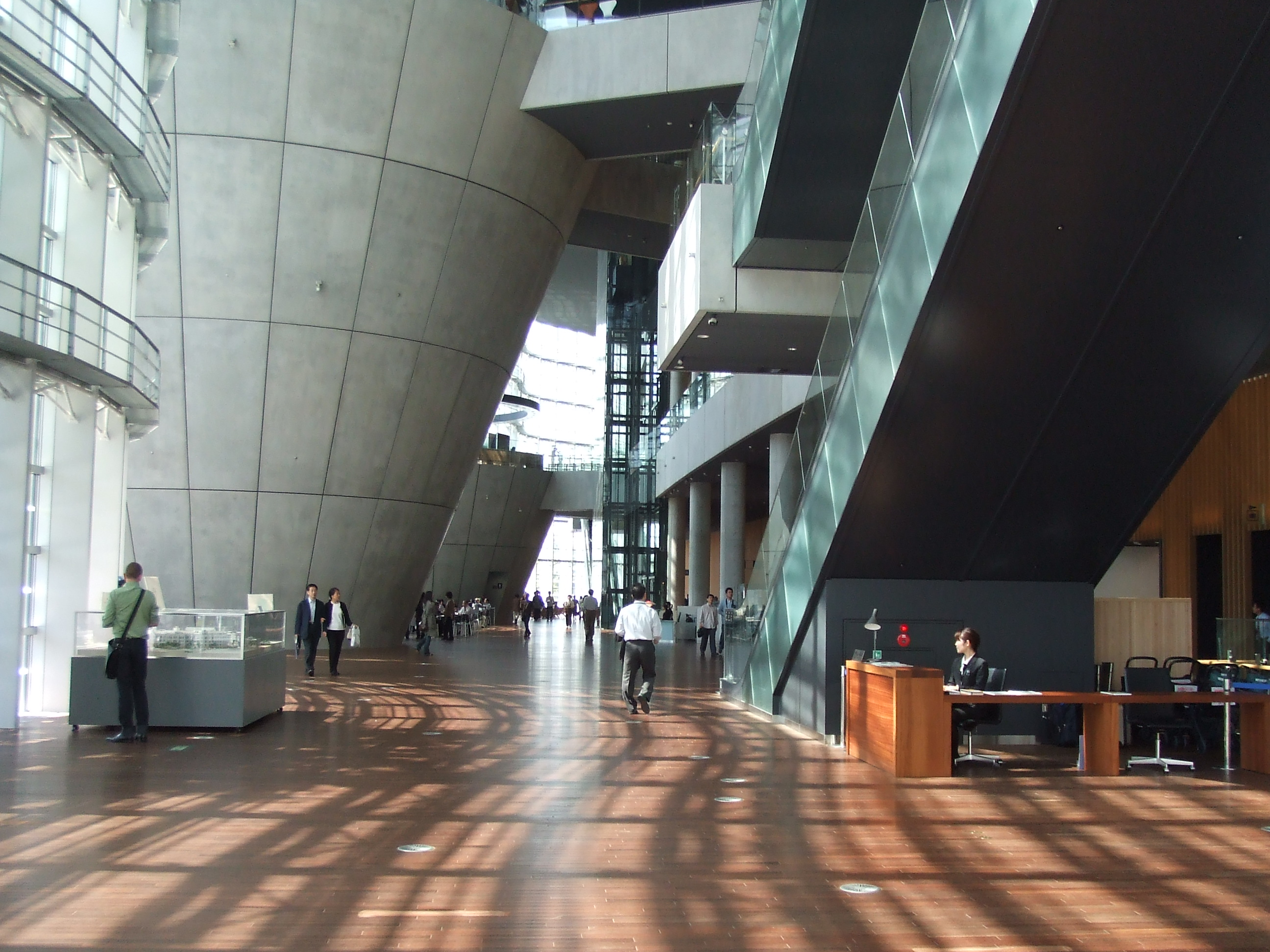
Lobby

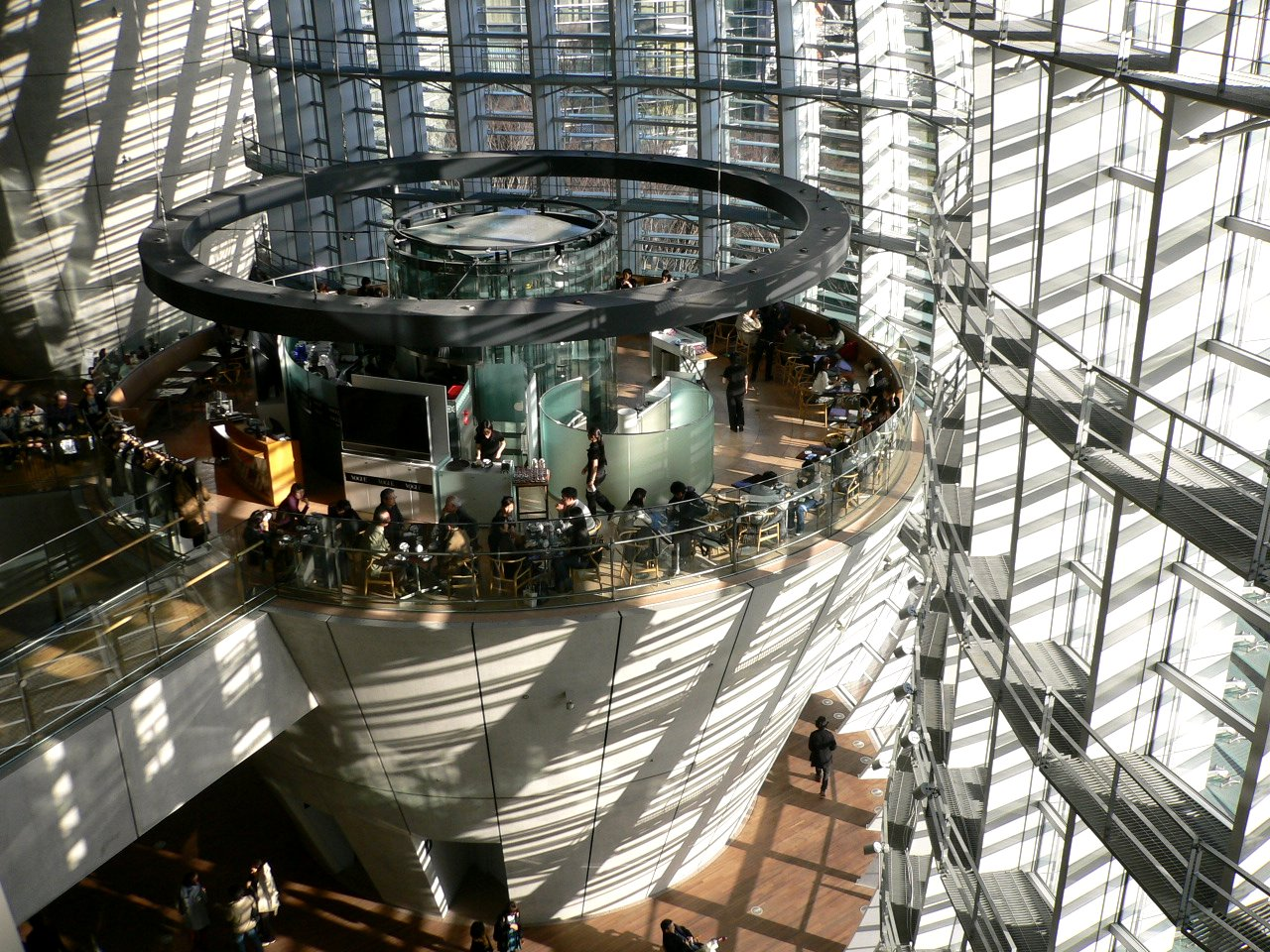
Brasserie Paul Bocuse Le Musée

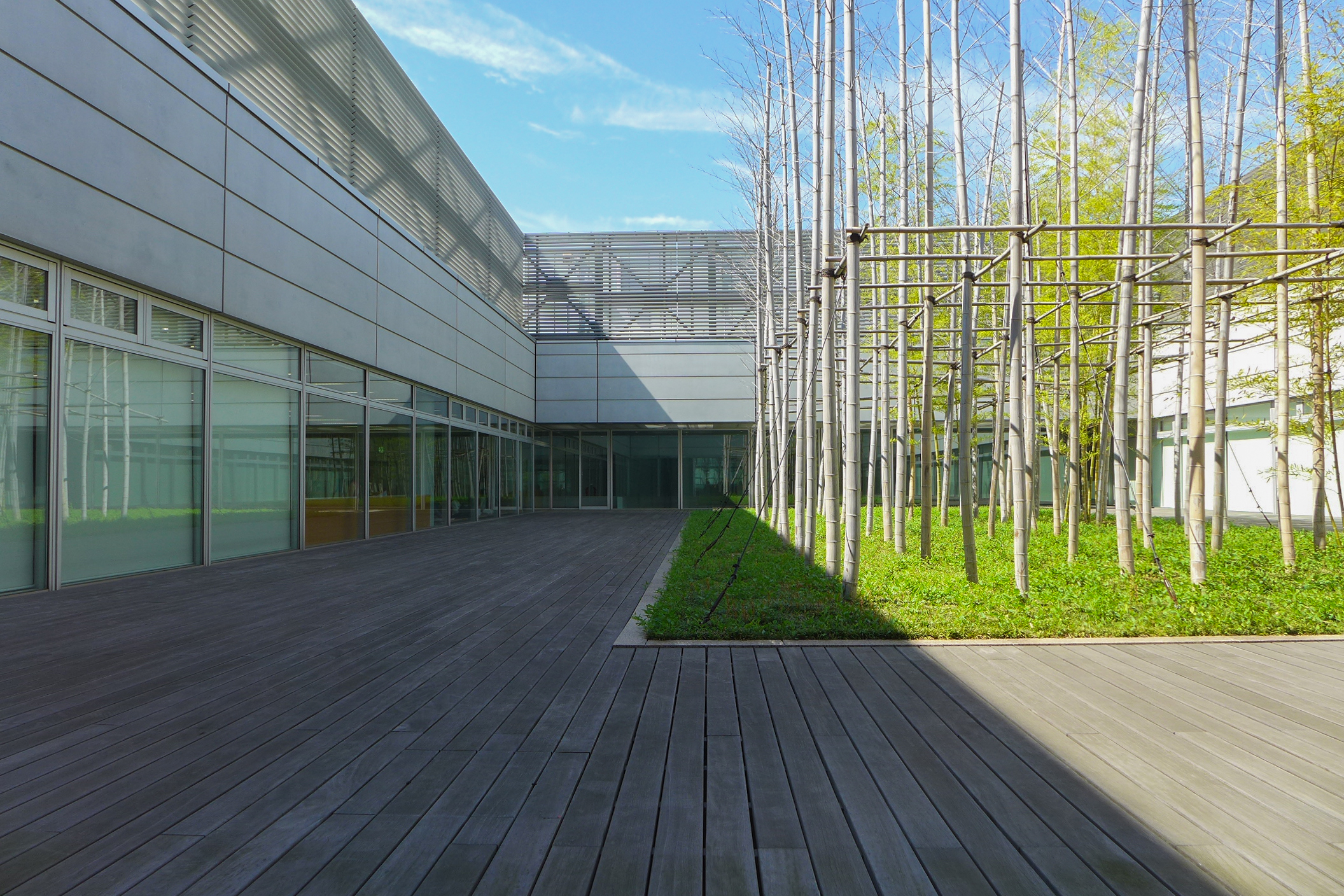
Courtyard

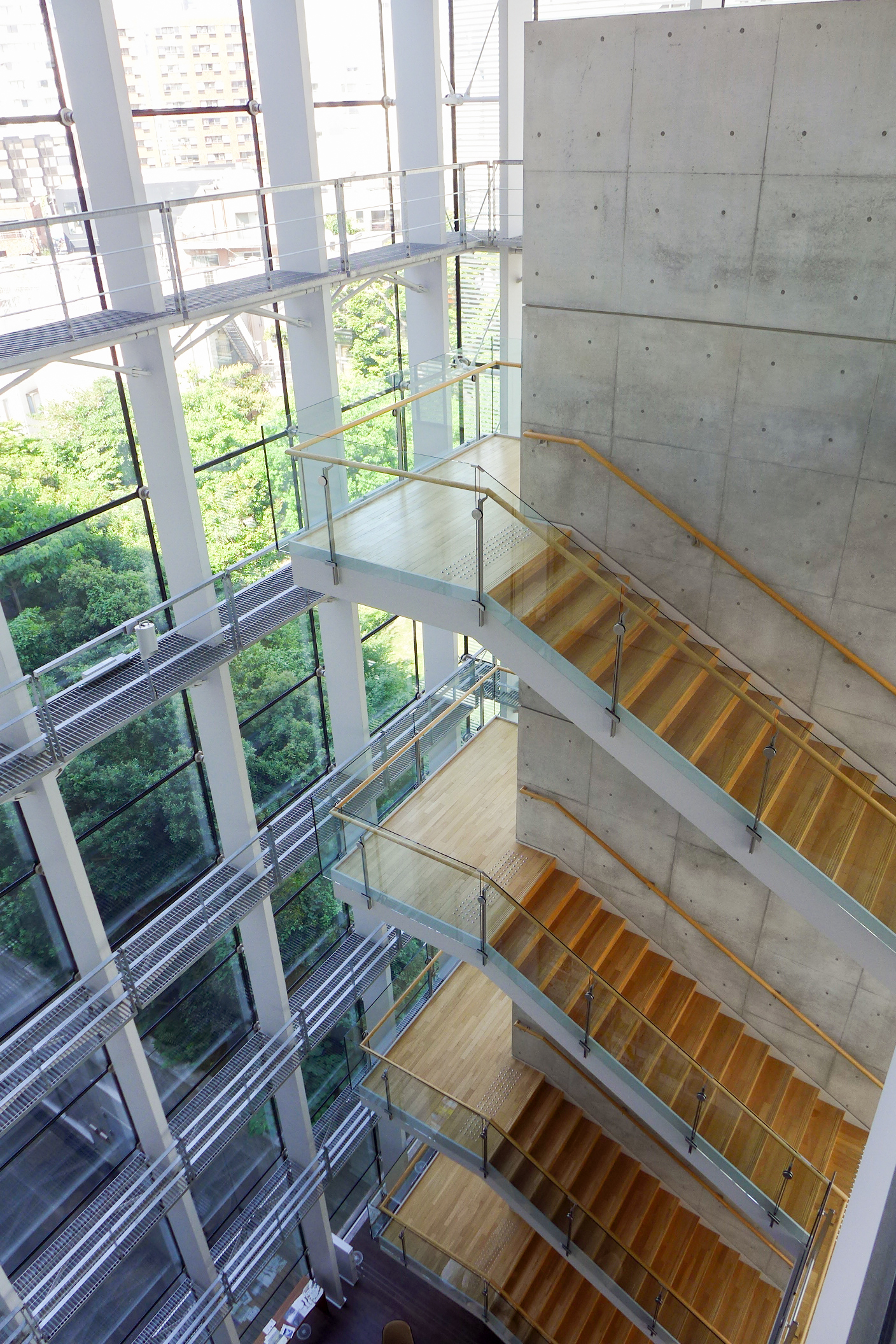
Stairs

== Access ==
The National Art Center is directly connected to Nogizaka Station (Tokyo Metro Chiyoda Line, Exit 6). It is also accessible from Roppongi Station (Tokyo Metro Hibiya Line and Toei Ōedo Line), about a 4–5 minute walk from Exit 4a or Exit 7.

== In popular culture ==
The museum appears in the animated romantic fantasy film Your Name (2016) as the setting of a date between characters Taki Tachibana and Miki Okudera.
