= Wakayama Prefectural Museum =

- 和歌山県立博物館
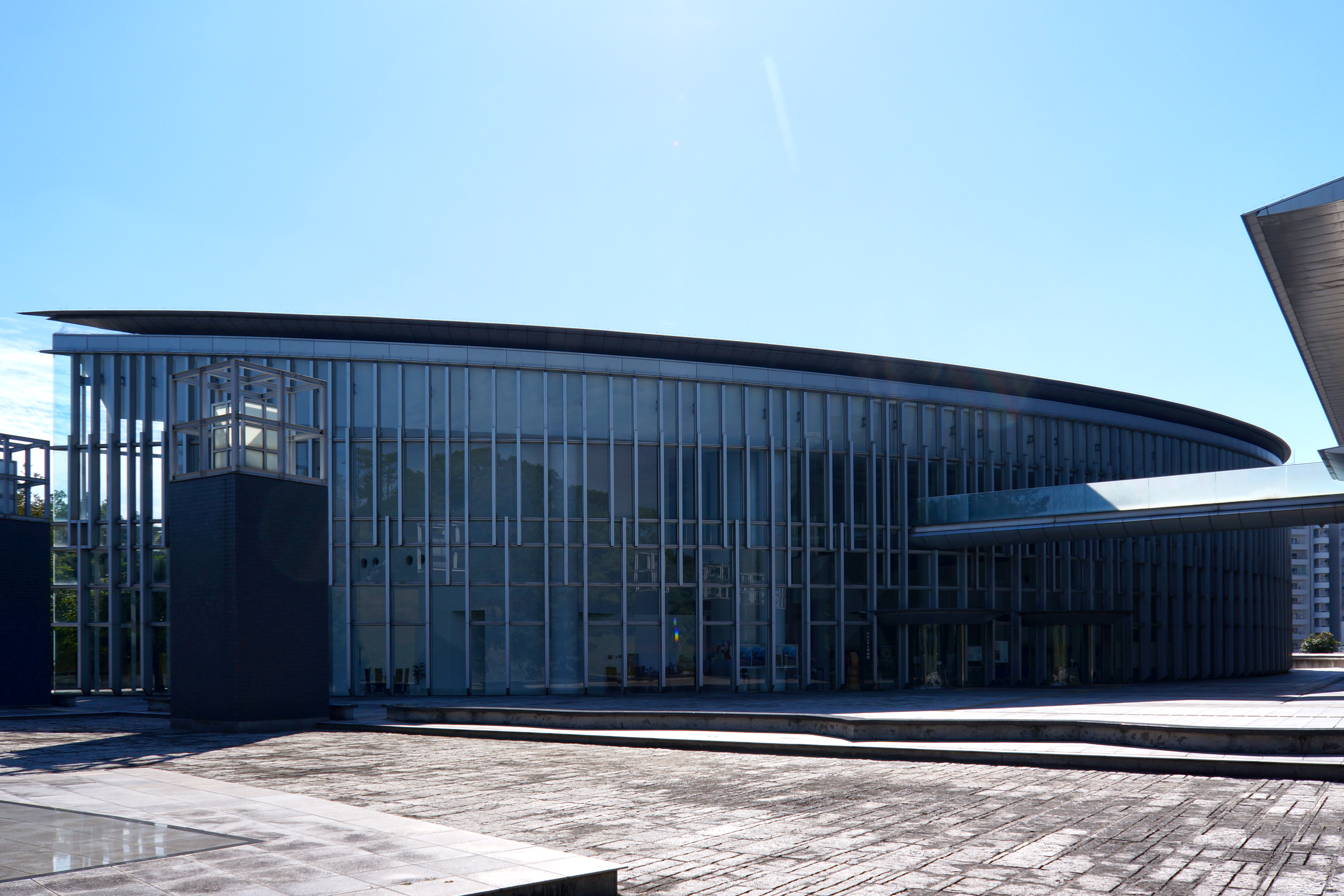
- Wakayama Prefectural Museum
- Interactive map of the Wakayama Prefectural Museum area

General information
- Location: 4-14 Fukiage, Wakayama, Wakayama Prefecture, Japan
- Coordinates: 34°13′28″N 135°10′18″E
- Opened: 1971
- Renovated: 1994
- Owner: Wakayama Prefecture

Technical details
- Floor area: 6866.6 sq meters

Website
- Official website

Wakayama Prefectural Museum (和歌山県立博物館, Wakayama Kenritsu Hakubutsukan) is a history museum in located in the city of Wakayama, Wakayama Prefecture, Japan.

The focus of the museum is the history and culture of Wakayama Prefecture, and its permanent collection displays artifacts relating to prehistory, Mount Kōya, the Kumano region, Kumano Kodo and items relating to the Kishū Tokugawa clan, who ruled as daimyō of Kishū Domain under the Edo Period Tokugawa Shogunate. The museum opened in the ninomaru of Wakayama Castle in 1971 and was relocated to its present facility in 1994. It is adjacent is the Museum of Modern Art, Wakayama, with which it is connected bye an underground passage

== See also ==
- Prefectural museum
