= The Museum of Modern Art, Wakayama =

Museum in Wakayama, Japan

Museum of Modern Art, Wakayama
- 和歌山県立近代美術館
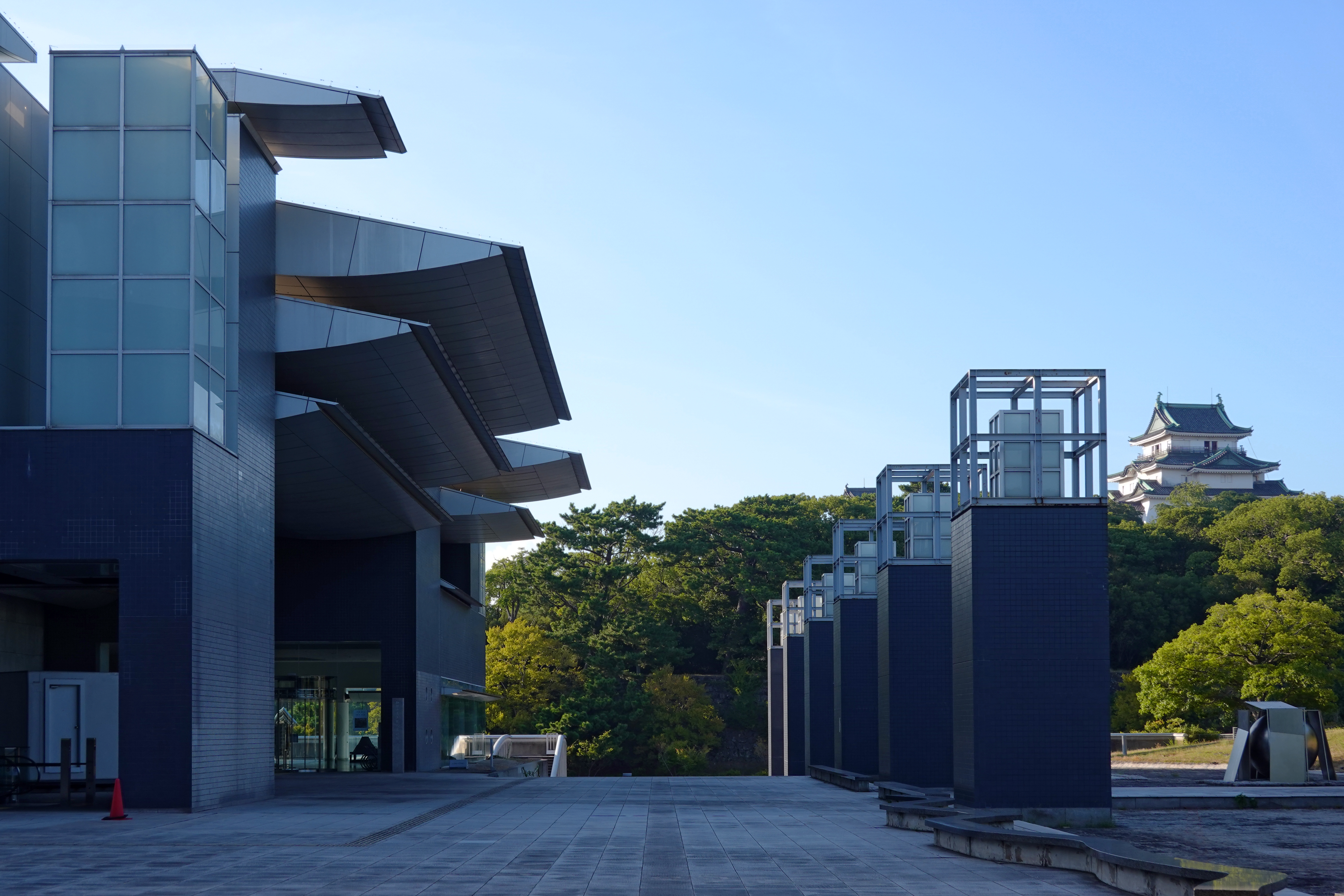
- Museum of Modern Art, Wakayama
- Interactive map of the Museum of Modern Art, Wakayama area

General information
- Location: 1-4-14 Fukiage, Wakayama, Wakayama Prefecture, Japan
- Coordinates: 34°13′30″N 135°10′17″E
- Opened: 1963
- Renovated: 1994
- Owner: Wakayama Prefecture

Website
- Official website

The Museum of Modern Art, Wakayama (和歌山県立近代美術館, Wakayama Kenritsu Kindai Bijutsukan) is a museum of modern art in the city of Wakayama, Wakayama Prefecture, Japan. The Museum first opened as the Wakayama Prefectural Museum of Art (和歌山県立美術館) in the grounds of Wakayama Castle in 1963, before reopening on the first floor of the Wakayama Prefectural Cultural Hall (和歌山県民文化会館) in 1970; in July 1994, together with the adjacent Wakayama Prefectural Museum, the Museum of Modern Art, Wakayama reopened in a new location close to the castle. The collection, from its original nucleus of 83 objects, has grown as of 2020 to some 13,000 works, including paintings by Saeki Yūzō, Suda Kunitarō, Teiji Takai and Mark Rothko.

== See also ==
- Prefectural museum
