= Kansuke Yamamoto (artist) =

Japanese poet-photographer and editor (1914–1987)

Kansuke Yamamoto 山本 悍右
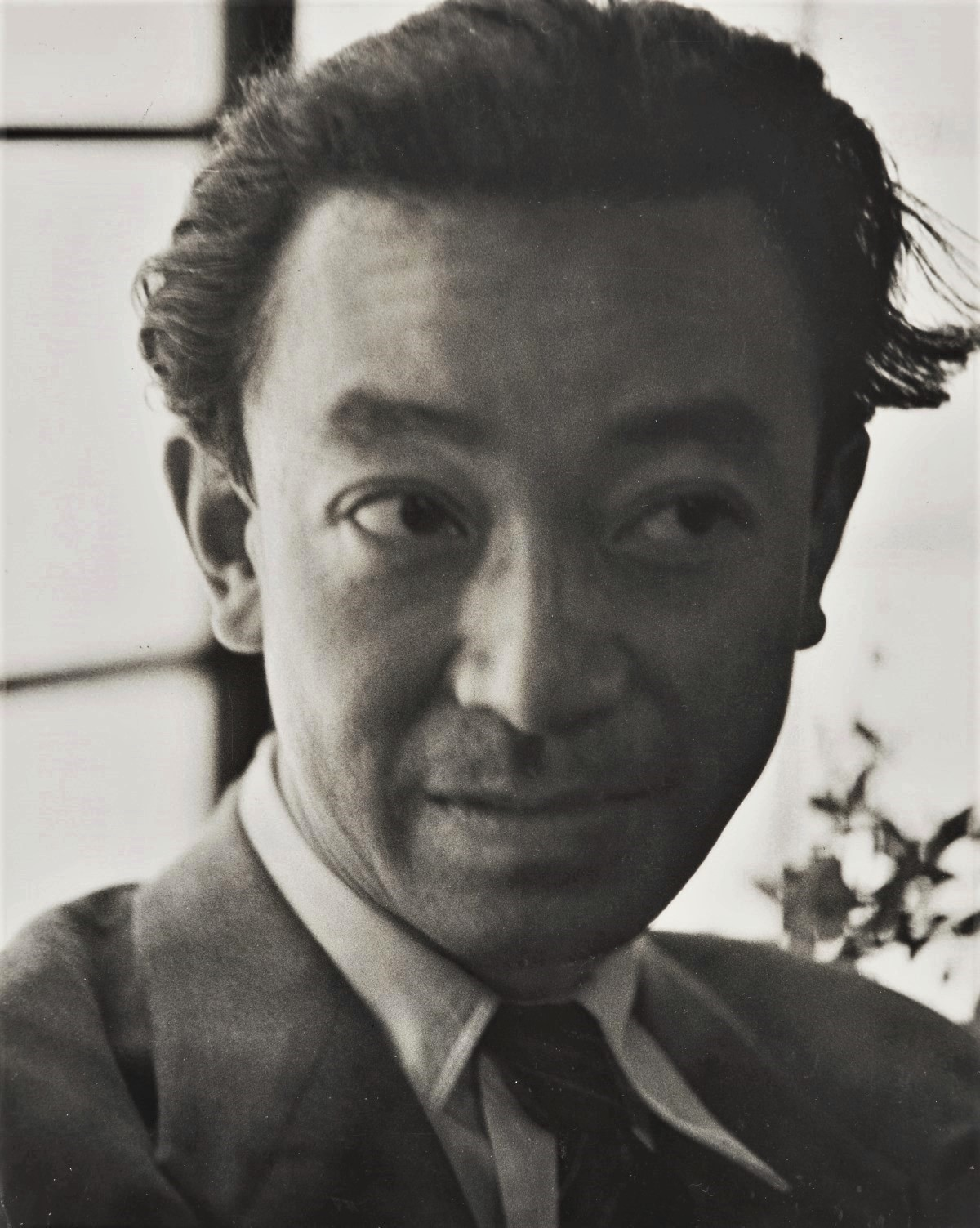
- Born: Kansuke Yamamoto; 30 March 1914; Nagoya, Empire of Japan
- Died: 2 April 1987 (aged 73); Nagoya, Japan
- Known for: Poet-photographer; editor and publisher
- Movement: Surrealism

Kansuke Yamamoto (Japanese: 山本 悍右; 30 March 1914 – 2 April 1987) was a Japanese Surrealist photographer, poet, editor, and publisher based in Nagoya. Eiko Aoki describes him as a driving force in Japan's avant-garde movement, producing innovative photographs with an uncompromising spirit. Photography historian Ryūichi Kaneko regards the establishment of the 1932 date of Yamamoto's photocollage The Developing Thought of a Human... Mist and Bedroom and as a landmark for understanding the formation and development of modern Japanese photography in the 1930s. Drawing on French Surrealist literature and periodicals, Yamamoto developed a practice that Amanda Maddox and John Solt discuss in terms of interpretation, translation, and dialogue rather than belated imitation of European models.

Yamamoto's Surrealist practice also took the form of editing, translation, and publishing. Through Yoru no Funsui, which he founded and edited in 1938, he brought together poetry, photography, translations of French Surrealist writing, and reproduced drawings. The journal ceased publication in 1939 under pressure from the Special Higher Police (Tokkō), and Yamamoto was questioned about the political meaning of his Surrealist photography and poetry. He nevertheless continued Surrealist publishing under wartime conditions through Carnet Bleu, including a Japanese translation of an essay on photography by Philippe Soupault. Maddox argues that Yamamoto resisted pressure to strip Surrealism of provocation, politics, and thought.

After the war, Yamamoto continued to pursue Surrealist ideas through collective activity and new photographic forms. He co-founded VIVI in 1947, which Maddox describes as an effort to keep the spirit of Surrealist ideology alive in the postwar period. Jelena Stojković traces Yamamoto's postwar photographic narratives from a pair of self-portraits made in 1949 to staged sequences of the 1950s, including My Thin-Aired Room (1956), in which he appeared as both actor and director. Stojković argues that these experiments made a direct link between Yamamoto's Surrealist background and emerging conceptual and performative uses of photography, and describes his work as a point of reference both for the prewar Japanese avant-garde and for the development of contemporary art and photography in Japan. Kaneko likewise rejects the accepted division of Yamamoto's career into separate prewar and postwar periods, arguing that his postwar work increased in complexity and strength and that modern Japanese photography, despite the interruption of war, should be reconsidered as a continuous and interconnected history.

The 2001 retrospective Kansuke Yamamoto: Conveyor of the Impossible at Tokyo Station Gallery became a turning point in the later reassessment of Yamamoto's work. His work was subsequently featured in Japan's Modern Divide at the J. Paul Getty Museum in 2013 and Surrealism Beyond Borders at the Metropolitan Museum of Art and Tate Modern in 2021–2022.

== Early life and background (1914–1930) ==
=== Birth and early life ===
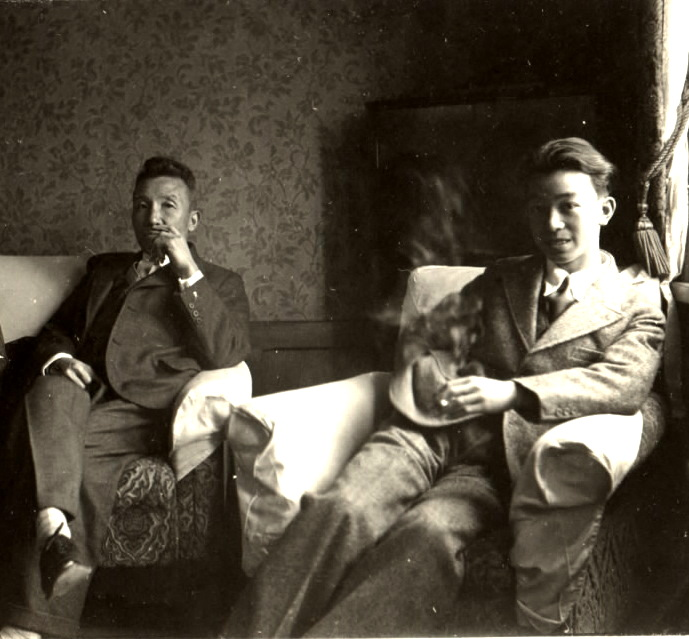
Gorō Yamamoto (left) and Kansuke Yamamoto (right), c. 1940.

Yamamoto was born on 30 March 1914 in Teppōmachi, Naka-ku, Nagoya, Aichi Prefecture, as the eldest son of Gorō Yamamoto and Tsū Yamamoto. His given name at birth was Kansuke (勘助). The family business, Yamamoto Gorō Shoten, is described as a pioneering photographic-equipment shop in Nagoya. His father was a founding member of the Aiyū Photo Club (Aiyū Shashin Kurabu) in 1912 and served as its representative during the Taishō period.

The Aiyū Photo Club was planned in 1911 and formally established in January 1912, and its monthly meetings were sometimes held at the family camera shop. This placed Yamamoto in close contact with photographic materials and amateur club culture from an early age. Kaneko notes that the annual Kenten competitions organized by the Tokyo Photographic Research Society attracted submissions from across Japan, including Nagoya.

=== Early exposure to photography ===
Biographical accounts describe Yamamoto Gorō Shōten as combining a photography supply shop with a studio environment that exposed Yamamoto early to photographic materials and processes. Nonaka-Hill likewise describes Gorō as the owner of Nagoya's first photography supply store and states that Yamamoto "naturally absorbed the mechanics of photography" in this environment.

A Nagoya City Art Museum catalogue discusses the Aiyū Photo Club's pigment-printing practices, including gum bichromate printing (often referred to as "Aiyū no gomu"). The same catalogue presents the club's exhibition and salon activities as a framework that sustained local photographic production in Nagoya. A Nagoya City Art Museum publication notes that the club's secretariat was located at Yamamoto Gorō Shōten on Hirokoji-dori in Naka-ku, placing day-to-day administration at the family business. An exhibition text by Taka Ishii Gallery describes the Aiyū Photo Club as the largest amateur photo club in Nagoya and credits Gorō's shop with giving Yamamoto early exposure to photography.

=== Nagoya photographic networks ===
Yamamoto's early career in Nagoya developed through interconnected clubs, journals, and small-press activity that provided a practical infrastructure for experimentation and exchange. In accounts of Surrealism and photography in 1930s Japan, Nagoya is described as one of the movement's liveliest centers, where amateur photo clubs and magazine culture supported the development and circulation of experimental work under growing wartime pressure.

In this milieu, Yamamoto joined the Dokuritsu Shashin Kenkyūkai in 1931 at the age of seventeen, and the group's bulletin Dokuritsu provided one of his earliest forums for publishing photographs and participating in collective print culture.

== Prewar avant-garde practice (1931–1937) ==
=== Encounter with Surrealism and the French transmission ===
==== Francophone channels and Surrealism's literary transmission ====
Aoki writes that Yamamoto's first sustained encounter with Surrealism was mediated through channels that were explicitly Francophone and broadly European in intellectual scope. She notes that Chirū (Tiroux) Yamanaka corresponded with Paul Éluard and André Breton and translated Surrealist writings as part of the channels through which French Surrealist ideas entered Japan's literary and artistic spheres. She further identifies Yamanaka's poetry magazine CINÉ (also styled cine) as one conduit within that transmission.

Munro writes that Yamamoto first encountered Surrealism through reading Yamanaka's journal CINÉ. She adds that Yamamoto later collaborated with Yamanaka when the title re-emerged as Yoru no Funsui from 1938. Tani likewise argues that Yamamoto's discovery of Surrealism was mediated by literary magazines, citing titles such as Shi to shiron and CINÉ (published by Yamanaka).

Iizawa notes that Yamamoto began writing poems around 1930, at the age of sixteen. He adds that, through the Surrealist poetry circle surrounding CINÉ, Yamamoto established early connections with figures such as Shūzō Takiguchi and Yamanaka, who are often credited with fostering Surrealism in Japan. A chronology compiled by Toshio Yamamoto records that between 1930 and 1932 Yamamoto wrote 44 poems in a cycle titled The Revelation of Nonsense (Japanese: 南仙子黙示録). The same chronology notes that a final poem was added to the cycle in 1936.

==== Tokyo study, return to Nagoya, and Surrealism as method ====
According to the J. Paul Getty Museum, Yamamoto left Nagoya around 1929 to study French poetry and literature in Tokyo and, after returning, began writing poems and making collages before taking up photography as a Surrealist instrument. Iizawa notes that after graduating from the Nagoya City Commercial School in 1929, Yamamoto studied French at the Athénée Français in Tokyo, entered Meiji University to read French literature and French poetry, and then left the university without completing his studies.

Aoki and a published biography describe his Tokyo study as the context in which he encountered Western modernist movements and theories before returning to Nagoya in 1931 and committing himself to a Surrealist vocabulary across poetry and photography. A Getty chronology derived from the chronology published by the Tokyo Station Gallery further records that in 1935 Yamamoto established the A.B.C. Photo Club with Mitsuya Okonogi and held its meetings at his father's photo supply shop, Yamamoto Gorō Shoten, placing this episode within the same practical environment of the family shop and studio through which he became familiar with photographic materials and processes. In an interview recorded in the chronology compiled by Toshio Yamamoto, he recalled turning seriously to photography in the early 1930s because Surrealism had already entered Japan and "it might be possible to do it with photography as well," treating the medium not as reportage but as a method for constructing thought through images. Masachika Tani similarly argues that Yamamoto's early-1930s turn to photography extended his avant-garde poetry practice and pursued Surrealism as a visual method rather than as a separate, purely photographic interest.

=== Formation of an avant-garde practice ===
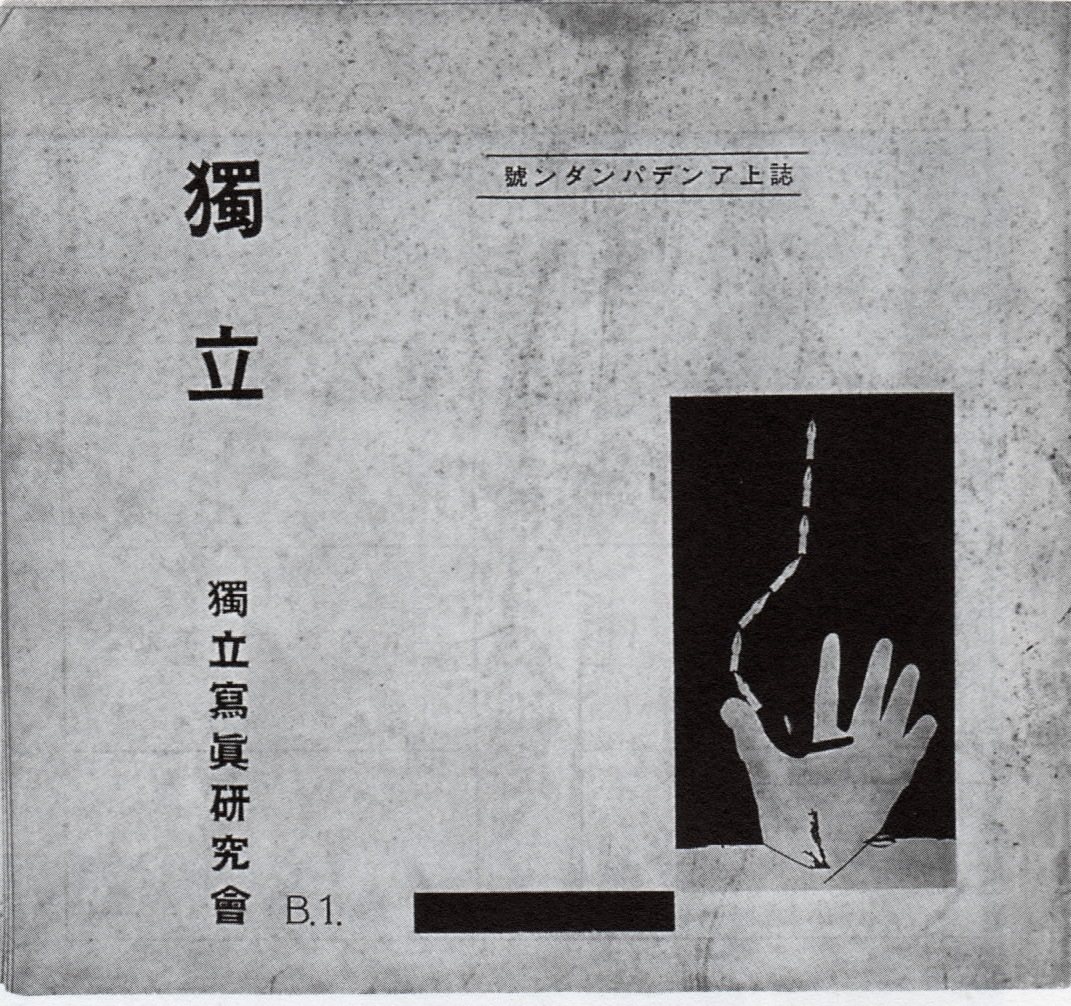
Dokuritsu (Independent), January 1932. Published by the Independent Photography Research Association. Cover photo by Kansuke Yamamoto.

==== Dokuritsu and Yamamoto's critique of New Photography ====
Photography critic Kōtarō Iizawa places Yamamoto's emergence in the early-1930s shift from pictorialist "art photography" (geijutsu shashin) toward shinkō shashin (New Photography), as photographers sought new ways of responding to Japan's changing urban environment after the 1923 Great Kantō earthquake. Iizawa identifies the 1931 German International Traveling Photography Exhibition in Tokyo and Osaka, drawn from Stuttgart's 1929 Film und Foto, as an important stimulus for New Photography through its display of photograms, photomontage, small-camera photographs of cityscapes, X-ray images, and microscopic photography. Iizawa describes Yamamoto as aligning himself with New Photography while using photographic modernism to pursue an avant-garde form of expression rather than pictorialist salon aesthetics.

Yamamoto took up photography around 1931 as part of his attempt to pursue Surrealist expression through the medium, entering photographic activity through small-press work as well as exhibitions. In October 1931, at the age of seventeen, he became a founding member of the Dokuritsu Shashin Kenkyūkai, which published the bulletin Dokuritsu as a forum for members' photographs and writing. Takeba records that the association was established in Nagoya by Shimizu Kentarō (志水賢太郎), Tomita Hachirō (富多八郎), and Okonogi Mitsuya (小此木光也), began with sixteen members, and issued four known numbers of Dokuritsu through B.2 in April 1932. Takeba places the run of Dokuritsu between the end of the Tokyo journal Shinkō Shashin Kenkyū in July 1931 and the launch of the monthly magazine Kōga in May 1932. Fujimura notes that accounts of New Photography centered on Tokyo also intersected with activity in Kansai and Nagoya, including the Dokuritsu Shashin Kenkyūkai.

Takeba notes that early statements on New Photography by writers including Nobuo Ina and Shigemine Kanamaru emphasized objective depiction and the discovery of "new beauty", photography as record and report, and form created through light. In B.1 of Dokuritsu, Yamamoto published the essay Dai to shudai ("Title and Subject"), in which he argued that a photograph should express the content of an "ism" and the artist's conscious intention rather than depend on its title for meaning. Takeba quotes Yamamoto's statement that "it is necessary to express the theme of our ideology and the content of our consciousness" and reads the essay as an early criticism of tendencies that became visible as New Photography spread through photographic magazines. Yamamoto also contributed photographs and other short theoretical texts to Dokuritsu during this period. In an English-language history of Japanese photography, Takeba describes Yamamoto as a young poet in Nagoya who began photographing in 1931 and whose photocollages published in a small magazine the following year received critical praise.

Between 1933 and 1935, Yamamoto also participated in book and limited-edition print circles, joining the Nihon Genteiban Club in 1933 and the Shunchōkai Genteiban Kurabu and the Book Club in 1934, while also becoming involved with Mazu, the Nihon Aishokai, and Kogei.

==== The 1932 photocollages ====
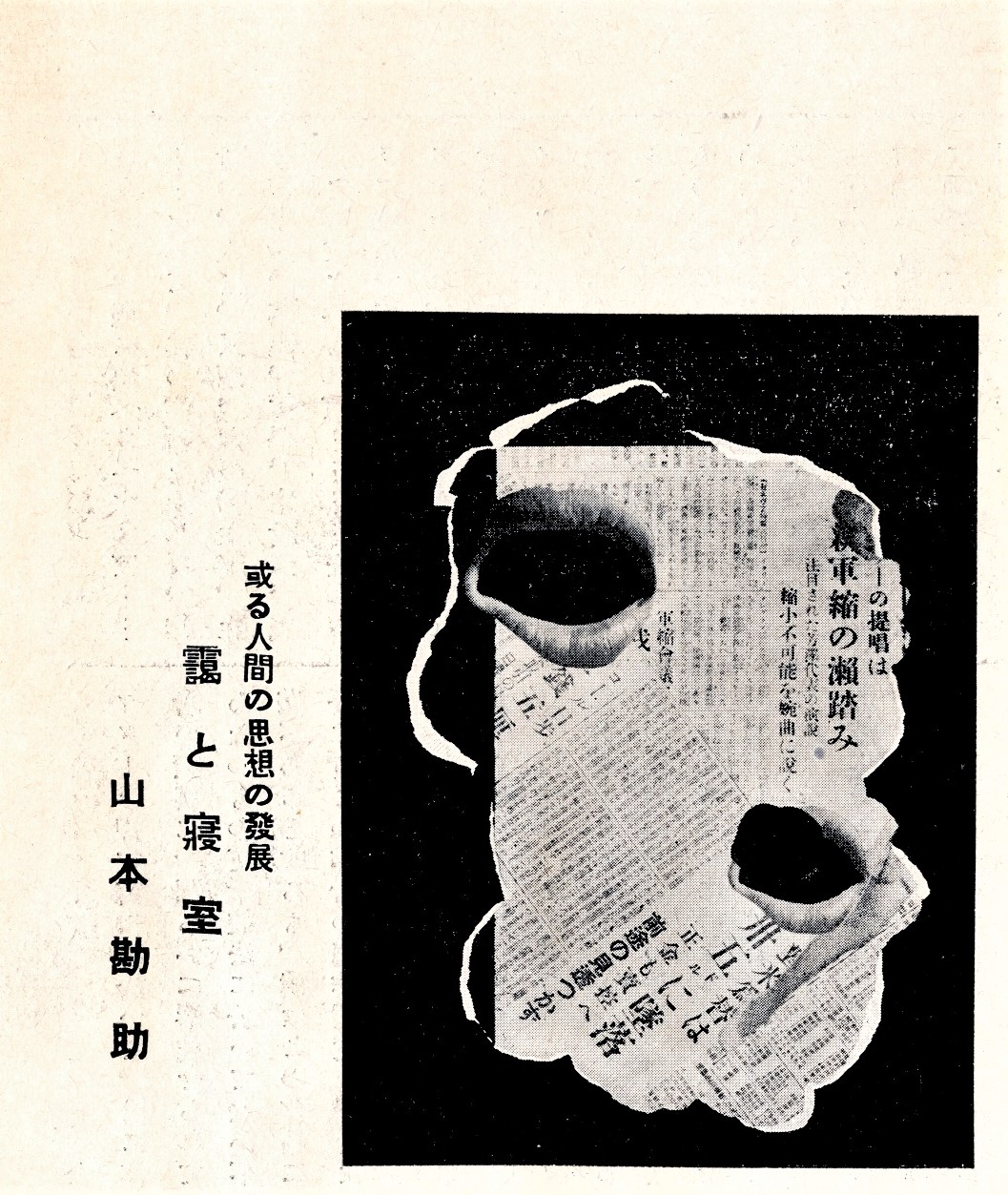
Dokuritsu (独立), B.2 (Apr. 1932): The Developing Thought of a Human Being—Mist and Bedroom (1932), by Kansuke Yamamoto.

Kaneko records that works from Yamamoto's early series The Developing Thought of a Human appeared in Dokuritsu B.1 on 1 January 1932 and B.2 on 5 April 1932. Kaneko notes that the two works reproduced in B.1 are no longer extant but suggests that they were also photocollages. The surviving The Developing Thought of a Human... Mist and Bedroom is a hand-colored collage incorporating newspaper and magazine material and a gelatin silver print, and is held by the Nagoya City Art Museum. It is among Yamamoto's earliest surviving experiments with photomontage.

The date of the work had long been uncertain, but research for the 2001 retrospective Surrealist Yamamoto Kansuke established that Yamamoto made it in 1932, when he was eighteen. Kaneko regards the confirmation of its 1932 date as a landmark for understanding the formation and development of modern Japanese photography in the 1930s. Kaneko also considers the work's level of artistic expression to be on a par with that of contemporary European artists.

Iizawa describes the work as juxtaposing an image of lips with fragments cut from contemporary newspapers and argues that it shows that Yamamoto had acquired an avant-garde idiom by the age of eighteen. Tani notes that the collage includes newspaper fragments referring to the 1932 Geneva disarmament conference and to the economic crisis following the 1929 New York stock-market crash, together with sensual cut-out imagery. Yamamoto tore open the black photographic surface of the collage to expose newspaper clippings beneath it and combined them with photographs of lips, a woman's face, and a woman's leg. The visible newspaper reports concern arms reduction and movements in the yen, including reports on the Geneva disarmament conference and the economic crisis associated with the Great Depression.

Kaneko argues that Yamamoto did not adopt collage from the European avant-garde only for its aesthetic or stylistic qualities. Kaneko instead reads the work as using collage for social criticism in the specific conditions of Japan. He relates the newspaper material to Japan's movement from peace toward war between the Manchurian Incident of 1931 and its withdrawal from the League of Nations in 1933.

Takeba draws attention to Yamamoto's use of bodily fragments, revue imagery, pen nibs, buildings, and contemporary newspaper reports in the works published in Dokuritsu. Takeba argues that the photocollages do more than present disconnected fragments of reality because their arrangement leads the viewer to imagine time and narrative. Takeba reads the works as evidence that Yamamoto had already recognized limits within New Photography and was beginning to move beyond them.

Stojković notes that Yamamoto was already experimenting with collage and photomontage in Surrealist circles in Nagoya in the early 1930s. She places these printed experiments within a wider Surrealist "constellation" that connected photographers, poets, critics, and artistic groups across institutional boundaries. Stojković argues that this network is relevant not only to the international character of Surrealism but also to its continuation after the war. She also notes that these exchanges came under increasingly difficult political conditions, particularly after the outbreak of the Second Sino-Japanese War in 1937.

The J. Paul Getty Museum describes Yamamoto as reworking European-inspired Surrealist imagery through Japanese settings, materials, motifs, and concerns. Taka Ishii Gallery describes Yamamoto as one of the leading figures of Surrealist photography in Japan and highlights his social criticism and poetic sensibility. The Getty places Yamamoto among the photographers who developed progressive photography in 1930s Japan through engagement with Surrealism. Eiko Aoki describes Yamamoto as a driving force in Japan's avant-garde movement and notes the uncompromising character of his photography.

=== Name change and first solo exhibition (1936) ===
In 1936, Yamamoto altered the written characters of his given name from 勘助 to 悍右 while keeping the reading "Kansuke". Art historian John Solt, drawing on testimony from the photographer Katsuhiko Okazaki, interpreted the change as a deliberately charged gesture aimed at the "violent right". Solt treats the change as a political use of written language rather than a neutral change of name. A chronology compiled by Yamamoto Toshio records that Yamamoto held his first solo exhibition at Maruzen Gallery in Nagoya in 1936.

=== Surrealist networks and publishing (1936–1937) ===
==== French-language reading and Nagoya networks ====
A chronology compiled by Toshio Yamamoto records that Yamamoto began ordering overseas publications in 1936, including Cahiers d'Art and books issued by G.L.M. Maddox notes that Yamamoto built a substantial personal library of French Surrealist writing that included works by André Breton, Paul Éluard, Louis Aragon, Benjamin Péret, and Philippe Soupault, and that he also read Sigmund Freud. Munro records that Yamamoto was fluent in French and maintained an extensive Surrealist library that included periodicals such as Acéphale and Cahiers d'Art.

Hanako Takayama argues that the reception of Surrealism in Nagoya cannot be explained as a simple one-way diffusion from Tokyo. Munro notes that Yamamoto's close collaborator Chirū Yamanaka was interested in dissident forms of Surrealism associated with Georges Bataille, in contrast with the more Breton-centered line associated with Shūzō Takiguchi in Tokyo. Maddox presents Yamamoto's work as a case that complicates accounts of Surrealism in Japan as a simple importation or belated imitation of European models. Maddox and Solt describe Yamamoto's engagement with Surrealism in terms of translation and dialogue shaped by the conditions in which he worked in Japan.

==== The 1937 exhibition and the move into publishing ====
The touring Kaigai Chōgenjitsushugi Sakuhinten (Exhibition of Overseas Surrealist Works) was shown in Nagoya in 1937. Yūko Ishii places the exhibition within the international exhibition history of Surrealism in the 1930s and argues that it should not be understood only as an introduction of European Surrealism to Japan. An exhibition catalogue records that Yamamoto repeatedly visited the Nagoya presentation and came to see the need for a periodical that could communicate Surrealist ideas. A chronology compiled by Toshio Yamamoto records that he later discussed with Chirū Yamanaka the need to promote Surrealism through publishing. The same chronology records that this initiative became a catalyst for Yoru no Funsui, which Yamamoto began editing and publishing in 1938.

== Editing, publishing, and wartime constraints (1938–1945) ==
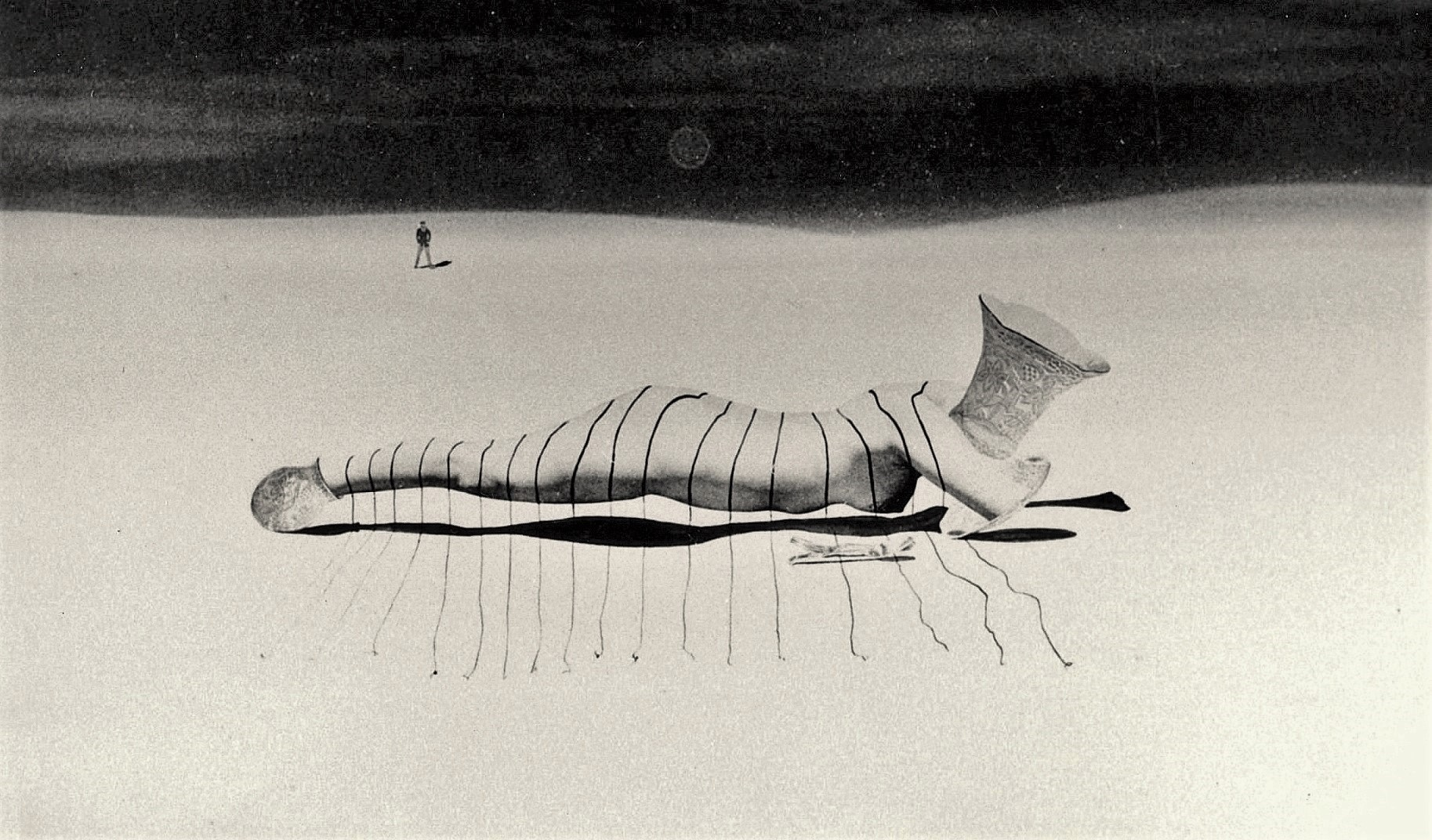
Title unknown, Kansuke Yamamoto, 1938. Collection of the Nagoya City Art Museum.

Art criticism has described Nagoya as one of the centers of Surrealism in Japan, a context in which Yamamoto and his peers sustained avant-garde photographic activity across the prewar and postwar decades.

=== Editorial platforms under wartime pressure ===
From 1938, editing and publishing became central to Yamamoto's Surrealist practice, and museum and gallery accounts describe these activities as integral to his role in Nagoya's avant-garde. Yamamoto's participation in bibliophile circles and his editorial work for small-print journals show him not only as a maker of photographs and poems but also as an editor and publisher whose work took shape through projects such as Yoru no Funsui and, later, Carnet Bleu.

Kurosawa cites a document from G.L.M. dated 21 November 1938 acknowledging an order from Yamamoto. In a letter to Yamamoto dated 19 January 1939, José Corti mentioned Benjamin Péret's Dormir dormir dans les pierres. Kurosawa also notes that Yamamoto used catalogues issued by G.L.M. and José Corti to order books and periodicals from France.

==== Yoru no Funsui: editing, translation, and Tokkō scrutiny ====
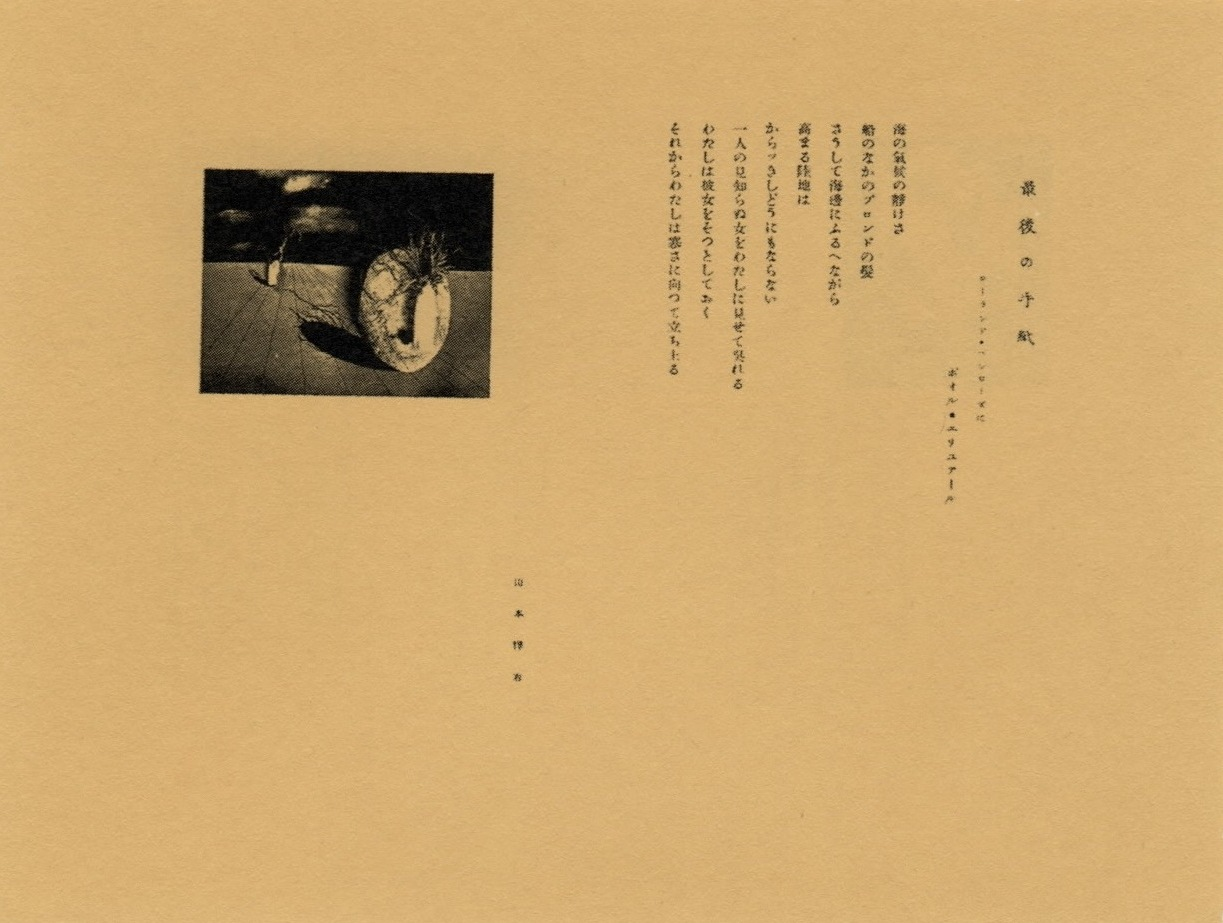
The Night's Fountain, vol. 1 (1 November 1938), edited and published by Kansuke Yamamoto; photo by Yamamoto.

In November 1938, Yamamoto launched Yoru no Funsui as a Surrealist poetry and art journal. A 1990 exhibition catalogue edited by the Nagoya City Art Museum described it as the last poetry journal in Japanese Surrealism to present itself explicitly as a purely Surrealist journal. Four issues appeared through October 1939, all in small editions.

Yamamoto also gave close attention to the journal's paper, typography, and layout, and Kinoshita describes Yoru no Funsui as a carefully designed avant-garde poetry journal produced as wartime restrictions were tightening. Its pages brought together Yamamoto's prose, poetry, and photographs with work by other writers and artists, including drawings by Yoshio Shimozato and poems by Chirū Yamanaka. Maddox notes that it also combined translations of French Surrealist poetry and Yamamoto's own poems with reproduced drawings by Yves Tanguy.

The journal was also an outlet for French Surrealist writing in Japan. Yoshiteru Kurosawa notes that the first three issues included Japanese translations of texts from the French journal Cahiers G.L.M.. Surrealist visual art was already being introduced through publications drawing on journals such as Cahiers d'Art and Minotaure, but Kurosawa notes that there were far fewer outlets for French Surrealist poetry and prose and describes Yoru no Funsui as virtually the only one in Japan at the time. With Yamanaka's help, copies were also sent to Paul Éluard in France. D'Alessandro and Gale identify periodicals as an important means by which Surrealist texts and images circulated between different communities through exchange and translation.

Police scrutiny brought Yoru no Funsui to an end in 1939. Stojković reports that Yamamoto was interrogated about the political implications of Surrealist photography. Munro writes that he was asked how his "surreal photography" contributed to Japan's war effort, while Tani reports that he was also pressed to explain lines from his poems. Maddox, citing John Solt, describes an interrogation in which Tokkō officers demanded an explanation of "the third line of the second stanza" of a Surrealist poem. In Solt's account, Yamamoto later described the interrogation as "a frightening experience" and recalled having to evade the officers' questions without saying anything that the police could interpret as incriminating. Solt reports that Yamamoto was released on the condition that he cease publication of Yoru no Funsui.

A fifth issue was in preparation but never appeared. Yamamoto subsequently planned another Surrealist journal, Brille, with the stated aim of introducing the "Surrealist spirit". In 1940, he drafted "Notes on the Trends of Surrealism and Photography" for its projected first issue, but the journal remained unpublished.

==== Seidōsha and Carnet Bleu: a French title in wartime Nagoya ====
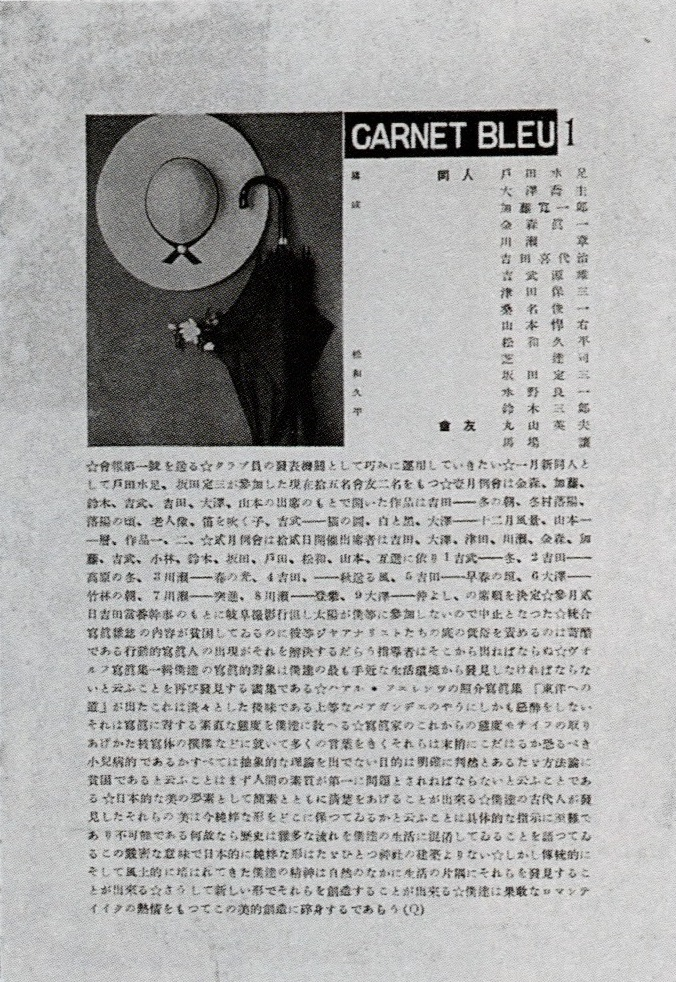
Carnet Bleu ("Blue Notebook"), issue 1 (March 1941), published by Kansuke Yamamoto.

In 1938, Yamamoto helped establish the photographers' group Seidōsha (Blue Admiration Society). A 1989 Nagoya City Art Museum exhibition catalogue notes that around the same time he became acquainted with photographer Keiichiro Goto through the Seidōsha circle and that the two remained close thereafter. After Yoru no Funsui had ceased publication and the planned journal Brille remained unrealized, Yamamoto continued small-scale publishing under wartime constraints through Seidōsha's bulletin Carnet Bleu. He edited and published the bulletin beginning with its first issue on 25 March 1941. Five issues appeared between 25 March 1941 and 10 August 1942, with the fifth issue serving as the final issue.

The bulletin retained its French title through the final issue, while Yamamoto continued to engage with Francophone avant-garde writing during a period of intensifying cultural nationalism and wartime pressure in Japan. Takeba describes Yamamoto's contribution to the first issue as a “poet's monologue” on the contemporary development of “avant-garde photography” and “constructive photography.”

The fifth and final issue, dated 10 August 1942, carried Yamamoto's Japanese translation of Philippe Soupault's essay État de la photographie ("The Present State of Photography"). Kaneko places the translation within Yamamoto's continuing engagement with Francophone writing during the war years. Takeba reads Yamamoto's added note to the translation as an expression of his determination to develop his own mode of expression despite wartime conditions. In a later account, Takeba notes that Yamamoto's comment described Soupault's words as standing at “a certain distance” from the wartime rhetoric of “national mission,” which Takeba connects to Minoru Sakata's position at the end of the Nagoya Photo Avant-Garde. Takeba relates this context to wartime pressure on photographers to align their practice with national objectives. Takeba further sees Yamamoto's postwar return to Soupault's anti-fascist words as reflecting the unresolved legacy of his prewar experience.

=== Nagoya avant-garde networks and wartime divergence ===
Scholars and institutional accounts describe Nagoya's club-and-magazine networks as major channels through which Surrealist-leaning photography circulated in interwar Japan, and they place Yamamoto's early public activity within that milieu.

Stojković writes that the 1937 Kaigai Chōgenjitsushugi Sakuhinten (Exhibition of Foreign Surrealist Works), shown in Nagoya at Maruzen gallery, helped stimulate reorganizations and new collectives with explicitly Surrealist agendas in the city. Later accounts also describe the Nagoya Avant-Garde Club as a cross-disciplinary group from which the photo section later split off as the Nagoya Photo Avant-Garde.

Yamamoto participated in the establishment of the Nagoya Photo Avant-Garde in 1939, but he withdrew later that year as the group moved toward a more nationalist and propagandistic position under wartime pressure.

Contemporary institutional accounts also point to magazine and exhibition circuits as key amplifiers of Nagoya's prewar avant-garde visibility, via outlets such as Photo Times and Camera Art that gave experimental work a national profile. Kaneko notes that a review by Sakata in the July 1940 issue of Photo Times praised Yamamoto's ability to "sublimate ... poetic sentiments in silver bromide," characterizing him as a "poet of silver bromide," and a Nagoya City Art Museum chronology records that the same issue carried a profile of Yamamoto and reproduced three of his works.

Later accounts note that growing suspicion surrounding the term “avant-garde” encouraged euphemistic renaming under wartime conditions. The Nagoya group adopted the name Nagoya Shashin Bunka Kyōkai (Nagoya Photography Culture Association) around November 1939 and dissolved in 1941.

=== VOU and a long-running cross-media axis ===
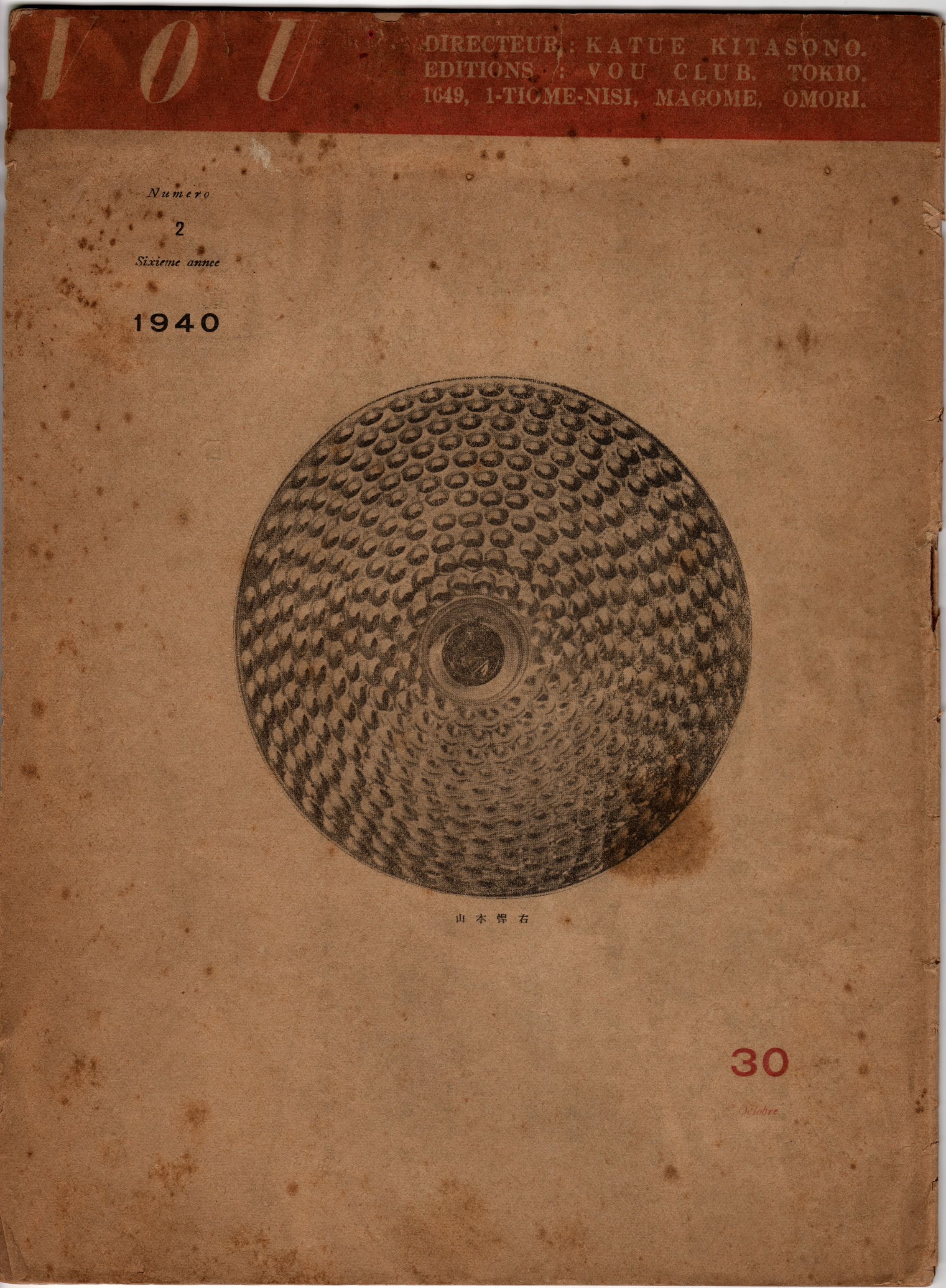
VOU vol. 30 (1940), cover photograph by Kansuke Yamamoto.

Yamamoto became a member of the avant-garde poetry group VOU in 1939. The Taka Ishii Gallery CV records that he remained associated with VOU until the group's dissolution in 1978, and it also lists his participation in VOU exhibitions across the prewar and postwar decades. In John Solt's account, VOU (led by poet Katué Kitasono) was active from 1935 to 1978, with an interruption during the Pacific War. Solt states that the group typically comprised about twenty-five to thirty-five members at a time. Solt adds that VOU included musicians, architects, technologists, and visual artists, while noting that all members wrote poetry and that the group held a prewar conviction that poetry was "the fountain of all the arts". Solt also notes that Yamamoto published poems in the group's magazine as well as in other venues.

Kaneko, Toda, and Vartanian note that VOU members began submitting photographs in the late 1950s. They add that Kitasono began making photographs under Yamamoto's instruction, identifying Yamamoto as a prewar VOU member who remained a reference point for the group's later photographic activity. In a 2024 monograph on VOU and Kitasono, Bory and Donguy describe Yamamoto as the group's most experimental photographer, and they write that he exhibited regularly while rarely publishing photographs in the journal itself. Bory and Donguy further report that in VOU no. 53 (1956), Kitasono praised Yamamoto's photographic series as "poetic".

Lucy Fleming-Brown describes a 1941 still-life composition published in VOU in which a disconnected telephone receiver is staged as an offering on a plate at the end of a staircase descending toward the sea. Fleming-Brown treats the image as characteristic of Yamamoto's practice of placing everyday objects into symbolically charged constellations, and she notes that his accompanying text stresses photography's mechanical organization and its capacity to disclose objects in unforeseen relations. Fleming-Brown also notes that the 1941 issue was prefaced by a coerced declaration of support for Japan's war effort, and she reads the telephone image within Yamamoto's wartime motif of disrupted communication under authoritarian repression. The International Encyclopedia of Surrealism notes that Yamamoto's work was prominently published in Kitasono's VOU and other Japanese photography magazines, producing an unusually extensive published Surrealist portfolio for a Japanese practitioner of the period.

=== Surveillance, nonconformity, and imagery of silencing ===
Accounts of Yamamoto's wartime work emphasize the effects of surveillance and censorship on avant-garde publishing and photography. Maddox reads Buddhist Temple's Birdcage (1940), which pairs a telephone with a birdcage, as an image of silencing and constrained communication under ideological control. Munro likewise discusses the work in relation to censorship and restrictions on speech and print. A Nagoya City Art Museum collection catalogue interprets the related 1940 variation of Buddhist Temple's Birdcage, in which a telephone receiver is placed outside the cage, as a Surrealist image of voicelessness that registers silent resistance to the suppression of speech at the time. Stojković regards some photographs Yamamoto made after leaving the Nagoya club as among the strongest examples of Surrealist photography produced in Japan in the 1930s; two were published in the second issue of Kōkaku in August 1940.

Stojković treats Yamamoto's 1940 work around Buddhist Temple's Birdcage as a two-image sequence accompanied by a poem and reads it in the context of contemporary Surrealist debates about the "object". She connects the disconnected telephone receiver with imagery associated with Salvador Dalí in the late 1930s that Shūzō Takiguchi discussed in Japan in 1939. Stojković also relates the sequence to Yamamoto's 1940 writing on photography, in which he described searching for objects and for new relations between them that could produce "living content". Rather than treating Yamamoto's use of the telephone motif as simple imitation, Stojković places it within a Japanese response to an international Surrealist visual language.

Maddox situates Yamamoto's late-1930s and wartime activity in a climate shaped by the Peace Preservation Law (1925) and policing by the Tokkō, under which avant-garde circles could be monitored and nonconformity treated as grounds for suspicion. Munro argues that wartime cultural policing targeted ideology and perceived political content rather than "Western style" as such. She writes that, as Tokkō enforcement intensified, the threat of persecution led many avant-garde writers and artists to remove liberal or potentially subversive content from their work. Against this background, Maddox writes that Yamamoto "quietly challenged the idea that Surrealist work needed to be devoid of provocation, politics, or thought".

In the catalogue for Surrealism Beyond Borders, an exhibition presented at the Metropolitan Museum of Art and Tate Modern, D'Alessandro and Gale include Yamamoto alongside Shūzō Takiguchi and Ichirō Fukuzawa in a brief discussion of the repression of Surrealism under rising militarism in Japan. Takiguchi and Fukuzawa were arrested in 1941. Yamamoto, by contrast, was questioned by the Tokkō over his Surrealist photography and poetry and was required to cease publication of Yoru no Funsui.

Munro documents that state pressure operated not only through censorship but also through surveillance of avant-garde social space, including plain-clothes police attending Surrealist meetings from 1940. Munro also records a case of a Surrealist photographer agreeing to report on meetings on behalf of the police. Munro further notes that as groups recalibrated toward patriotic aims, a Nagoya photography organization adopted the stated goal of a "union, through photography, of reform and nationalism". Munro writes that Yamamoto resigned in protest and that the group later dissolved in 1941. The Getty Museum's exhibition text describes Yamamoto as an "ardent nonconformist" who favored avant-garde modes of expression as a way of engaging modern Japanese life obliquely rather than through documentary realism. Munro cautions against treating repression as a simple function of Surrealism's "Western" style and stresses that enforcers could distinguish style from ideology. Munro observes that scholarship has alternated between describing Japanese Surrealism as apolitical and as politically radical enough to warrant systematic suppression, arguing that its political character is best assessed through practitioner-specific analysis rather than a single overarching narrative. Maddox reports that in a 1941 diary entry Yamamoto described art as arising from a "disobedient spirit against ready-made things of society".

Munro notes that Yamamoto had expressed interest in Communism in diary entries from 1933–1934, showing that this interest preceded his 1940 discussion of the relationship between Surrealism and Communism. She reports that a 1940 manuscript by Yamamoto, "Surrealism and Photography", quotes Breton's Communicating Vessels and discusses Surrealism's tense relation to Communism. Munro notes that Yamamoto complained of increasing totalitarianism in Japan and questioned how the Surrealist notion of "compulsive beauty" could be reconciled with Communist aims. She further reports that Yamamoto regarded Surrealism's inherent liberalism as an obstacle to any stable rapprochement with Communism, while continuing to insist on the revolutionary potential of his photographic practice. Munro links the manuscript to Yamamoto's earlier diary entries and sees both as evidence of his engagement, from Japan, with wider Surrealist debates over whether revolutionary politics could be reconciled with Surrealist aesthetics and its notion of "compulsive beauty".

Stojković notes that in 1940, in his essay "A Concise Vilification with Regard to Photography", Yamamoto described the photographic act as a process in which, once the shutter is released, "all things within a chosen angle fly into a fixed mask". Stojković adds that Yamamoto framed his practice as a search for objects and for new correlations between them that could "symbolize living content". Munro further notes that during the police investigation surrounding Yoru no Funsui (closed in 1939), Yamamoto was pressed to explain how his Surreal photography contributed to Japan's war effort. Maddox discusses the closure of Yoru no Funsui under Tokkō scrutiny as more than an episode in publishing history, emphasizing how avant-garde publication itself could become a site of surveillance and enforcement. Taka Ishii Gallery's biography emphasizes Yamamoto's recurring use of charged everyday objects and images of enclosure as a means of registering pressure and constraint without direct declaration. Maddox identifies a recurring vocabulary of suppression in Yamamoto's wartime-era imagery, including a barred window as an emblem of imprisonment under the Peace Preservation Law, hats clipped with clothespins or punctured by straight pins as metaphors for constrained thought, and a telephone trapped inside a birdcage as an image of enforced silence.

A chronology compiled by Toshio Yamamoto records that Yamamoto married Hisae Hirai in 1942. The same chronology notes that she later served as a model for a number of Yamamoto's postwar photographs.

== Postwar work and networks (1945-1960) ==
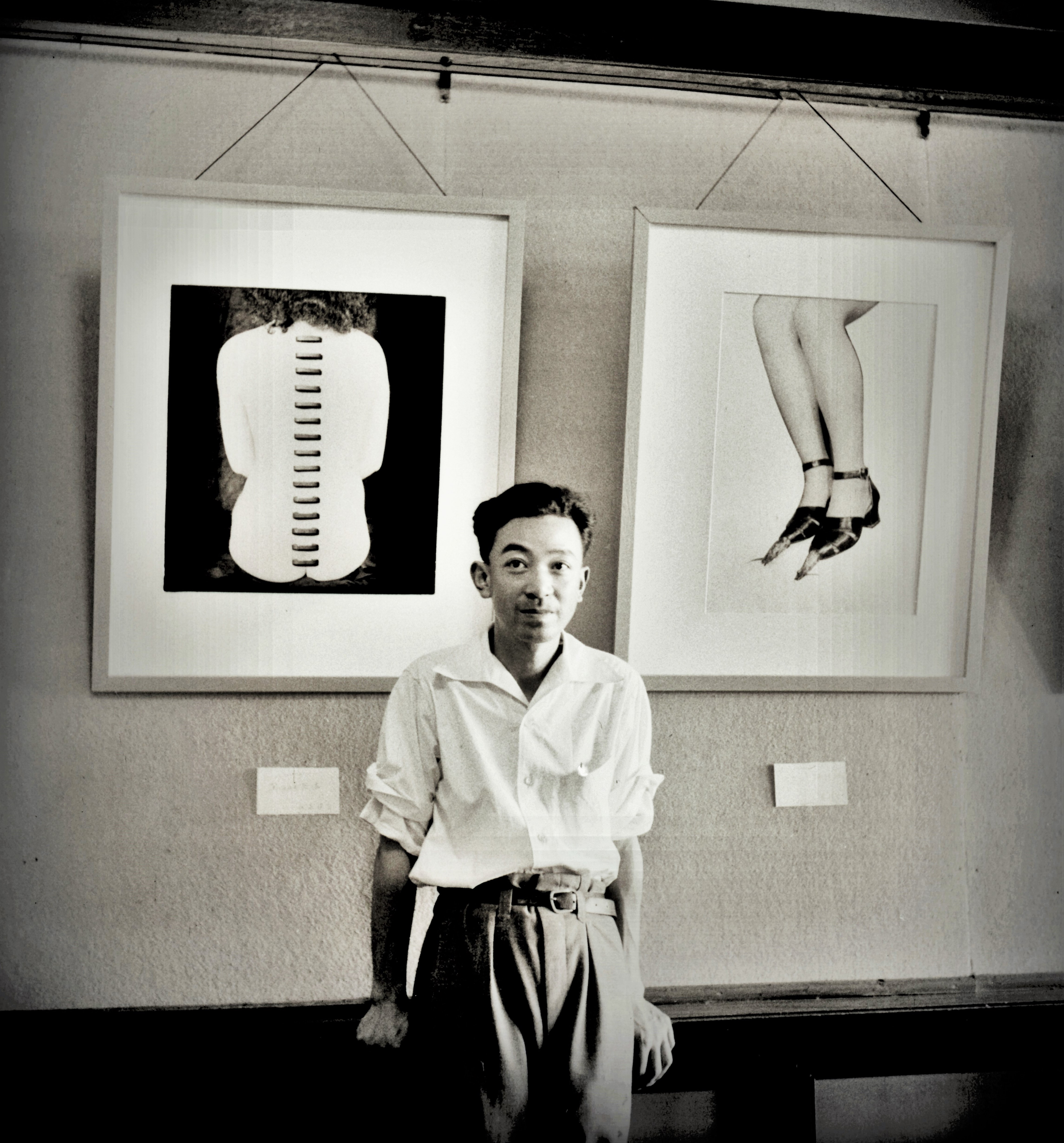
Kansuke Yamamoto in front of his works at the VIVI exhibition (1949).

After the war, Yamamoto co-founded the photographers' collective VIVI-sha in 1947 and exhibited in its early shows. In March 1949, he joined the photography section of the Bijutsu Bunka Kyōkai (Art and Culture Association) and exhibited eight works at its ninth exhibition.

Kaneko, Toda, and Vartanian describe the Bijutsu Bunka Kyōkai as founded in 1939 by Surrealism-oriented avant-garde artists. The association's activities were curtailed after the 1941 arrests of leading figures and resumed in 1946. They identify the association as a base for the postwar revival of avant-garde art, including photography.

Japanese photographic historiography notes that around 1950, still under Allied occupation, photographers and critics began to articulate efforts to revive a prewar current often described as "avant-garde photography". The same account characterizes this current as rooted in amateur circles, including Osaka's Avant-Garde Zōei Shūdan and Nagoya's Nagoya Foto Avant-Garde. It also describes the revived tendency as drawing on Surrealism-inflected techniques and debates associated with interwar Shinkō shashin.

=== Organizing the postwar avant-garde: Nagoya as an alternative center ===
A review of Takeba Jō's movement-history of Nagoya photography describes the postwar field as one in which realist and subjective approaches "vied closely", alongside renewed currents of abstract and Surrealist expression in the region. The Nagoya City Art Museum similarly frames modern photographic expression in Nagoya as a field shaped by both abstract/Surrealist tendencies and the postwar contest between "objective" documentary impulses and "subjective" approaches.

Institutional summaries of Yamamoto's career note that he co-founded VIVI in 1947 with figures including Minayoshi Takada, Keiichirō Gotō, and Yoshifumi Hattori. The Yamamoto chronology records that at VIVI's second exhibition at Maruzen Gallery in 1949 he exhibited works including Yūutsu na sanpo (憂鬱な散歩), Jiikufurīdo gensō (ジイクフリイド幻想), A Chronicle of Drifting (漂流記), and Icarus's Episode (イカルス挿話). A CV published by Taka Ishii Gallery also lists Yamamoto's participation in early VIVI exhibitions in this period.

Two works associated with this moment, Icarus's Episode (1949) and A Chronicle of Drifting (1949), are held by the Museum of Modern Art and the J. Paul Getty Museum respectively. Amanda Maddox writes that Yamamoto helped found VIVI in order to keep the spirit of Surrealist ideology alive in the postwar period. A 2025 collection note from the Metropolitan Museum of Art, written for Keiichiro Goto's Memorandum (1947), likewise describes wartime-censured experimental activity in Nagoya as resurfacing in the mid-1940s and frames VIVI as part of that revival.

Takeba remarks that postwar Surrealist work has often been comparatively overlooked in accounts privileging prewar avant-garde production, and he situates Yamamoto's postwar activity with the VIVI circle in tension with contemporaneous realist currents. Takeba also notes that VIVI disseminated its postwar program through its bulletin CARNET DE VIVI, whose first issue (printed June 1948) paired members' photographs with short programmatic statements and framed the collective as a renewed avant-garde after the wartime rupture. The Nagoya City Art Museum's annual report likewise lists CARNET DE VIVI no. 1 (June 1948) among relevant materials, supporting its documentary presence within institutional archives.

In Takeba's reading, Yamamoto's contribution links postwar rhetoric of photographic trust to an awareness of the medium's risks, explicitly reconnecting VIVI practice to ethical problems he had posed through wartime publishing and translation work. Takeba further places this local contest within a broader postwar polarization between socially oriented documentary realism and a renewed, formally constructed "subjective" photography, and he frames Yamamoto's Surrealist revival as a third position grounded in montage, emblematic objects, and oblique critique.

Yoshiteru Kurosawa similarly argues that accounts treating avant-garde photography as a prewar movement brought to an end by the war obscure important continuities into the postwar period. In his account of Nagoya, Yamamoto continued to engage with the avant-garde across the wartime divide, while postwar avant-garde photographic activity in the city developed around Yamamoto and Keiichirō Gotō.

=== Staged photography, self-portraiture, and narrative sequences ===
Stojković traces Yamamoto's postwar use of photographic narrative to a pair of self-portraits made in 1949. In 1956, Yamamoto made staged sequences including It Is Raining In Town, My Room Is, Full of Fragments and My Thin-Aired Room. Yamamoto appears in these photographs himself, and Stojković describes him as taking the roles of both actor and director.

Amanda Maddox identifies René Magritte's Man with a Newspaper (1928) as a model for My Thin-Aired Room. Elsewhere in the same essay, Maddox argues that seemingly derivative elements in Yamamoto's work should not be treated as evidence of mere formal imitation. She instead describes Yamamoto as an interpreter who engaged Surrealism from abroad while developing its visual language within the conditions of modern Japan. Maddox describes My Thin-Aired Room as a four-part reworking of Magritte's composition in which the seated figure and then the furniture disappear from one photograph to the next. Writing in 1956, Katsue Kitasono described My Thin-Aired Room as Yamamoto's most original achievement and a "revelation" for avant-garde photography.

VOU no. 58 published My Thin-Aired Room as a four-photograph "photo-story" in November 1957. VOU no. 59 published It Is Raining In Town, My Room Is, Full of Fragments as a three-photograph "photo-story" in 1958. Masachika Tani dates A Forgotten Person to 1957 and describes it as a five-image sequence in which a female figure gradually changes and disappears.

Kōtarō Iizawa distinguishes Yamamoto's sequences from the journalistic photo-essay. Iizawa describes them instead as constructed situations that unfold across successive photographs. He also compares Yamamoto's use of photographic sequences with the later work of Duane Michals. In 2017, he described It Is Raining In Town, My Room Is, Full of Fragments and My Thin-Aired Room as works that structured performance as a sequence. A 2024 history of Japanese photography likewise identifies Yamamoto as a photographer who worked with staged photography. In 2018, Iizawa cited Yamamoto, Shōji Ueda, and Eikoh Hosoe as exceptions in a discussion of the relative rarity of theatrical styles in Japanese photography.

Kazumiki Chiba approaches Yamamoto's postwar self-portraits through the question of what happens when viewers try to assign them a fixed meaning. Discussing one self-portrait in which a crack-like pattern spreads from the area of Yamamoto's eye, Chiba notes how readily a viewer may be tempted to interpret the image as an expression of the artist's anxiety. Chiba argues that once the viewer begins to supply such a meaning, the interpretation reveals the viewer's own desire to make the photograph mean something rather than a fixed meaning contained in the photograph itself. He argues that this accessibility makes a Surrealist function especially visible by drawing out the viewer's own desires and unconscious. Chiba also points to the humor of a 1958 self-portrait pair that juxtaposes an egg with Yamamoto's nude body curled into a similar shape.

Stojković argues that Yamamoto's postwar photographic narratives connected his Surrealist background with emerging conceptual and performative uses of photography. She also describes Yamamoto's work as a point of reference both for the prewar Japanese avant-garde and for the development of contemporary art and photography in Japan.

=== Public-sector commissions and a dual register of practice ===
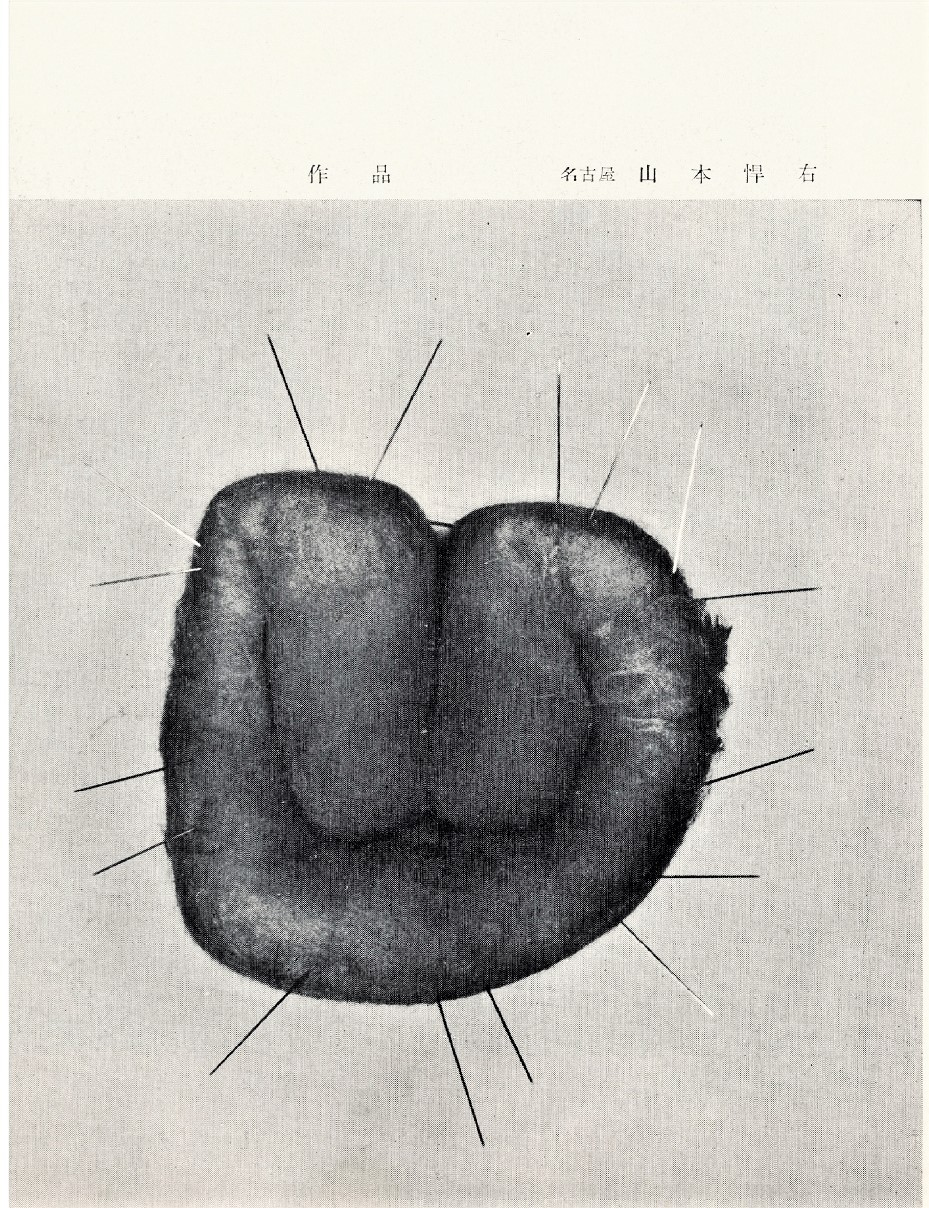
Photograph by Kansuke Yamamoto (published as "Work"), reproduced in Shashin Techō, vol. 2, no. 5 (January 1950).

Alongside his renewed activity in postwar artist-run and experimental circles in Nagoya, the Yamamoto chronology records that from April 1949 he produced publicity photographs as a contracted contributor for Aichi Prefecture's public relations office. The same chronology records additional examples of Yamamoto's media-facing work in 1950, including reproduction of a photograph in Shashin Techō (vol. 2, no. 5) as part of the roundtable "Zen'ei shashin o kataru zadankai" ("Roundtable on avant-garde photography") on 1 January 1950. It also records publication of his photograph Idō shinzō-kōfuku no kage ("Heart in Motion-Shadow of Happiness"), now in the collection of the Art Institute of Chicago, in the Shintōkai Shimbun on 25 January 1950, accompanied by a short thriller by mystery writer Motomasa Hattori. The chronology further records that a portrait photograph of Isamu Noguchi by Yamamoto was published in the Shintōkai Shimbun on 15 July 1950. It additionally records that from 13–26 September 1950 he contributed a 13-part newspaper series titled Kōhī no hanashi ("Coffee talk") to the Shintōkai Shimbun.

=== Postwar subject matter ===
Maddox argues that Yamamoto's Surrealist vocabulary remained politically charged after the war and that photography continued to serve as a means of critical inquiry.

In Sleepy Sea (1953), she reads a toy gun marked "Japan" and a compass without a needle as a commentary on Japan's lack of direction after the war and on the acceptance of the U.S. military presence.

The Yamamoto chronology records that in 1954 Yamamoto visited Hiroshima and Nagasaki and made photographs titled Hiroshima (1954) and Nagasaki (1954). The Getty Museum's Japan's Modern Divide exhibition presented Yamamoto's postwar photographs within a broader institutional narrative of postwar photographic debates and the afterlives of war.

Munro notes that Yamamoto returned to the birdcage motif after the war, with later images placing frail human figures inside the cages; she discusses these works in terms of postwar confinement and vulnerability.

=== Artist-run groups and durable networks ===
The selected chronology in Japan's Modern Divide records that Yamamoto joined the Bijutsu Bunka Kyokai in 1949 and left the association in 1954. It also records a dense sequence of artist-run activity in the 1950s, including the founding of the photo group Mado ("Window") in 1953; the formation in Nagoya of Hono'o ("Flame") in 1955 (with Yamamoto continuing to participate in Hono'o exhibitions through 1961); and the formation of the experimental group ESPACE in 1956, with an ESPACE exhibition appearance recorded in 1958. The same chronology records that he participated in the formation of Nihon Shukanshugi Shashin Renmei (Japanese Subjectivism Photography Federation) in 1956, and that in 1958 he participated in the formation of Zen'ei Shijin Kyokai (Avant-Garde Poetry Association) and formed Arukishine, an 8mm filmmaking group. It further records that he formed the group NAGOYA 5 in 1963 and that the group organized exhibitions in 1963 and 1964.

Curatorial and institutional accounts of postwar photography in Nagoya describe the period as one in which realist and subjective approaches "vied closely," and they situate the city's experimental circles as a continuing arena for exhibition-making and debate rather than activity confined to Tokyo-centered camera-press networks.

Majella Munro reproduces a copy of the Paris Surrealist bulletin BIEF (no. 5, 15 March 1959) sent to Yamamoto that bears the dedication "Pour Yamamoto, ses amis" ("For Yamamoto, his friends") together with signatures including André Breton, Radovan Ivšić, Jean Schuster, Benjamin Péret, José Pierre, Joyce Mansour, Robert Benayoun, Toyen, Jean-Louis Bédouin, Mimi Benoît, Jean Benoît, and Gérard Legrand. Munro presents this item as concrete evidence of Yamamoto's contact with postwar European Surrealists through the circulation of publications and reproductions across national groups. In the same context, Munro describes postwar attempts to rebuild Surrealism's international links via intermediaries such as Simon Watson Taylor, who worked to re-establish contacts and circulate materials across borders in the late 1950s.

=== Dialogue with Europe: Subjektive Fotografie and Otto Steinert ===
A chronology compiled by Toshio Yamamoto records that in May 1956 Yamamoto joined the formation of the Japan Subjective Photography League (日本主観写真連盟), a group that Japanese reference works describe as having been organized by the critic Shūzō Takiguchi and the photographer Kōrō Honjō. The same chronology records that in December 1956 Yamamoto exhibited in the First International Subjective Photography Exhibition (第一回国際主観主義写真展), held at Nihonbashi Takashimaya and organized in connection with the magazine Sankei Camera, with selection credited to Otto Steinert and additional Japanese curatorial involvement noted in the record. Jelena Stojković situates such postwar debates over "subjective photography" within broader arguments about whether photography should be treated primarily as documentary testimony or as an intentionally constructed art, and she notes that the Steinert-linked discourse of Subjektive Fotografie became one of the internationally circulating frameworks for that claim in the 1950s.

In Japanese critical commentary, "subjective photography" has often been framed as a backward-looking nostalgia for prewar avant-garde experimentation, while alternative readings have treated it as a route toward new postwar photographic expression tied to Nagoya-linked photographers and exhibitions. Ryūichi Kaneko notes that a May 1957 special issue of Atelier devoted to subjective photography brought together prewar experimental photographers such as Kansuke Yamamoto and Kōrō Honjō with a newer postwar generation, including Kiyoji Ōtsuji, Ikkō Narahara, Hisae Imai, and Yasuhiro Ishimoto, assembling a substantial body of work in order to argue for a reevaluation of the trajectory of modern Japanese photography. Kaneko adds that this moment of juxtaposition did not prevent prewar figures from being increasingly overshadowed in later accounts of postwar photographic development, even when their work aligned closely with debates about formal construction and sequencing. A later movement-history similarly observes that early criticism of the 1956 international exhibition tended to focus on postwar professionals while giving limited attention to Surrealism-linked prewar amateurs, and it describes Yamamoto's contribution there as multiple-exposure nude imagery treated as an abstract, erotic form. In Stojković's analysis, Yamamoto's prewar and wartime Surrealist procedures—especially his insistence on the photograph as a constructed object and on meaning produced through sequencing—help explain why his work can be read coherently within postwar "subjective" framings of experimental photography.

=== Cross-media practice: poetry, photography, publishing, and exhibition-making ===
Masachika Tani argues that poetry and photography functioned as a single practice for Yamamoto rather than as separate disciplines. Yamamoto's photographs appeared alongside poems, translations, essays, and graphic layouts in small magazines that he edited or contributed to. John Solt describes Yamamoto's poetry as minimalist, Surreal, and witty, emphasizing short, sonorous lines and unexpected images rather than sustained narrative. Solt relates this poetic use of juxtaposition and recombination to the structure of Yamamoto's photographic practice.

Yamamoto's cross-media activity continued after the war through his long involvement with VOU and artist-run groups including VIVI. Majella Munro connects Yamamoto's 1960s films with exchanges between poetry and film in the VOU circle. Munro also relates the formal concerns of Yamamoto's films to Katsue Kitasono's contemporary "plastic poems". Munro reproduces Yamamoto's 1940 poem "Temple Address" and places his photographic and poetic production within a shared Surrealist vocabulary of objects, ritual, and heresy.

=== Darkroom experimentation and the expanded photographic medium ===
The Getty Museum's exhibition biography summarizes Yamamoto's postwar production as technically and formally wide-ranging, noting sustained use of collage and photomontage alongside photograms, experiments with color processes, combination printing, sequential photographic narratives, and three-dimensional works. The Getty Museum further frames Yamamoto as consistently favoring avant-garde forms of expression as a way to engage modern Japanese life obliquely rather than through realist reportage, positioning experimentation as a through-line that connects his prewar publishing activity with postwar work. The Yamamoto Toshio chronology records that in the mid-1950s Yamamoto helped form ESPACE and began producing three-dimensional works, including objects and mobiles, alongside photographic experimentation. Kōtarō Iizawa argues that Yamamoto carried the experimental impetus of the late-1930s Nagoya avant-garde into the postwar period, and he highlights Yamamoto's willingness to combine eroticism and humor with Surrealist construction as a distinctive idiom within Japanese avant-garde photography.

== Film, teaching, and later work (1960s–1980s) ==
In November 1963, Yamamoto showed My Bench as a twelve-part photo story in a NAGOYA 5 exhibition in Tokyo. The work was published with commentary as a twelve-photograph sequence in the April 1964 issue of Camera Geijutsu.

=== Experimental film and cine-poetic practice (1960s) ===
In the exhibition catalogue Surrealism Beyond Borders, Stephanie D'Alessandro and Matthew Gale discuss film (alongside journals and radio) as a key channel through which Surrealism reached new audiences, emphasizing how montage and the cut enabled abrupt juxtapositions beyond the printed page. Munro notes that during the 1960s Yamamoto also made experimental films using domestic 8 mm cameras, extending Surrealist procedures of montage and associative juxtaposition into moving image. Munro records that in January 1963 the VOU Club screened Yamamoto's Comme un cordon alongside works by Osabe Gyōyū and Katsue Kitasono. In Munro's discussion of Yamamoto's surviving cine-poetic practice, two titled films from 1965 are noted: La valse noble and Miroir de la tauromachie. A selected chronology in Japan's Modern Divide records that in June 1965 Yamamoto presented three 8 mm "cine poems" at the VOU Club's Keishō ("Form") exhibition, including La valse noble (5:33) and Miroir de la tauromachie (2:16), and notes that one film is now lost.

=== Mentoring student photographers ===
Beginning in 1966, Yamamoto served for about a decade as an adviser to the Chubu Student Photography Federation. In 1967, he contributed two essays to Photo Opinion (フォト・オピニオン), the bulletin of the federation's high-school section. "On High School Photography—What Does Technique Mean to You?" (高校生写真のこと――技術は君たちにとって何か) appeared in the first issue in February 1967. "Two Certificates in the Dark" (闇の中の二枚の証明書) appeared in the third issue in July 1967.

Photographer Teruo Ishihara later recalled that meeting Yamamoto changed the direction of his own thinking about photography. Ishihara copied Yamamoto's writing on high-school photography into mimeographed form and visited Yamamoto to ask permission to reproduce it. Ishihara recalled that he continued to speak with Yamamoto afterward.

Hideaki Sugiura later recalled that Yamamoto was particularly committed to working with students. Sugiura also recalled that members of the Aichi University photography club looked up to Yamamoto and Keiichirō Gotō. Sugiura records Yamamoto's contributions to the first and third through fifth issues of the photography magazine DIALOGUE. Sugiura also recalls Yamamoto taking part in criticism and editorial meetings for DIALOGUE.

=== Critical engagement: the VERB exhibition (1968) ===
The selected chronology in Japan's Modern Divide records that in 1968 Yamamoto contributed a manifesto to the VERB exhibition and presented the photo series Asa totsuzen ni (朝突然に; "Suddenly, in the Morning"), I–VI. The chronology specifies that the series took the Vietnam War as its subject. The Getty Museum describes Yamamoto's later work more broadly in terms of criticism and rebellion, including works that protested war, promoted liberty, and responded to current events.

=== Late work across media and an anti-promotional stance ===
Yamamoto continued to work across photography, poetry, and related media into his later decades, and a later biography notes that he was "never self-promoting" even when corresponding with French Surrealists to publish their work. The same source adds that he maintained a commitment to Surrealism while other photographic trends formed in Japan and were later historicized, and it points to the 2001 Tokyo Station Gallery retrospective as a key moment in bringing new audiences to his lifelong work. Munro argues that Occupation-era and Cold War frameworks shaped later historiography of Japan's prewar avant-garde and affected how Surrealism's political stakes were narrated after 1945, while also noting that public discourse on Shōwa history in Japan shifted notably after 1989. The J. Paul Getty Museum states that Yamamoto published his only book in 1970 and continued to write poetry thereafter. The Getty further describes him as an "ardent nonconformist" who framed art as criticism, dialogue, and rebellion.

=== Death and final instructions ===
In 1985 the photographer Tsugio Tajima (田島二男) made a rare late photograph of Yamamoto, and Yoshiteru Kurosawa later cited Yamamoto's diary entry dated 28 June written upon the photograph's arrival. In that entry Yamamoto records that the photograph made him sharply aware of being seventy-one, that looking at it filled him with aversion and a sense of physical decline, and that he resolved he would not want to be photographed again. Yamamoto died in Nagoya on 2 April 1987, reportedly of lung cancer. Solt writes that Yamamoto asked in his will to have nothing to do with the customary Buddhist funeral and instead donated his body for medical research at Nagoya University's School of Medicine.

== Reception and legacy ==
Stojković notes that scholarship on Surrealist photography in 1930s Japan developed unevenly: individual photographers and works were discussed, but the field as a whole received little sustained treatment in either histories of photography or histories of Surrealism.

=== Domestic reassessment and retrospectives ===
==== Early posthumous reassessment (1988–1990) ====
Gallery CVs list a posthumous solo exhibition in Tokyo in 1988 (IMAGINATION MARKET Q & P) as an early marker in the domestic rediscovery of Yamamoto's work. The estate chronology reproduced in the 2001 Tokyo Station Gallery catalogue notes that the 1988 Tokyo exhibition was covered by Asahi Shimbun (14 April 1988) and Tokyo Journal, with both pieces reproducing Yamamoto's work. A later gallery biography describes the 2001 Tokyo Station Gallery retrospective Surrealist Yamamoto Kansuke, co-curated by John Solt and Ryuichi Kaneko, as a major reintroduction of Yamamoto's career-spanning practice to new audiences.

The Nagoya City Art Museum's 1990 exhibition Surrealism in Japan: 1925–1945 surveyed prewar Japanese Surrealism across poetry, painting, prints, design, and photography, placing Yamamoto within a broader account of the movement.

==== Retrospective turning point: Tokyo Station Gallery (2001) ====
Later accounts describe the 2001 Tokyo Station Gallery retrospective, Kansuke Yamamoto: Conveyor of the Impossible, co-curated by John Solt and Ryūichi Kaneko, as a turning point in Yamamoto's reception in Japan. In an interview published in Kyoto Journal, Getty curator Amanda Maddox said that Yamamoto became much more widely known in Japan after the exhibition, which attracted about 9,000 visitors.

Writing in 2006, art critic Kōtarō Iizawa recalled that the retrospective had completely changed his view of Yamamoto. He had previously thought of Yamamoto mainly as a Surrealist from the Nagoya scene, but came to see an originality that went beyond the local context and a pioneering quality that could not be contained within the groups to which he belonged. Iizawa also argued that Yamamoto's influence and the wider scope of his work deserved further study.

In 2012, Iizawa again described the 2001 retrospective as a major turning point. He noted that it revealed a much broader picture of Yamamoto as a poet and painter as well as a photographer, and brought his postwar work into clearer view. Iizawa also discusses Solt's description of Yamamoto as an "ephemeralist", relating it to a concern with fragile and transient beauty.

==== Reassessment of prewar–postwar continuity ====
In 2001, Jō Takeba described Yamamoto as a “rare poet” (稀有な詩人), and also a photographer, who had sustained Surrealist poetic experimentation in Nagoya across the prewar and postwar periods. In Takeba's account, Yamamoto's Surrealist poetic experimentation is not confined to his prewar photography but continues into the postwar period.

Writing in the catalogue for the 2001 Tokyo Station Gallery retrospective, Ryūichi Kaneko argues that Yamamoto's postwar avant-garde photography was largely overlooked in the 1950s, when the Realism in Photography movement dominated Japanese photographic culture. He stresses the breadth and variety of Yamamoto's postwar career and argues that his work should not be divided into separate prewar and postwar histories. Kaneko also presents Yamamoto's place within the development of Japanese photography in the 1930s and 1940s as a subject requiring further study.

In the English version of the essay published in Japan's Modern Divide in 2013, Kaneko makes the historiographical problem more explicit. He notes that postwar Japanese photography has often been narrated as beginning with the Realism in Photography movement of the 1950s, followed by the rise in the 1960s of photographers such as Shōmei Tōmatsu, Ikkō Narahara, Eikoh Hosoe and Kikuji Kawada, whom he describes as the “VIVO generation.” Within this account, Kaneko argues, Yamamoto's work was pushed to the margins and treated mainly within the limited contexts of Nagoya and the avant-garde associated with VOU. He points instead to the richness and variety of Yamamoto's postwar work, as well as its increased complexity and strength, and rejects the accepted division of his career into prewar and postwar periods. Kaneko extends the same argument to modern Japanese photography as a whole, calling for its history, despite the interruption of war, to be reconsidered as continuous and interconnected.

Writing in 2006, Yoshiteru Kurosawa questioned the common view of avant-garde photography as a prewar movement that ended with the war. He pointed instead to its continuation after 1945, citing Yamamoto as a photographer who remained engaged with the avant-garde. Kurosawa identified Yamamoto and Keiichirō Gotō as key figures in the development of postwar avant-garde photography in Nagoya.

=== International reception and scholarship ===
In 2017, photography critic Kōtarō Iizawa wrote that Yamamoto's work had undergone a rapid reassessment since the 1990s, with exhibitions held in Japan and abroad. Iizawa also wrote that Yamamoto was increasingly being recognized as one of the artists essential to discussions of the relationship between Surrealism and photography.

In a 2014 interview conducted by Eiko Aoki, Getty curator Amanda Maddox said that most of the material available to the curators on Yamamoto was in Japanese. Maddox added that John Solt was one of the few writers who had published on Yamamoto in English.

In 2016, Masachika Tani discussed Yamamoto alongside Iwata Nakayama and Kiyoji Ōtsuji in the French Surrealist journal Mélusine. Tani argues that the three photographers each pursued a different possibility suggested by Surrealist photography, adapting it to Japanese conditions and introducing new elements.

A 2018 feature in IMA noted renewed attention in Europe and the United States to Japanese avant-garde photography collectives active from around 1930 to the early 1940s. Its survey included Yamamoto in its account of the Nagoya Photo Avant-Garde and described his practice as extending across poetry, photography, and objects.

In The International Encyclopedia of Surrealism (2019), Jelena Stojković writes that Yamamoto had become a point of reference for the relationship between Surrealism and photography while still in his twenties. Stojković describes his work as an essential component of networks of Surrealist exchange and collaboration in 1930s Japan. Discussing his postwar photographic narratives, she links his Surrealist background directly to emerging conceptual and performative uses of photography. She regards Yamamoto's work as relevant both to histories of the prewar Japanese avant-garde and to the development of contemporary art and photography in Japan.

=== Major museum surveys ===
==== The History of Japanese Photography (2003) ====
Yamamoto was included in the 2003 survey The History of Japanese Photography, organized by the Japan Foundation and the Museum of Fine Arts, Houston. In the accompanying catalogue, Jō Takeba presents Yamamoto as a critic of New Photography's emphasis on objective depiction and its minimization of subjectivity and narrative content. Takeba cites Yamamoto's 1932 photocollages and his essay "Title and Theme" in discussing this position. He also notes that Yamamoto remained active as a Surrealist photographer throughout the 1930s. The catalogue reproduces Untitled (variant of Bird Cage of the Temple) (1940) and The Developing Thought of a Human ... Mist and Bedroom and (1932).

==== Drawing Surrealism (2012–2013) ====
Yamamoto was included in Drawing Surrealism, organized by the Los Angeles County Museum of Art and the Morgan Library & Museum. The LACMA checklist includes two photographs by Yamamoto from around 1938. Reviewing the Morgan presentation for The New York Times, Roberta Smith wrote that Yamamoto's photographs "combine drawing, collage and rephotography" and described them as a "riff" on Salvador Dalí.

==== Japan's Modern Divide at the Getty (2013) ====
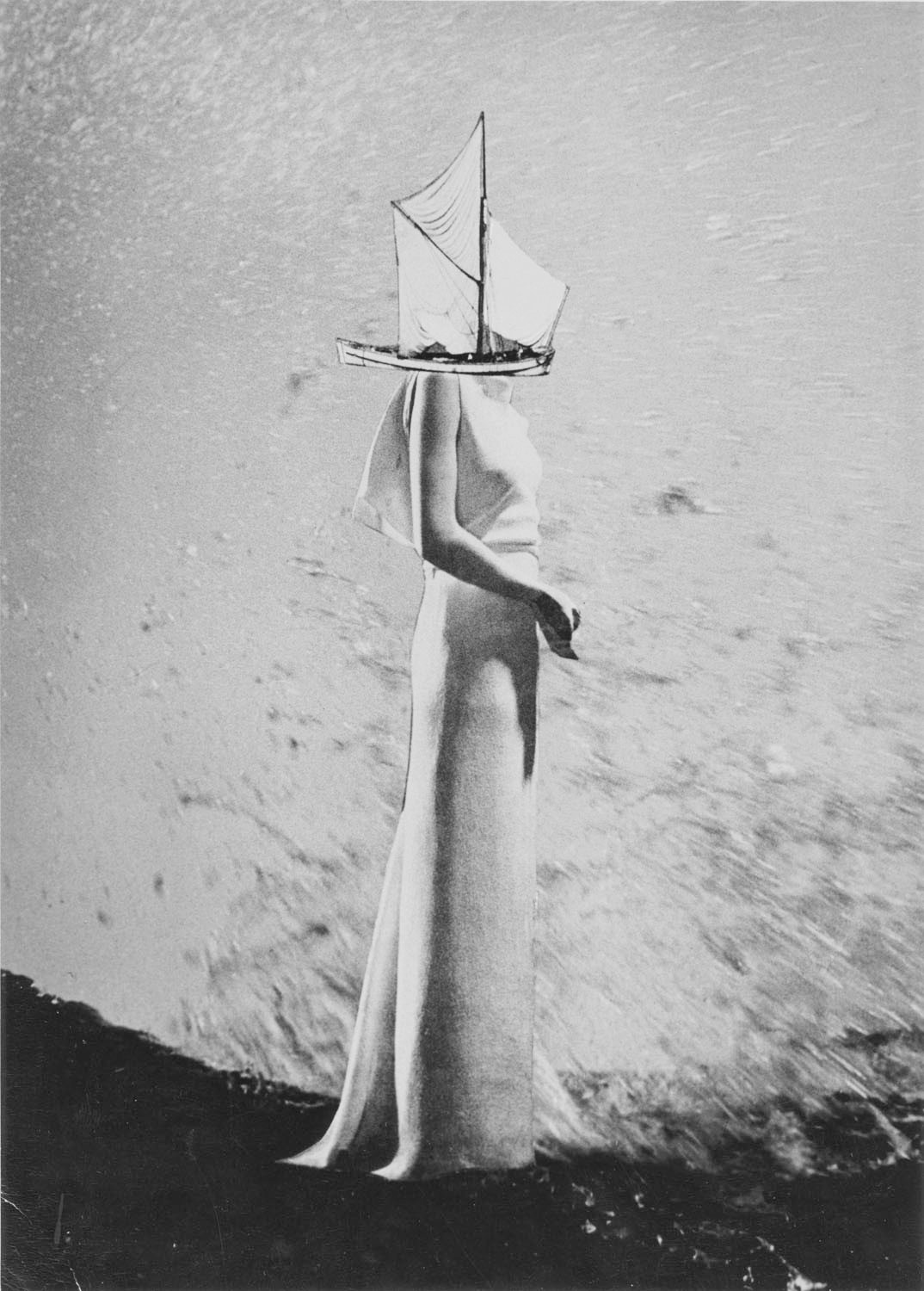
A Chronicle of Drifting, 1949, now in the collection of the J. Paul Getty Museum and exhibited in Japan's Modern Divide in 2013.

The J. Paul Getty Museum presented Japan's Modern Divide: The Photographs of Hiroshi Hamaya and Kansuke Yamamoto at the Getty Center in Los Angeles from 26 March to 25 August 2013. The museum presented Hiroshi Hamaya and Yamamoto as photographers who followed "important but alternate paths" in Japanese photography, contrasting Hamaya's documentary approach with Yamamoto's avant-garde practice. In a later interview, curator Judith Keller said that the exhibition treated the two artists as representatives of "two very different veins" in mid-twentieth-century Japanese photography and described them as "exceptional representatives" of those directions.

Eiko Aoki wrote that placing Hamaya and Yamamoto in parallel chronological contexts reframed mid-twentieth-century Japanese photography through Hamaya's documentary approach and Yamamoto's Surrealist viewpoint. Aoki reported that the Getty exhibition drew about 360,000 visitors over five months, compared with about 9,000 visitors to Yamamoto's 2001 retrospective at Tokyo Station Gallery. She described the Getty exhibition as a "huge step" toward the "international mainstream recognition" of Yamamoto's work. Reviewing the exhibition for the Los Angeles Times, Leah Ollman contrasted Hamaya's realism with Yamamoto's work as "fueled by intense subjectivity."

In the catalogue foreword, Getty director Timothy Potts writes that in the postwar period Yamamoto could think and work "globally" and express "provocative ideas" without the threat of the censorship that had prevailed before the war. Potts describes Hamaya and Yamamoto as "major talents" through whom the exhibition introduced two threads of twentieth-century Japanese photography, the objective and the expressive. Potts also records that the Getty acquired selections of rare prints by Yamamoto for its collection.

Kōtarō Iizawa begins his catalogue essay by describing Hamaya and Yamamoto as stylistically like "oil and water", but notes that they belonged to nearly the same generation and began taking photographs at almost the same time, in 1930 and 1931 respectively. Iizawa places both photographers within the rise of Shinkō shashin (New Photography) in the 1930s, before their practices developed in different directions. He writes that Yamamoto inherited the experimental spirit of the Nagoya Photo Avant-Garde and continued to develop it after the war. Iizawa concludes that their work shows how possibilities inherent in New Photography later "flowered and bore fruit."

==== Shape of Light at Tate Modern (2018) ====
Yamamoto was included in Shape of Light: 100 Years of Photography and Abstract Art, held at Tate Modern from 2 May to 14 October 2018. In the catalogue foreword, Tate Modern director Frances Morris writes that the exhibition traces photography's shared history with art through abstractions produced with the camera and darkroom. She describes it as the first exhibition in many years to survey the relationship between photography and abstract art.

Tate's large-print guide lists two works by Yamamoto, Title Unknown (1940) and The Thrilling Game Related to Photography (1956). The latter is listed as a gelatin silver print on paper and glass on paper. Both works were loans from the Jack Kirkland Collection in Nottingham.

Reviewing the exhibition for Felix, Fred S. Fyles called The Thrilling Game Related to Photography an "emblem for the exhibition as a whole." He described it as a small box in which a photograph of glass shards is pierced by actual shards of glass. For Fyles, the work collapses distinctions between sculpture, art, and photography while retaining a sense of playfulness. He added that works of this kind were among the exhibition's most compelling because they were little seen within the mainstream photographic canon.

==== Surrealism Beyond Borders (2021–2022) ====
Surrealism Beyond Borders, co-organized by The Metropolitan Museum of Art and Tate Modern in 2021–2022, included Yamamoto in a survey spanning almost eight decades of work from 45 countries and reconsidering Surrealism beyond a history focused primarily on Western Europe. In the catalogue chapter "Points of Convergence", Stephanie D'Alessandro and Matthew Gale include amateur photography clubs in prewar Nagoya and Osaka among the meeting places through which Surrealist ideas circulated. The same chapter identifies Tokyo as a relay point for exchanges across East Asia. Jelena Stojković discusses Yamamoto in a chapter on the photography clubs of Osaka and Nagoya. D'Alessandro and Gale also include Yamamoto alongside Shūzō Takiguchi and Ichirō Fukuzawa in their discussion of the repression of Surrealism under rising militarism in Japan.

==== Foreign Exchange at the Art Institute of Chicago (2024) ====
In 2024, Yamamoto's work was included in Foreign Exchange: Photography between Chicago, Japan, and Germany, 1920–1960 at the Art Institute of Chicago. The exhibition examined modernist photography through exchanges among artists in Germany, Japan, and the United States from 1920 to 1960.

==== Cut + Paste at the Smithsonian's National Museum of Asian Art (2025–2026) ====
In 2025–2026, the Smithsonian's National Museum of Asian Art devoted a section titled "Wake Up and Dream" to Yamamoto in Cut + Paste: Experimental Japanese Prints and Photographs, an exhibition drawn entirely from the museum's permanent collection. The exhibition text describes Yamamoto as a poet and artist grounded in Surrealism who, over more than four decades, explored the "subversive potential of language and imagery" from the repressive policies of late-1930s Japan through the turbulent postwar years. It also notes his use of photography and collage to arrange familiar objects into dreamlike settings with hidden meanings.

=== Teaching and curricula ===
In the Getty classroom curriculum Surrealism in Poetry and Art, lesson 8 reproduces Yamamoto's photograph I'd Like to Think While inside the Body of a Horse (1964) and uses it to prompt close looking and discussion of Surrealist juxtaposition. The same lesson then asks students to create a digitally manipulated photograph through a collage-like process combining their own images. A University of Florida course syllabus for "ARH 4XXX - Global Surrealisms" includes a session titled "Japan: Kansuke Yamamoto, Yamanaka Tiroux" and assigns Amanda Maddox's chapter on Yamamoto from the Getty publication Japan's Modern Divide. In Japan, a Rikkyo University English-taught seminar syllabus (Humanities Study 6) includes "Poem with Photograph, Yamamoto Kansuke" within its unit on VOU and postwar visual poetry. A Tel Aviv University graduate seminar syllabus on Japanese photography (A Short History of Japanese Photography: Imported Technology, Local Images) lists Japan's Modern Divide: The Photographs of Hiroshi Hamaya and Kansuke Yamamoto among its assigned readings for the period.

=== Wider circulation and market reception ===
The February 2013 issue of Vogue Japan featured My Thin-Aired Room (1956).

In 2017, Karl Lagerfeld included Yamamoto's Icarus's Episode (1949) in his selection for Paris Photo, and the photograph was reproduced in the accompanying volume Paris Photo by Karl Lagerfeld.

In 2019, a vintage print of Reminiscence (1953) sold at Sotheby's for US$50,000, above its high estimate of US$30,000. ArtDaily reported the result as a new auction record for Yamamoto. Sotheby's later included the work in its year-end feature "Sotheby's Most Memorable Photographs Sold in 2019".

In January 2021, the apparel brand Graniph released a collaboration T-shirt with the Nagoya City Art Museum featuring a 1940 photograph by Yamamoto catalogued by the museum as a variation of Buddhist Temple's Birdcage.

Yamamoto's Untitled (c. 1949) was reproduced in "Sleepwalking", the summer 2022 issue of Aperture (no. 247). Later that year, Taka Ishii Gallery presented works by Yamamoto at the inaugural Paris+ par Art Basel. Speaking to The New York Times, Taka Ishii said that Yamamoto's historical works "don't look old" and can look "very fresh", adding that "Surrealism is very popular right now".

== Works and style ==
=== Recurring motifs of enclosure and communication ===
Maddox identifies a recurring vocabulary of suppression in Yamamoto's wartime photographs, including barred windows, hats clipped with clothespins or pierced with pins, and a telephone trapped inside a birdcage. In Buddhist Temple's Birdcage (1940), she reads the pairing of the birdcage and telephone as an image of enforced silence and restricted communication, while Munro similarly relates the work to wartime restrictions on speech and print.

The birdcage continued to appear in Yamamoto's work after the war. Munro notes that later images place frail human figures inside cages and discusses them in terms of confinement and vulnerability. In Reminiscence (1953), an empty birdcage appears over a city view; a Sotheby's catalogue note reads the work as evoking war and its aftermath, while finding a note of hope in the absence of a trapped bird.

=== Translation, intermedia practice, and critical positions ===
The J. Paul Getty Museum describes Yamamoto as an "innovative artist" who advanced the avant-garde movement in Japan and developed what it calls a "signature style" combining European-inspired Surrealist iconography with distinctly Japanese motifs and concerns. The museum also notes that Yamamoto developed an interest in both photography and poetry as a teenager. His self-published journal Yoru no Funsui (The Night's Fountain, 1938–39) brought together his own poems, texts, drawings, and photographs.

Masachika Tani writes that poetry and photography were ultimately one for Yamamoto, who wrote poems while taking photographs and took photographs while writing poems. Amanda Maddox writes that Yamamoto conveyed political concerns through photographs and poems as well as through translations, newspaper articles, and teaching. She also points to department-store exhibitions, a weekly newspaper column, interviews, reproductions in newspapers and journals, and poetry as ways in which these concerns circulated. Maddox argues that Yamamoto used photography to communicate the need for "personal, free expression". She later writes that Surrealism enabled him to convey his commitment to freedom and to "attempt to incite change".

John Solt notes that Yamamoto read poetry in French, English, and Japanese and describes his creations as "transpositions of the international Modernist idiom into a Japanese linguistic framework". Solt also writes that Yamamoto's poems and photographs "ricochet in parallel" and could equally depict imaginary worlds. Comparing Yamamoto with Iwata Nakayama and Kiyoji Ōtsuji, Tani argues that each pursued a different possibility suggested by Surrealist photography, adapting it to Japanese conditions while introducing new elements.

In a 2007 essay published by the Nagoya City Art Museum, Jō Takeba describes Nagoya's photographic avant-garde as developing around two contrasting poles, Minoru Sakata's hybrid of Surrealism and abstract art and Yamamoto's "poetic imagery". Sakata pursued "photographic automatism" through close-up "object photographs" of natural forms, whereas Yamamoto excluded chance and constructed "poetic imagery" by deliberately arranging ready-made objects invested with specific meanings. Takeba also places the late-1930s popularity of Surrealism among art students and young artists against Japan's turn toward totalitarianism. He writes that Surrealism offered a means of expressing private reverie and lyricism, while its promised "liberation of sensibility" remained unrealized and the movement also circulated as a "style".

In the "Japan" entry in The International Encyclopedia of Surrealism, Yuko Ishii and Michael Richardson write that Yamamoto's work in a range of different modes is difficult to sum up. The entry suggests that, if an overall theme can be discerned, it is perhaps a "confrontation with time and space" that challenges everyday notions of their interrelation.

=== Technique and the expanded photographic medium ===
Munro situates Yamamoto within a broader Surrealist "discourse on the object" in Japan that drew on vernacular precedents—such as the tokonoma alcove and the elevation of everyday things through display—while remaining oriented toward avant-garde critique. She argues that object-making was not separate from two-dimensional media but often integrated with them; in Yamamoto's case, the photograph can function as the record of a constructed object, blurring the boundary between staged object and image. The birdcage-and-telephone work of 1940 (discussed in the literature as Temple Speech / Buddhist Speech) is emblematic of this logic, in which a constructed object is "fixed" through photographic presentation.

Jō Takeba identifies this use of objects as one of Yamamoto's most noteworthy modes of expression around 1940, singling out works in which everyday ready-made objects were deliberately “composed and staged” (構成・演出). Takeba argues that Yamamoto used these objects not as visual jokes but as symbolic metaphors, forming what he describes as an already autonomous expressive world.

Yamamoto also set out this concern with objects in his own writing. In “Shashin ni kansuru kanketsu na zatsugen” (“Brief Notes on Photography”), published in VOU in October 1940, he described contemporary photography as involving “the exploration of objects and the pursuit of materiality.” In the same text, Yamamoto wrote of “new combinations of objects that symbolize the content of life.” Takeba relates this formulation to Yamamoto's method of bringing things into unexpected encounters and creating a poetic space that could be understood as an “event.”

==== Construction in the print: montage, photograms, combination printing ====
Institutional accounts emphasize that Yamamoto treated photography as an experimental medium and a material object rather than a purely representational one, manipulating the photographic print through physical intervention and emphasizing its materiality. Alongside photomontage and collage, he pursued camera-less and hybrid procedures—including photograms, combination printing, and experiments with color.

Maddox highlights Yamamoto's use of physical cut-outs and apertures in View with a Ship Passing Through: rectangular holes are cut through layered paper, creating a literal "window" that activates negative space as a compositional force. She connects this emphasis on absence and interval to the Japanese concept of ma—a spatial and temporal "between"—framing Yamamoto's Surrealist construction as both materially interventionist and culturally situated.

In a close reading of The Developing Thought of a Human … Mist and Bedroom, a hand-colored photocollage held by the Nagoya City Art Museum, Kaneko describes how Yamamoto tore open the black photographic surface to reveal newspaper clippings beneath it and pasted three cut-out photographs of lips alongside cut-outs of a woman's face and a leg in a high-heeled shoe, leaving the work's construction visible on the surface of the print. In his account, Yamamoto did more than adopt collage as a formal device associated with Dada and Surrealism; he used it for sharp social criticism in the specific context of early-1930s Japan. The visible headlines concern disarmament and a sharp fall in the yen. Kaneko identifies the clippings as reports on the Geneva Disarmament Conference (1932) and the Great Depression. The articles, in his reading, anticipate Japan's path from peace to war, marked by its expansion on the Asian continent after the Manchurian Incident (1931) and its withdrawal from the League of Nations (1933). The work had long been undated, but research for the 2001 retrospective Surrealist Yamamoto Kansuke established that it was made in 1932, when Yamamoto was eighteen. Kaneko regards this discovery as a landmark for understanding the formation and development of modern Japanese photography in the 1930s. He also writes that the work's "level of artistic expression" is "on a par with that of any contemporaneous European artists."

Writing about Drawing Surrealism at the Morgan Library & Museum, The New York Times critic Roberta Smith noted that Yamamoto's photographs from around 1938 "combine drawing, collage and rephotography," describing them as a creative "riff" on Salvador Dalí rather than a straightforward imitation.

=== Staging, seriality, and narrative ===
Staging and sequencing became important elements of Yamamoto's postwar photographic narratives. In It Is Raining In Town, My Room Is, Full of Fragments and My Thin-Aired Room, he used three or more staged photographs to create dreamlike narratives, appearing in the images as both actor and director.

Maddox identifies Magritte's Man with a Newspaper (1928) as a model for My Thin-Aired Room. She describes Yamamoto's work as a variation on Magritte's four-part composition, recast as a staged photographic sequence in which disappearance unfolds from one image to the next.

Kōtarō Iizawa distinguishes Yamamoto's sequences from the journalistic photo-essay, describing them instead as constructions of impossible situations through successive photographs. Masachika Tani discusses The Forgotten Person, which he dates to 1957, as a five-image sequence in which a female figure gradually disappears and changes form. Iizawa also compares Yamamoto's use of photographic sequences with the later work of Duane Michals, noting that Yamamoto was working in this form more than a decade earlier.

In 1956, Kitasono praised My Thin-Aired Room in VOU as Yamamoto's most original achievement and as a "revelation" for avant-garde photography. Stojković argues that Yamamoto's postwar photographic narratives linked his Surrealist background to emerging conceptual and performative uses of photography. She also describes his work as a point of reference both for histories of the Japanese prewar avant-garde and for the development of contemporary art and photography in Japan.

=== Subject matter and indigenization ===
Art historian John Solt emphasizes that Yamamoto's originality is inseparable from his choice of subject matter. Rather than relying only on the familiar European repertoire of Surrealist objects, Yamamoto applied Surrealist procedures to vernacular fixtures of Japanese daily life—such as a futon piled high in an open field, the torn paper panels of a shōji (sliding screen), and the numbered lockers of a public bathhouse. Even in ostensibly direct photographs, Masachika Tani, a professor at Waseda University, notes that Yamamoto selected ordinary Japanese interiors and objects—such as torn shoji screens, gloves on tatami, or futon bedding displaced into open fields—to produce an estranging effect akin to Surrealist "dépaysement". Tani further notes that Yamamoto often juxtaposed such culturally specific fixtures with a Jungian "archetypal landscape"—most often dunes or the sea—so that viewers confront not only unlikely conjunctions of objects but also an encounter between distinct cultural registers.

Maddox likewise emphasizes that Yamamoto's estrangements frequently depend on specifically Japanese fixtures—such as shikibuton (futon mattresses) and shōji sliding screens—objects that had no direct referents within the canonical iconography of Surrealism in the West. In the collage View with a Ship Passing Through (c. 1940), she further argues that the work's punctures and broad blank interval can be read through the aesthetics of ma (meaningful interval or rhythmic pause), grounding Surrealist montage in a local visual logic rather than in stylistic quotation alone.

=== Comparative dialogues with European Surrealism ===
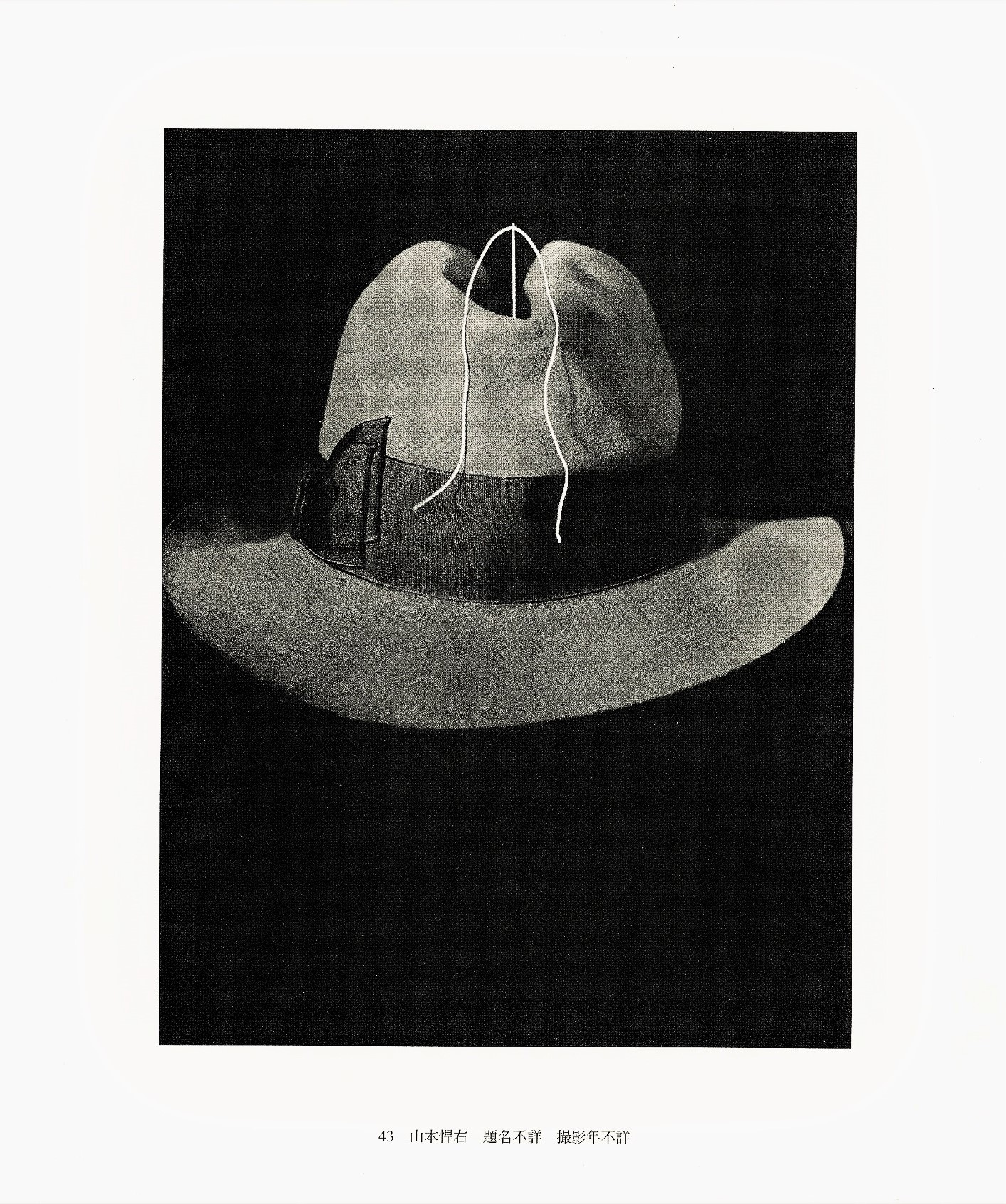
Title unknown, 1940, Kansuke Yamamoto

In her essay for Japan's Modern Divide, Amanda Maddox emphasizes that seemingly "derivative" elements in Yamamoto's work should not be taken as evidence of mere formal imitation; rather, she frames him as an interpreter who engaged Surrealism abroad in order to expand its visual lexicon within the conditions of modern Japan. More generally, hats recur in Surrealist art and film as standardized accessories that can be displaced into uncanny or subversive forms.

Maddox also highlights View with a Ship Passing Through (1940) as referencing works by Lee Miller and Dora Maar, while distinguishing Yamamoto's work through its use of empty space, which she relates to the Japanese concept of ma (a rhythmic pause or gap).

She further reads Sleepy Sea (1953) as a direct response to Magritte's The Reckless Sleeper (1928), noting that Yamamoto replaces Magritte's stone form with a silhouetted profile.

As another comparison, Maddox calls Yamamoto's Madam Q (1950) a "direct corollary" of Man Ray's La tête (1931), noting the shared device of a floating female head against a blank ground and Yamamoto's transformation of the motif through graphic, fan-like patterns of hair and compressed theatrical staging.

==== Experimental film and cine-poetic practice (1960s) ====
Munro notes that, during the 1960s, Yamamoto and Kitasono Katsue produced experimental short films using domestic 8mm cameras, a practice facilitated by the expanded availability of consumer recording equipment in Japan from 1959 onward. In January 1963, the VOU Club screened Yamamoto's Comme un cordon alongside Osabe Gyōyū's Fixed Eye and Kitasono's Un corps à corps. Munro adds that Osabe's contribution—described by contemporary coverage as a humorous drama concerning an umbrella and linked to theories of the object—together with Yamamoto's films from this screening are presumed lost, while select works by Kitasono and Yamamoto were later re-issued under the title Glass Wind (1998).

The surviving material circulated in a black-and-white, silent VHS release produced for highmoonoon by John Solt—Glass Wind: Kansuke, Kit Kat, and Kazuo: Three Avant-garde Japanese Masters (1998)—which presents Yamamoto's two extant 8mm films (La valse noble and Miroir de la tauromachie, both 1965) alongside three shorts by Kitasono Katsue and an additional filmed photo session of the butō dancer Kazuo Ohno shot by Laura Davidson during Ohno's 1993 U.S. tour; the compilation runs approximately 41 minutes. The release credits graphic design to Kenjirō Yamaguchi and notes that the cover sheet was printed in Japan, while the video itself was made in the United States.

Among the films preserved in that re-issuing, Yamamoto's La valse noble (1965) presents a western-looking woman in a white dress dancing against a black background; the footage is shot and replayed at varying speeds, at times inverted, and shifts from an uncanny, erotically charged figurative sequence toward abstraction, as white forms rhythmically disperse across the screen. Munro reads the film's emphasis on formal properties in relation to Kitasono's contemporaneous "plastic poems" and to the continuing, interdisciplinary traffic between poetry and film within the VOU milieu. She further describes Yamamoto's Miroir de la tauromachie (Mirror of the Bullfighter, 1965) as a rapid montage that alternates a reclining woman (repeatedly obscuring her face with her hands) with close-ups and textures—fallen leaves, wave-like organic lines, surf, a tortoiseshell-like pattern, and a pendulum—before fading to black. Contemporary critics, Munro notes, were ambivalent toward Kitasono's drift into abstraction, and in comparative remarks found Yamamoto's "photographic technique more fresh and dynamic."

===== Film (selected) =====
- Comme un cordon (8mm film; screened at the VOU Club, January 1963; presumed lost)
- La valse noble (8mm film, 1965)
- Miroir de la tauromachie (Mirror of the Bullfighter; 8mm film, 1965)

== Artistic practice ==
Solt cautions against retrospectively describing Yamamoto as a lifelong Surrealist, noting that his work absorbed a range of influences over almost sixty years. Solt uses "experimental" as a general term for Yamamoto's work, including his Surrealist, abstract, and other photography, in contrast to realistic press photography.

=== Photography and perception ===
Stojković notes that in his 1940 essay "A Concise Vilification with Regard to Photography", Yamamoto described the instant the shutter is released: "all things within a chosen angle fly into a fixed mask". In the same text, he wrote about searching for objects and for new relations between them that could "symbolize living content".

Around 1941, Yamamoto wrote that new thinking is created by combining unknown concepts and that, for poets, words are both a tool for thinking and the material of thought. In an editorial note for Carnet Bleu, he dismissed much contemporary photography as "boring", discussed the means and methods that could be drawn from photography, and called photography "our unavoidable means".

In 1949, Yamamoto warned against overestimating the mechanism of the lens, writing that "there is no way that reality can be copied". In 1950, he called for a move away from over-rationality and lyricism and for the creation of a new beauty based on the human psyche. In 1953, he wrote that "the surreal exists within the real" and that tireless experimentation with new photography leads to the creation of new beauty.

In 1967, Yamamoto advised younger photographers not to rely on technical advice or photography magazines but to develop their own way of seeing. The same year, he wrote that what one photographs is more important than how it is expressed.

=== Art, freedom, and revolution ===
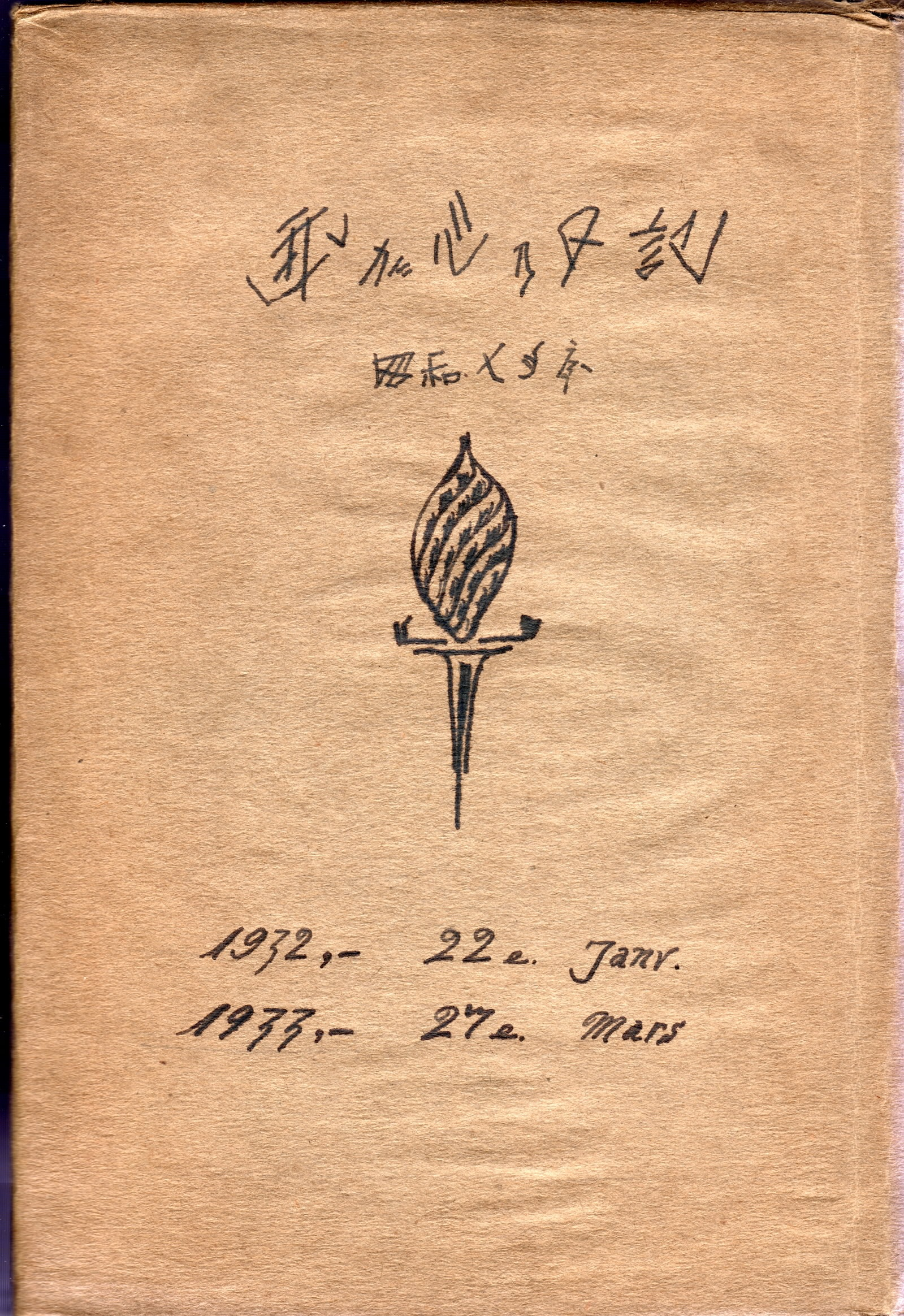
Kansuke Yamamoto's diary (22 January 1932 – 27 March 1933)

Amanda Maddox cites a 1932 diary entry in which Yamamoto wrote that he was "not the kind of person who can be a social activist", and interprets his use of current-affairs material in The Developing Thought of a Human... Mist and Bedroom as "exercising his activist spirit through his art".

In a 1939 questionnaire response, Yamamoto warned against hurried excitement and wrote that judgment and inquiry required time in order to produce work of high artistic value. In a 1940 text, he wrote that constraints are always present and that "there is freedom even within the dark stone walls of a prison".

Maddox cites Yamamoto's diary entry of 24 June 1941 as confirming his philosophical differences with the Nagoya Photo Avant-Garde, quoting his statement that "Art work comes out of some disobedient spirit against ready-made things of society". The Getty Museum's exhibition text gives a longer quotation from Yamamoto's 1941 diary:

"Artwork comes out of some disobedient spirit against readymade things of society. ... Pure spirit should be a proactive spirit that attracts a new generation ... Rebellion against each generation and the reformation of a generation is our purpose."

In 1977, Yamamoto wrote that experimental photography had no practical use or function and located its "superiority" in its "total lack of purpose, complete uselessness, and absolute meaninglessness". He also wrote that "good photos aim at revolution" and that they "emerge from everyday events and connect to revolution". In 1980, he wrote that a work of art both responds to its time and helps create it, adding that "true beauty creates the future" and that art must raise questions.

=== Independence and the commercial establishment ===
Ryūichi Kaneko describes Yamamoto as having maintained his "proud independence" throughout his career and, despite his participation in groups such as the Nagoya Photo Avant-Garde and VOU, as "at heart a solitary photographer" who remained independent and autonomous.

Solt identifies Yamamoto's lack of interest in self-promotion as one reason for his relative neglect and writes that he remained committed to avant-garde principles and "pure experimentation". He notes that photography and poetry journals and group exhibitions gave Yamamoto enough outlets to "ignore the commercial establishment".

In a 1972 essay on plagiarism published in DIALOGUE 3, Yamamoto cited the idea that even remarkably "pure" creation might consist largely of imitation, with only a small part belonging to the individual creator. He argued that plagiarism was policed in order to protect the value attached to originality as a commodity, comparing originality to money. Yamamoto also noted that plagiarism had once been regarded as a virtue and as a form of respect for creation, and asked what had turned it into an offense.

== Character and personality ==
- Yoshio Shimozato described Yamamoto as "a man who was, in many respects, nihilistic, tenacious, and in love with books."
- John Solt described Yamamoto as "dignified and self-effacing" in his dealings with others.
- Yamamoto was a bibliophile and a devoted smoker, and throughout his life was rarely without books, records, and a pipe.
- Yamamoto formed a close and lasting friendship with photographer Keiichiro Goto, whom he met through the Seidōsha circle around 1938.
- In 1939, he joined the avant-garde poet group ''VOU'' led by Katsue Kitasono, and continued to publish work in ''VOU'' and participate in its exhibitions until the group dissolved in 1978.
- In 1959, a copy of issue no. 5 of BIEF, signed by several European Surrealists including Benjamin Péret, was sent to Yamamoto.
- Iwao Kameyama, the publisher of Yamamoto's book Butterfly, was a close friend of Yamamoto.
- In an essay published in 1988 on photographer Minoru Sakata, Yamamoto referred to Sakata in the title as an esteemed friend. Recalling a meeting in 1939, Yamamoto wrote that he could not accept Sakata's decision to link photographic innovation with nationalism, but ended the essay by expressing profound respect for him.

== Collections ==
In the foreword to the Getty Museum's catalogue Japan's Modern Divide, museum director Timothy Potts frames Kansuke Yamamoto not as a peripheral or merely "rare" figure but as a representative of a defining, "expressive" and "modern" thread in twentieth-century Japanese photography—an artist able to think and work "globally"—set in deliberate counterpoint to Hiroshi Hamaya's "objective" and "traditional" documentary realism. Potts records that supporters in Japan, France, and the United States enabled the Getty to acquire selections of rare prints by Yamamoto. He credits Maya Ishiwata, John Solt, Stephen Wirtz, and Toshio Yamamoto with making the museum aware of Yamamoto's importance and the location of surviving prints.

- Nagoya City Art Museum
- Tokyo Photographic Art Museum
- Santa Barbara Museum of Art
- The J. Paul Getty Museum(J. Paul Getty Trust)
- The Art Institute of Chicago
- National Museum of Asian Art, Smithsonian Institution(Smithsonian's Freer | Sackler), Washington DC
- Aichi Prefectural Museum of Art
- The Morgan Library & Museum, New York.
- Museum of Modern Art, New York City (MoMA)

=== Selected works in public collections ===
MoMA's online collection records list two works by Yamamoto available to view online.

- Museum of Modern Art (MoMA)
  - Icarus's Episode, 1949, Gelatin silver print, Object number 310.2025
  - Oval Landscape, 1963, Gelatin silver print, Object number 311.2025
- Art Institute of Chicago
  - Buddhist Temple's Birdcage, 1940, Gelatin silver print, 25.7 × 17.9 cm.
  - Heart in Motion - Shadow of Happiness, 1950, Gelatin silver print, Reference Number 2017.158
  - Giving Birth to a Joke, 1956, Gelatin silver print, Credit Line: Gift of Helen and Sam Zell, Reference Number 2024.1163
- J. Paul Getty Museum
  - My Thin-Aired Room (空気のうすいぼくの部屋) (sequence), 1956, gelatin silver print; J. Paul Getty Museum (Los Angeles), accession no. 2009.17.12, 2009.17.13, 2009.17.14.; Maddox notes that the series presents a four-frame narrative variation on René Magritte's Man with a Newspaper (1928), which Yamamoto copied (under Julien Levy's alternate title "Now You Don't") from Levy's 1936 book Surrealism.
    - My Thin-aired Room(Sequence), 1956, Gelatin silver print, Object Number 2009.17.14
    - My Thin-aired Room(Sequence), 1956, Gelatin silver print, Object Number 2009.17.13
    - My Thin-aired Room(Sequence), 1956, Gelatin silver print, Object Number 2009.17.12
  - Untitled, about 1930s, Gelatin silver print Object Number 2019.184.5
  - Untitled, about 1930s, Gelatin silver print Object Number 2019.184.1
  - Untitled, about 1930s, Gelatin silver print, Object Number 2019.184.6
  - (Untitled) [Snow scene], 1930s, Gelatin silver print, Object Number 2009.17.1
  - (Untitled) [Side of Building], 1930s, Gelatin silver print, Object Number 2009.17.2
  - Untitled, about 1935, Gelatin silver print, Object Number 2014.21.1
  - Untitled, 1939, Gelatin silver print, Object Number 2019.184.4
  - (Untitled) [Footprint in sand], 1939, Gelatin silver print, Object Number 2009.17.3
  - (Untitled) [String shapes in grass], 1939, Gelatin silver print, Object Number 2009.17.4
  - Untitled, about 1940, Gelatin silver print, Object Number 2019.184.3
  - (Untitled)[Hat with string], 1940, Gelatin silver print, Object Number 2009.17.5
  - (Untitled) [Abstract architectural view], about 1940, Gelatin silver print, Object Number 2009.17.7
  - (Untitled) [Shadow on side of building], about 1940, Sepia toned gelatin silver print, Object Number 2009.17.6
  - (Untitled) [Abstract wall with hole], about 1940, Gelatin silver print, Object Number 2009.17.8
  - A Chronicle of Drifting, 1949, Gelatin silver print collage, Object Number 2014.21.2
  - A Certain Female Image, 1955, Gelatin silver print, Object Number 2009.17.9
  - Those Who Do Not Return, 1956, Gelatin silver print, Object Number 2009.17.11
  - The Origin of History, 1956, Chromogenic print, Object Number 2009.17.10
  - A Forgotten Person, 1957, Gelatin silver print, Object Number 2009.17.15
  - A Forgotten Person, 1958, Chromogenic print, Object Number 2009.17.16
  - Requiem, 1958, Gelatin silver print, Object Number 2009.17.17
  - I'd Like to Think While inside the Body of a Horse, 1964, Gelatin silver print, Object Number 2009.17.18
  - Magnifying Glass, Rendez-vous, 1970, Gelatin silver print with string, Object Number 2009.17.19
  - The silver platter and the pigeon in the cage, We suddenly have spring rain like typefaces today. Cioran, I may talk to you again someday., 1979, Hand-colored ferrotyped gelatin silver print collage, Object Number 2009.17.20
- National Museum of Asian Art, Smithsonian Institution
  - Untitled (little man collage), 1932-1933, Gelatin silver print collage, Accession Number S2018.2.329
  - Untitled (sea egg/distant horizon), 1938, Gelatin silver print, Accession Number S2018.2.330
  - Stapled Flesh, 1949, Gelatin silver print, Credit Line: Purchase and partial gift from the Gloria Katz and Willard Huyck Collection — Acquisition fund in honor of Julian Raby, director emeritus of the National Museum of Asian Art, Accession Number S2018.2.331
  - Cold Person (torso with extrusions), 1956, Gelatin silver print, Accession Number S2018.2.332
  - Magnifying Glass, Rendez-vous (clouds and thread), 1970, Gelatin silver print with cotton thread, Accession Number S2018.2.333
- Santa Barbara Museum of Art
  - Untitled (fence and wall), ca. 1930s, gelatin silver print, Credit Line: SBMA, Museum Purchase with funds provided by the Wallis Foundation, Object number 2006.57.4
  - Untitled (wall with window), 1940, gelatin silver print, Object number 2006.61.3
  - Untitled (fields and sewing machine), ca. 1950, gelatin silver print, Object number 2006.57.8
- Nagoya City Art Museum
  - Development of a Man's Thought…Mist and Bed Room, 1932, gelatin silver print, Reference Number 2009.08.056.001
  - [Shadow], 1932–33, gelatin silver print, Reference Number 2009.08.049.001
  - [Nude on the Beach], 1938, gelatin silver print, Reference Number 2009.08.053.001
  - [Variation of "Buddhist Tempie's Bird cage"], 1940, gelatin silver print, Reference Number 2009.08.052.001
  - [Bed Seats], 1940, gelatin silver print, Reference Number 2009.08.050.001
  - [Hat], 1940, gelatin silver print, Reference Number 2009.08.051.001
  - Work, 1950, gelatin silver print, Reference Number 2009.08.055.001
  - Work, 1956, gelatin silver print, Reference Number 2009.08.054.001
- Aichi Prefectural Museum of Art
  - Gentle Resource (やさしい回帰), 1948, gelatin silver print, Accession number JF201900001000
- Tokyo Photographic Art Museum
  - (Object of Hat), 1930, gelatin silver print, Accession number 10113557
  - (Bathroom Shelf and Chair), 1935, gelatin silver print, Accession number 10113562
  - （Soil wall）, 1935-1944, gelatin silver print, Accession number 10113555
  - （Glassy plain and cloth）, 1940, gelatin silver print, Accession number 10113556
  - （Art object of lattice）, 1950, gelatin silver print, Accession number 10113559
  - Photogram, 1950, gelatin silver print, Accession number 10113563
  - （Portrait of wife）, 1950, gelatin silver print, Accession number 10113561
  - Madam Q, 1950, gelatin silver print, Accession number 10113554
  - （Nude）, 1954, gelatin silver print, Accession number 10113560
  - （Art object of circle）, 1954, gelatin silver print, Accession number 10113558

== Archival and related materials ==
In addition to photographs held in museum collections, materials related to Yamamoto are preserved in literary, library, and municipal repositories. Original issues 1–4 of Yoru no Funsui, the Surrealist journal edited and published by Yamamoto, are held by the Museum of Modern Japanese Literature. Nagoya City also holds Yamamoto-related materials, including Yoru no Funsui, postcards by Yamamoto, and the Nagoya mamehon series Butterfly; the listed storage location for these materials is the Cultural Path Futaba Museum in Nagoya. The National Diet Library holds Yamamoto's book Butterfly as well as periodicals and related publications associated with his activities, including VOU.

== Exhibitions ==
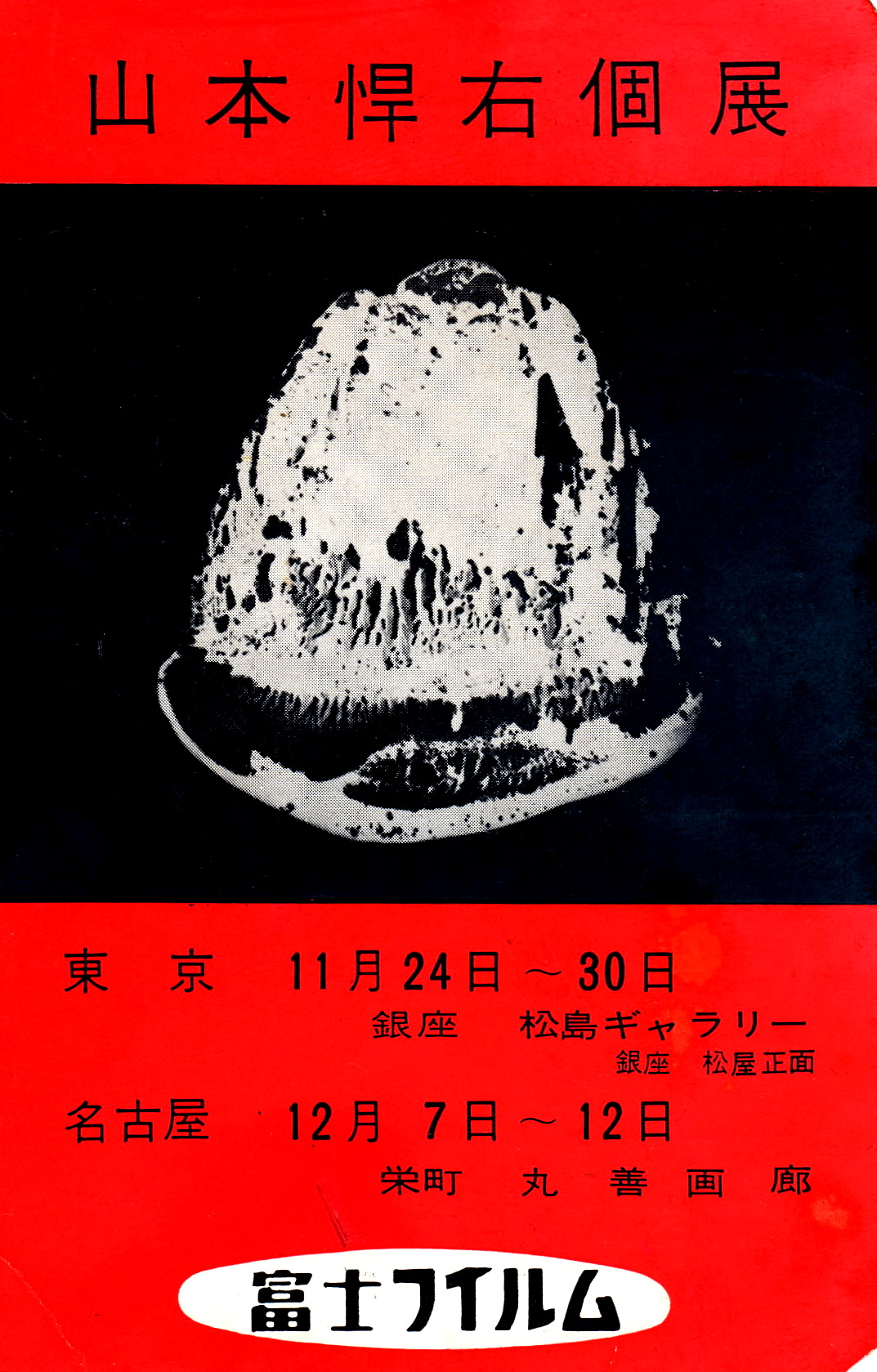
Kansuke YAMAMOTO Exhibition 1956. Tokyo & Nagoya .

=== Selected major museum and survey exhibitions ===
Yamamoto's work has been included in major museum survey exhibitions in the United States, Europe, and Japan, including:

- 2021–2022 Surrealism Beyond Borders — The Metropolitan Museum of Art, New York (11 Oct 2021–30 Jan 2022); Tate Modern, London (24 Feb–29 Aug 2022).
- 1960 The Sense of Abstraction — The Museum of Modern Art (MoMA), New York, United States.
- 2018 Shape of Light: 100 Years of Photography and Abstract Art — Tate Modern, London, United Kingdom.
- 2013 Japan's Modern Divide: The Photographs of Hiroshi Hamaya and Kansuke Yamamoto — J. Paul Getty Museum, Los Angeles, United States.
- 2012–2013 Drawing Surrealism — Los Angeles County Museum of Art (LACMA); The Morgan Library & Museum.
- 2003 The History of Japanese Photography — The Museum of Fine Arts, Houston, U.S.A.
- 2007 Living in the Material World -'Things' in Art of the 20th Century and Beyond — The National Art Center, Tokyo, Japan
- 2025–2026 Cut + Paste: Experimental Japanese Prints and Photographs — National Museum of Asian Art, Smithsonian Institution, United States.
- 2026–2027 The Surrealist Book: Tomorrow Lives in Mirrors — Museum of Modern Art, New York, United States.
- 2026–2027 Myths and Monsters: The Art of Fantasy in Asia — M+, Hong Kong.

=== Exhibitions (chronological) ===
- 1936 Personal Exhibition / Maruzen Gallery, Nagoya, Japan
- 1939 "The Blue Wonder Association Exhibition" / Maruzen Gallery, Nagoya, Japan
- 1948 – 1950 "VIVI" / Maruzen Gallery, Nagoya, Japan
- 1949 "Modern Art" / Mitsukoshi Gallery, Nihonbashi, Japan
- 1949 – 1954 "Bijyutsu Bunka Art Association Exhibition" / Tokyo Metropolitan Art Museum etc.
- 1952 "Photographers of Figurative art" / Aoyanagi-Hirokoji-Ten, Nagoya, Japan
- 1953 "Mado(Windows)" / Nagoya, Kobe, Japan
- 1953 "Abstraction and Fantasy: How to Understand Non-figurative (Non-realistic) Painting" / National Museum of Modern Art, Tokyo
- 1956 – 1961 "Honoo(Flame)" / Konica Gallery(Konica Minolta Plaza), Tokyo, Osaka, and Nagoya, Japan
- 1956 "International Subjective Photography" / Takashimaya Gallery, Nihonbashi, Japan
- 1956 Personal Exhibition / Matsushima Gallery, Ginza, Japan
- 1956 Personal Exhibition / Maruzen Gallery, Nagoya, Japan
- 1957 Personal Exhibition / Konica Gallery(Konica Minolta Plaza), Fukuoka, Japan
- 1957 – 1976 "VOU Exhibition" / Kunugi Gallery, Ginza, Tokyo, Japan etc.
- 1957 "Modern Art Photography Group" / Kunugi Gallery, Ginza, Tokyo, Japan
- 1958 "ESPACE" / Maruzen Gallery, Nagoya, Japan
- 1958 "Exhibition of Japan Subjective Photography" / Fuji Photo Salon(FUJIFILM Photo Salon), Tokyo, Japan
- 1958 Acute Angle Black Button (16–20 December), galerie-librairie Mimatsu (Mimatsu Shobō Gallery), Tokyo, Japan; advertised in the exhibition leaflet under the title "The Vanguard of Photography and Poetry".
- 1958 "The Vanguard of Photography and Poetry" / Mimatsu Publishing, Inc. Gallery, Tokyo, Japan
- 1960 "The Sense of Abstraction" / The Museum of Modern Art (MoMA), New York CityA.
- 1960 "Subjective Photography" / Konica Gallery(Konica Minolta Plaza), Tokyo, Japan
- 1963 "Shusen Kai"
- 1963 – 1964 "Nagoya Five" / Fuji Photo Salon(FUJIFILM Photo Salon), Tokyo, etc.
- 1968 "VERB" / Aichi Prefectural Museum of Art, Japan
- 1978 – 1982 "The Exhibition of The Committee of The Chubu Headquarter of The All-Japan Association of Photographic Societies" / Aichi Prefectural Museum of Art, Japan
- 1983 "Pictures of Yamamoto Kansuke" / New French School, Nagoya, Japan
- 1986 "Avant-Garde Photography, Italy and Japan / The Contemporary Art Gallery, Seibu Department Stores, Ikebukuro, Tokyo, Japan
- 1986 "VOU" / Rhode Island School of Design Museum
- 1988 "The Art of Modern Japanese Photography" / Two Houston Center
- 1988 "Surrealist Kansuke Yamamoto Exhibition" / IMAGINATION MARKET Q&P, Ginza, Tokyo, Japan
- 1988 "The 150 years of Fine Art Photography – France, Japan, America" / Tsukashin Hall, Amagasaki, Hyogo, Japan
- 1988 "Fine Art Photography in Japan 1920's – 1940's" / Konica Plaza(Konica Minolta Plaza), Shinjuku, Tokyo, Japan
- 1988 "Japanese Photography in 1930s" / The Museum of Modern Art, Kamakura, Japan

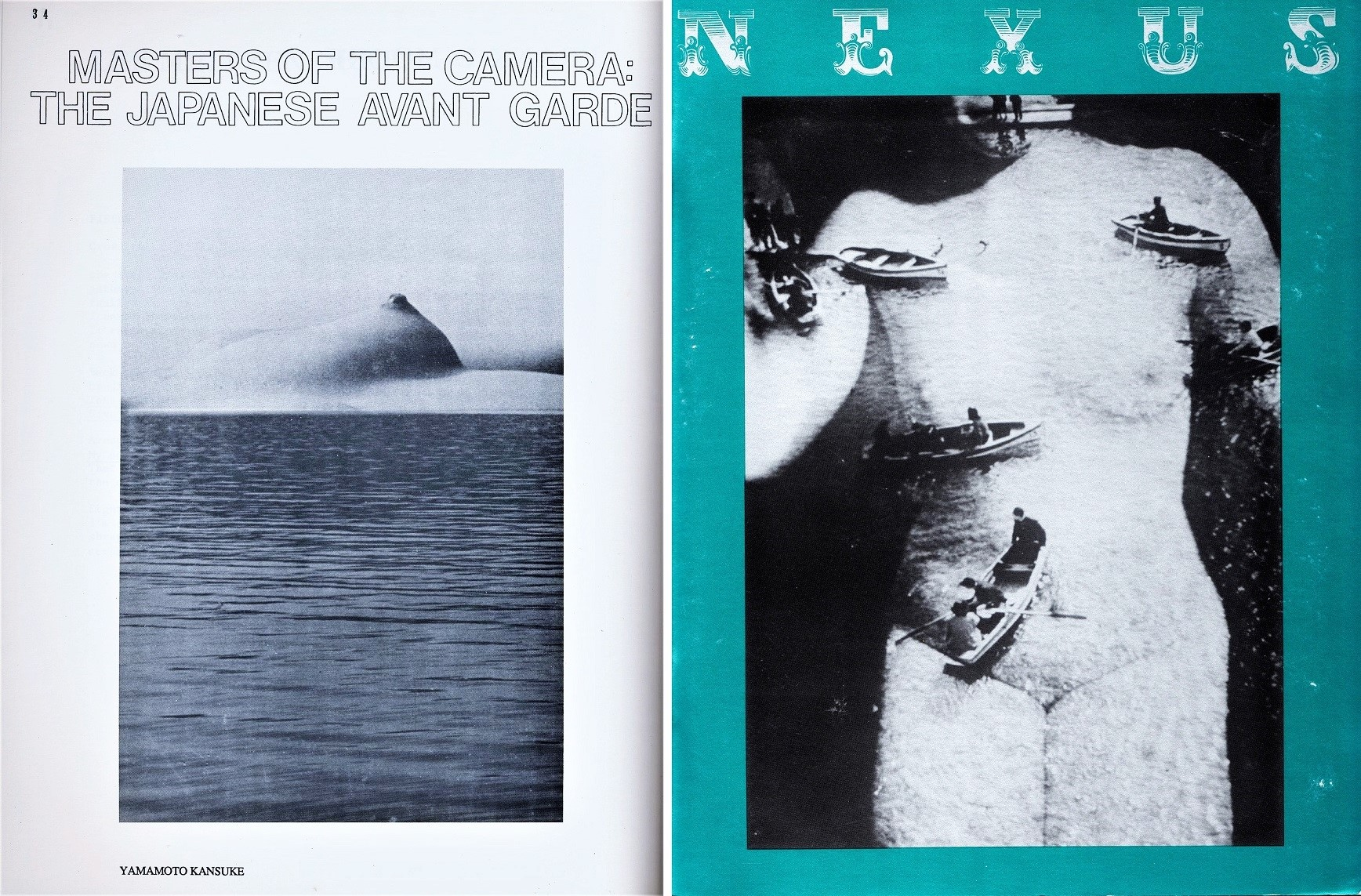
MASTERS OF THE CAMERA : THE JAPANESE AVANT GARDE, YAMAMOTO KANSUKE, published in NEXUS vol.24, Dayton OH. U.S.A. 1989

- 1989 "Avant-Garde Photography of Nagoya" / Nagoya City Art Museum, Japan
- 1990 "The Silent Dialogue: Still Life in the West and Japan" / Shizuoka Prefectural Museum of Art, Japan
- 1990 "Surrealism in Japan" / Nagoya City Art Museum, Japan
- 1990 "Modernism in Nagoya 1920's – 1930's" / INAX Gallery, Nagoya, Japan
- 1995 "The Founding and Development of Modern Photography in Japan" / Tokyo Metropolitan Museum of Photography, Japan
- 1995 "The Age of Modernism" / Tokyo Metropolitan Museum of Photography, Japan
- 1995 "Collage, A Method of Contemporary Art" / Nerima Art Museum, Japan
- 2001 "Modern Photography in Japan 1915–1940" / Ansel Adams Gallery, San Francisco, U.S.A.
- 2001 "Yamamoto Kansuke: Conveyor of the Impossible" / Tokyo Station Gallery, Japan

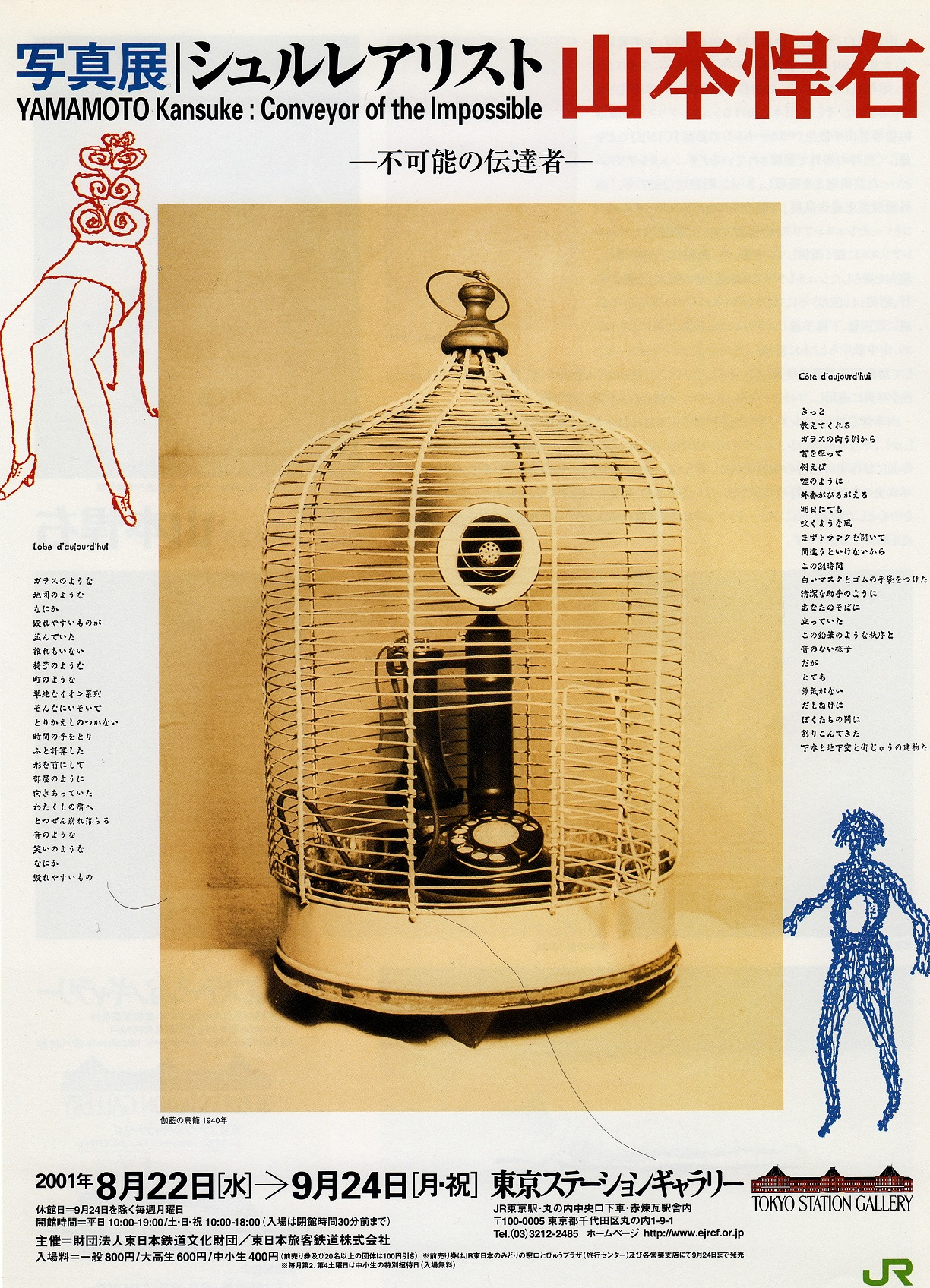
YAMAMOTO Kansuke exhibition at Tokyo Station Gallery, 2001

- 2003 "The History of Japanese Photography" / The Museum of Fine Arts, Houston, U.S.A.
- 2003 "The History of Japanese Photography" / Cleveland Museum of Art, Ohio, U.S.A.
- 2004 "Provincial Fine Arts" / Nagoya City Art Museum, Aichi, Japan
- 2005 "How Photography changed People's Viewpoints" / Tokyo Metropolitan Museum of Photography, Japan
- 2006" Kansuke Yamamoto" / Stephen Wirtz Gallery、San Francisco, U.S.A.
- 2006 "Curators' Choice from The Collection of Tokyo Metropolitan Museum of Photography" / Tokyo Metropolitan Museum of Photography, Japan
- 2006 "Collage and Photomontage" / Tokyo Metropolitan Museum of Photography, Japan
- 2006 "The Art of ‘Nagoya' – So Far and From Now On" / Nagoya City Art Museum, Aichi, Japan
- 2006 "The World of Yamamoto Kansuke" / Doshisha University, Tokyo office
- 2007 "The New Modern: Pre- and Post-War Japanese Photography" / Santa Barbara Museum of Art, Santa Barbara, U.S.A.
- 2007 "Master the Museum's Collection" / Nagoya City Art Museum, Japan
- 2007 "Living in the Material World -'Things' in Art of the 20th Century and Beyond" / The National Art Center, Tokyo, Japan
- 2008 "Surrealism and Photography -BEAUTY CONVULSED-" / Tokyo Metropolitan Museum of Photography, Japan
- 2009 "20 Years of Nagoya City Art Museum" / Nagoya City Art Museum, Japan
- 2010 "Master the Secrets of Museum's Collection" / Nagoya City Art Museum, Japan
- 2012 "Drawing Surrealism" / Los Angeles County Museum of Art (LACMA), Los Angeles, U.S.A.
- 2012 "Japan ・ Object 1920's – 70's" / Urawa Art Museum, Saitama, Japan

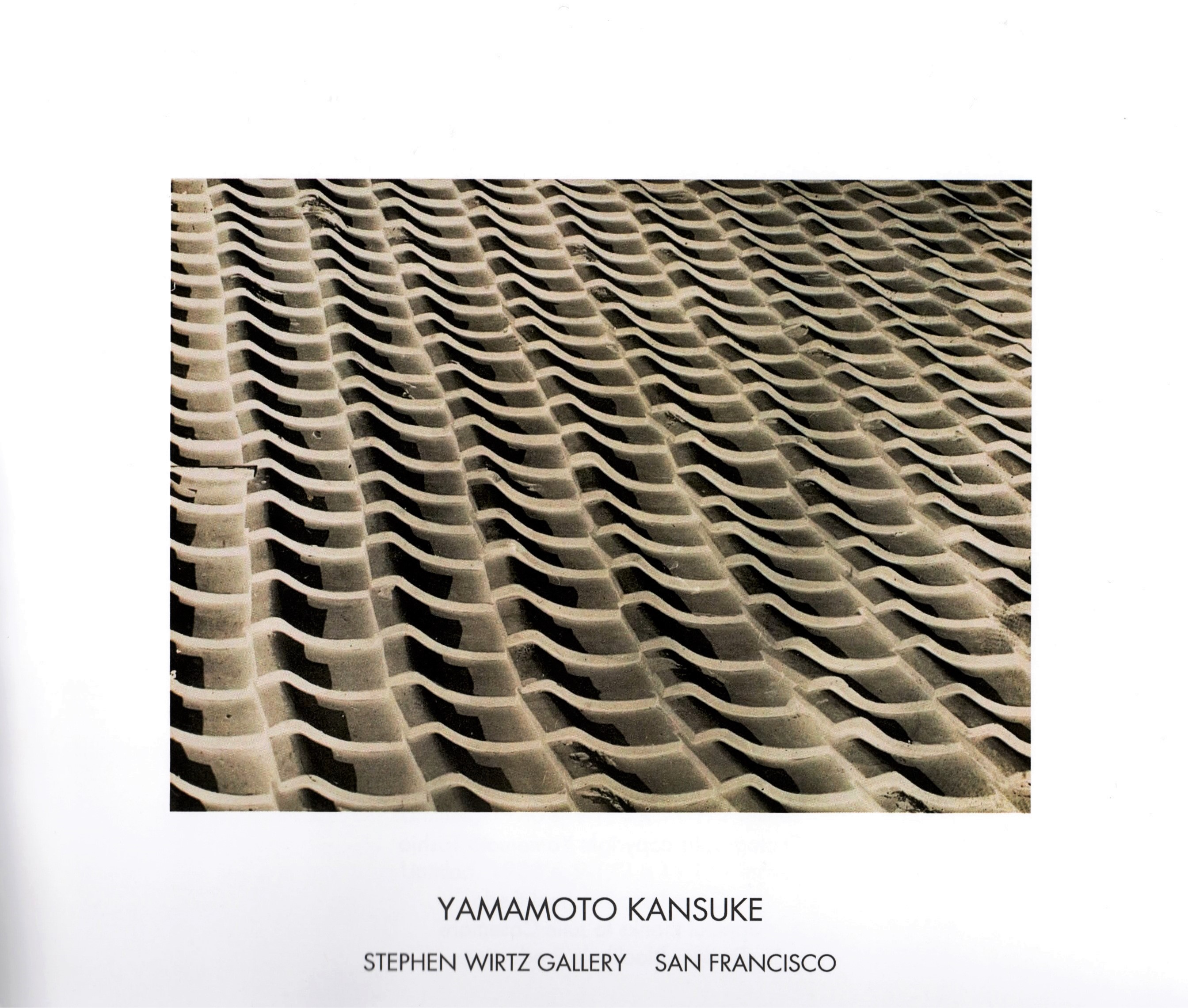
Kansuke Yamamoto exhibition 2006. STEPHEN WIRTZ GALLERY, SAN FRANCISCO.

- 2013 "Drawing Surrealism" / The Morgan Library & Museum, New York CityA.
- 2013 "Japan's Modern Divide: The Photographs of Hiroshi Hamaya and Kansuke Yamamoto" / The J. Paul Getty Museum, Los Angeles, U.S.A.
- 2014 "Enjoy the Art World −with your loved one" / Nagoya City Art Museum, Japan
- 2015 "1940s -Rediscovery of 20th Century Japanese Art" / Mie Prefectural Art Museum, Japan
- 2015 Paris Photo 2015(amanasalto) / Grand Palais, Paris, France

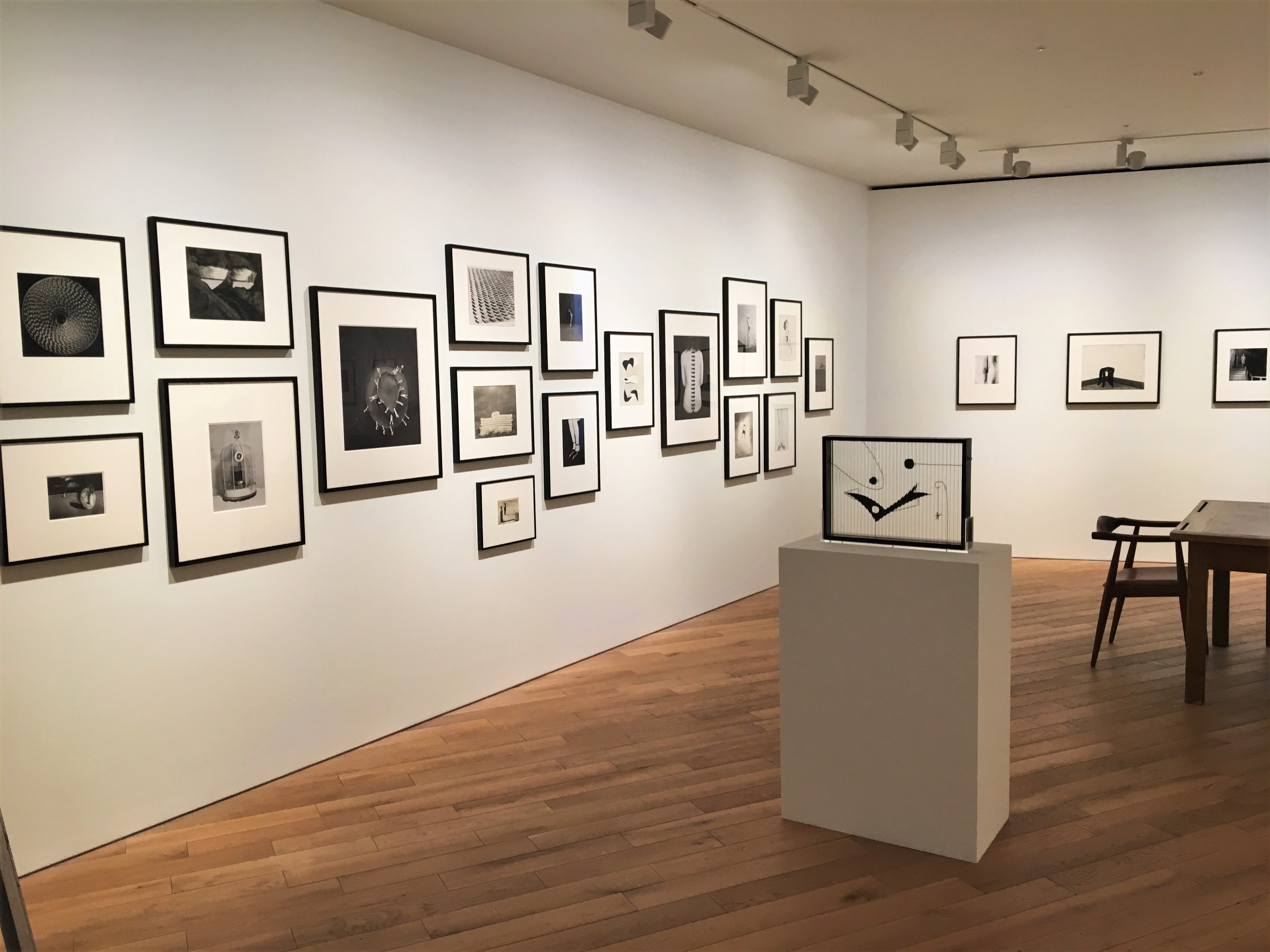
Kansuke Yamamoto exhibition 2017 Taka Ishii Gallery Tokyo

- 2016 Art Central Hong Kong(amanasalto), Hong Kong
- 2016 "Kansuke Yamamoto" / Taka Ishii Gallery New York, New York City
- 2016 Art Basel (Taka Ishii Gallery), Basel, Switzerland
- 2016 Frieze London, Frieze Art Fair (Taka Ishii Gallery), London, England
- 2016 Paris Photo 2016(Taka Ishii Gallery) / Grand Palais, Paris, France
- 2016 "BLACK SUN/RED MOON" / RATIO 3, San Francisco, U.S.A.
- 2016 Japanese Photography from Postwar to Now — San Francisco Museum of Modern Art (SFMOMA), San Francisco (15 Oct 2016–12 Mar 2017).
- 2017 "Kansuke Yamamoto" / Taka Ishii Gallery Photography / Film, Roppongi, Tokyo
- 2017 Group Exhibition "Japanese Surrealist Photography" / Taka Ishii Gallery Tokyo, Roppongi, Tokyo
- 2017 Art Basel Hong Kong (Taka Ishii Gallery) / Hong Kong
- 2017 "Kansuke Yamamoto" / Taka Ishii Gallery New York, New York City
- 2017 SP-Arte (Taka Ishii Gallery) / Fundação Bienal de São Paulo, São Paulo, Brazil
- 2017 Art Basel (Taka Ishii Gallery) / Basel, Switzerland
- 2017 Frieze London, Frieze Art Fair (Taka Ishii Gallery), London, England
- 2017 Paris Photo 2017(Taka Ishii Gallery) / Grand Palais, Paris, France
- 2018 "THE MAGAZINE and THE NEW PHOTOGRAPHY: KOGA and JAPANESE MODERNISM." / Tokyo Photographic Art Museum
- 2018 "SHAPE OF LIGHT 100 YEARS OF PHOTOGRAPHY AND ABSTRACT ART" / Tate Modern, London, England
- 2018 "Kansuke Yamamoto" / Taka Ishii Gallery New York, New York City
- 2018 "Kansuke Yamamoto" / Nonaka-Hill, Los Angeles

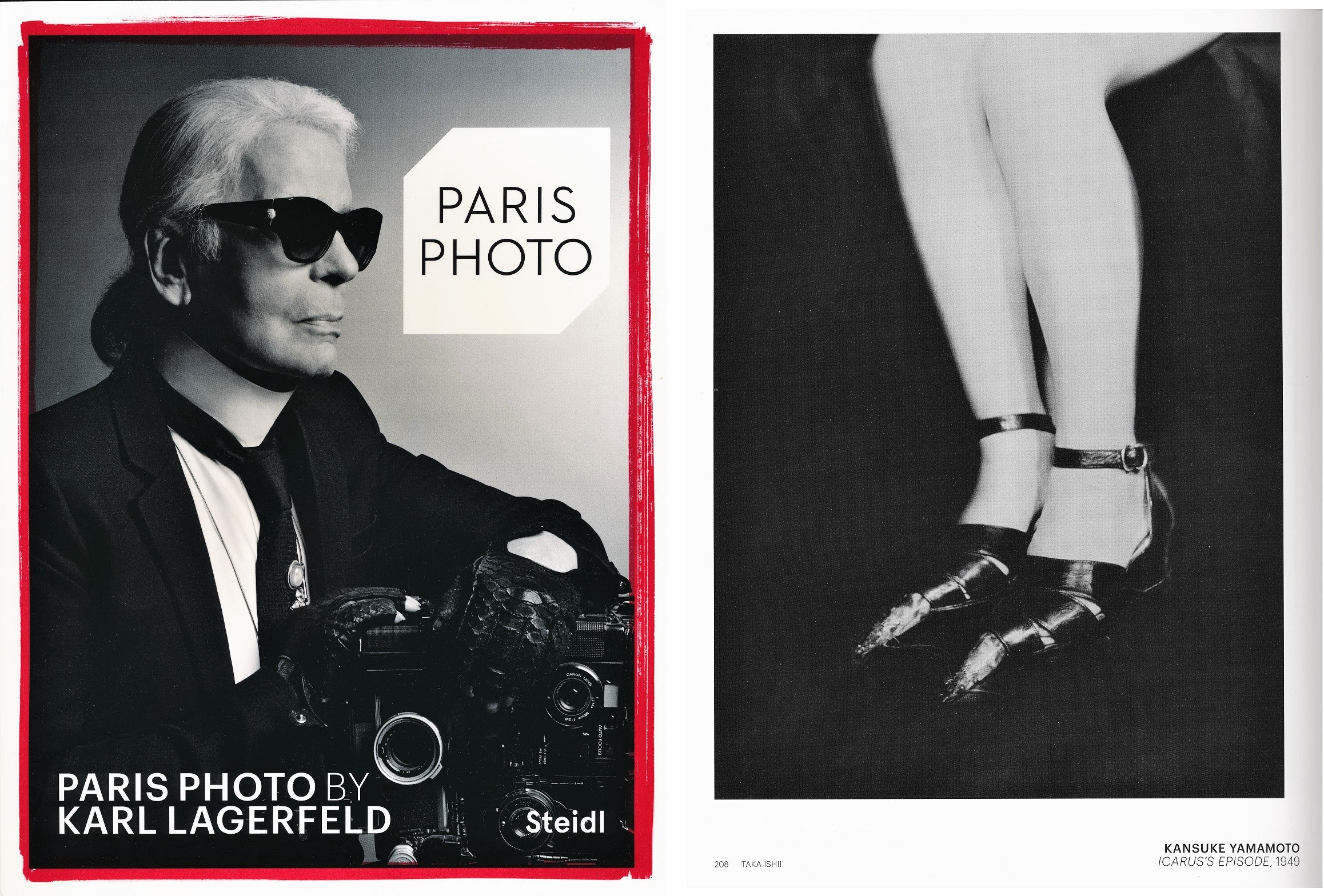
Work by KANSUKE YAMAMOTO. "Icarus's Episode," 1949, Collection of Museum of Modern Art (MoMA)

- 2019 Homage to the Bauhaus / Djanogly Gallery, Nottingham Lakeside Arts Centre, Nottingham, England, UK
- 2019 "Aichi Art Chronicle 1919-2019" /Aichi Prefectural Museum of Art, Nagoya, Aichi
- 2019 "Japanese Photography – 1930s - 1970s" / Mai 36 Galerie, Zurich, Switzerland
- 2019 Art Basel Hong Kong 2019
- 2021 "The Movement Of Modern Photography In Nagoya 1911-1972" / Nagoya City Art Museum, Japan
- 2021 "From the museum collection 2021: second period" / Aichi Prefectural Museum of Art
- 2021 "Surrealism Beyond Borders" / Metropolitan Museum of Art, New York
- 2022 "Surrealism Beyond Borders" / Tate Modern, London
- 2022 "Going Global: Abstract Art at Mid-Century" / Santa Barbara Museum of Art, Santa Barbara, California, United States.
- 2022 "Avant-Garde Rising: The Photographic Vanguard in Modern Japan" / Tokyo Metropolitan Museum of Photography, Japan
- 2022 Paris+ par Art Basel / Grand Palais, Paris, France
- 2023-'24 Surrealism and Japan / Museum of Kyoto, Itabashi Art Museum, Mie Prefectural Art Museum
- 2024 Foreign Exchange: Photography between Chicago, Japan, and Germany, 1920–1960 / Art Institute of Chicago, Chicago, USA
- 2024 Nagoya Modernism Poetry Exhibition II: From Modernism to Surrealism / Cultural Path Futaba Museum, Nagoya, Japan
- 2024 Paris Photo 2024 (Michael Hoppen Gallery booth)
- 2024-'25 KANSUKE YAMAMOTO / Michael Hoppen Gallery, London
- 2025 The Legacy of Avant-garde Photography in Nagoya, 1930s–50s Keiichiro Goto, Minoru Sakata, Minayoshi Takada, Tsugio Tajima, Yoshifumi Hattori, Kansuke Yamamoto 1930s–1950s, MEM, Tokyo
- 2025 BUTSUDORI :The Photographic Expression of "Object" / Shiga Museum of Art
- 2025-2026 "Enduring Visions: From Van Gough to Today" / Ulsan Art Museum, Korea
- 2025-2026 "Cut + Paste: Experimental Japanese Prints and Photographs" / National Museum of Asian Art, Smithsonian Institution, Washington, D.C., USA
- 2026–2027 The Surrealist Gaze / MB ART SALON, Tokyo, Japan. The exhibition featured Kansuke Yamamoto, Ikko Narahara, and Tomoo Gokita, with art direction and curation by Natane Takeda of plugin + and cooperation from Taka Ishii Gallery.
- 2026–2027 The Surrealist Book: Tomorrow Lives in Mirrors — Museum of Modern Art, New York, United States.
- 2026–2027 Myths and Monsters: The Art of Fantasy in Asia — M+, Hong Kong.

== Solo exhibition catalogues ==
- "YAMAMOTO Kansuke : Conveyor of the Impossible", John Solt and Kaneko Ryuichi, East Japan Railway Culture Foundation, 2001
- "YAMAMOTO KANSUKE" STEPHEN WIRTZ GALLERY SAN FRANCISCO 2006
- Japan's Modern Divide: The Photographs of Hiroshi Hamaya and Kansuke Yamamoto (2013); Edited by Judith Keller & Amanda Maddox, with contributions by Kotaro Iizawa, Ryuichi Kaneko, Jonathan Reynolds, John Solt; published by The J. Paul Getty Museum
- "Kansuke Yamamoto", Ryuichi Kaneko, Taka Ishii Gallery, 2017
- ''Kansuke Yamamoto''. Text by Lucy Fleming-Brown. London: Guiding Light, 2024. Michael Hoppen Gallery.

== Publications by Kansuke Yamamoto ==
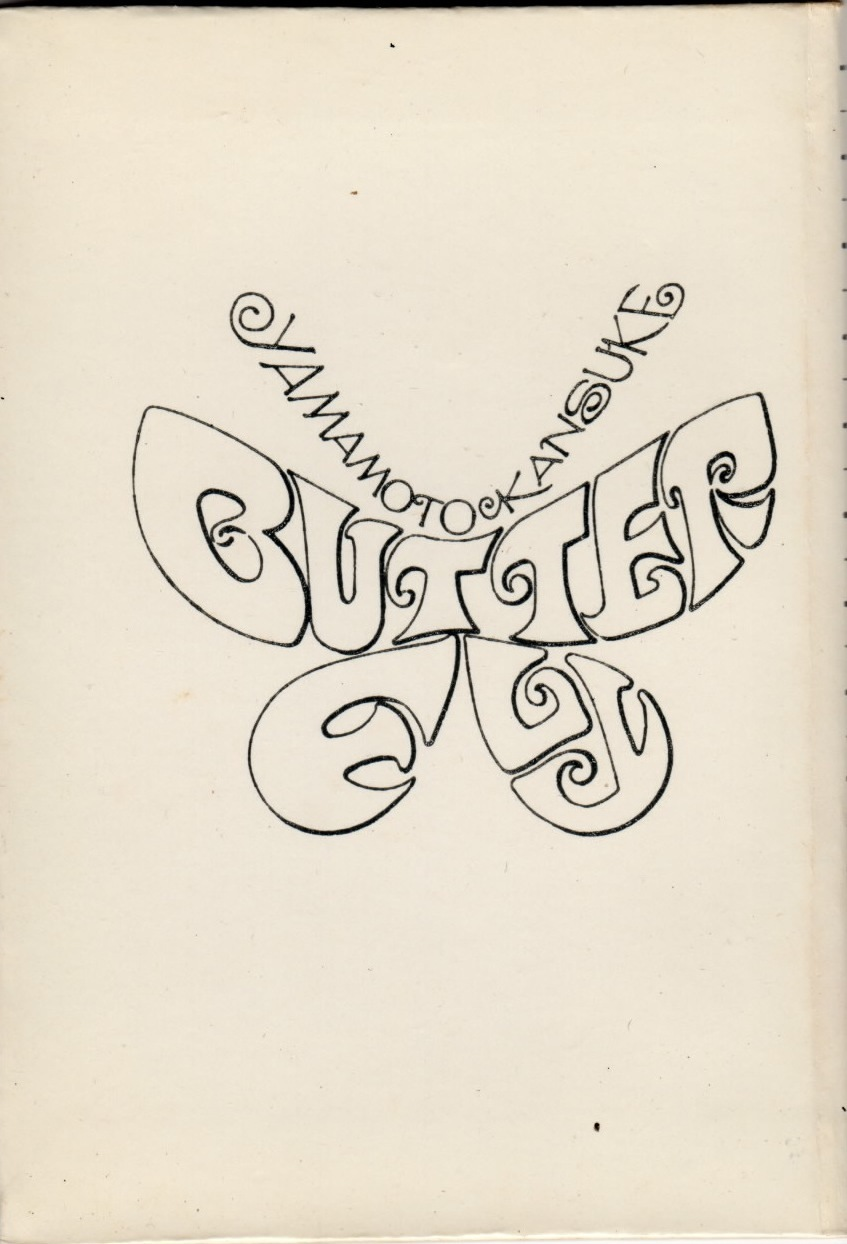
"Butterfly" 1970 Author: Kansuke Yamamoto

In 1970, he published Butterfly, described by Taka Ishii Gallery as his only book-length publication.

- Kansuke Yamamoto, "Yoru no Funsui", 1938–
- Kansuke Yamamoto, "Batafurai (Butterfly)", Nagoya Miniature Books Publishing, 1970

== Selected works ==
- The Developing Thought of a Human... Mist and Bedroom and, 1932, collage, and gelatin silver print. — Collection of Nagoya City Art Museum.
  - Kaneko describes the hand-colored photocollage as an emphatically constructed Surrealist operation on the print and a landmark in modern Japanese photography.
- My Thin-Aired Room, 1956, Gelatin silver print, 34.9 × 42.9 cm.
- My Thin-Aired Room, 1956, Gelatin silver print, 35.2 × 42.2 cm.
- My Thin-Aired Room, 1956, Gelatin silver print, 35.4 × 43 cm.
- My Thin-Aired Room, 1956, Gelatin silver print, 35.2 × 42.9 cm. — Collection of the J. Paul Getty Museum
  - Iizawa highlights the four-image "sequence" as a rare Japanese example of constructed serial narrative, made more than a decade before Duane Michals' late-1960s sequence works.
  - Maddox argues the suite structurally reworks Magritte's "vanishing figure" logic into a four-part narrative of progressive absence.
- Icarus's Episode, 1949, Gelatin silver print, 9 13/16 × 7 3/8" (24.9 × 18.7 cm) — held by the Museum of Modern Art (object no. 310.2025), listed as a 2025 acquisition.
- Buddhist Temple's Birdcage, 1940, Gelatin silver print, 25.7 × 17.9 cm. — shown in Surrealism Beyond Borders (The Met / Tate) and held by the Art Institute of Chicago.
- Variation of "Buddhist Temple's Birdcage", 1940, Gelatin silver print, 30.2 × 24.8 cm. Collection of Nagoya City Art Museum. — exhibited in Surrealism Beyond Borders (The Met / Tate) and held by the Nagoya City Art Museum.
- The Thrilling Game Related to Photography (1956) — presented in Tate's Shape of Light materials as an object-photograph incorporating glass (Jack Kirkland Collection loan).
- Untitled (sea egg/distant horizon), 1938, Gelatin silver print. Collection of National Museum of Asian Art, Smithsonian Institution — reviewing ''Drawing Surrealism'', Roberta Smith notes Yamamoto's works "combine drawing, collage and rephotography," framing them as inventive riffs rather than straightforward imitation.
- Sleepy Sea, 1953, gelatin silver print, 37.6 × 31 cm.
- Madam Q, 1950, Gelatin silver print on developing-out paper, 25.4×22.8 cm — Collection of the Tokyo Photographic Art Museum
  - Maddox calls it a "direct corollary" to Man Ray's La tête (1931), transformed through Yamamoto's graphic staging.
- View with a Ship Passing Through, 1940, Collage, 24.5 × 30.3 cm. Private collection.
  - Maddox emphasizes Yamamoto's physical cut-outs/apertures and reads its interval as resonant with the Japanese concept of ''ma''.
- Title Unknown (c. 1938), 25.2 × 17.7 cm. Collection of the Tokyo Photographic Art Museum — Solt cites Yamamoto's numbered public-bathhouse lockers as a key example of Surrealist technique applied to specifically Japanese subject matter.
- Title Unknown (1940), 24.4 × 29.6 cm — Solt likewise cites the "futon piled ten high" in a field as a vernacular Japanese Surrealist motif.
- Title Unknown (c. 1940), 28.0 × 22.3 cm — Solt cites the torn-paper shōji panels as another emblematic Japanese subject treated through Surrealist procedure.
- Reminiscence, 1953, gelatin silver print. Collection of Anne and David Ruderman.— A vintage print was reproduced as pl. 70 in the Getty Museum catalogue Japan's Modern Divide (2013). Sotheby's catalogue note interprets the burned, empty birdcage over a city view as evoking postwar devastation and the atomic aftermath, while suggesting a note of hope because no bird is trapped inside.
- A Forgotten Person, 1957, Kansuke Yamamoto, gelatin silver print. Collection of the J. Paul Getty Museum. — Masachika Tani discusses A Forgotten Person as a five-image sequence in which a female figure gradually changes and disappears.
- A Forgotten Person, 1958, Kansuke Yamamoto, chromogenic print, 46.2 × 33.0 cm. Collection of the J. Paul Getty Museum.
- Title Unknown (Hat with string), 1940 — held by the Getty; often situated within Surrealist vocabularies of displaced accessories in museum/survey framings.
- Title unknown, 1933, Kansuke Yamamoto, Gelatin silver print, 25.2 × 30.0 cm. Private collection.
- Buriru (BRILLE), 1938, Kansuke Yamamoto, gelatin silver print, 29.6 × 24.1 cm. Private collection; entrusted to the Tokyo Photographic Art Museum.
- Title unknown, 1938, Kansuke Yamamoto, Gelatin silver print, 18.7 × 24.5 cm. Collection of Gloria Katz and Willard Huyck.
- Title unknown, 1938, Kansuke Yamamoto, Gelatin silver print, 15.9 × 24.6 cm. Collection of Nagoya City Art Museum.
- Title unknown, 1939, Kansuke Yamamoto, Gelatin silver print, 24.4 × 29.6 cm.
- Untitled, ca. 1930s, Kansuke Yamamoto, Gelatin silver print, 43.8 × 36.2 cm. Collection of Daniel Greenberg and Susan Steinhauser.
- Self-Portrait, 1940, Kansuke Yamamoto, Gelatin silver print, 46. × 56.4 cm. Private collection.
- Title unknown, ca. 1940s, Kansuke Yamamoto, Gelatin silver print, 25.2 × 17.7 cm.
- Stapled Flesh, 1949, Kansuke Yamamoto, gelatin silver print, 31.1 × 24.8 cm. Collection of the National Museum of Asian Art, Smithsonian Institution.
- A Chronicle of Drifting, 1949, Kansuke Yamamoto, Collage, 30 × 24.8 cm. Collection of The J.P.Getty Museum.

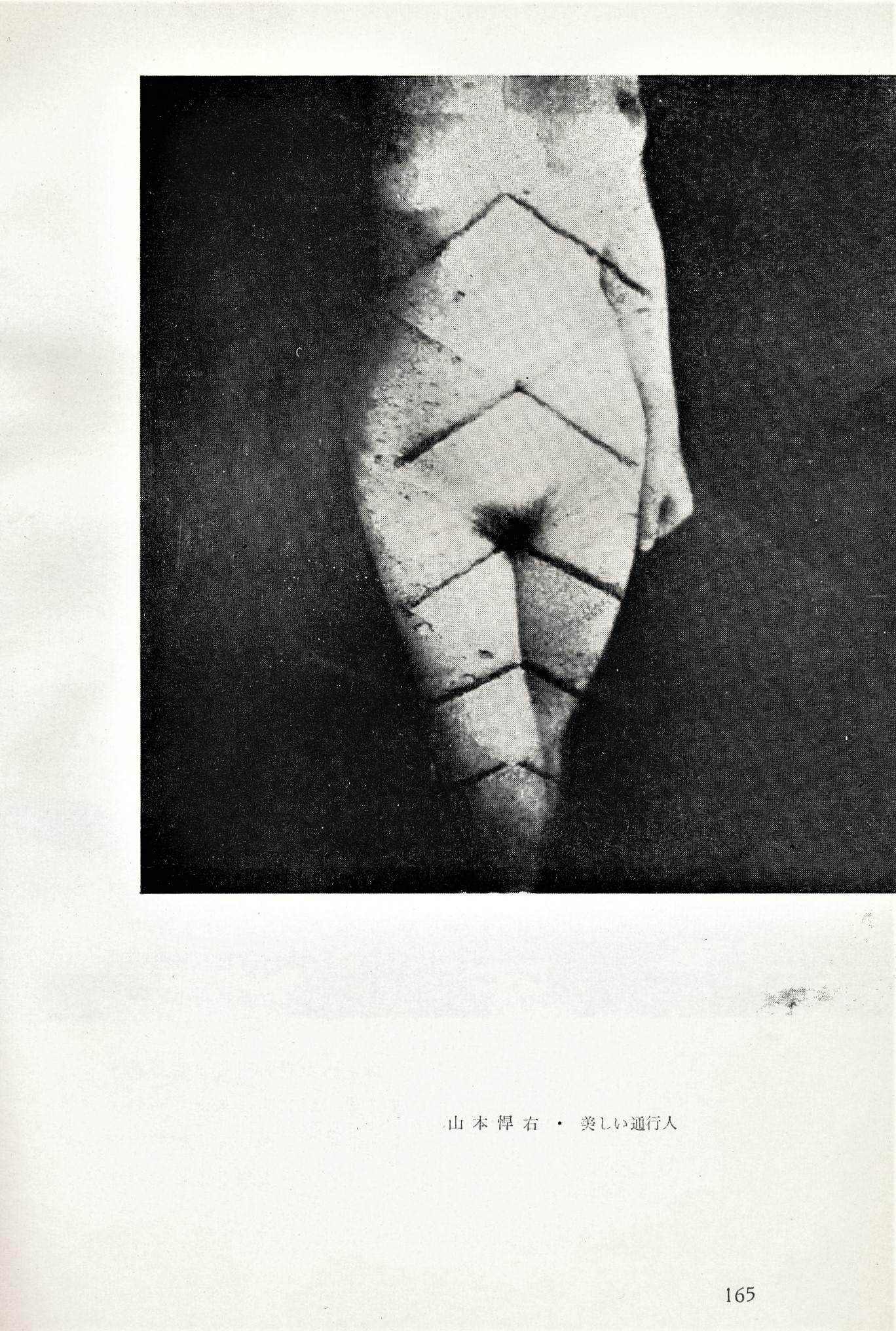
Beautiful Passerby 1956

- Self-Portrait, 1949, Kansuke Yamamoto, Gelatin silver print, 25.2 × 17.9 cm. Private collection.
- Scenery with Ocean, 1949, Kansuke Yamamoto, Gelatin silver print, 27.0 × 18.4 cm.
- Dream Passage, 1949, Kansuke Yamamoto, Gelatin silver print, 30.0 × 24.9 cm.
- Floating City, 1950, Kansuke Yamamoto, Gollage, 15.7 × 22.4 cm. Private collection.
- Isamu Noguchi, 1950, Kansuke Yamamoto, Gelatin silver print, 23.4 × 18.2 cm.
- Gorgeous Departure, 1950, Kansuke Yamamoto, 27.8 × 22.7 cm.
- Relaxation Season, 1953, Kansuke Yamamoto, Gelatin silver print, 27.5 × 22.9 cm. Private collection.
- Giving Birth to a Joke, 1956, Kansuke Yamamoto, Gelatin silver print, 42.5 × 55.6 cm. Private collection.
- Rose and Shovel, 1956, Kansuke Yamamoto, Gelatin silver print, 31.9 × 34.9 cm. Private collection.
- The Distance between the Landscape and the Dusk, 1956, Kansuke Yamamoto, Chromogenic print, 31.9 × 34.9 cm.
- Beautiful Passerby 1956, Kansuke Yamamoto, Chromogenic print
- The Man Who Went Too Far, 1956, Kansuke Yamamoto, Gelatin silver print.
- Cold Person, 1956, Kansuke Yamamoto, Gelatin silver print, 43.8 × 36.2 cm. Collection of Gloria Katz and Willard Huyck.
- From the series of "Obaku", 1956, Kansuke Yamamoto.
- The Origin of History, 1956, Kansuke Yamamoto, Chromogenic print, 52.5 × 47.8 cm.Collection of J. Paul Getty Museum.
- The Closed Room, 1958, Kansuke Yamamoto, Gelatin silver print, 35.9 × 45.0 cm.
- (The hard, cobalt desert...), 1958, Kansuke Yamamoto.
- My Bench, 1963, Kansuke Yamamoto.
- I'd Like to Think While in the Body of a Horse, 1964, Kansuke Yamamoto, Gelatin silver print, 22.7 × 18.1 cm. Collection of J. Paul Getty Museum.
- Suddenly in the Morning, 1968, Kansuke Yamamoto.
- Magnifying Glass, Rendezvous, 1970, Kansuke Yamamoto.
- Butterfly, 1970, Kansuke Yamamoto.
- The silver platter and the pigeon in the cage, / We suddenly have spring rain like typefaces today. / Cioran, / I may talk to you again someday, 1979, Kansuke Yamamoto.
- Under rose flowers of exploding black gunpowder / Girl flutters her braided hair running to the plaza / Dawn laughs out loud swaying its shoulders, 1983, Kansuke Yamamoto.

== Lineage ==
The Yamamoto family is said to trace its ancestry to Ōe no Sadaoku (died 1334), a chūnagon (middle counselor) who was exiled to Kire-no-shō in Mino Province in 1332, described as a descendant of Ōe no Otodo and Ōe no Hiromoto, when Emperor Go-Daigo's plot to overthrow the Kamakura shogunate was exposed and the emperor was banished to Oki Island. His descendants are said to have adopted the surname Yamamoto.

According to tradition, Yamamoto Kansuke(general), the military strategist of Takeda Shingen, was an eleventh-generation descendant of Sadaoku. He is said to have been the younger brother of Yamamoto Kazuma Sadamasa, a close retainer of Toki Yorinari, Governor of Mino Province, and the son of Yamamoto Kojirō Sadamitsu, who was reportedly adopted for a time by Fuwa Mitsuharu, lord of Kawaushi Castle.

Sadaoku's son, Ōe no Sadamoto—also known as Yamamoto Hangan Sakuramachi Chūnagon—is mentioned in the Taiheiki in connection with the Battle of Yoshino. Kire-no-shō is located in present-day Ibigawa, Gifu Prefecture, and the family is said to have lived there until the mid-Meiji period, up to the generation of Yamamoto's grandfather. Kansuke Yamamoto is described as the 25th head of the main Yamamoto line descending from Sadaoku.

== Bibliography ==
=== Exhibition catalogues ===
- "The Founding and Development of Modern Photography in Japan", Tokyo Metropolitan Museum of Photography, 1995
- "Surrealism in Japan", Nagoya City Art Museum, 1990
- "Avant-Garde Photography of Nagoya", Nagoya City Art Museum, 1989
- "Yamamoto Kansuke: Conveyor of the Impossible", John Solt and Kaneko Ryuichi, East Japan Railway Culture Foundation, 2001
- "The History of Japanese Photography", Anne Wilkes Tucker, Dana Frs-Hansen II, Dana Friis-Hansen, Kaneko Ryuichi, Takeba Joe, Kotaro Iizawa, Kinoshita Naoyuki, Yale University Press, 2003
- "Drawing Surrealism", Leslie Jones, Isabelle Dervaux, Susan Laxton, Prestel Pub, 2012
- Japan's Modern Divide: The Photographs of Hiroshi Hamaya and Kansuke Yamamoto (2013); Edited by Judith Keller & Amanda Maddox, with contributions by Kotaro Iizawa, Ryuichi Kaneko, Jonathan Reynolds; published by The J. Paul Getty Museum
- "Kansuke Yamamoto", Ryuichi Kaneko, Taka Ishii Gallery, 2017
- Surrealism Beyond Borders. New York: The Metropolitan Museum of Art; distributed by Yale University Press, 2021.
- ''Kansuke Yamamoto''. Text by Lucy Fleming-Brown. London: Guiding Light, 2024. Michael Hoppen Gallery.

=== Books ===
- Nagoya City Art Museum, Supervised by Hiroshi Kamiya and Minako Tsunoda, Edited by Kazuo Yamawaki, Toshihide Yoshida, Katsunori Fukaya, Satoshi Yamada, Joe Takeba, Minako Tsunoda, Akiko Harasawa and Yuko Ito, "Selected Works from the Collection of Nagoya City Art Museum", Nagoya City Art Museum, 1998
- Shigeichi Nagano, Kōtarō Iizawa, and Naoyuki Kinoshita, "Japanese Photographers Vol.15 Kiyoshi Koishi And Avant-garde Photographs", Iwanami Shoten, Publishers, 1999
- John Solt, Shredding the Tapestry of Meaning: The Poetry and Poetics of Kitasono Katue (1901–1978), Harvard University Press, 1999
- Tokyo Metropolitan Museum of Photography, "328 Outstanding Japanese Photographers", Tankosha, 2000
- John Solt（Translator: Tetsuya Taguchi）Edited by: Shūji Takashina, Takayuki Kojima, Ryōsuke Ōhashi, Yūko Tanaka, Noriko Hashimoto, 'On Kansuke Yamamoto', "The Aesthetics of Japan", Vol.35, Toei-sha，2002
- Kazumiki Chiba, ‘YAMAMOTO Kansuke : Conveyor of the Impossible',"Exhibition Catalogues in the Age of Cross – Cultural and Cross-Genre Studies", Edited by Eiko Imahashi, 2003
- Kotaro Iizawa, "From Eyes to Eyes, Walking Through Photo Exhibitions, 2001–2003", Misuzu Shobo, 2004
- Tetsuya Taguchi, "World of Kansuke Yamamoto, A World-class Photographer", Doshisha, 2005
- Satomi Fujimura, "An Introduction to the History of Photography, Section Two: CREATION, The Opening of Modern Age", Shinchosha, 2005
- Teruo Ishihara, "RAVINE – Poem & Prose Little Anthology", Silver Paper Pub. Kyoto, 2011
- Kotaro Iizawa, Nobuo Ina, John Szarkowski and Etsuro Ishihara, "The Tales of Syashin (the first volume)：Words by Japanese Photographers 1889–1989", aurastudio, 2012
- Kotaro Iizawa, "Deep Insight! 100 Super Masterpieces of Japanese Photographs", Pie Books, 2012
- Majella Munro, "Communicating Vessels: The Surrealist Movement in Japan 1925–70", Enzo Arts and Publishing Limited, 2012
- Nobuzo Kinoshita, "The Lives of Prodigy of Tokai", Edited by Shoko Komatsu, Fubaisha, 2013
- Melusine n.36, Editions L'Age d'Homme, 2016 Paris.
- PARIS PHOTO BY KARL LAGERFELD. Production and printing: Steidl, 2017
- 『Kansuke Yamamoto』 Photographs and texts. Published by : Fine-Art Photography Association Tokyo 2017
- Takeba, Jō (ed.). ''"Shashin no miyako" monogatari: Nagoya shashin undōshi 1911–1972'' (「「写真の都」物語 名古屋写真運動史 1911-1972」). Tokyo: Kokusho Kankōkai, 2021. ISBN 978-4-336-07198-9.

=== Articles ===
- Taylor Mignon, "A ‘subversive' finally brought in from the cold", The Japan Times, 15 August 2001
- John Solt, "Perception, Misperception, Nonperception", Milk Magazine, 2005
- REAR, 'Rediscovery:The History of Photograph of Nagoya', Rear, Vol.14, 2006
- Alissa J. Anderson, "Before and After the Bomb", Santa Barbara Independent, 1 February 2007
- Suzanne Muchnic, "At the Getty, a focus on Asian photographs", Los Angeles Times, 15 April 2009
- Roberta Smith, "Squiggles From the Id or Straight From the Brain", The New York Times, 24 January 2013
- Ánxel Grove, "Exhiben a Hamaya y Yamamoto, dos deslumbrantes fotógrafos japoneses de principios del XX", 20 minutos, 2013
- "Why Japanese Art Shows Are Taking Over New York Right Now", Vougue Japan. Feb. p. 281.
- Claire O'neill, "Japanese Photography: A Tale Of Two Artists", National Public Radio, 12 March 2013
- Marc Haefele, "PHOTOS: Realism meets Surrealism in Getty Japanese photography exhibit", Southern California Public Radio, 27 March 2013
- Richard B. Woodward, "The Realist and the Surrealist", The Wall Street Journal, 3 April 2013
- Meher McArthur, "Japan's Photographer Reflect the Realities of a Changing World", Southern California Cultural Journal, KCET, 18 April 2013
- Lauren Russell, "A surreal take on 20th-century Japan", CNN Photos – CNN.com blogs, 6 May 2013
- Danielle Sommer, "From Los Angeles: Japan's Modern Divide", Art Practical, 6 May 2013
- Bondo Wyszpolski, "Japan's Modern Divide: the Photographs of Hiroshi Hamaya and Kansuke Yamamoto", Easy Reader, 12 May 2013
- Catherine Wagley, "Japan's Modern Divide: the Photographs of Hiroshi Hamaya and Kansuke Yamamoto", photograph, 28 May 2013
- Smith, Douglas F., "Japan's Modern Divide: The Photographs of Hiroshi Hamaya and Kansuke Yamamoto", Library Journal;15 June 2013, Vol. 138 Issue 11, p88, 2013
- Leah Ollman, "2 Japanese photographers, 2 cultural camps at Getty Museum", Los Angeles Times, 22 June 2013
- Colin Pantall, "Japan's Modern Divide: the Photographs of Hiroshi Hamaya and Kansuke Yamamoto", photo-eye Blog, 18 July 2013
- Akiko Horiyama, "Salad Bowl: Surreal Japan", Mainichi Shimbun, 19 August 2013
- Eiko Aoki, "The Pacific Rim Divide of "Japan's Modern Divide", Trans-Asia Photography Review, Hampshire College, Volume 4, Issue 1: Archives, Fall 2013
- Eiko Aoki, "Behind the Folding Screen of "Japan's Modern Divide" An interview with the curators of the Getty Museum's Hiroshi Hamaya and Kansuke Yamamoto Photo Exhibit", Kyoto Journal, vol.79, 23 February 2014
- Montse Álvarez, "Con Kansuke Yamamoto en la penumbra de lo real", ABC Color, 11 May 2014
- David Belcher "A Prehistoric Sculpture Inspires a Tokyo Gallery". The New York Times., 2022-10-19

=== Television and Videos ===
- Sunday Museum(Nichiyo Bijutsukan), NHK
- SoCal Japan News Digest, 6 April 2013, UTB Hollywood

== See also ==
- History of photography/Japanese photographers
- List of Japanese photographers

== Sources ==
- YAMAMOTO Kansuke : Conveyor of the Impossible, John Solt and Kaneko Ryuichi, East Japan Railway Culture Foundation, 2001
- Japan's Modern Divide: The Photographs of Hiroshi Hamaya and Kansuke Yamamoto (2013); Edited by Judith Keller & Amanda Maddox, with contributions by Kotaro Iizawa, Ryuichi Kaneko, Jonathan Reynolds; published by The J. Paul Getty Museum
- Takeba, Jō (2021). 「写真の都」物語—名古屋写真運動史 1911-1972 (in Japanese). Kokusho Kankōkai. ISBN 978-4-336-07198-9. published by Nagoya City Art Museum
- Munro, Majella (2012). Communicating Vessels: The Surrealist Movement in Japan, 1923–1970. Cambridge: Enzo Arts and Publishing. pp. 193–200, 207. ISBN 978-1-909046-03-0.
  - A comprehensive study of the Japanese Surrealist movement, analyzing its political agency under the Special Higher Police (Tokkō) and its post-war reconstruction. The text provides specific documentation of Kansuke Yamamoto's resistance to state censorship, his theoretical writings on the conflict between Surrealism and Communism (1940), and his reintegration into the international Surrealist network via correspondence with figures such as André Breton and the reception of the journal BIEF in the 1950s.
