= Seikō Samizo =

Japanese photographer active in Osaka and Nagoya

- 佐溝勢光
- Known for: Photography
- Notable work: Spring Light; GO STOP; Autumn Wind
- Movement: Shinkō shashin; Avant-garde photography in Japan

Seikō Samizo (佐溝勢光, Samizo Seikō) was a Japanese photographer active in Osaka and Nagoya in the 1930s and early 1940s. He was associated with the Naniwa Photography Club, the Nagoya-based photography magazine Cameraman, and the circles around the Akebono Photography Club and Nagoya Photo Avant-Garde. A 1990 exhibition catalogue published by Nagoya City Art Museum identifies him as one of the founding members of Nagoya Photo Avant-Garde when the group was formed in February 1939 together with Minoru Sakata, Yoshio Shimozato, Chirū Yamanaka, Taizō Inagaki, Tsugio Tajima, and Kansuke Yamamoto. Documented works by Samizo include Spring Light (春光), GO STOP, Autumn Wind (秋の風), and two untitled photographs published in Cameraman in 1937.

== Early activity in Osaka ==
Samizo was active in Osaka photography circles by the early 1930s. A 1932 gelatin silver print by Gingo Hanawa is titled Mr. SAMIZO Seiko, Photographer, indicating that Samizo was already recognized as a photographer by that date. In the same year, the index to the December 1932 bulletin of the Naniwa Photography Club recorded Samizo's photograph Spring Light. Later accounts of Osaka photography also place him among the younger members who helped shift the club's style toward New Photography in the late 1920s and early 1930s.

== Move into Nagoya networks ==
Samizo's documented ties to Nagoya predated his later involvement in the city's 1930s photographic networks. A local history of Nagoya photography reproduces his photograph Piano from the third exhibition of the Aiyu Photography Club in 1920 and later identifies him as one of the club's members. By 1936 Samizo had entered photographic circles in Nagoya. According to a Nagoya City Art Museum account of photographer Benimura Kiyohiko, Samizo was one of the promoters of the Akebono Photography Club together with Benimura and Koashi Ryōnosuke in January 1936. This move positioned him within the regional exchange between Osaka's club culture and Nagoya's rapidly developing photography scene.

== Cameraman and published works ==
Samizo's work appeared in Cameraman from the magazine's earliest phase. Takeba's catalogue of reproduced works identifies his Autumn Wind as having been published in the magazine's inaugural issue in 1936. The same source also records two untitled photographs by Samizo in Cameraman no. 9 (1937). A further documented work, GO STOP (1931), was published in the photography magazine Camera.

== Nagoya Photo Avant-Garde ==
A 1990 Nagoya City Art Museum catalogue states that Nagoya Photo Avant-Garde was formed in February 1939 from the photography section of the Nagoya Avant-Garde Club, with Samizo among its founding members. In the same account, the new collective was formed around Sakata and Shimozato, together with Yamamoto, Tajima, Inagaki, Samizo, and the critic-poet Yamanaka. Samizo's inclusion places him within the same Nagoya network of critics, poets, and photographers in which Kansuke Yamamoto worked in the late 1930s.

== Position within Japanese avant-garde photography ==
Samizo's movement from Osaka club photography into Nagoya print and club networks places him within the broader development of interwar avant-garde photography in Japan. The Nagoya section of the exhibition catalogue Avant-Garde Rising: The Photographic Vanguard in Modern Japan describes the city's late-1930s avant-garde as a milieu formed through collaboration among critics, poets, and photographers and sustained through magazines such as Cameraman. In that sense, Samizo's career helps connect the Osaka-based new photography of the Naniwa Photography Club with the Nagoya milieu from which later Surrealist and object-based photography, including work by Kansuke Yamamoto, emerged.

== Later trace ==
Samizo's name continues to appear in Naniwa Photography Club materials in 1943. The index to a June 1943 issue records a memorial text under his name, showing that he remained an identifiable presence in club-related materials at that time.

== See also ==
- Kansuke Yamamoto (artist)
- Cameraman (Japanese magazine)
- Nagoya Photo Avant-Garde
- Photography in Nagoya
- Avant-garde photography in Japan
- Surrealism in Japan
