= Avant-Garde Rising: The Photographic Vanguard in Modern Japan =

2022 exhibition at the Tokyo Photographic Art Museum

- アヴァンガルド勃興 近代日本の前衛写真
- Country: Japan
- Location: Tokyo Photographic Art Museum, Tokyo
- Organiser: Tokyo Metropolitan Government, Tokyo Photographic Art Museum
- Followed by: topmuseum.jp/e/contents/exhibition/index-4281.html

Notes
- Exhibition dates: 20 May 2022 – 21 August 2022

Avant-Garde Rising: The Photographic Vanguard in Modern Japan was an exhibition held at the Tokyo Photographic Art Museum from 20 May to 21 August 2022. Organized by the Tokyo Metropolitan Government and the Tokyo Photographic Art Museum, it surveyed Japanese avant-garde photography of the 1930s and 1940s through a structure combining an introductory section on overseas photographers with regional sections on Osaka, Nagoya, Fukuoka, and Tokyo. The museum's official summary presented the movement as one shaped by imported Surrealist and abstract art, by collaborations among photographers, poets, painters, and designers, and by the wartime restrictions that eventually brought many of these activities to an end.

== Background ==
According to the exhibition's introductory text, avant-garde photography in modern Japan flourished in amateur photography groups nationwide in the 1930s and 1940s under the influence of Surrealist and abstract art introduced from abroad. The museum also noted that the period in which these photographers were actively presenting work was comparatively brief, and that the movement had therefore long received relatively little close examination. The exhibition was framed as part of a broader reappraisal, as research at museums throughout Japan progressed and exhibitions overseas drew renewed attention to such works.

The introductory text further emphasized that avant-garde photography in Japan was not confined to photographers alone. Poets and designers also participated, and the movement expanded across media and regions. In particular, the 1937 International Surrealist Exhibition was presented as a major catalyst, bringing many photographers into contact with Surrealism and encouraging painters to use photographs in pursuit of modes of expression not available in painting alone. The same text explicitly connected the exhibition to questions of freedom of expression under militarism, presenting the works as reminders of the breadth of creativity made possible by photography even under worsening wartime conditions.

== Exhibition structure ==
The exhibition was organized into five sections. Taken together, these sections presented Japanese avant-garde photography not as a single Tokyo-centered phenomenon but as a network of local groups, magazines, and exchanges that developed differently in Osaka, Nagoya, Fukuoka, and Tokyo.

=== Impact: contemporaneous photographers overseas ===
The first section examined how Japanese photographers encountered European avant-garde photography through magazines, photobooks, and touring exhibitions. The museum highlighted Japanese photography magazines such as Photo Times and Asahi Camera as important vehicles for introducing the work of overseas photographers including Eugène Atget, Man Ray, Hans Bellmer, Albert Renger-Patzsch, Cecil Beaton, and Brassaï. It also noted that such photographs were first shown in Japan more directly through exhibitions rather than magazines, including the 1931 Film und Foto exhibition and the 1937 International Surrealist Exhibition, both of which travelled beyond Tokyo to cities such as Osaka.

=== Osaka ===
The Osaka section treated the Kansai-centered spread of avant-garde photography through amateur photography clubs. The museum emphasized the importance of the Naniwa Photography Club, founded in Osaka in 1904, and described the shift of many of its 1930s members away from Pictorialism toward Shinkō shashin under the influence of newer photography from Europe and the United States. The section also highlighted the founding of the Tampei Photography Club in 1930, the role of Nakayama Iwata in the Ashiya Camera Club, and the later formation of the Avant-Garde Image Group by Terushichi Hirai and Kōrō Honjō after the impact of the 1937 Surrealist exhibition. In the museum's account, the flourishing of these groups drew attention to Kansai photographers as leaders of the avant-garde movement.

=== Nagoya ===
The Nagoya section focused on a collaborative milieu involving critics, poets, painters, and photographers. The museum's summary identified Chirū Yamanaka as a central figure in introducing Surrealism to Japan and stated that Yamanaka and the painter Yoshio Shimozato formed the Nagoya Avant-Garde Club, from which the photography section split off to become Nagoya Photo Avant-Garde, a group in which the poet Kansuke Yamamoto participated. The same summary described Minoru Sakata as the leader of the Nagoya photographic group and noted that Nagoya photographers developed and debated their theories in magazines such as Camera Art and Photo Times; it also identified the locally published coterie magazine Kameraman as a forum for roundtable discussions on avant-garde photography.

The catalogue essay by Jelena Stojković situated Nagoya within a national discursive network of "avant-garde photography" while also stressing the region's especially close interconnections between Surrealist poets, critics, painters, and photographers. In her account, the December 1938 Nagoya roundtable later printed in Kameraman showed local photographers and critics debating "avant-garde" photography through a hybrid of abstraction, Surrealism, natural objects, and everyday scenery. Stojković also described the subsequent development of Nagoya Photo Avant-Garde in relation to the worsening political climate, including the pressure that led clubs in Tokyo and Nagoya to adopt less conspicuously "avant-garde" names in 1939. Within the exhibition as a whole, the Nagoya section thus placed Yamamoto within a regional Surrealist network shaped by collaboration, publication, and wartime pressure rather than as an isolated individual case.

=== Fukuoka ===
The Fukuoka section examined Société IRF, an avant-garde art group active in Fukuoka from 1939 to 1940. The museum explained that the group explored Surrealism and abstraction and that, unlike some other local groups, not all of its members were photographers. It also noted that, although the group was formed later than other regional avant-garde groups, several of its members had already been exhibiting by the late 1920s and were active beyond Fukuoka itself.

=== Tokyo ===
The Tokyo section addressed the Avant-Garde Photography Association, founded in 1938 by Shūzō Takiguchi, Nagata Isshū, and Narahara Hiroshi with backing from Photo Times. The museum described Takiguchi as the association's spiritual leader and emphasized the role of magazines in promoting photograms, photomontages, and other forms of avant-garde photographic expression in Tokyo. It further noted that the association's members included Abe Yoshifumi (Nobuya), Imai Shigeru, Hiroshi Hamaya, Nishio Susumu, and Tanaka Masao, as well as several painters, and that related activity extended to other groups such as those around Ei-Q and Kōshirō Onchi. The museum also connected these developments to the later wartime transformation of Photo Times into Hodoshashin, after which avant-garde photography quickly disappeared from its pages.

== Selected artists and works ==
The exhibition included both Japanese avant-garde photographers and European photographers shown in the first section. Artists named on the museum's English exhibition page include Man Ray, Eugène Atget, Hans Bellmer, Albert Renger-Patzsch, Cecil Beaton, and Brassaï in the first section; Nakayama Iwata, Murata Yonetaro, Nakaji Yasui, Kōno Tōru, Kiyoji Koishi, Amano Ryūichi, Hirai Terushichi, Tarui Yoshio, Kōrō Honjō, Osamu Shiihara, Tabuchi Kaneyoshi, Yoshifumi Hattori, Yano Toshinobu, Meison Kobayashi, Otono Sutezō, and Kanbei Hanaya in the Osaka section; Minoru Sakata, Tsugio Tajima, Kansuke Yamamoto, and Keiichirō Gotō in the Nagoya section; Takahashi Wataru, Hisano Hisashi, Konomi Giichirō, Tanaka Zentoku, Yoshizaki Hitori, and Itō Kenshi in the Fukuoka section; and Nagata Isshū, Kōshirō Onchi, Ei-Q, and Hiroshi Hamaya in the Tokyo section.

Representative works illustrated on the exhibition page included Atget's During a Solar Eclipse (1912), Man Ray's Calla Lilies (c. 1930), Kiyoshi Koishi's Fatigue from the series Drunken Dream (1936), Hirai Terushichi's Fantasies of the Moon (1938), Keiichirō Gotō's The Last Judgement (1935–40), an untitled work by Yamamoto from about 1935, the group photograph IRF on the Run (1939), Hisano Hisashi's Display Window of Sea Life (1938), Ei-Q's Photo Dessin (1939), and Nagata Isshū's Fire mountain (1939). The catalogue entries for the Nagoya section also included five works by Yamamoto, dated from 1932 to 1940, among them The Developing Thought of a Human... Mist and Bedroom and (1932) and several untitled works from the mid-1930s and 1940.

== Catalogue ==
An official exhibition catalogue edited by the Tokyo Photographic Art Museum was published by Kokusho Kankokai in 2022 under the Japanese title アヴァンガルド勃興 近代日本の前衛写真. The publisher describes it as the official catalogue of the exhibition, with a page count of 208 and ISBN 978-4-336-07367-9. According to the publisher's contents listing, the volume includes the five exhibition chapters, essays by Jelena Stojković and Fujimura Satomi, artist notes, a chronology related to avant-garde photography, and a list of works.

Stojković's catalogue essay, Avant-Garde Photography in 1930s Japan, in Discourse and Practice, positioned the movement between discourse and practice and traced its formation from the impact of the 1931 Film und Foto exhibition and the 1937 International Surrealist Exhibition to its suppression and renaming under wartime conditions. Fujimura's essay, The Age of Avant-garde Photography, emphasized the regional spread of the movement, the role of amateur clubs and magazines, and the way some of its practitioners carried avant-garde experimentation into the postwar period, including the later emergence of the Japan Subjectivist Photography League.

== Significance ==
The museum presented the exhibition as a survey of a short-lived but nationally distributed movement that linked photographers with poets, critics, painters, and designers in multiple regions of Japan. Its summary stressed both the increasing scholarly attention to the field and the way wartime restrictions brought regional avant-garde activities to an end. The exhibition therefore provided an institutional framework for viewing Japanese avant-garde photography not only through Tokyo but also through regional networks in Osaka, Nagoya, Fukuoka, and Tokyo.

Within that framework, the Nagoya material was distinctive in presenting avant-garde photography through a collaborative environment in which criticism, poetry, painting, and photographic practice intersected. By placing Yamamoto in a section structured around Yamanaka, Shimozato, Sakata, magazines, clubs, and wartime pressure, the exhibition offered a museum-level context for understanding his work in relation to a broader regional Surrealist network rather than solely as an individual career. In this respect, the exhibition helped frame Japanese avant-garde photography as a multi-sited field shaped by translation, publishing, local group activity, and political constraint.

== Reception ==
In an artscape review, Kōtarō Iizawa situated the exhibition within a recent series of exhibitions on Japanese photography of the 1930s and 1940s, citing earlier shows in Fukuoka and Nagoya as well as the Tokyo Photographic Art Museum's 2018 exhibition Koga and New Photography: The Origins and Development of Modernist Photography in Japan. He described the exhibition as a rare opportunity to see substantial bodies of work by Japanese avant-garde photographers together with photographs by contemporaneous European figures that helped shape the movement. At the same time, he argued that the exhibition remained somewhat broad and introductory in character, partly because of its short preparation period, and suggested that a more comprehensive framework extending from Shinkō shashin to postwar subjective photography would still be needed.

== See also ==
- Tokyo Photographic Art Museum
- Nagoya Photo Avant-Garde
- Nagoya Avant-Garde Club
- Surrealism in Japan
- Avant-garde photography in Japan
- Photography in Nagoya
- Surrealism Beyond Borders
- Japan's Modern Divide: The Photographs of Hiroshi Hamaya and Kansuke Yamamoto
