= Nagoya Avant-Garde Club =

Japanese avant-garde arts collective in Nagoya (est. 1937)

- ナゴヤアバンガルドクラブ
- Formation: November 17, 1937
- Founder: Chirū Yamanaka; Yoshio Shimozato
- Dissolved: 1941
- Type: Arts collective
- Location: Nagoya, Japan
- Subsidiaries: Nagoya Photo Avant-Garde

The Nagoya Avant-Garde Club (ナゴヤアバンガルドクラブ) was a short-lived prewar arts collective in Nagoya, Japan, active from late 1937 to around 1939. Museum accounts describe it as an interdisciplinary avant-garde circle in the city, organized around the critic–poet Chirū Yamanaka (山中散生) and the painter Yoshio Shimozato (下郷羊雄). Its photography section became the nucleus of the independent collective Nagoya Photo Avant-Garde in 1939, in which the poet-photographer Kansuke Yamamoto participated.

== History ==
=== Formation ===
According to research published by the Aichi Prefectural Museum of Art, the club was founded on 17 November 1937, following the touring exhibition Kaigai Chōgenjitsushugi Sakuhinten (Exhibition of Overseas Surrealist Works), which was shown in Nagoya earlier that year. The same research, and a 1990 exhibition catalogue edited by the Nagoya City Art Museum, describe the touring exhibition as a catalyst that stimulated local interest in Surrealism and avant-garde experimentation and brought Nagoya's Surrealist activity to a peak in 1937.

The 1990 catalogue frames Nagoya as a major regional base for Japanese Surrealism in the late 1930s, centered on the painter Yoshio Shimozato (下郷羊雄) and the critic-poet Chirū Yamanaka (山中散生). The catalogue traces the start of this local movement to the relationship that developed between Shimozato and Yamanaka after Shimozato's solo exhibition in September 1935. In October 1935 Shimozato was accepted as a new member of the Shinzōkei Bijutsu Kyōkai (新造型美術協会), and Yamanaka joined its journal Shinzōkei (新造型) from issue no. 2 (January 1936) as an art critic. A Shinzōkei Nagoya exhibition in June 1936 is described as the first occasion on which Japanese Surrealist painting was introduced to Nagoya's art world. The catalogue also notes that Shimozato began collecting overseas Surrealist publications around this time, and that his studio attracted younger artists and functioned as a Surrealist salon in the city. It reports that artists such as Tetsu Okada (岡田徹), Togawa Kaneo (戸川金雄), and Yoshikawa Sanshin (吉川三伸) formed the group "Avant-Garde" (アバンガルド) and held monthly group exhibitions, before establishing the Surrealist drawing group Torupi (トルピ) in January 1937 with Shimozato as its leader. In the catalogue's account, the Nagoya Avant-Garde Club is presented as a cross-disciplinary group formed for "pure research and presentation" across artistic fields.

The same catalogue lists 13 founding members, consisting of Yamanaka as an art critic, Shimozato and nine other painters (Okada, Togawa, Yoshikawa, Noboru Oguchi (大口登), Tatsuo Imai (今井達雄), Shigeaki Ikai (猪飼重明), Kaoru Ando (安藤かをる), Shizumu Suzuki (鈴木鎮), and Kazuyuki Mitsuzaki (光崎一之), and two photographers, Minoru Sakata (坂田稔) and Seikō Samizo(佐溝勢光). It further states that the club mounted its first exhibition in June 1938, at which four additional participants joined: three painters (Matsuoka Yoshikazu (松岡美一), Fukuhara Takeo (福原武夫), and Shiraki Shoichi (白木正一) and the poet Funabashi Seiji (船橋清治). The catalogue notes that an organ bulletin titled Nagoya Avant-Garde Club (「ナゴヤアバンガルドクラブ」) was issued in conjunction with the first exhibition, and that the member list printed there also includes Yasuo Yoshida (吉田泰雄), Shiro Ota (太田士郎), and Aketoshi Yoshikawa (吉川明敏). The 1990 catalogue reproduces excerpts from issue no. 1 (June 1938), including texts attributed to members such as Yoshikawa, Okada, and Togawa. It also states that the Nagoya Avant-Garde Club held only the first exhibition and issued only the first bulletin before splitting and dissolving in April 1939. The catalogue attributes the split directly to Shimozato's shift toward avant-garde photography and the formation of the photography collective Nagoya Photo Avant-Garde in 1939. In the same narrative, the catalogue links the wider end of Nagoya's Surrealist milieu to the 1941 crackdown associated with the "Surrealism incident", noting arrests of Yoshikawa and Funabashi and a police search of Okada's home.

=== Photography section and the Nagoya Photo Avant-Garde ===
Museum research published by the Aichi Prefectural Museum of Art notes that a photography section became active from the summer of 1938, with photographers including Minoru Sakata (坂田稔), Taizō Inagaki (稲垣泰造), and Tsugio Tajima (田島二男) participating in meetings and discussions. The same research characterizes these activities as part of a local circuit in which discussions circulated through photography magazines and other publishing in and beyond Nagoya. The same museum account notes that Sakata also developed his photographic theory in magazines such as Photo Times and Camera Art, linking the club's photography section to wider print forums for avant-garde photography beyond Nagoya. A later reconstruction of the milieu describes how Sakata convened a follow-up "avant-garde photography reappraisal" roundtable in Nagoya in late 1938, with its proceedings introduced in the local amateur photography magazine Cameraman (カメラマン). In that account, the term "Nagoya Photo Avant-Garde" is in use by the time Cameraman no. 29 appeared in February 1939. On 17 February 1939, the photography section became independent and began operating as the Nagoya Photo Avant-Garde (ナゴヤ・フォトアバンガルド).

Photo historian Ryūichi Kaneko has emphasized Yamamoto's importance within Nagoya's prewar photo-avant-garde, writing that Sakata described Kansuke Yamamoto as a "poet of silver bromide" (臭化銀の詩人). In later accounts of the Nagoya photo-avant-garde milieu, Yamamoto joined the Nagoya Photo Avant-Garde in 1939, but withdrew later that year. One narrative of the period adds that by the end of 1939 Sakata dissolved the Nagoya Photo Avant-Garde and re-established the Nagoya Photography Culture Association (名古屋写真文化協会), and that Yamamoto broke with Sakata as he pursued his own Surrealist-identified practice thereafter. After leaving the Nagoya Photo Avant-Garde, Yamamoto remained active through Seidōsha, which later issued the bulletin Carnet Bleu.

=== Wartime context ===
By 1941, intensifying wartime censorship and police surveillance had begun to affect several figures associated with the Nagoya Avant-Garde Club and its aftermath. A 1990 exhibition catalogue edited by the Nagoya City Art Museum connects the collapse of the club's wider Surrealist milieu to the 1941 crackdown often referred to as the "Surrealism incident", noting the detention of Sanshin Yoshikawa and Funabashi Seiji and a police search of Tetsu Okada's home.

Kariya City Art Museum states that, when the crackdown unfolded on suspicion of violations of the Peace Preservation Law, Yoshikawa was detained by the Special Higher Police, his works and materials were confiscated, and he was released in 1942 without indictment. Nagoya Gallery likewise states that he was held for about ten months at the Tokkō section of Nagoya's Egawa police station. A museum account for Okada similarly states that in 1941 his home was searched by the Special Higher Police and that most of the works in his studio were confiscated.

The same wartime climate also bore on the photographic milieu that developed from the club. The Getty Museum states that Kansuke Yamamoto helped establish Nagoya Photo Avant-Garde and published the Surrealist journal Yoru no Funsui in 1938 and 1939, but ceased publication after the Tokkō expressed concern about its contents. Eiko Aoki writes that Yamamoto joined Nagoya Photo Avant-Garde in February 1939, but as soon as the group changed its name, fearing tight government censorship, to Nagoya Shashin Bunka Kyōkai (Nagoya Photography Culture Association), he severed ties with it. Taka Ishii Gallery likewise states that Nagoya Photo Avant-Garde dissolved in 1941 after changing its name to Nagoya Shashin Bunka Kyōkai.

Taken together, these accounts suggest that the wartime impact on the club's orbit was not uniform: for some members and associates it meant detention and confiscation, while for others it involved intensified surveillance, the curtailment of publication, organizational renaming, and eventual dissolution.

== Legacy ==
Although short-lived, the club is cited in museum narratives as part of a wider surge of Japanese avant-garde photography and Surrealism-related activity in the late 1930s, in which Nagoya functioned as a significant regional center alongside Tokyo and Kansai.

== See also ==
- Nagoya Photo Avant-Garde
- Kansuke Yamamoto (artist)
- Chirū Yamanaka
- Photography in Nagoya
- Kaigai Chōgenjitsushugi Sakuhinten
- Surrealism
- Surrealism in Japan
- Surrealism in Nagoya
- Shinkō shashin
- Zen'ei shashin
- Surrealist photography in Japan
