= Mesemu zoku =

1940 Japanese Surrealist photobook edited by Yoshio Shimozato

- Editor: Yoshio Shimozato
- Author: Various
- Original title: メセム属 : 超現実主義写真集
- Language: Japanese; French
- Subject: Surrealist photography
- Genre: Photobook
- Publisher: Yoshio Shimozato
- Publication date: 1940
- Publication place: Nagoya, Japan
- Media type: Print (spiral-bound)
- Pages: 1 volume (unpaginated)

Mesemu zoku (メセム属; Mesemb, 20 photographies surréalistes) was a 1940 Japanese photobook edited by Yoshio Shimozato in Nagoya. Produced in the milieu of Nagoya Photo Avant-Garde, it brought together photographs by Shimozato, Minoru Sakata, Taizō Inagaki, and Tsugio Tajima, together with images by specialist collectors of Mesembryanthemaceae cacti. The volume has been described as the most important product of the Nagoya group and as a notable example of Surrealist photography in wartime Japan.

Developed through daily collaboration between January and March 1939 and published the following year, the book was conceived as a bilingual object, opening from both sides and carrying separate Japanese and French title pages. Its photographs of cacti and related succulent plants combine close-up views, collage effects, black backgrounds, and abrupt changes of scale, producing imagery that has been described as erotic, anthropomorphic, and Surrealist in character.

The volume appeared during a period of mounting wartime pressure on artistic expression in Japan. Scholarship has situated it within the shift from zen'ei shashin (avant-garde photography) to the more publicly acceptable discourse of zōkei (plastic or formative photography), through which photographers in Nagoya sought to preserve experimental practice under conditions of censorship and official scrutiny. In that sense, Mesemu zoku has been discussed not only as a Surrealist photobook, but also as a document of how the Nagoya avant-garde negotiated public survival on the eve of the Pacific War.

== Publication history and physical description ==
Mesemu zoku was published in 1940 in Nagoya and is credited to Shimozato as editor and author. The National Diet Library records it as a one-volume publication issued by Shimozato in 1940, with no pagination and a height of 19 cm.

Copies survive in institutional collections including the British Museum and the Nagoya City Art Museum. The British Museum describes the work as a first-edition spiral-bound photobook with twenty-one photographic plates and notes that its copy is no. 159 of a limited edition of 200 copies. Art Platform Japan records the work as a 1940 publication in ink, paper, and metal, with spiral-ring binding, and gives its dimensions as 18.3 × 12.9 × 0.8 cm.

Although physically modest, the volume has been treated in scholarship as a photobook rather than a simple album of plant studies. Its double opening, bilingual structure, and integration of explanatory text into the object are central to its interpretation.

== Historical background ==
Mesemu zoku emerged from the Surrealist and avant-garde photographic culture that developed in Nagoya in the later 1930s, especially after the 1937 exhibition Kaigai Chōgenjitsushugi Sakuhinten (Exhibition of Overseas Surrealist Works). In the wake of that exhibition, Nagoya became one of the most active local centers for Surrealist photography in Japan, with poets, critics, painters, and photographers working across overlapping circles.

In December 1938, photographers in Nagoya including Sakata, Shimozato, and Chirū Yamanaka took part in a discussion on avant-garde photography that was transcribed in the February 1939 issue of the locally issued magazine Kameraman. In that discussion, the Nagoya photographers identified a hybrid of abstraction, Surrealism, natural objects, and everyday scenery as central to the Surrealist imagination.

As Japan moved deeper into wartime mobilization, the political climate narrowed the space for experimental work. In 1939 the police banned the Surrealist journal Yoru no Funsui, and the Nagoya Avant-Garde Club was dismantled. A photographic offshoot of the club nevertheless continued as Nagoya Photo Avant-Garde, reflecting Shimozato's shift of focus from painting to photography. In 1940, in order to allay official scrutiny, the group changed its name to Nagoya Shashin Bunka Kyōkai (Nagoya Photography Culture Association), before being dissolved the following year.

Within this increasingly restrictive context, Mesemu zoku became the principal Surrealist photobook to emerge from the Nagoya group. Rather than standing outside the crisis of the period, the volume was produced within it and bears the marks of the group's attempt to sustain avant-garde photography under pressure.

== Structure and contributors ==
According to Jelena Stojković, the album was developed through daily collaboration between January and March 1939. The project was conceived by Shimozato together with Sakata and was expanded through the participation of Inagaki and Tajima, as well as the cactus collectors Sano Sueo and Satō Yasuhira, whose photographs were included in the volume.

The inclusion of specialist collectors gave the book a quasi-scientific dimension that Shimozato explicitly acknowledged in the explanatory notes. This scientific register did not displace the book's Surrealist ambitions; rather, it formed part of the tension through which natural specimens were transformed into charged visual objects.

The book opens from both sides and carries separate title pages in Japanese and French. In Japanese it is titled 『メセム属 超現実主義写真集』, while in French it is titled Mesemb, 20 photographies surréalistes. Stojković notes that the French-reading half consists of ten numbered photographs, all by Shimozato, while the Japanese-reading half contains another ten images by the project's collaborators, labelled alphabetically from A to J. Between the two sequences lies a central section containing Latin plant names, explanatory notes, a postscript, and publication details.

The structure therefore makes the book legible at once as a bilingual publication, a collaborative album, and a carefully staged Surrealist object.

== Themes and imagery ==
The photographs in Mesemu zoku focus on cacti and related succulents, but they do not present them as neutral botanical specimens. Instead, the plants are rendered through close-up views, dramatic framing, black backgrounds, montage, and abrupt manipulations of scale, all of which detach them from ordinary descriptive photography.

The opening image on the French-reading side, titled The Door, presents a Mesemb cactus placed on a doorknob, introducing the volume as a passage into what Stojković describes as a "bewitching world". Later images include collaged and displaced cacti that appear to float above domestic architecture or expand into unstable, almost animate presences.

Critics have repeatedly emphasized the erotic and anthropomorphic force of these images. Surrealism Beyond Borders states that the photographs endow the plants with an "anthropomorphic sexuality", indicating that eroticism was a potent aspect of the Nagoya group's Surrealist thinking. Stojković likewise stresses that many of the close-ups derive their effect from mimetic resemblance to genitalia, creating a tension between scientific display and libidinal suggestion.

For that reason, Mesemu zoku has been interpreted not simply as a study of natural forms but as a Surrealist exploration of the object world, in which the plant becomes a vehicle for displacement, desire, and the animation of the everyday.

== Censorship, renaming, and the shift to zōkei ==
The publication of Mesemu zoku coincided with a broader transition in Japanese photography from the language of zen'ei shashin (avant-garde photography) to that of zōkei shashin (plastic or formative photography). In Stojković's account, this shift did not represent a simple aesthetic refinement. Rather, it formed part of the means by which photographers preserved a public space for experimentation at a moment when explicitly avant-garde activity had become more vulnerable to repression.

Stojković argues that Mesemu zoku had initially been tied to a more openly Surrealist initiative that she terms "Neo-Surrealism". In that formulation, the transgressive character of sexuality was expected to provide a collective bond between the work and its viewers and thereby to help renew a Surrealist front among younger artists in Japan. That ambition, however, was overtaken by the rapid tightening of the political climate in 1939, even while the album was being prepared for print.

In a postscript dated October 1939, Shimozato explained that the volume had originally been conceived in a larger format and that difficulties encountered during publication had made revision necessary. He also wrote that he and the artists associated with him had shifted away from an earlier "sharp angle" toward a more direct expression of "plasticity", and that the contents of the book no longer entirely corresponded to their present state of mind.

This statement has become central to later scholarship on the book. Stojković interprets it as evidence that the substitution of plasticity for avant-garde helped make the volume publishable, even as it marked the failure of a more explicit collective Surrealist front under wartime conditions. Mesemu zoku has therefore been treated not only as a Surrealist photobook, but also as a key document of censorship avoidance and discursive adaptation in late-1930s Japanese photography.

== Parallel wartime trajectories in Nagoya ==
Mesemu zoku can also be read alongside other wartime trajectories in Nagoya's Surrealist photography. While the book represented a collective strategy for sustaining experimental photography within the orbit of Nagoya Photo-Avant-Garde, Kansuke Yamamoto appears in the strongest secondary sources to have separated from Sakata and the group by late 1939 and to have continued on a more independent path.

One important point of comparison is Yamamoto's paired 1940 work Buddhist Temple's Birdcage (Garan no torikago), published together with the poem Garan no densetsu in the second issue of Kōkaku. In the two related images, a disconnected telephone receiver appears first inside and then outside a birdcage. Stojković situates the works in relation to contemporary debates on the Surrealist object, and within a broader transnational field that included the circulation in Japan of Salvador Dalí's late-1930s telephone-receiver imagery.

A contemporaneous response survives in the July 1940 issue of Foto taimusu, where Sakata introduced three of Yamamoto's works, including Garan no torikago, and described Yamamoto's attitude toward photography as that of "a poet of silver bromide". Yamamoto returned to the disconnected telephone receiver in Landscape (Fūkei), published in VOU in October 1940.

Another divergence was editorial rather than photographic. According to Getty scholarship, Yamamoto remained active through the photography group Seidōsha, and from March 1941 the group issued the small newsletter Carnet Bleu. Maddox describes Carnet Bleu as only four pages long and closer to a pamphlet than to a conventional magazine; its fifth and final issue, dated August 10, 1942, included Yamamoto's Japanese translation of Philippe Soupault's essay "État de la photographie". Read in relation to Mesemu zoku, these works and publications suggest that wartime Surrealist photography in Nagoya did not follow a single route but branched into both collective and more autonomous forms of continuation.

== Legacy ==
In later scholarship, Mesemu zoku has come to occupy an important place in accounts of Japanese Surrealist photography. It is treated both as the major photobook produced by the Nagoya group and as a revealing case of how avant-garde photographers negotiated the final phase of prewar cultural repression in Japan.

Its importance also extends beyond local or national history. Because the book links Surrealist photography to bilingual publishing, collaborative authorship, erotic object imagery, and wartime adaptation, it has become relevant to broader efforts to reframe Surrealism as a transnational network rather than a history centered exclusively on Paris.

== See also ==
- Nagoya Photo Avant-Garde
- Nagoya Avant-Garde Club
- Yoshio Shimozato
- Kansuke Yamamoto (artist)
- Buddhist Temple's Birdcage
- Carnet Bleu
- Surrealism in Japan
- Surrealist photography in Japan
