= Surrealism in Nagoya =

In the Japanese city of Nagoya, Surrealism developed as a distinctive regional formation within Japanese Surrealism, especially from the mid-1930s to the early 1940s. In Nagoya, surrealist activity took shape across poetry, criticism, photography, small-scale publishing, camera clubs, and exhibition culture rather than through a single medium or institution. Recent scholarship has identified the city as one of the liveliest centres of Surrealist activity in Japan during the late 1930s, emphasizing the roles of figures such as Chirū Yamanaka, Yoshio Shimozato, Minoru Sakata, and Kansuke Yamamoto in building a local milieu that connected artistic experiment with magazines, camera clubs, and exhibition networks.

A major catalyst for surrealist activity in the city was the 1937 Kaigai Chōgenjitsushugi Sakuhinten (Exhibition of Foreign Surrealist Works), which was shown at the Maruzen Gallery in Nagoya after touring Tokyo, Kyoto, and Osaka. The exhibition helped stimulate the formation and reorganization of groups operating under the more publicly acceptable label of the "avant-garde", including the Nagoya Avant-Garde Club at the end of 1937. The city's surrealist activity was especially notable for the degree to which photography, photographic criticism, and little-magazine publishing became central to its development, including periodicals such as Yoru no Funsui.

At the same time, Nagoya's surrealist milieu developed under increasing political pressure. In the late 1930s and early 1940s, censorship, police scrutiny, and wartime mobilization narrowed the conditions under which artists and photographers could publish, exhibit, or organize. In 1939, the police banned Yamamoto's surrealist journal Yoru no Funsui; the Nagoya Avant-Garde Club was dismantled; and its photographic offshoot, the Nagoya Photo Avant-Garde, later changed its name in 1940 to allay official scrutiny before being dissolved in 1941. Because of this trajectory, Nagoya has become a key regional case for understanding Surrealism in Japan under wartime censorship and surveillance.

== Background and local conditions ==
Nagoya's later surrealist activity did not arise in isolation but grew out of a local environment in which photography, literary experiment, and small-scale artistic association were already active before 1937. Some of the photo clubs formed in Nagoya in the early 1910s embraced modernist tendencies in the following decades, and the city's photographic scene remained linked both to Kansai networks and to local literary circles by the 1930s.

In this longer history, the Aiyū Photography Club—formed in Nagoya in January 1912—provided one important institutional precedent. Later accounts note that Kansuke Yamamoto's father Gorō Yamamoto cofounded the club and ran a photography supply shop and studio that functioned as a nexus for the regional photography community.

That local infrastructure shaped the younger generation from which Nagoya's surrealist milieu would emerge. Around 1930 Yamamoto began writing poetry and became acquainted with Chirū Yamanaka, whose magazine Ciné was one of the local vehicles through which Surrealist poetry circulated in Nagoya. In October 1931, Yamamoto became a founding member of the Dokuritsu Shashin Kenkyūkai (Independent Photography Research Association), organized by Mitsuya Okonogi. Later accounts identify several members as former Aiyū photographers and describe the group as a break from the limitations of Pictorialism toward more experimental forms of photographic expression. The association published the journal Dokuritsu as a forum for exchanging ideas and presenting members' works. In 1935, Yamamoto and Okonogi established the A.B.C. Photo Club, which held meetings at Gorō Yamamoto's photo supply shop.

Nagoya's importance also depended on its ability to connect local activity with wider regional and international currents. A developing interest in photography among Surrealist poets and critics was reinforced by local magazines and by the movement of photographers across western Japan. The city became the backdrop for the formation of the Nagoya Foto Guruppe (Nagoya Photo Group), established in 1934 in a Kodak supply shop recently opened by Minoru Sakata, who had relocated from Osaka while maintaining ties to Kansai photography circles. Alongside Sakata, the main figures in this pre-1937 milieu included Yamanaka, active as a poet and translator, and Yoshio Shimozato, a painter who hosted a Surrealist salon in his studio. By the mid-1930s, Nagoya already offered a setting in which photographic practice, criticism, translation, and collaborative publishing could converge before the better-known clubs of the late 1930s emerged.

Taken together, these conditions show that before 1937 Nagoya already combined photo-club culture, photographic supply and circulation networks, Surrealist poetry magazines, translation, salon-based exchange, and links to Kansai, making it not simply a later venue for Surrealism but one of the places in Japan where the local conditions for a distinct surrealist milieu had already begun to form.

== The 1937 Exhibition and the formation of a local milieu ==
The presentation of Kaigai Chōgenjitsushugi Sakuhin ten at Nagoya's Maruzen Gallery in July 1937 is generally treated as the decisive public catalyst for surrealist activity in the city. The exhibition reached Nagoya after touring Tokyo, Kyoto, and Osaka.

It has also been read as the realization of efforts by the critic-poet Shūzō Takiguchi to initiate a new phase of surrealist practice in Japan, even though the exhibition's international realization depended heavily on the contacts fostered by Chirū Yamanaka.

Stojkovic notes that the exhibition presented most works through photographic reproduction rather than original objects. Because of that mode of display, the exhibition had an especially strong impact on photographic culture and intensified discussion about the relation between Surrealism and the "avant-garde" in public discourse.

In Nagoya, as elsewhere in Japan, the exhibition encouraged the reorganization of existing circles and the formation of new collectives under the more publicly acceptable label of the "avant-garde". Accounts of the Nagoya milieu connect this moment to the formation of the Nagoya Avant-Garde Club at the end of 1937.

== Nagoya Avant-Garde Club ==
The Nagoya Avant-Garde Club, formed at the end of 1937, brought together painters, poets, and photographers and gave local surrealist activity in Nagoya a more visible collective form. Rather than functioning as a narrowly defined artistic school, the club operated as a loose interdisciplinary milieu in which surrealist and abstract tendencies coexisted under the broader label of the "avant-garde". Accounts of the club consistently emphasize Chirū Yamanaka and Yoshio Shimozato as central organizers of this milieu. The same accounts identify Kansuke Yamamoto as one of the leading figures among those already working in a distinct surrealist mode in Nagoya by the late 1930s. In this sense, the club gave a collective public form to a local constellation that had already linked poetry, painting, and photography before the better-known wartime pressures of the following years.

It also formed part of the immediate background to the later emergence of the Nagoya Photo Avant-Garde, which gave a more specifically photographic form to tendencies already visible within the club's milieu.

== Photography, magazines, and debate ==
One of the most distinctive features of surrealism in Nagoya was the central place occupied by photography and photographic criticism.

After the 1937 exhibition, local photographers participated in broader debates about zen'ei shashin (avant-garde photography). In Nagoya, however, those debates developed in especially close contact with surrealist poets, translators, and critics rather than within a purely photographic sphere.

The discussion held in December 1938 and later published in the February 1939 issue of Kameraman is often cited as a key document of this local formation. In that round-table, Minoru Sakata, Yoshio Shimozato, and Chirū Yamanaka treated surrealist photography not simply as a branch of shinkō shashin but as a field in which abstraction, constructed imagery, natural objects, and everyday scenery could all contribute to surrealist imagination.

The discussion also shows that photography in Nagoya was being theorized in direct relation to surrealist poetry and criticism rather than as an isolated technical genre. This photographic discourse was sustained by local print culture as well as by discussion circles and exhibitions.

Later scholarship has emphasized that projects such as Mesemu zoku formed part of the infrastructure through which Nagoya's photographers and poets tested, circulated, and materialized surrealist ideas.

Taken together, these debates and publications made Nagoya one of the clearest sites in Japan where photography, criticism, and magazine culture converged within a regional surrealist network.

== Yoru no Funsui and small-scale publishing ==
Publishing was central to the Nagoya milieu, and the city's surrealist activity cannot be understood through exhibitions and clubs alone. Yamamoto launched Yoru no Funsui on 11 November 1938, and the fourth and final issue appeared on 20 October 1939.

The journal brought together translations of French Surrealist poetry, poems by Yamamoto, and drawings by Yoshio Shimozato, giving Nagoya's surrealist circle a compact format for literary and artistic reproduction. With the help of Yamanaka, the journal reached Paul Éluard in France and represented an attempt to continue dialogue between Surrealists in Europe and Japan from Nagoya.

As later scholarship has emphasized, such publications were not marginal to the movement but formed part of the infrastructure through which surrealist ideas circulated locally and through which Nagoya's participants maintained contact with wider networks of poets, critics, and artists. The short life of Yoru no Funsui also illustrates how small-scale publishing in Nagoya functioned at once as a vehicle for surrealist exchange and as a vulnerable point of contact with wartime censorship and police scrutiny.

== Wartime pressure, renaming, and dissolution ==
The development of surrealism in Nagoya was sharply constrained by the worsening political climate of the late 1930s and early 1940s, and studies of the city consistently place police scrutiny, censorship, and wartime discipline at the centre of this history rather than at its margins.

In 1939, the police banned Yoru no Funsui, the Nagoya Avant-Garde Club was dismantled, and Kansuke Yamamoto was interrogated by the Thought Police. Even after that rupture, local photographic activity continued for a time through the Nagoya Photo Avant-Garde, which was founded in 1939. In 1940, the group changed its name to the Nagoya Photography Culture Association in order to reduce official suspicion. The association was dissolved in 1941 as wartime controls intensified.

Yamamoto nevertheless remained active through Seidōsha, for which he edited the newsletter Carnet Bleu, first issued in March 1941.

Taken together, this sequence of suppression, adaptation, and dissolution has made Nagoya one of the clearest documented regional cases through which surrealist activity in Japan can be understood under wartime censorship and surveillance.

== Postwar continuities and afterlives ==
Although Nagoya's prewar surrealist circles were dismantled under wartime pressure, their concerns did not disappear after 1945 but re-emerged in new photographic and publishing formations. In 1947, Kansuke Yamamoto formed the photography group VIVI with Keiichirō Gotō, Minayoshi Takada, Yoshifumi Hattori, and others. Later accounts describe VIVI as the first postwar photographic collective in Nagoya. VIVI held its first exhibition in Nagoya in 1948. Yamamoto's work was included in the group's second exhibition at Maruzen Gallery in Nagoya in 1949.

Yamamoto also continued to publish work in the magazine VOU, which later accounts treat as one of the postwar contexts in which his surrealist and avant-garde practice remained visible beyond Nagoya alone. In the 1950s, however, prewar avant-garde photography was increasingly overshadowed by the dominance of postwar realism. The notion of "subjective photography", associated in Japan with the reception of Otto Steinert, created one of the few postwar frameworks through which earlier avant-garde photographers could be regrouped. In 1956, Yamamoto joined the formation of the Japan Subjective Photography League, a short-lived formation that briefly reconnected prewar experimental photographers with a younger postwar generation. The First International Subjective Photography Exhibition later that year showed photographers such as Yamamoto alongside younger figures including Kiyoji Ōtsuji, Ikkō Narahara, and Yasuhiro Ishimoto.

Taken together, these postwar continuities show that Nagoya's surrealist milieu did not simply vanish with wartime repression but survived in altered form through local collectives, magazine culture, and later attempts to reposition prewar avant-garde photography within postwar Japanese photography.

== Legacy and historiography ==
Nagoya's importance within Japanese surrealism became clearer only through later reconstruction by scholars, curators, and exhibition catalogues. Because many works were lost, dispersed, or remained little known after the war, the local movement was long overshadowed in broader accounts of modern Japanese art.

Since the 1980s, however, museum and scholarly work, including exhibitions and catalogues associated with the Nagoya City Art Museum and curator Jō Takeba, has increasingly recovered the roles of Nagoya's poets, photographers, clubs, and magazines within interwar Japanese surrealism. In that historiography, Nagoya has come to stand not only for a regional chapter in Japanese surrealism but also for a particularly revealing case of surrealist activity shaped by local networks, photographic circulation, and wartime censorship and surveillance.

== See also ==
- Surrealism in Japan
- Nagoya Avant-Garde Club
- Nagoya Photo Avant-Garde
- Yoru no Funsui
- Kaigai Chōgenjitsushugi Sakuhinten
- Seidōsha
