= Photography in Nagoya =

Photography in Nagoya surveys the history of photographic practice and culture in Nagoya (in Aichi Prefecture), including commercial studios, amateur clubs, and art-photography alongside related print and publishing cultures. In movement histories of Japanese photography, Nagoya has been characterized as a major regional center whose photographic infrastructure expanded rapidly in the early twentieth century, with a dense landscape of studios and a growing trade in cameras, film, and darkroom services. A frequently cited touchstone is Chōtarō Hidaka's 1911 call to make the city a "shashin no miyako!! Nagoya" ("photographic capital!! Nagoya"), a phrase later adopted as the title for overviews of the city's photographic movement history.

Early art-photography in Nagoya is often anchored in Hidaka's work and in the activities of the Aiyū Photo Club, which helped establish high-level pictorialist printing and exhibition practices in the city. Hidaka's circle also overlapped with local photographic-materials merchants; a later chronology notes that Gorō Yamamoto's Yamamoto Gorō Shoten was an early photographic-equipment business in Nagoya and that Gorō served as a founding member (and later a representative) of the Aiyū Photo Club. Interwar and wartime avant-garde currents are represented in Nagoya by the poet-photographer Kansuke Yamamoto, whose Surrealist-inspired photographs, collages, and writings formed a notable strand of Japanese modernism. Postwar photography from Nagoya is exemplified by Shōmei Tōmatsu (born in Nagoya in 1930), widely treated as a key figure in Japanese postwar photography.

In the Metropolitan Museum of Art and Tate catalogue Surrealism Beyond Borders, Stephanie D'Alessandro and Matthew Gale write that Surrealism "enlivened and enriched" the activities of amateur photo clubs in Nagoya (and Osaka) in the 1930s. Building on museum-based research, recent histories emphasize Nagoya's photographic culture as an interconnected set of studios, supply shops, clubs, magazines and other small print venues, and exhibitions, rather than as a sequence of isolated individual careers.

== Early art photography and pictorialism (1910s–1920s) ==
Early twentieth-century art photography in Nagoya is often narrated through the activities of photographer Chōtarō Hidaka and the amateur circle Aiyū Photo Club (Aiyū Shashin Kurabu). In a 1911 text later quoted by Takeba, Hidaka called for an "influential photographic association" ("yūryoku naru shashin dantai") in Nagoya and urged that the city become a "photographic capital" ("shashin no miyako"). Okado states that Hidaka approached photographer Shiei Sano and that the group began in January 1912 as Aiyū Photo Club, initially with around ten members. Founding members included Hidaka, Sano, and Gorō Yamamoto—the father of avant-garde photographer-poet Kansuke Yamamoto—who operated a photographic equipment and materials shop in Nagoya's Sakae district that functioned as a local base for photography.

Okado describes Aiyū as maintaining itself through member contributions rather than sponsorship from photographic-materials shops, while organising annual exhibitions alongside meetings and publications. In the 1910s and 1920s, the club's aesthetic aligned with Pictorialism, favouring painterly pigment processes, especially gum printing (gum bichromate), which Okado notes was prominent because the club's leading members were skilled in the method. Takeba notes that Hidaka's phrase about making Nagoya a "shashin no miyako" was later reused as a framing device in accounts of the city's modern photography movement, including as the source for the title of his own survey. A works list in Takeba's survey identifies early prints and negatives by Hidaka and other first-generation members from the 1910s–1920s, including material held by or deposited with the Nagoya City Art Museum. Okado records that Hidaka died in 1926 and that senior members such as Sano and Yoshisuke Yokoi gradually left the club thereafter.

== From pictorialism to modernism (late 1920s–1930s) ==
Histories of photography in Nagoya describe the late 1920s and 1930s as a transition from club-centered pictorialist "art photography" toward modernist approaches associated with the emergence of shinkō shashin ("New Photography"). Takeba frames this shift as a conscious move beyond the pictorialist standards associated with the Aiyū Photo Club, arguing that the club’s prominence helped shape the local field while also making it difficult for a distinct "next generation" of expression to emerge until photographers defined themselves in opposition to it. He also notes that Nagoya had a substantial commercial and technical base by 1930, listing 61 photography-related businesses in the city directory as part of the background against which modernist practices developed. In this environment, local print culture became a forum for debate, including the Nagoya coterie magazine Cameraman, launched in October 1936 by Cameraman Inc. and known for organizing roundtable discussions that reexamined avant-garde photography. Takeba emphasizes that surviving runs of the magazine are fragmentary and that gaps in basic bibliographic information complicate efforts to reconstruct the period’s networks in detail.

One figure associated with Nagoya’s early-1930s independent activity is the poet and photographer Kansuke Yamamoto, who began making photographs in 1931 and co-founded Dokuritsu Shashin Kenkyūkai (Independent Photography Research Association) in Nagoya. Aoki notes that the group published the magazine Dokuritsu, underscoring how small magazines and discussion circles functioned as practical infrastructure for Nagoya’s modernist turn in this period. These developments provide a bridge from the city’s earlier pictorialist club culture to the more explicitly Surrealist and avant-garde experimentation that followed later in the 1930s.

== Surrealism and avant-garde networks (1930s–early 1940s) ==
Museum overviews of prewar "avant-garde photography" in Japan describe Nagoya's scene as developing through collaboration among critics, poets, and photographers rather than through a single medium-specific group alone. In TOPMUSEUM's Nagoya chapter, the critic-poet Chirū Yamanaka and the painter Yoshio Shimozato are presented as forming the cross-disciplinary Nagoya Avant-Garde Club, from which the photography section later split off as Nagoya Photo Avant-Garde. Art Platform Japan likewise characterizes the Nagoya Avant-Garde Club as a Nagoya-based collective active across painting, photography, and poetry from 1937.

TOPMUSEUM identifies photographer-theorist Minoru Sakata as the leader of the Nagoya grouping and notes that, after earlier ties to the Osaka-based Naniwa Photography Club, he led the formation of the Nagoya Photo Gruppe in 1934. The same account places the group's development in an ecology of photography periodicals, stating that debates over photographic theory unfolded in magazines including Camera Art (launched in 1935 by Camera Art Inc.) and Photo Times. TOPMUSEUM also highlights the Nagoya coterie magazine Cameraman (launched in 1936 by Cameraman Inc.) as a forum that organized roundtable discussions to "reexamine" avant-garde photography.

Another figure linking Osaka and Nagoya was Seikō Samizo, who had earlier been active in the Naniwa Photography Club, helped promote the Akebono Photography Club in Nagoya in 1936, published work in the Nagoya magazine Cameraman, and was later listed among the founding members of Nagoya Photo Avant-Garde.

In 1937, Nagoya was among the tour venues for the exhibition Kaigai Chōgenjitsushugi Sakuhinten, which artscape describes as presenting European Surrealist works and related materials to Japanese audiences before continuing to other cities through July. TOPMUSEUM further emphasizes interregional exchange by noting that participants in the Nagoya network visited Fukuoka and influenced members of Sociêtê Irf, framing the period as circulation between local scenes rather than a one-way flow of ideas into Nagoya.

Within this 1930s infrastructure, TOPMUSEUM presents Nagoya Photo Avant-Garde (formed from the club's photography section in 1939) as a node where experimental practice and theory were articulated in print, and it lists the Nagoya chapter through figures including Sakata, Tsugio Tajima, poet-photographer Kansuke Yamamoto, and Keiichirō Gotō. One Surrealist-leaning publication associated with this milieu is the photobook Mesemu zoku: Cho-genjitsushugi shashin shu (1940), produced by Shimozato and preserved in institutional collections including the Nagoya City Art Museum and the British Museum. TOPMUSEUM's framing of Nagoya as a cross-disciplinary network also situates Yamamoto's participation in 1939 as one example within a broader local infrastructure of clubs, magazines, and debate.

== Wartime constraints and reconfiguration (1940s) ==
As Japan moved into full wartime mobilization in the early 1940s, photographic activity operated under tighter surveillance and shrinking publication and exhibition opportunities that affected regional scenes as well as Tokyo and Osaka. In its survey of prewar avant-garde photography, TOPMUSEUM notes that wartime magazine consolidation forced the magazine Photo Times to change its name to Hodoshashin ("Photo journalism") in 1941, after which avant-garde photography quickly disappeared from its pages. Because Nagoya-based photographers had used national photography periodicals such as Photo Times (alongside magazines like Camera Art) as venues for theory and debate, the narrowing of print outlets changed how experimental work could circulate and be discussed. Writing about the prewar period, Eiko Aoki reports that the label "avant-garde" itself drew suspicion as censorship tightened, and that the Nagoya Photo Avant-Garde dropped the term and used the name Nagoya Shashin Bunka Kyokai ("Nagoya Photography Culture Association").

Aoki also records that poet-photographer Kansuke Yamamoto recalled police questioning and stated that he was released on the condition that he cease publication of Yoru no Funsui, a frequently cited example of the pressures placed on Surrealist-leaning print culture as the war intensified. A curriculum vitae published by Taka Ishii Gallery states that the group (after the name change) dissolved in 1941, indicating how short-lived formal avant-garde organizing could be under wartime conditions. The Metropolitan Museum of Art and Tate catalogue Surrealism Beyond Borders frames late-1930s Japan within a broader "Under Pressure" narrative in which Surrealist groups and publications faced surveillance and suppression, providing an international-canon context for understanding why Japanese Surrealist-associated networks (including photography circles) contracted and adapted as war approached and began. In a 1972 bibliographic note on prewar Nagoya coterie magazines, Kinoshita Shinzō likewise attributes the abrupt shrinkage of local small-circulation publishing to militarization, censorship, and paper shortages, and records both an announced-but-unissued title (Brille, 1940) and the short run of Carnet Bleu (1941-1942), issued by Seidōsha.

== Postwar Nagoya (1950s–1960s) ==
Movement histories of Nagoya photography describe the postwar field as a reconfiguration in which "objective" documentary/realist impulses and more overtly constructed or "subjective" approaches were debated side by side, rather than yielding a single dominant style. One early postwar marker of renewed experimental activity was the formation of the Nagoya-area collective VIVI (VIVI-sha) in 1947, which Art Platform Japan dates to ca. 1950 as an active period. A museum survey account of Nagoya’s modern photography frames late-1940s to 1950s works by figures such as Keiichirō Gotō, Minayoshi Takada, and Yoshifumi Hattori within this postwar context of tension between realism and "subjectivist" photography in the region. The same institutional record lists the small bulletin CARNET DE VIVI (no. 1, printed June 1948) as part of the period’s documentary trace, indicating how photographs and short programmatic texts circulated in limited, locally produced print formats. One institutional expression of these "subjectivist" tendencies was the Japan Subjective Photography League, founded in May 1956; Nagoya-linked photographers including Keiichirō Gotō joined the league, while Kansuke Yamamoto participated in its formation and also exhibited in the First International Subjective Photography Exhibition later that year.

Alongside these experimental circles, postwar Nagoya photography is also represented in realist-oriented work that focused on everyday life and local environments, including gelatin silver prints by Kaoru Usui from 1951 now held by the Nagoya City Art Museum. Takeba’s overview of the city’s movement history treats this postwar moment as one in which renewed abstract/Surrealist expression and the rise of realism should be read as parallel strands within Nagoya’s photographic culture, rather than as a simple succession of styles. Museum surveys of the same regional field also include early-1950s photographs by Shōmei Tōmatsu (born in Nagoya), positioning his initial work in the area as part of a broader local postwar scene rather than an isolated breakthrough narrative. Taken together, these sources frame postwar Nagoya photography through the interaction of makers, small publications, and institutional collecting that linked local production to national debates over realism and subjectivity.

== Student movements and collective practice (1960s–early 1970s) ==
Commentary on the Nagoya City Art Museum's 2021 exhibition history described Nagoya's postwar student scene as shaped in part by Shōmei Tōmatsu's "Chubu Student Photography Association", with some participants linking to the Japanese student movement of the 1960s. In Takeba Jō's movement history of Nagoya photography, the Chūbu Student Photography Federation (中部学生写真連盟) is treated as a central case for the broader student photography movement, which he notes reached a peak around 1968. Takeba writes that Tōmatsu founded the federation and served as a mentor for students involved in the organization.

The federation circulated its activities through newsletters and small publications, including the high-school division periodical Photo Opinion (No. 1, February 1967). Takeba also discusses the All-Japan Student Photography Federation bulletin Young Eyes as part of this movement's print infrastructure and as a locus for campaign and circle activities.

One example of collective production highlighted in Takeba's account is the high school photo-club project Osu (大須), researched for four months beginning in December 1968 and shown as a 24-work exhibition in April 1969, accompanied by a photobook. The same chapter records that student photographers documented clashes with riot police on Hirokōji-dōri on 21 October 1969 (International Anti-War Day). In an illustration list for this period, Takeba reproduces a set of five prints by Kansuke Yamamoto titled Asa, totsuzen ni ("Suddenly, in the Morning", 1968) alongside student works and federation materials. Takeba organizes the discussion around the federation's publications, collective shooting actions, and a shift described as "from movement to struggle" as the early 1970s approached.

== Institutions, collections, and historiography ==
Nagoya City Art Museum opened in 1988 and has positioned photography as an important medium within its collection and exhibition program, alongside other modern and contemporary art. The museum also states that it has mounted many photography exhibitions and systematically acquired works, including holdings related to the history of photography in Nagoya. Research and public interpretation have been supported by the museum's publications, including its annual reports and the newsletter Art Paper (Artpaper), which publishes curatorial columns and exhibition reviews as well as other museum news. A recent example of this research-oriented framing is the 2021 special exhibition "Shashin no miyako" monogatari: Nagoya shashin undōshi 1911-1972, presented as a survey of the city's photographic movement history.

Local museum scholarship has been taken up in national survey projects, including TOPMUSEUM's overview Avant-Garde Rising, which presents Nagoya as a distinct regional chapter within a multi-center history of prewar Japanese avant-garde photography. International exhibition catalogues have likewise treated Nagoya's photo-club infrastructure as part of broader modernist and Surrealist histories, and the Met/Tate catalogue Surrealism Beyond Borders includes a section titled "Osaka and Nagoya photo clubs" that situates Nagoya within transregional networks of magazines, clubs, and exhibitions in late-1930s Japan. Complementing these catalogue narratives, the National Center for Art Research administers the Art Platform Japan research portal and its Japanese Museum Collections Search (SHŪZŌ) database, which aggregates museum collection records across Japan and supports cross-institutional research and reuse of collection information.

== See also ==
- Photography in Japan
- Aiyu Photography Club
- Nagoya Photo Avant-Garde
- Nagoya Avant-Garde Club
- Nagoya City Art Museum
- Gorō Yamamoto
- Kansuke Yamamoto
- Shōmei Tōmatsu
- Avant-garde photography in Japan
- Shinkō shashin
- Zen'ei shashin
- Surrealism in Japan
- Surrealist photography in Japan
- Photomontage
- Photogram
