= Yoshio Shimozato =

Japanese painter and photographer associated with Surrealism in Nagoya

- 下郷 羊雄
- Born: December 8, 1907; Aichi Prefecture, Japan
- Died: April 6, 1981 (aged 73)
- Occupations: Painter; photographer
- Known for: Co-founding the Nagoya Avant-Garde Club; Association with Nagoya Photo Avant-Garde; Mesemu zoku
- Movement: Surrealism

Yoshio Shimozato (下郷羊雄, Shimozato Yoshio; 8 December 1907 – 6 April 1981) was a Japanese painter and photographer associated with Japanese Surrealism and the avant-garde milieu in Nagoya. He was a member of the artists' group Shinzōkei and became one of the figures associated with the Nagoya Avant-Garde Club, which brought together painters, poets, and photographers in the late 1930s.

Shimozato's importance in the history of Japanese Surrealism is closely tied to the development of avant-garde photography in Nagoya. Scholarship describes the photographic offshoot that emerged after the dismantling of the Nagoya Avant-Garde Club in 1939 as reflecting his shift of focus from painting to photography. He is particularly associated with the 1940 photobook Mesemu zoku (Mesemb Genus, Collection of Surrealist Photographs), which he edited and for which he contributed a substantial portion of the photographs.

== Early life and turn to Surrealism ==
Shimozato was active in Nagoya as a painter and belonged to Shinzōkei, a group linked to the city's Surrealist and avant-garde circles. According to Majella Munro, he recorded in his diary that he "awakened to 'the fascination of Surrealism'" after seeing works by Miró and Ernst at the Nagoya venue of the 1932 exhibition of Surrealist works. Munro also notes that Shimozato had especially close friendships with Chirū Yamanaka and Kansuke Yamamoto, who purchased several of his paintings, and that his diaries suggest he read Yamanaka's critical writings and borrowed European Surrealist publications from him.

Shimozato's early Surrealist formation has also been linked to the circulation of criticism and reproductions within Nagoya. Munro notes that works by Shimozato were used to illustrate Shūzō Takiguchi's "Surrealist Formal Theory", and that members of Shinzōkei were already familiar with much recent European Surrealist painting through Yamanaka's activities and the preparations surrounding the 1937 Exhibition of Surrealist Works from Overseas.

== Nagoya Avant-Garde Club and the Nagoya milieu ==
At the end of 1937, Shimozato became one of the figures associated with the Nagoya Avant-Garde Club, a local grouping of painters, poets, and photographers active in Nagoya. In scholarship on Japanese Surrealism, and in the Nagoya section of the 2022 Tokyo Photographic Art Museum exhibition Avant-Garde Rising: The Photographic Vanguard in Modern Japan, the club has been treated as one of the clearest examples of a regional avant-garde milieu in which literary, painterly, and photographic practices overlapped.

In December 1938, Shimozato took part in a discussion in Nagoya with Minoru Sakata and Yamanaka that was later transcribed in the February 1939 issue of the locally published magazine Kameraman. Stephanie D'Alessandro and Matthew Gale describe the participants as sharing a grounding in Shinkō shashin while pursuing a hybrid mixture of abstraction, Surrealism, natural objects, and everyday scenery as key elements of the Surrealist imagination. This Nagoya milieu is important for understanding the later development of Nagoya Photo Avant-Garde, in which Kansuke Yamamoto would become one of the central figures.

Munro also places Shimozato within a specifically Nagoya-based current of Surrealism that differed in emphasis from the more orthodox Bretonian line associated with Tokyo. In this context, Yamanaka's writings on Surrealist objects and photographic illustration played an important part in shaping Shimozato's later work. Bibliographer Kikyō Sasaki also lists Shimozato among the contributors to the Surrealist journal Yoru no Funsui, identifying him specifically as a contributor of drawings.

== From painting to photography ==
As the political climate worsened toward the end of the 1930s, pressure on artistic freedom intensified in Japan. In 1939, the police banned the Surrealist journal Yoru no Funsui, which Yamamoto had launched the previous year, and the Nagoya Avant-Garde Club was dismantled. D'Alessandro and Gale describe the photographic offshoot established that year as Nagoya Photo Avant-Garde, and state that its formation reflected Shimozato's shift of focus from painting to photography.

This shift has been treated in later scholarship as a significant moment in the history of Japanese Surrealist photography. Jelena Stojković places Shimozato among those Nagoya practitioners who developed a specifically photographic approach to Surrealism through close-up views of natural objects, abstraction, and experimental layout. She also notes that Shimozato's work participated in a broader attempt to construct an alternative vision of locality and everyday life under increasingly repressive wartime conditions.

== Mesemu zoku ==
Shimozato is most closely associated with the 1940 photobook Mesemu zoku: Chōgenjitsushugi shashin-shū (Mesemb Genus, Collection of Surrealist Photographs). Stojković describes the project as having been developed by Shimozato together with Sakata in the immediate aftermath of the Nagoya meeting, during two months of daily collaboration between January and March 1939. Published in 1940, the volume brought together experiments with natural objects, abstraction, and close-up photography.

The book opened from both sides and carried separate Japanese and French titles. Stojković notes that Shimozato was credited as both author and editor, and that the photographs in the French-reading sequence were all by him, while the reverse side included images by collaborators identified by Roman letters. The project also included work by Minoru Sakata, Tsugio Tajima, Taizō Inagaki, and specialist collectors of Mesembryanthemaceae cacti.

In Surrealism Beyond Borders, D'Alessandro and Gale describe Mesemu zoku as the most important product of the Nagoya Photo Avant-Garde. Their account emphasizes both the collaborative character of the volume and the erotic charge of its anthropomorphic cactus imagery. Munro similarly connects the project to Yamanaka's and Takiguchi's writings on Surrealist objects, comparing its application of object theory to photography with the work of Hans Bellmer.

Copies survive in institutional collections including the British Museum and the Nagoya City Art Museum.

== Position within Japanese Surrealism ==
Shimozato has been positioned in scholarship as one of the key figures in the Nagoya-centered development of Japanese Surrealism in the late 1930s and early 1940s. His importance lies less in a single movement label than in the way his career connects painting, Surrealist discussion circles, avant-garde photography, and collaborative photobook production.

Because of this, Shimozato is relevant not only to the history of regional Surrealism in Nagoya but also to accounts of prewar Japanese photography that link figures such as Kansuke Yamamoto, Minoru Sakata, and Nagoya Photo Avant-Garde to wider histories of Surrealist image-making.

== See also ==
- Nagoya Avant-Garde Club
- Nagoya Photo Avant-Garde
- Surrealism in Japan
- Surrealism in Nagoya
- Avant-garde photography in Japan
- Photography in Nagoya
- Kaigai Chōgenjitsushugi Sakuhinten
- Chirū Yamanaka
- Minoru Sakata
- Kansuke Yamamoto (artist)
