= Nagoya Photo Avant-Garde =

Japanese avant-garde photography collective based in Nagoya (formed 1939)

- ナゴヤ・フォトアバンガルド
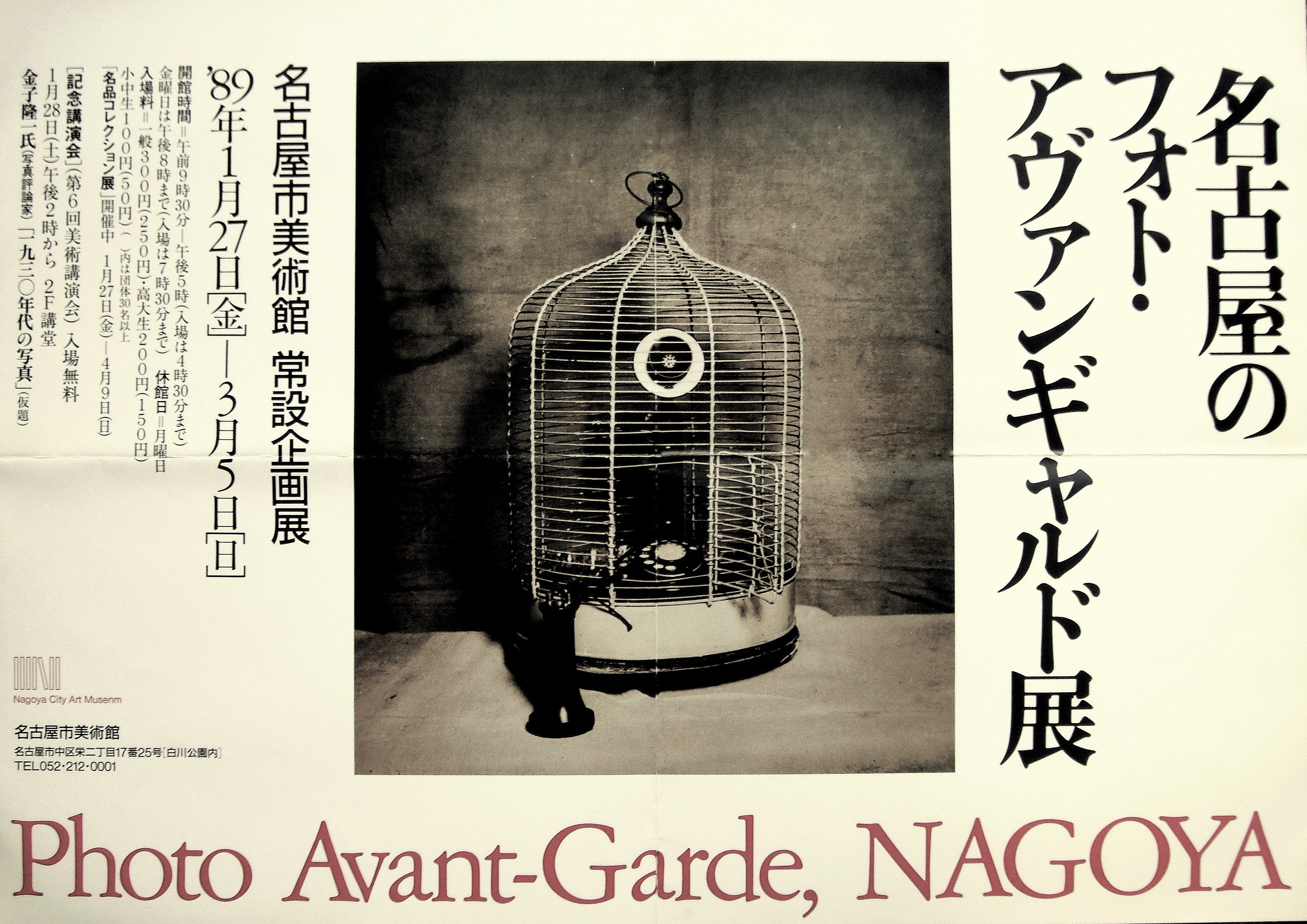
- Photo Avant-Garde, NAGOYA exhibition at Nagoya City Art Museum, 1989, showing a central photograph of Variation of "Buddhist Temple's Birdcage"
- Formation: February 1939
- Founder: Yoshio Shimozato; Minoru Sakata; Seikō Samizo; Chirū Yamanaka; Taizō Inagaki; Tsugio Tajima; Kansuke Yamamoto
- Dissolved: 1941
- Type: Surrealist and avant-garde photography collective
- Location: Nagoya, Japan
- Leader: Minoru Sakata
- Key people: Kansuke Yamamoto; Tsugio Tajima; Keiichiro Gotō
- Parent organization: Nagoya Avant-Garde Club
- Formerly called: Nagoya Photography Culture Association (名古屋写真文化協会)

Nagoya Photo Avant-Garde (Nagoya Foto Abangyarudo (ナゴヤ・フォトアバンガルド); also known as Nagoya Shashin Bunka Kyōkai (名古屋写真文化協会)) was a Nagoya-based Japanese avant-garde photography collective associated with Surrealist and abstract photographic experimentation in the late 1930s and early 1940s. It emerged when the photography section of the cross-disciplinary Nagoya Avant-Garde Club became independent. Through a Nagoya-based avant-garde circulation of clubs, magazines, and roundtable debates—including discussions in Camera Art and Photo Times and in the Nagoya coterie magazine Cameraman—the group developed and disseminated theories of avant-garde photography; it was led by Minoru Sakata and included the poet-photographer Kansuke Yamamoto.

Later historiography has emphasized Nagoya's outsized role in Japanese modern photography. Critic Ryuichi Kaneko characterizes Nagoya as a major base for Japanese Surrealism and—by 1939—an important stronghold of the photo-avant-garde. Photo historian Joe Takeba likewise characterizes Nagoya's photographic activity as a "magnetic field" for modern photographic expression in Japan.

In wall text and object labels prepared for Surrealism Beyond Borders (The Metropolitan Museum of Art / Tate Modern, 2021–2022), The Met describes Nagoya as "one of the liveliest centers" of Surrealism-related photo-club activity in interwar Japan, noting that wartime pressures forced groups to change names and veil their activity.

== Background ==
Nagoya's prewar avant-garde photography coalesced in the wake of the Kaigai Chōgenjitsushugi Sakuhinten (Exhibition of Overseas Surrealist Works), which toured Japan and was presented in Nagoya in 1937, helping to catalyze local networks around Surrealism and experimental practice. That same year, the critic–poet Chirū (Tiroux) Yamanaka and the painter Yoshio Shimozato formed the cross-disciplinary Nagoya Avant-Garde Club, in which critics and poets collaborated with photographers in developing an avant-garde milieu in the city.

According to museum and reference-database accounts, the club's photography section subsequently became independent in 1939, forming Nagoya Photo Avant-Garde; the group's emergence was closely tied to Nagoya-based circulation through clubs, photography magazines, and roundtable debates that helped define and disseminate "avant-garde photography" at a national scale. The collective was led by Minoru Sakata and included the poet-photographer Kansuke Yamamoto.

== Formation and membership ==
The Nagoya Photo Avant-Garde (ナゴヤ・フォトアバンガルド, Nagoya Foto Aban Garudo) formed in 1939 in Nagoya as the photography section of the local Nagoya Avant-Garde Club split off into an independent group. The parent club had been organized around the critic-poet Chirū Yamanaka and the painter Yoshio Shimozato, reflecting a Nagoya milieu in which photographers worked in close dialogue with poets and critics. Related authority records also list the group under the Japanese name Nagoya Photography Culture Association (名古屋写真文化協会, Nagoya Shashin Bunka Kyōkai) as a variant/related designation.

A 1990 exhibition catalogue published by Nagoya City Art Museum states that Nagoya Photo Avant-Garde was formed in February 1939 from the photo section of the Nagoya Avant-Garde Club, with Yoshio Shimozato, Minoru Sakata, Seikō Samizo, the critic-poet Chirū Yamanaka, Taizō Inagaki, Tsugio Tajima, and Kansuke Yamamoto among its founding members.

The group's central figure and leader was Minoru Sakata, whose career linked Osaka- and Nagoya-based avant-garde networks: while living in Osaka he belonged to the Naniwa Photography Club, and after relocating he helped organize the Nagoya Photo Gruppe in 1934 before leading the Nagoya Photo Avant-Garde. Exhibition materials from the Tokyo Photographic Art Museum emphasize that, in Nagoya, avant-garde photography developed through a circulation circuit of clubs, magazines, and roundtable discussion—via outlets such as Camera Art and Photo Times, and the Nagoya coterie magazine Cameraman, which hosted discussions reexamining avant-garde photography. Takeba traces the group's public emergence to the photo magazine Cameraman; its no. 29 (February 1939) ran a feature titled "Nagoya Photo Avant-Garde" in the wake of the roundtable reevaluating avant-garde photography.

Later scholarship has treated the group as one of the principal Nagoya sites through which Surrealist photography was developed, debated, and circulated in the late 1930s. In this reading, the group's members pursued a hybrid photographic language that brought together abstraction, Surrealism, and close attention to natural and everyday objects, extending the Nagoya discussions recorded in the February 1939 issue of Cameraman. The group's one of the most important collective product was the 1940 photobook Mesemu zoku: Chōgenjitsushugi shashin-shū / Mesemb, 20 photographies surréalistes, edited by Yoshio Shimozato, which gathered work by Shimozato, Minoru Sakata, Tsugio Tajima, and Taizō Inagaki and made the group's Surrealist orientation materially visible.

Key participants associated with the group and its immediate Nagoya circle included:

- Minoru Sakata — leader and principal theorist/organizer in the Nagoya chapter of the movement.
- Tsugio Tajima — photographer shown in the museum's Nagoya section alongside Sakata and others.
- Kansuke Yamamoto — poet-photographer identified as a participant in the Nagoya Photo Avant-Garde.
- Keiichiro Gotō — Nagoya-based photographer presented in the museum's Nagoya section as part of this avant-garde photography milieu.

== Activities ==
=== Publishing, criticism, and roundtables ===
A key arena for the group's activity was print culture: members (especially Minoru Sakata) used nationally circulated photography magazines to develop and debate the meanings and methods of avant-garde photography from a specifically Nagoya-based position. Sakata published photographic theory in Camera Art (カメラアート, Kamera Āto) (founded 1935) and Photo Times (フォトタイムス, Foto taimusu), framing Nagoya as a site where making photographs and arguing about them advanced together through clubs, magazines, and discussion forums.

This "production + discussion + publication" circuit also extended into amateur networks: Sakata played a leading role in the roundtable 「前衛写真再検討座談会」 (ぜんえいしゃしん さいけんとう ざだんかい, Zen'ei shashin saikentō zadankai) ("Reexamining avant-garde photography") in the Nagoya amateur photography magazine Cameraman (カメラマン, Kameraman) (founded 1936), helping consolidate Nagoya's image as an intellectual hub for avant-garde photography rather than merely a regional outpost of Tokyo or Kansai trends.

=== Regional circulation and connections ===
Contacts radiating outward from Nagoya are documented in the group's ties to other regional avant-garde circles. Sakata's activities included travel to Fukuoka, where he influenced members of the local avant-garde group Société Irf (ソシエテ・イルフ, Soshiete Irufu), underscoring a "Nagoya → other regions" vector in the circulation of Surrealist and abstract photographic experimentation in late-1930s Japan.

=== Wartime constraints, renaming, and dissolution ===
As wartime political pressure on Japanese Surrealism intensified, the association's activities were constrained not only by material conditions but also by ideological suspicion directed at the term "avant-garde." Under such pressures, the group changed its name to the Nagoya Photography Culture Association (名古屋写真文化協会 (なごや しゃしん ぶんか きょうかい, Nagoya shashin bunka kyōkai)) and was ultimately compelled to dissolve in 1941. As the association moved in a more conservative direction, Yamamoto left by the end of 1939 and continued to pursue avant-garde photography through Seidōsha, for which he produced the newsletter Carnet Bleu, first issued on 25 March 1941.

== Position within Japanese avant-garde photography ==
The Nagoya Photo Avant-Garde (ナゴヤ・フォトアバンガルド, Nagoya Foto Aban Garudo) is typically discussed as part of a wider, regionally networked surge of Japanese avant-garde photography in the 1930s and 1940s, shaped by the reception of Surrealism and abstract art and sustained through amateur clubs, exhibitions, and magazines. Nagoya's prewar experimental circles also included the Dokuritsu Shashin Kenkyūkai, which issued the self-published bulletin Dokuritsu. An exhibition overview by the Tokyo Photographic Art Museum (TOPMUSEUM) presents the period through region-based chapters—Osaka/Kansai, Nagoya, Fukuoka, and Tokyo—emphasizing multiple local centers connected by print circulation, traveling exhibitions, and debate rather than a single, linear "center-to-periphery" narrative.

In Kansai, TOPMUSEUM notes that the rise of avant-garde photography was closely linked to local club culture and new photographic techniques (including photogram and photomontage), with groups such as the Naniwa Photography Club providing a base from which experimental approaches gained visibility in the mid-1930s.

Within this wider map, TOPMUSEUM characterizes Nagoya's scene as distinctive for its cross-disciplinary collaboration and its emphasis on "circulation" as a system—production, discussion, and publication. The museum describes how critic-poet Chirū Yamanaka and painter Yoshio Shimozato formed the Nagoya Avant-Garde Club, from which a photography section later split off to form the Nagoya Photo Avant-Garde; in this account, the group was led by Minoru Sakata and included the poet-photographer Kansuke Yamamoto. The same TOPMUSEUM summary highlights how members advanced theory and debate through photography magazines such as Camera Art and Photo Times, and how the coterie magazine Cameraman (published by Cameraman Inc. from 1936) organized roundtables that "reexamined" avant-garde photography—framing Nagoya as a site where avant-garde practice was actively theorized through print and discussion.

This "multiple centers" framing is reinforced by TOPMUSEUM's account of interregional exchange: it notes that Nagoya members visited Fukuoka and that their activity influenced the formation of Société IRF there in 1939, underscoring a Nagoya-to-other-regions vector rather than only influence flowing into Nagoya. In Japanese-language materials for the same exhibition, TOPMUSEUM further describes the 1937 International Surrealist exhibition (planned by Shūzō Takiguchi and Chirū Yamanaka) as a stimulus that circulated beyond Tokyo through multiple cities (including Osaka and Nagoya), helping to catalyze local experiments and collaborations that would later be associated with "avant-garde photography."

== Names, legacy, and later reception ==
=== Names ===
The collective is commonly referred to as Nagoya Photo Avant-Garde (ナゴヤ・フォトアバンガルド, Nagoya Foto Aban Garudo). In English-language sources, the name is typically translated as "Nagoya Photo Avant-Garde," while contemporaneous romanization is also found in the form "Nagoya Foto Aban Garudo".

Under political pressure—particularly suspicion raised by the term "avant-garde"—the group reportedly dropped "avant-garde" from its name, becoming the Nagoya Shashin Bunka Kyōkai (Nagoya Photography Culture Association) in 1939; it was compelled to dissolve in 1941.

=== Postwar legacy ===
Although the association itself was short-lived, accounts of postwar Nagoya photography often trace a local continuity of experimental practice through later collectives and exhibition activity. Photo historian Yoshiteru Kurosawa argues that treating prewar "avant-garde photography" as a short-lived movement can obscure continuities into the postwar period, noting that sustained scholarly research on the field only began in the late 1980s. For example, VIVI (photography group) (organized in 1947) has been described as the first postwar photographic collective in Nagoya, and photographers associated with the city also participated in broader postwar avant-garde frameworks such as the photography division of the Bijutsu Bunka Kyōkai (Fine Art and Culture Association).

=== Later reception ===
The group is frequently discussed in scholarship on interwar Japanese avant-garde photography and regional modernism, especially in relation to Nagoya-based poet–photographers including Kansuke Yamamoto. In the 21st century, museum projects and research surveys have also contributed to renewed visibility of prewar avant-garde photography beyond Tokyo and the Kansai region; the Tokyo Photographic Art Museum's exhibition Avant-Garde Rising: The Photographic Vanguard in Modern Japan (2022) explicitly frames the period through geographically distributed activity and notes the recent growth of research and international presentation.

==== International museum context ====
In object labels prepared for Surrealism Beyond Borders (The Metropolitan Museum of Art / Tate Modern, 2021–2022), The Met describes Mesemu zoku (Mesemb Genus: 20 Surrealist Photographs, Nagoya, 1940) as an important product of the Nagoya Foto Abangarudo (Nagoya Photo Avant-Garde), established in 1939 by the painter Yoshio Shimozato, and notes that a copy is held by the museum's Joyce F. Menschel Photography Library.

A closely related work by Yamamoto from the same Nagoya milieu is Birdcage at a Buddhist Temple, a 1940 sequence of two images in which a telephone receiver appears first inside and then outside a birdcage.

Stojkovic writes that these photographs "certainly offer a critique of the silencing of critical thought" and argues that they should be read in relation to contemporary debates on the subversive potential of the Surrealist object.

She also notes that Yamamoto returned to the motif of the disconnected telephone receiver later in 1940, in the photograph Landscape published in VOU.

== See also ==
- Surrealism in Nagoya
- Photography in Nagoya
- Surrealism in Japan
- Surrealist photography in Japan
- Minoru Sakata
- Kansuke Yamamoto
- Nagoya Avant-Garde Club
- Société IRF
- VIVI (photography group)
- Bijutsu Bunka Kyōkai
