= Taizō Inagaki =

Japanese photographer associated with avant-garde photography in Nagoya

- 稲垣泰三
- Occupation: Photographer
- Known for: Membership in Nagoya Photo Avant-Garde; Participation in Mesemu zoku
- Movement: Avant-garde photography; Surrealism

Taizō Inagaki (稲垣泰三, Inagaki Taizō) was a Japanese photographer associated with avant-garde photography in Nagoya. He was among the photographers active in the Nagoya avant-garde milieu during the 1930s and was later counted among the members of Nagoya Photo Avant-Garde.

== Early activity ==
MEM's overview of Nagoya avant-garde photography identifies Inagaki as one of the photographers who, together with figures such as Minoru Sakata and Tsugio Tajima, helped form the Nagoya Photo Gruppe by 1934. This places him within the same prewar regional milieu from which later Nagoya avant-garde photography emerged.

== Nagoya Photo Avant-Garde ==
In 1939, Inagaki was among the photographers associated with Nagoya Photo Avant-Garde, the photographic offshoot that continued avant-garde activity in Nagoya under increasing wartime pressure. In Surrealism Beyond Borders, he is identified together with Kansuke Yamamoto and Tsugio Tajima as part of the group around 1939–40.

Tokyo Photographic Art Museum's overview of avant-garde photography in Nagoya places the group within a milieu in which Nagoya photographers developed and debated their theories in magazines such as Camera Art and Photo Times, while roundtable discussions on avant-garde photography were organized through the locally published coterie magazine Cameraman.

== Mesemu zoku ==
Inagaki's work was included in Mesemu zoku: Chōgenjitsushugi shashin-shū / Mesemb, 20 photographies surréalistes (1940), a collaborative photobook associated with Nagoya Photo Avant-Garde. Surrealism Beyond Borders, the catalogue published by the Metropolitan Museum of Art and Tate Modern, notes that the volume, edited by Yoshio Shimozato, included works by Shimozato, Sakata, Tajima, and Inagaki, and was produced collaboratively with specialist collectors of Mesembryanthemaceae cacti. Jelena Stojković likewise describes the project as one in which Shimozato mobilized the other photographers of the club, including Inagaki and Tajima, for a Surrealist photobook developed in the immediate aftermath of the Nagoya meeting of late 1938.

Copies survive in institutional collections including the British Museum and the Nagoya City Art Museum.

== Position in Nagoya photography ==
Inagaki is relevant to the history of Photography in Nagoya as one of the photographers who helped shape the city's prewar avant-garde network and its wartime Surrealist-inflected offshoots. His career is also relevant to accounts of avant-garde photography in Japan, especially through the activities of Nagoya Photo Avant-Garde and related photographers such as Kansuke Yamamoto.

== See also ==
- Kansuke Yamamoto (artist)
- Nagoya Photo Avant-Garde
- Tsugio Tajima
- Minoru Sakata
- Yoshio Shimozato
- Photography in Nagoya
- Avant-garde photography in Japan
- Surrealism in Japan
