= Cameraman (Japanese magazine) =

Japanese photography magazine published in Nagoya

- Categories: Photography magazine
- Frequency: Monthly
- Founded: October 1936
- Final issue: November 1940
- Company: Cameraman-sha
- Country: Japan
- Based in: Nagoya
- Language: Japanese

Cameraman (Japanese: Cameraman (カメラマン, Kameraman)) was a monthly Japanese photography magazine published in Nagoya by Cameraman-sha from October 1936 to November 1940. Originally aimed at amateur photographers, it became an important local forum for the discussion and circulation of experimental and avant-garde photography in late-1930s Nagoya.

== Background ==
By the mid-1930s, Nagoya had become a major centre of photographic activity. Takeba notes that the number of photographic-supplies dealers in the city rose from nine in 1925 to sixteen in 1930 and to sixty-one by October 1936, the month Cameraman was launched. In that context, he describes Cameraman as an unusually ambitious amateur photography magazine for a regional city, reflecting both the scale of local photographic culture and the demand for printed forums of exchange.

== Founding and editorial circle ==
Cameraman was launched in October 1936 by an initial dōjin circle that included Narita Shunyō, Namiki Keio, Nagata Niryu, and Benimura Kiyohiko. In November 1937, Mikuni Shōjirō, Takada Minayoshi, Okonogi Mitsuya, and Samizo Seikō joined the circle, after which Nagata served as the magazine's principal editor.

== Editorial mission and readership ==
In its opening statement, the magazine presented photography as a pastime especially suited to modern cultural life. Sold at ten sen, the first issue reportedly sold out at 5,000 copies, indicating that the magazine addressed a readership broader than a small avant-garde circle alone.

== Contributors and published works ==
Cameraman published work by a wide range of Nagoya-based and related photographers. Works reproduced in its pages included Kaifu Seiya's Noma nite, Matsuura Kōyō's Namikiri fūkei, and Samizo Seikō's Aki no kaze in the inaugural issue; Imai Nobuoki's Ami ni yoru onna in no. 12; Takada's Onna in no. 14; Taizō Inagaki's Tachibanashi in no. 17 and Narita's Tōdai no aru fūkei in no. 26. Later issues also reproduced work by Yoshio Shimozato and Tsugio Tajima, including Shimozato's Kūbaku no fūkei and Object and Lumière and Tajima's Kaze no object in no. 29, and Shimozato's Buttai ni yoru yume no kasaku and Madame X no funshoku in no. 33.

== "Reexamination of Avant-Garde Photography" roundtable ==
One of the magazine's key interventions in the history of Japanese avant-garde photography was the roundtable "Reexamination of Avant-Garde Photography", held in Nagoya in late 1938 and published in issue no. 29 in February 1939. Featuring Yoshio Shimozato, Chirū Yamanaka, and Minoru Sakata, the discussion addressed the relation between Surrealism and abstraction, automatism in photography, and the aesthetic possibilities of avant-garde image-making. In Takeba's account, the roundtable marked a key moment in the local articulation of "avant-garde photography" in Nagoya.

== Position within Nagoya avant-garde photography ==
Takeba places Cameraman within the broader rise of experimental and avant-garde photography in Nagoya in the 1930s. In his summary of the Nagoya section in Avant-Garde Rising, he identifies the magazine as a forum in which Sakata made a central intervention while the city's avant-garde photographic groups were being formed through collaboration among critics, poets, and photographers. Later scholarship likewise treats the February 1939 discussion in Cameraman as part of the Nagoya milieu in which Sakata, Shimozato, and Yamanaka debated the Surrealist and abstract directions of avant-garde photography. In this sense, the magazine belonged to the same local network from which Nagoya Photo Avant-Garde emerged in 1939 and in which Kansuke Yamamoto later worked. Takeba also notes that participants in these Nagoya debates later visited Fukuoka, where they influenced members of Société Irf.

== Later years and closure ==
Cameraman ceased publication with no. 50 in November 1940. Takeba's chronology places the magazine's end in the same period when wartime controls on photography were intensifying, including the consolidation of photography magazines, rationing of photographic materials, and prior censorship of subjects to be photographed.

== See also ==
- Kansuke Yamamoto (artist)
- Nagoya Photo Avant-Garde
- Photography in Nagoya
- Avant-garde photography in Japan
- Surrealism in Japan
- Surrealism in Nagoya
- Yoru no Funsui
- Ciné
