= Minoru Sakata =

Japanese photographer

- 坂田 稔
- Born: 1902
- Died: 1974 (aged 71–72)
- Occupation: Photographer
- Known for: Leading the formation of Nagoya Photo Gruppe; participation in the Nagoya Avant-Garde Club and the Nagoya Photo Avant-Garde
- Notable work: Kiki (1938)
- Movement: Shinkō shashin, avant-garde photography

Minoru Sakata (坂田 稔, Sakata Minoru; 1902–1974) was a Japanese photographer active in the prewar avant-garde photography networks of Nagoya. While living in Osaka he was a member of the Naniwa Photography Club, and after moving to Nagoya he led the formation of Nagoya Photo Gruppe in 1934. He later participated in the Nagoya Avant-Garde Club and the Nagoya Photo Avant-Garde. He was also described as a leading organizer and polemicist in Nagoya's prewar avant-garde photography circles.

== Career ==
Takeba identifies Sakata as one of the figures who helped bring the experimental currents of Shinkō shashin from Osaka into Nagoya in the 1930s. While working in Osaka he belonged to the Naniwa Photography Club, one of the major Kansai sites for experimental photography.

In 1934 Sakata opened a camera and photography supply shop in Nagoya. According to MEM, the shop drew figures such as Yoshio Shimozato, Chirū Yamanaka, Tsugio Tajima, and Taizō Inagaki, and the circle coalesced as the avant-garde collective Nagoya Photo Gruppe. Later accounts place Sakata among the photographers active in the Nagoya Avant-Garde Club, formed in 1937, and in the Nagoya Photo Avant-Garde, which became independent from the club's photography section in 1939.

Takeba describes Sakata as already active in photo theory by 1938, when he attended a Photo Times roundtable on "avant-garde photography". He also appeared in the Nagoya discussions later published in the February 1939 issue of Cameraman, where local photographers debated the relation between Surrealism, abstraction, and avant-garde photography in Japan. In this milieu Sakata worked alongside photographers and writers including Kansuke Yamamoto, Yamanaka, and Shimozato, while magazines such as Photo Times, Camera Art, and Cameraman circulated Nagoya work to a wider national audience. Through these magazines and roundtables, Sakata participated in debates that gave Nagoya's avant-garde a wider national profile.

Takeba records that the original Nagoya Photo Avant-Garde dissolved in November 1939 and frames the break between Sakata and Yamamoto as an unresolved disagreement over whether photographic innovation could be reconciled with nationalism as wartime pressure intensified. MEM similarly notes that, after the group's dissolution, Sakata moved toward ethnographic photography influenced by the mingei movement, while Yamamoto remained committed to avant-garde practice.

Work by Sakata also appeared in Mesemu zoku (1940), the Surrealist photobook edited by Yoshio Shimozato that included photographs by Sakata and other Nagoya photographers. Copies survive in institutional collections including the British Museum and the Nagoya City Art Museum.

== Legacy ==
Sakata's photographs and his role in Nagoya's prewar avant-garde networks have been revisited in later museum projects on Japanese photography, including the Tokyo Photographic Art Museum exhibition Avant-Garde Rising: The Photographic Vanguard in Modern Japan. In Japan's Modern Divide, Kōtarō Iizawa reproduced Sakata's photograph Kiki (1938) within the Nagoya avant-garde context in which Kansuke Yamamoto also worked. The 2025 MEM exhibition The Legacy of Avant-garde Photography in Nagoya, 1930s–50s likewise presented Sakata among the key photographers through whom Nagoya's avant-garde legacy has been reassessed, alongside figures such as Yamamoto, Keiichirō Gotō, Minayoshi Takada, Tsugio Tajima, and Yoshifumi Hattori.

== See also ==
- Photography in Nagoya
- Surrealism in Nagoya
- Nagoya Photo Avant-Garde
- Nagoya Avant-Garde Club
