= Tsugio Tajima =

Japanese photographer active in Nagoya's avant-garde photography circles

- 田島二男
- Born: 1903; Urawa, Saitama Prefecture, Japan
- Died: 2002 (aged 98–99)
- Occupation: Photographer
- Known for: Membership in Nagoya Photo Avant-Garde; Participation in Mesemu zoku; Later involvement in Group Spiral and the Japan Federation of Subjective Photography
- Movement: Avant-garde photography; Surrealism; Subjective photography

Tsugio Tajima (田島二男, Tajima Tsugio; 1903–2002) was a Japanese photographer active in Nagoya's avant-garde photography circles. He was a member of Nagoya Photo Avant-Garde, alongside photographers including Kansuke Yamamoto, and later participated in Group Spiral and the Japan Federation of Subjective Photography. His work was included in the 1940 photobook Mesemu zoku, one of the key publications associated with Nagoya's wartime Surrealist photography.

== Early life and prewar activity ==
According to a biographical profile published by MEM, Tajima was born in Urawa in 1903, initially worked at a bank, and later turned to photography. During military service he met the photographer Minoru Sakata, an encounter that became important to his later involvement in Nagoya's photographic avant-garde. By 1934, he had helped found the Nagoya Photo Gruppe, and he later contributed photographs to magazines such as Kameraman and Photo Times.

Museum catalogues document Tajima's prewar work from the 1930s and early 1940s. Later exhibition materials, including the 2022 Tokyo Photographic Art Museum exhibition Avant-Garde Rising: The Photographic Vanguard in Modern Japan, have continued to present this body of work.

Works from this period include Azusa (1932), Cultivated Face (1934), Cyrano (1939), and Work A (1940).

== Nagoya Photo Avant-Garde ==
Tajima was among the photographers active in the Nagoya avant-garde milieu that consolidated at the end of the 1930s. In their account of the movement, Stephanie D'Alessandro and Matthew Gale place him among the members of Nagoya Photo Avant-Garde, the photographic offshoot established in 1939 after the dismantling of the Nagoya Avant-Garde Club under increasing wartime pressure. They identify Tajima together with Yamamoto and Taizō Inagaki as part of the group around 1939–40, when photography magazines such as Photo Times and Camera Art were reproducing works by Nagoya photographers and giving the group a wider national visibility.

== Mesemu zoku and close-up photography ==
Tajima's work was included in Mesemu zoku: Chōgenjitsushugi shashin-shū / Mesemb, 20 photographies surréalistes (1940), a collaborative photobook edited by Yoshio Shimozato and identified in Surrealism Beyond Borders as a key publication of Nagoya Photo Avant-Garde. In that account, the volume included works by Shimozato, Sakata, Tajima, and Inagaki, and was produced collaboratively with collectors specializing in Mesembryanthemaceae cacti.

Jelena Stojković has discussed Tajima's photographs Dishcloth Embroidery (Zōkin no nuitori) and Piles of Folded Newspapers (Tsumi kasanerareta shinbunshi) as close-up and abstract renderings of everyday objects. In her reading, such works exemplify a Nagoya-based approach in which worn surfaces and common-use materials were isolated through the close-up and transformed into ambiguous visual forms.

Copies survive in institutional collections including the British Museum and the Nagoya City Art Museum.

== Later work ==
After the war, Tajima remained active in photography. MEM's profile states that he later participated in Group Spiral and the Japan Federation of Subjective Photography. The same profile notes that he held his first solo exhibition in 1985. It also identifies his works as being held by the Nagoya City Art Museum and the Tokyo Photographic Art Museum.

One documented example of his later activity is the photograph Autumn (Aki), dated 1955; MEM notes an inscription on the verso identifying it with the first Spiral exhibition in Nagoya in October 1955.

== Position in Nagoya photography ==
Tajima is relevant to the history of Photography in Nagoya as a figure linking the city's prewar avant-garde experimentation with later postwar photographic activity. His career is also relevant to the study of avant-garde photography in Japan and Surrealism in Japan, particularly through his role in Nagoya Photo Avant-Garde and his proximity to photographers such as Kansuke Yamamoto and Minoru Sakata.

== See also ==
- Kansuke Yamamoto (artist)
- Nagoya Photo Avant-Garde
- Minoru Sakata
- Yoshio Shimozato
- Photography in Nagoya
- Avant-garde photography in Japan
- Surrealism in Japan
