= Chirū Yamanaka =

Japanese poet, critic and promoter of Surrealism (1905–1977)

- 山中 散生
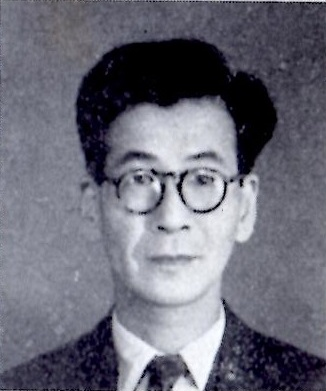
- Born: Toshiyuki Yamanaka; May 7, 1905
- Died: September 11, 1977 (aged 72)
- Other name: Tiroux Yamanaka
- Occupations: Poet, critic, translator, editor
- Known for: Founding the poetry magazine CINÉ; promoting Surrealism in Japan; co-organizing the 1937 Kaigai Chōgenjitsushugi Sakuhinten
- Movement: Surrealism

Chirū Yamanaka (山中 散生, Yamanaka Chirū) (7 May 1905 – 11 September 1977), born Toshiyuki Yamanaka and also known as Tiroux Yamanaka, was a Japanese poet, critic, translator, and editor who played a central role in introducing Surrealism to Japan. Working in Nagoya during the interwar years, he founded the avant-garde poetry magazine CINÉ in 1929 and established direct contacts with European Surrealists including Paul Éluard and André Breton. In 1937, Yamanaka and Shūzō Takiguchi organized the touring Kaigai Chōgenjitsushugi Sakuhinten (Exhibition of Overseas Surrealist Works), with assistance from European Surrealists including Éluard, Georges Hugnet, and Roland Penrose. Breton and Éluard's 1938 Dictionnaire abrégé du surréalisme listed Yamanaka as a Surrealist poet and writer and identified him as a promoter of the movement in Japan.

Yamanaka was also active in Nagoya's avant-garde circles in the late 1930s. He helped establish the Nagoya Avant-Garde Club and the Nagoya Photo Avant-Garde, where he introduced fellow members to recent developments in Surrealism abroad. He was closely involved with Yoru no Funsui (夜の噴水, The Night's Fountain), a Surrealist poetry magazine founded by the poet and photographer Kansuke Yamamoto in Nagoya in 1938, and later published a poetry collection of his own under the same title in 1963. He continued to publish poetry and criticism after the Second World War, as well as books on the history of Surrealism and Dada.

== Life and work ==
=== Early work and CINÉ ===
Yamanaka began publishing poetry while still a student in Nagoya and contributed to the coterie magazine Seikishi (青騎士) in the early 1920s. In 1929 he founded CINÉ, initially a magazine of poetry and film that soon turned increasingly toward Surrealism.

CINÉ published translations of European Surrealist poetry and writing alongside work by Japanese contributors. Yamanaka and Tokusaburō Nishiwaki translated passages from Breton and Philippe Soupault's The Magnetic Fields, and Yamanaka later published his own translations of poems by Éluard.

=== Contacts with European Surrealists ===
Yamanaka began corresponding with Éluard in 1933 and subsequently exchanged letters and publications with Breton, Hugnet, Hans Bellmer, and other European Surrealists. Much of this correspondence survives at Keio University; Munro describes Yamanaka's prewar correspondence as the best-preserved body of its kind among Japanese Surrealists.

In 1936 Yamanaka published L'Échange surréaliste, copies of which circulated among European Surrealists including Éluard and Penrose. The following year he worked with Takiguchi on Album Surréaliste, a special issue of the art magazine Mizue, and on the Kaigai Chōgenjitsushugi Sakuhinten.

The exhibition toured Tokyo, Kyoto, Osaka, and Nagoya and presented hundreds of works and reproductions by European Surrealists. Surrealism Beyond Borders credits Yamanaka and Takiguchi with organizing the exhibition with help from Éluard, Hugnet, Penrose, and other European contacts.

Yamanaka's activities were also known in Paris. Breton and Éluard's Dictionnaire abrégé du surréalisme (1938) included him as a Surrealist poet and writer and as a promoter of Surrealism in Japan.

=== Nagoya avant-garde circles ===
In November 1937, Yamanaka and the painter Yoshio Shimozato helped found the Nagoya Avant-Garde Club, which brought together poets, painters, and photographers. In 1939, its photography section became independent as the Nagoya Photo Avant-Garde. Yamanaka helped form the group with Minoru Sakata, Shimozato, and Tsugio Tajima. Poet-photographer Kansuke Yamamoto was also a member.

The Nagoya City Art Museum describes Yamanaka as a theoretical leader of the Nagoya Photo Avant-Garde. At the group's meetings, he discussed recent developments in Surrealism abroad and showed members publications such as Minotaure and Cahiers d'Art.

His work in Nagoya was part of his broader efforts to introduce Surrealism to Japan. The Tokyo Photographic Art Museum describes Yamanaka as having played a central role in this process.

=== Yoru no Funsui ===
In a study of Yamanaka's life and poetry, Yoshiteru Kurosawa suggests that Yamanaka was planning a second poetry collection titled Yoru no Funsui (夜の噴水) in the latter half of the 1930s. The book was not published at the time; Kurosawa attributes this to the amount of time Yamanaka was devoting to presenting Surrealism through publications and exhibitions.

In November 1938, the poet and photographer Kansuke Yamamoto founded a Surrealist poetry magazine in Nagoya under the same title, Yoru no Funsui, and Kurosawa describes Yamanaka as fully involved in the magazine. A chronology published by the Nagoya City Art Museum likewise records Yamanaka and Yamamoto together in connection with the magazine's founding. Kurosawa notes that no surviving document establishes how the magazine acquired its title.

During this period, wartime censorship in Japan was becoming increasingly strict. The magazine drew the attention of the Special Higher Police, and publication was not allowed to continue. The fourth issue, published in October 1939, was the last.

In 1963 Yamanaka published his own poetry collection under the same title, Yoru no Funsui, through Presse Bibliomane. The volume contains eighteen four-line poems.

=== Postwar work ===
Yamanaka continued to publish poetry and criticism after the Second World War. In 1948 he joined Katsue Kitasono and others in publishing CENDRE, and in 1949 he published Shururearisumu shikō josetsu (シュルレアリスム史考序説).

His postwar poetry collections included Tasogare no hito (黄昏の人, 1956), Yoru no Funsui (1963), and Suna no gakki (砂の楽器, 1967). In his later years he returned to the documentary history of Surrealism, publishing Surréalisme shiryō to kaisō (シュルレアリスム資料と回想) in 1971 and Dada ronkō (ダダ論考) in 1975.

Yamanaka died on 11 September 1977, aged 72.

== Selected works ==
- Jouer au feu (山中散生詩集 火串戯, 1935), poetry collection
- L'Échange surréaliste (1936), editor
- Shururearisumu shikō josetsu (シュルレアリスム史考序説, 1949)
- Tasogare no hito (黄昏の人, 1956), poetry collection
- Yoru no Funsui (夜の噴水, 1963), poetry collection
- Suna no gakki (砂の楽器, 1967), poetry collection
- Surréalisme shiryō to kaisō (シュルレアリスム資料と回想, 1971)
- Dada ronkō (ダダ論考, 1975)

== See also ==
- Surrealism in Nagoya
- Surrealist photography in Japan
- Photography in Nagoya
