= Yoru no Funsui =

Japanese Surrealist poetry journal (1938–1939)

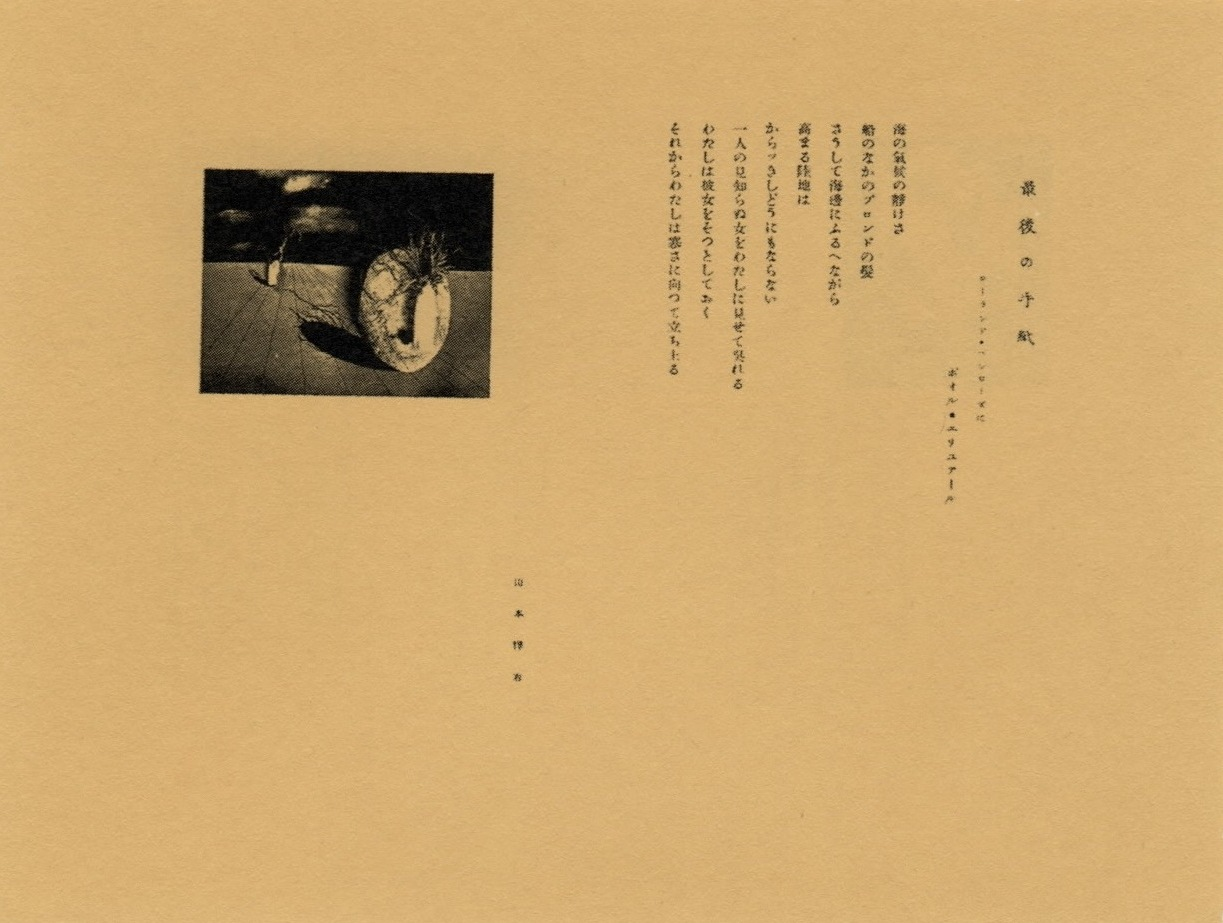
- A page from the first issue of Yoru no Funsui (1938)
- Native name: 夜の噴水
- Editor: Kansuke Yamamoto
- Categories: Surrealist poetry journal
- Frequency: Irregular
- Format: Pamphlet (c. 250 × 150 mm)
- Circulation: 100 copies (nos. 1–3); 65 copies (no. 4)
- Publisher: Kansuke Yamamoto
- First issue: November 1938
- Final issue Number: October 1939; 4
- Country: Japan
- Based in: Nagoya, Japan
- Language: Japanese

Yoru no Funsui (夜の噴水; lit. "The Night's Fountain") was a Japanese Surrealist poetry journal edited and published by the poet-photographer Kansuke Yamamoto in Nagoya from 1938 to 1939. Chirū Yamanaka was closely involved in its publication, while Shōko Ema, Katsue Kitasono, Shirō Murano and others contributed poetry and prose. The journal combined work by Japanese contributors with translations and reproductions of works by European writers and artists. Four issues appeared before publication ceased after intervention by the Tokkō.

A 1990 exhibition catalogue edited by the Nagoya City Art Museum described Yoru no Funsui as the last poetry journal in Japanese Surrealism to present itself as purely Surrealist. Yoshiteru Kurosawa notes that the first three issues included several translations from the French journal Cahiers G.L.M.. Kurosawa writes that, while Surrealist art was already being introduced in Japan through publications drawing on Cahiers d'Art and Minotaure, there were few comparable outlets for Surrealist poetry and prose. He describes Yoru no Funsui as virtually the only outlet in Japan for introducing such texts at the time.

== History ==
=== Origins ===
The Kaigai chōgenjitsushugi sakuhin-ten (Overseas Surrealist Works Exhibition), held at the Maruzen Gallery in Nagoya in July 1937, played an important part in the journal's origins. Yamamoto visited the exhibition repeatedly and met the poet and Surrealist Chirū (Tiroux) Yamanaka there; their meeting led to the founding of Yoru no Funsui the following year.

Yamamoto later recalled that he and Yamanaka discussed two possibilities: a magazine intended more directly to promote Surrealism, or one devoted mainly to Surrealist work; they chose the latter. He said they wanted an elegant journal that would bring together Surrealists and others whose work had a similar sensibility. Art historian Jelena Stojković writes that Yamamoto consulted Yamanaka while planning the journal and sought to reflect Surrealist principles in its contents, design and selection of works.

Kurosawa suggests that Yamanaka had been planning a second poetry collection titled Yoru no Funsui in the latter half of the 1930s. According to Kurosawa, the collection was not published at the time because Yamanaka was heavily involved in introducing Surrealism in Japan. When Yamamoto launched a Surrealist poetry journal under the same title in November 1938, Yamanaka became closely involved in its publication.

Kurosawa notes that no surviving document explains the origin of the title, but that "Yoru no Funsui" appears to have been an important phrase for Yamanaka during this period. Yamanaka later used the same title for a collection of eighteen quatrains published in 1963.

=== Publication and design ===
Four issues of Yoru no Funsui were published between November 1938 and October 1939. The 2001 Tokyo Station Gallery chronology records 12 pages for issues 1, 3 and 4, and 16 pages for issue 2. The first three issues had print runs of 100 copies each, while the fourth was limited to 65 copies.

Issue	Publication date	Pages	Print run
No. 1	1 November 1938	12	100 copies
No. 2	20 February 1939	16	100 copies
No. 3	15 August 1939	12	100 copies
No. 4	20 October 1939	12	65 copies

Bunshō Jugaku introduced Yamamoto to the papermaker Eishirō Abe, whom Yamamoto visited in Iwasaka village, Shimane Prefecture, to commission paper for the journal. According to bibliographer Kikyō Sasaki, the journal was printed on specially dyed washi paper that Abe made by hand from pure gampi. The typeface and colour of the journal's title changed with each issue, and silver-powder printing was used for the first issue. An untitled photograph by Yamamoto was pasted onto page 9 of the first issue. The second issue included Dalí's imagined portrait of Lautréamont, pasted onto page 9, and an inserted sheet of paraffin paper printed with a text by Edmond Jaloux.

Kinoshita places the publication of Yoru no Funsui against the rapid militarization of Japan in the late 1930s, citing the February 26 incident, the Marco Polo Bridge incident and the promulgation of the State General Mobilization Law. He notes that censorship was tightening, paper shortages were becoming severe and the number of periodical publications was declining. He also describes literary activity in Nagoya at the time as being in a marked decline.

=== Suppression and closure ===
The J. Paul Getty Museum states that Yamamoto stopped publishing Yoru no Funsui after the Tokkō expressed concern about its contents. Eiko Aoki similarly writes that Yamamoto was interrogated in 1939 and released on the condition that he stop publishing the journal; it ended after its fourth issue. Stojković discusses the closure as part of the broader suppression of Surrealist activity in Japan during the period.

A fifth issue was being prepared but was never published. Yamamoto later recalled that he had planned to end Yoru no Funsui after five or six issues and then publish a larger and thicker Surrealist journal. He said that the new journal could be printed on inexpensive paper and would seek to explain the spirit of Surrealism while introducing more work from abroad. Kurosawa writes that police intervention prevented this planned journal from being published as well.

According to a later letter cited by Kurosawa, the fifth issue did not proceed beyond the censorship stage. Kurosawa argues that the journal was not formally prohibited from sale or distribution under the publication law, but that the police questioning amounted in practice to ideological control. No proof sheets for the fifth issue are known to survive.

== Contents ==
Yoru no Funsui published poetry, prose, translations, photographs and drawings. Its contents included work by Yamamoto and other Japanese contributors, along with translations and reproductions of works by European writers and artists.

=== Selected contents ===
- No. 1 (1 November 1938)
  - Poetry and prose — Two texts on waking and sleeping dreams by Jérôme Cardan (T.Y.); a text from the posthumous writings of Clarisse Juranville (translator uncredited); Chirū Yamanaka's "Tōshihō"; Paul Éluard's "Saigo no tegami", addressed to Roland Penrose (translator uncredited); and Yamamoto's "Hikō techō I".
  - Photograph and illustrations — The issue included two small illustrations and an untitled photograph by Yamamoto.
  - Source of illustration — The drawing on page 7 was by Yves Tanguy and came from Henri Pastoureau's poetry collection Cri de la Méduse.
- No. 2 (20 February 1939)
  - Poetry and prose — Paul Éluard's "Boku wa nemurenai yume o miru" (T.Y.), Guy Lévis Mano's "Yume" (T.Y.), Shōko Ema's "Tanpopo no jusō", Yamanaka's "Jojōshi" 1–3, Katsue Kitasono's "Asa no binakuru", an untitled text by Michel Leiris (translator uncredited), and Yamamoto's "Hikō techō II".
  - Insert — A text by Edmond Jaloux, translated as Q, was printed on an inserted sheet of paraffin paper.
  - Illustrations — The issue reproduced Salvador Dalí's imagined portrait of Lautréamont, as well as drawings and illustrations by Man Ray, Yves Tanguy and Joan Miró.
  - Sources of illustrations — Dalí's portrait came from the 1938 José Corti edition of Lautréamont's collected works, while a Tanguy drawing came from Pastoureau's Cri de la Méduse.
- No. 3 (15 August 1939)
  - Poetry and prose — Maurice Blanchard's "Shūgyō jidai" and "Jigoku no Orufe" (both Q), Mitsuru Nishikawa's "Yūenshō", Yamanaka's "Utsukushii hito", and Karl Philipp Moritz's "Ekusutajii" (T.Y.).
  - Sources of translations — The two Blanchard texts came from issue 9 of Cahiers G.L.M. (March 1939), while the Moritz text came from issue 7 (March 1938).
  - Illustrations — The issue included two works by Yoshio Shimozato, a drawing by Shigeyoshi Nakamura, and three small illustrations by Yves Tanguy.
  - Source of illustrations — Tanguy's illustrations came from drawings made for Benjamin Péret's poetry collection Dormir dormir dans les pierres.
- No. 4 (20 October 1939)
  - Poetry and prose — Shirō Murano's "Yoru no suso", Yamamoto's "Kaze no nai shima", Yamanaka's "Kodokuken", Utarō Noda's "Jitensha no yō ni", a text by Guy Lévis Mano (Q), and Yamamoto's "Mae no yoru".
  - Illustrations — Small illustrations appeared on five pages and included drawings by Jean Arp and Yves Tanguy.
  - Sources of illustrations — Arp's drawings came from Tristan Tzara's De nos oiseaux, while Tanguy's came from Péret's Dormir dormir dans les pierres.

=== Translations and French Surrealism ===
Kurosawa notes that the first three issues of Yoru no Funsui included several translations from the French journal Cahiers G.L.M.. Issue 7 of Cahiers G.L.M. (March 1938) was devoted to dreams and consisted of texts and illustrations assembled by André Breton; the same material was also published under the title Trajectoire du rêve. Texts by Jérôme Cardan, Paul Éluard, Guy Lévis Mano, Michel Leiris and Karl Philipp Moritz from this issue appeared in translation in the first three issues of Yoru no Funsui. Two texts by Maurice Blanchard from issue 9 of Cahiers G.L.M. (March 1939) appeared in the third issue.

Citing Věra Linhartová, Kurosawa notes that dreams were a central subject in French Surrealism but remained unusual in Japanese Surrealist poetry at the time. Linhartová describes Yoru no Funsui as a rare publication devoted fully to this subject. Kurosawa writes that, while Surrealist art was already being introduced in Japan through publications drawing on Cahiers d'Art and Minotaure, there were few comparable outlets for Surrealist poetry and prose. He describes Yoru no Funsui as virtually the only outlet in Japan for introducing such texts at the time.

Yamamoto obtained French magazines and poetry books directly from publishers and booksellers. An order receipt sent by G.L.M. to Yamamoto on 21 November 1938 lists four issues of MINUTES. A reply sent by José Corti to Yamamoto on 19 January 1939 mentions Benjamin Péret's Dormir dormir dans les pierres. Kurosawa writes that Yamamoto used catalogues from José Corti and G.L.M. to purchase these publications.

Translations in the journal were signed "T.Y." or "Q", while others appeared without a translator's name. The Cardan text in no. 1, the Éluard and Guy Lévis Mano texts in no. 2, and the Moritz text in no. 3 were signed "T.Y.", which Kurosawa identifies with Yamanaka. The texts by Clarisse Juranville and Éluard in no. 1 and by Michel Leiris in no. 2 were unsigned. Kurosawa attributes these translations to Yamanaka on the basis of surviving manuscripts and handwriting. The Jaloux text in no. 2, the two Maurice Blanchard texts in no. 3, and the Guy Lévis Mano text in no. 4 were signed "Q", which Kurosawa identifies as Yamamoto's translator's mark.

With Yamanaka's help, Yoru no Funsui reached Paul Éluard in France. Amanda Maddox describes this as an attempt to continue the dialogue between Surrealists in Europe and Japan.

In an interview about Japan's Modern Divide, Maddox described Yamamoto as "a kind of translator". She said that Yamamoto brought Surrealist texts to Japanese readers through Yoru no Funsui while interpreting Surrealism in a Japanese context.

=== Contributors ===
Yoru no Funsui was edited and published by Kansuke Yamamoto. Chirū Yamanaka was closely involved in its publication and contributed poetry and translations. Other writers and artists contributed poetry, prose and drawings.

- Kansuke Yamamoto (山本悍右) — editor, publisher, writer, photographer and translator
- Chirū Yamanaka (山中散生) — poet and translator; closely involved in the journal's publication
- Shōko Ema (江間章子) — contributor
- Katsue Kitasono (北園克衛) — contributor
- Shirō Murano (村野四郎) — contributor
- Mitsuru Nishikawa (西川満) — contributor
- Utarō Noda (野田宇太郎) — contributor
- Yoshio Shimozato (下郷羊雄) — contributor of drawings

Kurosawa notes that many of the drawings and small illustrations reproduced in the journal came from foreign Surrealist poetry books. He states that none of the drawings or small illustrations were by Yamamoto, correcting earlier accounts that attributed such work to him.

== Reception and legacy ==
In a 1990 exhibition catalogue edited by the Nagoya City Art Museum, Yoru no Funsui was described as the last poetry journal in Japanese Surrealism to present itself as purely Surrealist.

In the catalogue accompanying a 2001 exhibition of Yamamoto's work, John Solt wrote that Yoru no Funsui "is now considered the greatest surrealist magazine in terms of paper quality."

In 2009, Yumani Shobō reproduced all four issues in facsimile in volume 3, Surrealism, of its series Collection: Toshi Modernism Shishi. The Museum of Modern Japanese Literature lists all four original issues in its holdings, while Doshisha University Library holds the 2009 facsimile edition.

The journal was shown at the Nagoya City Art Museum in the 1990 exhibition Surrealism in Japan: 1925–1945. In 2001, Kansuke Yamamoto: Conveyor of the Impossible at Tokyo Station Gallery included Yoru no Funsui among the materials shown alongside Yamamoto's photographs. Issues 1 and 2 were shown at Itabashi Art Museum in 2024 in The 100th Anniversary of "Manifeste du Surréalisme": Surrealism and Japan.

== See also ==
- Kansuke Yamamoto
- Chirū Yamanaka
- Surrealist photography in Japan
- Surrealism in Japan
- Surrealism in Nagoya
- Wartime repression of Surrealism in Japan
- Photography in Japan
