= Special Higher Police =

Imperial Japanese secret police force

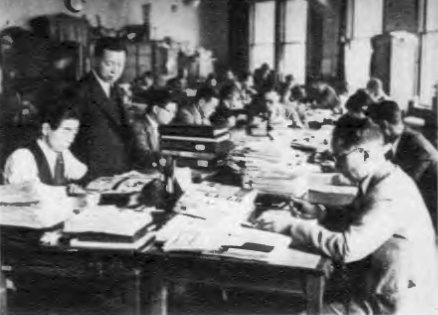
The censorship section of the Special Higher Police bureau of the Tokyo Metropolitan PD

The Special Higher Police (特別高等警察, Tokubetsu Kōtō Keisatsu), often abbreviated Tokkō (特高, Tokkō), was, from 1911 to 1945, a Japanese policing organization, established within the Home Ministry for the purpose of carrying out civil law enforcement, control of political groups and ideologies deemed to threaten the public order of the Empire of Japan, counterintelligence, domestic criminal investigations, high policing, and public security. As the civilian counterpart to the military police forces of the Kenpeitai (army) and of the Tokkeitai (navy), the Tokkō's functions were counter espionage and criminal investigation. The Tokubetsu Kōtō Keisatsu was also known by various nicknames such as the Peace Police (治安警察, Chian Keisatsu) and as the Thought Police (思想警察, Shisō Keisatsu).

== History ==
=== Establishment ===
The High Treason Incident of 1910 was the stimulus for the establishment of the Tokkō under the aegis of the Home Ministry. With the Russian Revolution, unrest at home due to the Rice Riots of 1918, increase in strikes and labor unrest from the labor movement, and Samil Uprising in Korea, the Tokkō was greatly expanded under the administration of Hara Takashi, and subsequent prime ministers. The Tokkō was charged with suppressing "dangerous thoughts" that could endanger the state. It was primarily concerned with anarchism, communism, socialism, and the growing foreign population within Japan, but its scope gradually increased to include religious groups, pacifists, student activists, liberals, and ultrarightists.

=== Expansion ===
After the passage of the Peace Preservation Law of 1925, the power of the Tokkō was expanded tremendously, and it expanded to include branches in every Japanese prefecture, major city, and overseas locations with a large Japanese population (including Shanghai, London and Berlin). In the late 1920s and 1930s, the Tokkō launched a sustained campaign to destroy the Japanese Communist Party with several waves of mass arrests of known members, sympathizers and suspected sympathizers (March 15 incident).

The Tokkō was composed of six departments (Special Police Work, Foreign Surveillance, Koreans in Japan, Labor Relations, Censorship, Arbitration). In 1927, a sub-bureau was added, the Thought Section of the Criminal Affairs Bureau, to deal with the study and suppression of subversive ideologies. The Tokkō made use of both uniformed and non-uniformed officers, along with a large network of informants. These informants were often undercover officers infiltrating suspect organizations and acting as agents provocateur, or voluntary informants from Tonarigumi neighborhood associations. Counter-espionage activities also included monitoring external telephone and radio communications inside or outside Japan and nearby areas.

By 1936, the Tokkō had arrested 59,013 people, of whom 5000 had been brought to trial; about half of those received prison sentences. Prisoners were forced to write accounts of how they had become involved with "dangerous ideologies", rewriting these essays until their interrogators were happy with the work. These works then were used to prove their criminal involvement. In 1939, the Tokkō also scrutinized avant-garde cultural publishing; the Surrealist poet-photographer and publisher Kansuke Yamamoto was interrogated and was released on the condition that he cease publication of his art-poetry journal Yoru no Funsui (1938–1939).

=== Abolition ===
The Tokkō was abolished in October 1945 by the Allied Occupation authorities under the Removal of Restrictions on Political, Civil, and Religious Liberties. This directly led to prince Naruhiko Higashikuni's resignation as prime minister.

== Principal agents and officers ==
- Genki Abe

== Notable cases involving the Tokkō ==
- Investigation of the Sorge Spy Ring.
- Death by torture of the Hokkaido writer Takiji Kobayashi
- Sexual torture of Japanese Communist Party member Yukika Asanuma (浅沼雪香, later Seno Yukika; born March 1911 on Hachijō-jima), a cousin of socialist politician Inejirō Asanuma. A Tokyo City Electric Bureau bus conductor who had joined the party in July 1928, she was arrested on 16 April 1929 at age 18 by Tokkō officers while attempting to deliver relief funds to comrades and was taken to Honfuji Police Station. During nearly a month of detention (29 days) she was subjected to sexual torture by Tokkō officers and a prosecutor, a form of abuse later termed erotero in Japanese sources. She was forced to sign a false statement denying that any torture had occurred and suffered permanent injury (deafness in her left ear). Upon release she immediately resumed political activity, was arrested a further 18 times over the following 16 years, and continued her activism into the postwar period.

== See also ==
- Kempeitai
- Tokubetsu Keisatsutai
- Japanese dissidence during the Shōwa period
- Political repression in Imperial Japan
- Police services of the Empire of Japan
- Gestapo
- Organization for Vigilance and Repression of Anti-Fascism
- List of historical secret police organizations

== Bibliography ==
- Botsman, Daniel V (2004). Punishment and Power in the Making of Modern Japan. Princeton University Press. ISBN 0-691-11491-9.
- Katzenstein, Peter J (1996). Cultural Norms and National Security: Police and Military in Postwar Japan. Cornell University Press. ISBN 0-8014-8332-8.
- Tipton, Elise (2001). The Japanese Police State: The Tokkō in Interwar Japan. Allen and Unwin. ASIN: B000TYWIKW.
