= Photo Times =

Japanese photography magazine (1924–1940)

- Native name: フォトタイムス
- Frequency: Monthly
- Publisher: Photo Times-sha
- First issue: 1924
- Final issue: December 1940
- Country: Japan
- Based in: Tokyo
- Language: Japanese

Photo Times (フォトタイムス) was a Japanese monthly photography magazine published in Tokyo from 1924 until December 1940. From 1929, under editor-in-chief Sen'ichi Kimura, it introduced recent developments in European and American photography through the "Modern Photo Section" (モダーン・フォトセクション). In 1938, the magazine supported the formation of the Avant-Garde Photography Association, and around the same time it also supported the Seinen Hodo Shashin Kenkyukai (青年報道写真研究会). In the late 1930s, Photo Times published essays and roundtables on zen'ei shashin (avant-garde photography). In 1941, as part of the wartime consolidation of photography magazines, it was renamed Hodo Shashin (報道写真).

== History ==
Photo Times was launched in 1924, with Sen'ichi Kimura serving as editor-in-chief in its early years. From the May 1929 issue, Kimura established the "Modern Photo Section" (モダーン・フォトセクション), a regular feature devoted to introducing recent developments in European and American photography. After Kimura left the magazine, the section continued under the next editor-in-chief, Tamura Sakae, and also carried contributions by writers such as Date Yoshio, Shimizu Hikaru, and Horino Masao.

Fujimura notes that, after Kimura's 1931–1932 trip to Europe and the United States, Photo Times reproduced works he had acquired abroad and ran his serialized "Obei shisatsu ryokoki" ("Travel notes from a tour of Europe and America") from December 1931 to March 1934. The National Diet Library records the magazine as a monthly periodical published in Tokyo by Photo Times-sha, with the title continuing through volume 17, number 12 (December 1940).

The Tokyo Photographic Art Museum states that gravure pages and features on overseas photographers in Japanese photography magazines, including Photo Times and Asahi Camera, introduced the work of Eugène Atget and Man Ray. Fujimura also records that the "Modern Photo Section" introduced photographers including Man Ray, Lee Miller, Charles Sheeler, and Herbert Bayer in 1932–1933.

== Avant-garde photography ==
From 1938, Photo Times published a series of essays and roundtables on avant-garde photography. The 2023 checklist for the Toyama Prefectural Museum of Art and Design exhibition "The Spirit of 'Avant-Garde' Photography" records Shūzō Takiguchi's "Shashin to chogenjitsushugi" ("Photography and Surrealism") in February 1938, "Shashin to kaiga no koryu" ("The Interchange Between Photography and Painting") in May 1938, "Buttai to shashin: toku ni shururearisumu no obuje ni tsuite" ("Objects and Photography: Especially on the Surrealist Object") in August 1938, and "Zen'ei shashin shiron" ("A Trial Essay on Avant-Garde Photography") in November 1938.

The same checklist records the symposium "Zen'ei shashin zadankai" ("Avant-Garde Photography Roundtable") in the September 1938 issue, as well as later texts by Takiguchi such as "Shashin no zokeiteki yoso ni tsuite" ("On the Plastic Elements of Photography") in May 1939 and "Shashin to zokeisei no saikento" ("Reconsidering Photography and Plasticity") in November 1940.

The Tokyo Photographic Art Museum states that the Avant-Garde Photography Association was founded in 1938 with the support of Photo Times.

== Nagoya ==
The Tokyo Photographic Art Museum states that the photography section of the Nagoya Avant-Garde Club became independent in 1939 as Nagoya Photo Avant-Garde, and that the poet-photographer Kansuke Yamamoto participated in the group. The museum also identifies Minoru Sakata as a central figure in the group and notes that he developed his photographic theory in magazines including Photo Times and Camera Art.

Ryūichi Kaneko notes that Photo Times and Camera Art frequently published work by members of the Nagoya Photo Avant-Garde. He also notes that Minoru Sakata's article "Shashin o suishin suru hitobito: Yamamoto Kansuke-shi" ("People promoting photography: Mr. Kansuke Yamamoto") appeared in the July 1940 issue and introduced Yamamoto's work, including Garan no torikago (Buddhist Temple's Birdcage). Kaneko cites Sakata's characterization of Yamamoto's attitude toward photography as that of "a poet of silver bromide".

== Wartime period ==
The Toyama checklist records the roundtables "Tairiku to shashin no zadankai" ("Roundtable on the Continent and Photography") in June 1939 and "Tairiku genchi hokoku zadankai" ("Roundtable on Reports from the Continent") in March 1940.

The Tokyo Photographic Art Museum also notes that Photo Times supported the formation of the Seinen Hodo Shashin Kenkyukai (青年報道写真研究会), whose members included Ken Domon, Shihachi Fujimoto, and Hiroshi Hamaya.

In 1941, during wartime consolidation of photography magazines, Photo Times was renamed Hodo Shashin ('Photo journalism'), subsequently stopping its coverage of avant-garde photography.

== See also ==
- Photography in Japan
- Surrealism in Japan
