= Kaigai Chōgenjitsushugi Sakuhinten =

1937 touring exhibition of European Surrealism in Japan

Kaigai Chōgenjitsushugi Sakuhin Ten
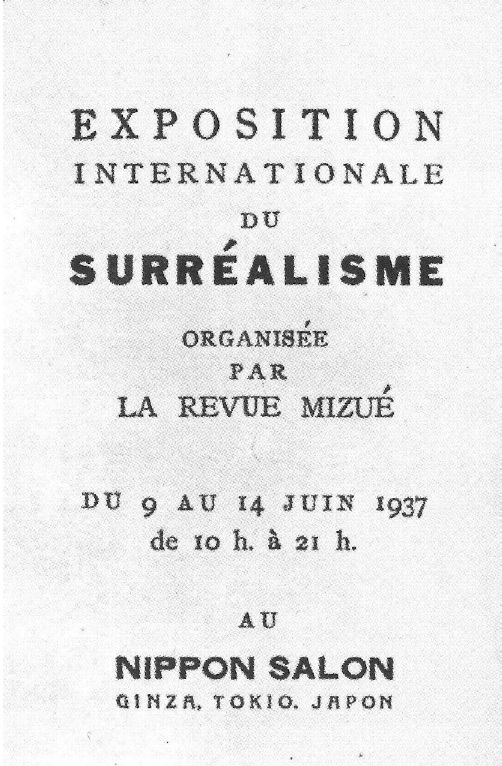
- French-language invitation to the exhibition, 1937
- 1937 touring exhibition of European Surrealism in Japan
- 海外超現実主義作品展
- Country: Japan
- Location: Nihon Salon (Japan Salon), Ginza, Tokyo, Japan
- Opened: Tokyo (Nihon Salon), 10–14 June 1937
- Via: Kyoto; Osaka; Nagoya; Kanazawa (June–July 1937)
- Closed: Kanazawa (July 1937)
- Exhibited: 377 works (original works and photographic reproductions)
- Curator: Shūzō Takiguchi; Chirū Yamanaka
- Organiser: Shunchōkai (publisher of Mizue)
- Sponsor: Masao Ōshita (editor-in-chief of Mizue)

Kaigai Chōgenjitsushugi Sakuhin Ten (海外超現実主義作品展; "Exhibition of Surrealist Works from Overseas") was a touring exhibition that presented European Surrealist works and related materials in Japan in 1937. Its French title was Exposition Internationale du Surréalisme, and it is also referred to in English as the International Surrealist Exhibition in Japan.

It opened at the Nippon Salon (日本サロン) in Ginza, Tokyo, in June 1937, and subsequently traveled to Kyoto, Osaka, Nagoya, and Kanazawa through July. The project was planned by critic-poet Shūzō Takiguchi and the Surrealist artist Chirū Yamanaka, with support from Mizue editor-in-chief Masao Ōshita.

Conceived as a direct encounter with contemporary Surrealism, the exhibition drew on transnational correspondence networks and the circulation of printed documentation and photographic materials. Artscape notes that Yamanaka had cultivated ties with Surrealist figures such as Paul Éluard and André Breton, and that the organizers even contacted Alfred H. Barr Jr. at the Museum of Modern Art in an attempt to bring American Surrealist works to Japan, though this did not materialize.

Later scholarship has described the show as the first—and nearly the only—surrealist exhibition in Japan before the Second World War, while also emphasizing that the majority of the display consisted of photographic reproductions and printed materials rather than original works. In one contemporary accounting it comprised 377 items, spanning both originals (watercolors, drawings, and prints) and reproductions, and included works attributed to major Surrealist artists such as Max Ernst, Joan Miró, Salvador Dalí, Man Ray, René Magritte, and Giorgio de Chirico. In histories of Japanese avant-garde photography, the exhibition is also cited as an impetus for Surrealist experiments by poet-photographers, including Kansuke Yamamoto.

== Background ==
Surrealism emerged in Paris in the 1920s around the writer and critic André Breton, whose Manifeste du surréalisme (1924) articulated Surrealism as an exploration of dream and the unconscious and promoted techniques such as automatic writing. By the 1930s the movement circulated internationally through publications, correspondence, and exhibitions involving artists and writers such as Paul Éluard, Max Ernst, Joan Miró, Salvador Dalí, Man Ray, René Magritte, and Giorgio de Chirico.

In interwar Japan, Surrealism was received within the broader culture of Modernism. Scholar Yuko Ishii identifies poet-critic Shūzō Takiguchi as an important mediator who deepened Japanese understanding of Surrealism through criticism and translation, and who followed developments in European Surrealist exhibition culture in the pages of Mizue. Ishii also notes that, after the Great Depression, major international art exhibitions became rarer and Paris study and travel decreased; in this context the Paris–Tokyo New Art Exhibition (巴里―東京新興美術展覧会; Tokyo, 1932, then touring) offered one of the most substantial early introductions of contemporary European avant-garde painting in Japan and included original Surrealist works shown alongside other French modern art, strongly influencing younger Japanese artists.

The immediate prehistory of Kaigai Chōgenjitsushugi Sakuhin Ten lies in the intersection of such local precedents with transnational correspondence. Ishii writes that artist-poet Chirū Yamanaka—inspired by the Paris–Tokyo New Art Exhibition—developed plans for a Surrealist show in Japan, while Takiguchi pursued the possibility of an "international" Surrealist exhibition through his exchanges with Breton; from 1933 Yamanaka began a long-term correspondence with Éluard, and their combined networks helped realize the 1937 touring exhibition. Ishii further observes that the exhibition's French title (Exposition internationale du surréalisme) deliberately matched the naming of the interwar sequence of Surrealist "international exhibitions", situating the Tokyo show between the London International Surrealist Exhibition (1936) and Paris's Exposition Internationale du Surréalisme (1938).

== Planning and organization ==
The exhibition was planned by the critic-poet Shūzō Takiguchi in collaboration with the Surrealist artist Chirū Yamanaka. In later reminiscences, Yamanaka recalled that because he was living in Nagoya at the time, he entrusted the basic practical arrangements for mounting the Tokyo showing to Takiguchi and to Masao Ōshita (大下正男).

Ōshita—then editor-in-chief of the art magazine Mizue—supported the project, and the organizers placed particular emphasis on printed documentation. In addition to a small pamphlet listing the exhibits that was distributed during the run, the exhibition's principal catalogue took the form of ALBUM SURRÉALISTE—Kaigai Chōgenjitsushugi Sakuhinshū (『ALBUM SURRÉALISTE──海外超現実主義作品集』), issued as a special extra number of Mizue; scholarship notes that it was printed and published in May 1937, before the exhibition opened, and functioned as the show's substantive catalogue and representation.

The organizers relied on international correspondence and the circulation of photographs and printed matter to assemble the display. Research on the exhibition notes that it was initially conceived largely as a documentation-oriented “materials exhibition”, requesting from overseas groups photographs, catalogues, posters, and other printed matter; European Surrealists also sent original works such as drawings and collages, which became part of the final display. Artscape further reports that the organizers contacted Alfred H. Barr Jr. at the Museum of Modern Art in an attempt to bring American Surrealist works to Japan, though this did not materialize.

== Venues and tour ==
Kaigai Chōgenjitsushugi Sakuhin Ten opened in Ginza, Tokyo, in June 1937 and then toured other cities in Japan through July. Published summaries generally list the tour cities, while providing limited detail on venues and exact dates outside the Tokyo presentation.

City	Venue	Dates	Notes
Ginza (銀座), Tokyo	Nippon Salon (日本サロン)	10–14 June 1937	Opening venue in Tokyo.
Kyoto	—	June–July 1937	Touring city.
Osaka	—	June–July 1937	Touring city.
Nagoya	—	June–July 1937	Touring city.
Kanazawa	—	July 1937	Listed as a tour stop by artscape.

== Exhibition contents ==
=== Media shown ===
Contemporary descriptions characterize Kaigai Chōgenjitsushugi Sakuhin Ten as a large-scale introduction of overseas Surrealism in Japan, combining a small number of original works with extensive documentation and photographic reproductions. The Nagoya City Art Museum catalogue contrasts the 1937 tour with the broader Paris–Tokyo New Art Exhibition (1932), describing Kaigai Chōgenjitsushugi Sakuhin Ten as a deliberately Surrealism-focused selection intended to present the movement's core concerns. Ishii notes that the vast majority of exhibited items were photographs, many of them reproduction photographs of paintings and objects, rather than original works shipped to Japan. Artscape reports a total of 377 items, including watercolors, drawings, prints, and photographic materials.

According to Ishii, the exhibition was accompanied by a printed album that functioned as a de facto catalogue (ALBUM SURRÉALISTE—海外超現実主義作品集), issued in advance of the Tokyo opening, and the contents also included collaborative “cadavre exquis” works and documentation relating to the 1936 International Surrealist Exhibition in London (New Burlington Galleries).

Reported breakdown of media
Medium	Count	Notes
Watercolors	6	originals
Drawings	31	originals
Gouaches	3	originals
Collages	5	originals
Prints	16	originals
Frottage	2	originals
Photographs	295	largely reproductions of artworks/objects
“Cadavre exquis” collaborations	4	collaborative works
London exhibition record	4	3 photographs + 1 poster (New Burlington Galleries, 1936)
Portraits	7	category reported by Ishii
Children's paintings	4	category reported by Ishii
Manuscripts / literature	(not specified)	listed, but count not stated

=== Selected exhibited artists ===
Ishii states that the exhibition included works by 41 artists, and notes that much of the display depended on works and materials sent through European Surrealist networks. Artscape identifies a multinational selection spanning artists active in Paris and other European centres.

==== Artists active in Paris (selected) ====
- Max Ernst
- Yves Tanguy
- Joan Miró
- Pablo Picasso
- Hans Bellmer
- Man Ray
- Victor Brauner
- Salvador Dalí
- Dora Maar
- André Breton
- Alberto Giacometti

==== Belgium ====
- René Magritte

==== Czechoslovakia ====
- Jindřich Štyrský

==== United Kingdom ====
- Henry Moore
- Paul Nash
- Eileen Agar
- Humphrey Jennings

==== Italy ====
- Giorgio de Chirico

==== Additional organisers and suppliers ====
Ishii also notes the role of European Surrealist networks in assembling the exhibition, naming Paul Éluard, Georges Hugnet, and Roland Penrose among those involved in supplying works and materials.

== Catalogue and related publications ==
The exhibition was accompanied by a set of printed materials that helped frame the show as a transnational survey of contemporary Surrealist art. In addition to an exhibit list/catalogue (mokuroku), the organizers and their supporters issued an illustrated publication that functioned as a portable surrogate for the display itself.

=== Exhibition catalogue (mokuroku) ===
A slim catalogue titled 海外超現実主義作品展 (Kaigai chōgenjitsushugi sakuhin ten; "Exhibition of Surrealist Works from Overseas") was published by Shunchōkai on 10 June 1937.

=== Album Surréaliste (Mizue special issue) ===
In May 1937, the art magazine Mizue issued a special number titled Album Surréaliste (ALBUM SURRÉALISTE：海外超現実主義作品集), published by Shunchōkai and edited by Shūzō Takiguchi and Chirū Yamanaka.

Published ahead of the opening, the volume served as an illustrated, take-away "representation" of the exhibition—especially significant because much of the display relied on photographic reproductions and printed documentation. The Henry Moore Foundation's bibliography describes it as a 112-page publication (dated 20 May 1937) with Japanese text and French elements (including the title, bibliography, and list of exhibits), illustrating 125 works by 41 artists; it includes a short introduction to Surrealism, plates of exhibited items, brief artist biographies (including an entry for Henry Moore), a chronology and bibliography, and an exhibition list/index.

== Reception and impact ==
=== Contemporary reception ===
Contemporary commentary on the Tokyo showing survives only in limited quantity compared with larger, institutionally staged exhibitions of foreign modern art. In later analysis, Yuko Ishii notes that the extant reviews were mixed, and that more favorable responses tended to come from photographers rather than from the established fine-art establishment.

Ishii also emphasizes the importance of the venue in shaping who encountered the show. The exhibition was held at the Nippon Salon (Nihon saron), a small rental gallery in Ginza, Tokyo, which recent research has identified as a gallery opened by the photographer Kiyoshi Nishiyama; it was initially conceived as a display space for a “new photography” group. In this context, the likely core audience included photographers (including amateurs) as well as makers and critics interested in avant-garde art, situating the exhibition within the interwar media ecology discussed in histories of Photography in Japan.

=== Reproductions, print circulation, and the exhibition as a “portable archive” ===
Because the overwhelming majority of the display consisted of photographic reproductions and printed documentation rather than original works, the exhibition functioned not only as an “encounter” with Surrealism but also as a mobile archive of images and texts that could circulate across cities and through print culture. Ishii argues that, in the Japanese context of the late 1930s—when opportunities for direct, sustained contact with the European avant-garde were constrained—the exhibition's visual information spread rapidly among younger artists, in part because it arrived through reproducible media rather than through a small number of unique objects. The Nagoya City Art Museum catalogue describes the tour as an early introduction of Salvador Dalí to Japanese audiences, and suggests that it contributed to the popularity of Dalí-like meticulous realism. The same catalogue argues that reproduction photographs of three-dimensional Surrealist work—including Hans Bellmer's doll imagery, Surrealist "objects" associated with André Breton and Man Ray, and sculpture by Alberto Giacometti and Henry Moore—helped make Surrealism's possibilities beyond painting more legible in Japan and encouraged subsequent interest in object-based work and Surrealist photography.

=== Bridging Surrealism and Japanese avant-garde photography ===
The exhibition's reliance on photographic materials and its presentation within a gallery closely connected to photography communities helped make it a point of contact between Surrealism and interwar Japanese photographic modernism (often discussed under the label Shinkō shashin and related debates over “avant-garde” practice).

In later histories of Japanese avant-garde photography, the exhibition is also cited as a stimulus for Surrealist experiments by poet-photographers, including Kansuke Yamamoto.

=== Wartime pressures and cultural control ===
Ishii situates the exhibition within a political climate in which cultural and ideological control was tightening in late-1930s Japan, shaping both how Surrealism was received and how it could be discussed publicly. In this sense, the exhibition's “international” ambition and its dependence on printed and photographic mediation are also part of the story of modern art's negotiation with censorship and cultural control in the period leading into the Pacific War.

== Legacy ==
Later scholarship has continued to position Kaigai Chōgenjitsushugi Sakuhin Ten as a key prewar point of reference for the reception of European Surrealism in Japan, especially because the show circulated through a hybrid format of a small number of originals alongside extensive printed documentation and photographic reproductions.

In the catalogue of the international survey exhibition Surrealism Beyond Borders (2021–2022), Stojković argues that the 1937 tour “stimulated Surrealist activities across the country,” prompting both the reorganization of existing groups and the formation of new collectives with an explicitly Surrealist agenda.

The exhibition's catalogue publication—海外超現実主義作品集 (Album surréaliste), issued as a special number of Mizue—has remained an important documentary trace of what was shown, and continues to appear in museum library holdings and later exhibition documentation on Surrealism and photography-related materials in Japan, including the Thomas J. Watson Library holdings for Surrealism Beyond Borders.

In accounts of Japanese avant-garde poetry and photography, the 1937 tour is also cited as part of the Surrealist milieu that helped shape poet-photographers such as Kansuke Yamamoto.

Key legacies include:

- establishing a widely cited prewar reference point for international Surrealism's dissemination in Japan through exhibitions, magazines, and reproductions;
- leaving a durable documentary record in the form of Album surréaliste and related printed ephemera preserved in museum libraries;
- providing a documented context for subsequent Japanese Surrealist publishing and experiment, including Yamamoto's Surrealist art-poetry activities.

== See also ==
- Surrealist photography in Japan
- Surrealism in Japan
- Surrealism
- Surrealism in Nagoya
- Surrealist Manifesto
- André Breton
- Paul Éluard
- Joan Miró
- Salvador Dalí
- Man Ray
- René Magritte
- Giorgio de Chirico
- Toyen
- Museum of Modern Art
- Alfred H. Barr Jr.
- Photography in Japan
- Photography in Nagoya
- Shinkō shashin
- Photomontage
- Photogram
- Avant-garde
- Kansuke Yamamoto
