= Shinkō shashin =

Japanese modernist "New Photography" movement of the 1930s

- Branch: Photography
- Years active: late 1920s – mid-1930s
- Location: Japan

Shinkō shashin (新興写真; 'New Photography') was a movement in Japanese photography that came to prominence around 1930. Photographers used sharply focused close-ups, high and low camera angles, photograms and photomontage, in contrast to the soft-focus methods of pictorialist art photography. German New Objectivity was among the influences on the movement.

== History ==
In 1929, Sen'ichi Kimura began presenting overseas photography in the 'Modern Photo' section of Photo Times. The German International Travelling Photography Exhibition was held in Tokyo in April 1931 and Osaka from 1 to 7 July. It brought photographs from Film und Foto, held in Stuttgart from 18 May to 7 July 1929, to Japan. The exhibits included photograms, photomontages, photographs taken through microscopes and street scenes photographed with small cameras.

== Publications and photography clubs ==
=== New Photography Research Society ===
Kimura established the Shinkō Shashin Kenkyūkai (新興写真研究会; New Photography Research Society) in Tokyo in May 1930. Its members included Masao Horino, Yoshio Watanabe and Yoshio Date. The society published three issues of Shinkō Shashin Kenkyū (新興写真研究). Although the journal ended in 1931, the society held exhibitions until 1932.

=== Kōga ===
Kōga (光画) ran for eighteen issues between May 1932 and December 1933. Yasuzō Nojima met most of the publication costs, while Ihei Kimura and Iwata Nakayama joined him in starting the magazine. The first issue carried Nobuo Ina's essay 'Shashin ni kaere' (写真に帰れ; 'Return to Photography'). Ina criticised pictorialism and urged photographers to recognise the camera's mechanical properties. He joined the magazine's editorial group from the second issue. The magazine printed snapshots, photograms and photomontages, along with Japanese translations of writings by László Moholy-Nagy and Franz Roh. The magazine had a print run of about 500 copies.

=== Clubs in Kansai ===
The Naniwa Photography Club was founded in Osaka in January 1904. At the club's nineteenth Nanten exhibition in 1930, photographs by Kiyoshi Koishi prompted other members to move away from pictorialism. The Tampei Photography Club was formed in Osaka in February 1930 around Bizan Ueda; Nakaji Yasui joined later. Iwata Nakayama, Kanbei Hanaya, Kichinosuke Benitani and Seiji Kōrai were among the founders of the Ashiya Camera Club in April 1930. The club held its first exhibition in Osaka that month and published a yearbook for its first Tokyo exhibition in 1931.

== Photobooks ==
In 1932, Horino published Kamera: Me × Tetsu: Kōsei (カメラ・眼×鉄・構成), a book of photographs of industrial subjects. Koishi exhibited his series Shoka shinkei (初夏神経; 'Early Summer Nerves') at the Naniwa Photography Club's twenty-first exhibition in 1932. The series appeared as a book in 1933 and included photograms and photomontage.

== Later developments ==
During the 1930s, some photographers turned to documentary photography and photojournalism, while others pursued experiments influenced by Surrealism. Photography historian Kōtarō Iizawa discusses the early careers of Hiroshi Hamaya and Kansuke Yamamoto, who began taking photographs in 1930 and 1931 respectively. Hamaya made snapshots of Tokyo street life with a Leica, while Yamamoto formed the Dokuritsu Shashin Kenkyūkai (Independent Photography Research Association) in Nagoya in 1931.

== See also ==
- Photography in Japan
- Zen'ei shashin
- Avant-garde photography in Japan
