= I'd Like to Think While inside the Body of a Horse =

1964 photograph by Kansuke Yamamoto

- Artist: Kansuke Yamamoto
- Year: 1964
- Medium: Gelatin silver print
- Location: J. Paul Getty Museum, Los Angeles

I'd Like to Think While inside the Body of a Horse is a 1964 gelatin silver print by the Japanese artist Kansuke Yamamoto. The J. Paul Getty Museum holds the work, which measures 22.7 × 18.1 cm and has the object number 2009.17.18. The museum lists Uma no dôtai no naka de kangaete itai as an alternate title.

== Description ==
The Getty Museum's lesson on the photograph describes a translucent figure as appearing to walk within a birdcage and a smaller figure as appearing farther away. The lesson states that the birdcage is enlarged so that it can enclose the translucent figure and discusses this as a distortion of perspective.

A Getty background text on poet-artists uses I'd Like to Think While inside the Body of a Horse as an example of Yamamoto's "plastic poetry". The text states that Yamamoto and other Japanese Surrealists created such works by juxtaposing or layering photographic images.

== Birdcage motif and title ==
A chronology published for Yamamoto's 2001 retrospective at the Tokyo Station Gallery records that the Asahi Shimbun published a photograph by Yamamoto on 9 February 1964 as an illustration to Hideo Oguma's poem 「馬の胴体の中で考えていたい」.

Amanda Maddox discusses the photograph under the title I'd Like to Think While in the Body of a Horse in her 2013 essay on Yamamoto and Surrealism. Maddox writes that Yamamoto repeatedly used the birdcage in his photographs and poetry. She writes that the cage's oppressive symbolism remained relevant in this later photograph. She also suggests that the title was probably derived from a poem by Oguma.

Jelena Stojković discusses Yamamoto's 1940 Birdcage at a Buddhist Temple photographs as a critique of the silencing of critical thought. Stojković also relates those photographs to contemporary discussions of the Surrealist object and to the reception in Japan of Salvador Dalí's late-1930s paintings featuring a disconnected telephone receiver.

Majella Munro writes that Yamamoto's Buddhist-temple birdcages later "acquired frail human prisoners" in the post-war period.

== Exhibitions and reception ==
The Getty Museum records the photograph as having been exhibited in Japan's Modern Divide: The Photographs of Hiroshi Hamaya and Kansuke Yamamoto from 26 March to 25 August 2013. A print of the work was included in Nonaka-Hill's 2018 exhibition Kansuke Yamamoto in Los Angeles.

In 2024, Musée Magazine reproduced the photograph at the beginning of a review of Yamamoto's exhibition at Michael Hoppen Gallery in London.
