= My Bench =

1963 photographic sequence by Kansuke Yamamoto

My Bench (わたしのベンチ, Watashi no Benchi) is a 1963 photographic sequence by the Japanese poet-photographer and editor Kansuke Yamamoto. It was first shown in Tokyo in November 1963 as a twelve-part "photostory", and was published in Camera Geijutsu in April 1964 with an accompanying text by the artist. In History of Japanese Photography Magazines, 1874–1985, it is included in the section "Literature and photography".

== Background and publication ==
According to the chronology published in Yamamoto Kansuke: Conveyor of the Impossible, My Bench was exhibited at the Tokyo show Nagoya Five: Hitori no Onna at Fuji Photo Salon from 12 to 18 November 1963, where it was listed as a "photostory in 12 photographs". In April 1964, the work was published in Camera Geijutsu 11, no. 4, pp. 73–77, again as a twelve-part sequence, together with a prose text by Yamamoto. The same chronology records that it was also shown in the Nagoya venue of Nagoya Five: Hitori no Onna, held at the lobby of the Tokai Bank head office from 10 to 16 April 1964.

The 1964 chronology further places the work in a broader cluster of Yamamoto's interactions between poetry and photography. In the months around the publication of My Bench, he contributed photographic illustrations for poems printed in the Asahi Shimbun, including texts by Joachim Ringelnatz, Hideo Oguma, Ryōo Koike, Shizuko Machida, and Ichirō Andō.

== Form ==
In its magazine appearance, the work was printed under the English title "MY BENCH / K. YAMAMOTO". The published version consists of twelve photographs spread over five pages. Camera Geijutsu also printed technical data for the series, listing a Rolleiflex camera with a 75 mm Planar lens, Neopan SS film, a five-second exposure, and a mixed D-72/D-76 developer.

Yamamoto's accompanying text opens by saying that he does not much like talking about works, and then stages the explanation as an exchange with a viewer. Across the text, recurring motifs such as a bench, a fallen star, a passing woman, and a "finale" give the sequence a narrative frame rather than presenting the images as isolated photographs.

== Context and significance ==
Jelena Stojković situates Yamamoto's photo-narratives in the postwar period, writing that works such as It Is Raining In Town, My Room Is, Full of Fragments and My Thin-Aired Room (both 1956) used staged photographs to convey dream-like narrative, and noting Kōtarō Iizawa's argument that these sequences predated the better-known narrative works of the American photographer Duane Michals. Seen against that background, My Bench marks a later development of Yamamoto's postwar sequence-based practice: it was made in 1963 and first shown as a twelve-part photostory, several years before Michals began producing the narrative sequences for which he became known in the late 1960s.

The work has also been framed within a history of literary-photographic experiment. In History of Japanese Photography Magazines, 1874–1985, it appears in the section "Literature and photography", alongside works by Eikoh Hosoe, Hisae Imai, Nobuyoshi Araki, and Yutaka Takanashi.
