= Madam Q =

1950 photograph by Kansuke Yamamoto

Madam Q is a 1950 photograph by Japanese photographer Kansuke Yamamoto. A print of the work is held by the Tokyo Photographic Art Museum. The photograph was shown at the 10th Bijutsu Bunka Kyokai exhibition in 1950.

== Description and critical discussion ==
Amanda Maddox identifies the sitter as Yamamoto's wife and compares Madam Q directly with Man Ray's 1931 photograph La tête. She notes that the two photographs have similar compositions: in each image, a woman's head appears against a blank background and her hair spreads outward in waves.

Reviewing Japan's Modern Divide for photo-eye, Colin Pantall also makes the comparison and describes Madam Q as a development of the earlier photograph. Pantall describes the image as a portrait of Yamamoto's wife in which her hair streams above her disembodied head.

In 2014, Meghan Maloney included Madam Q among Yamamoto's works that she described as influenced by contemporary European artists.

== Exhibition and collection ==
The chronology in the catalogue for Kansuke Yamamoto: Conveyor of the Impossible, Yamamoto's 2001 retrospective at Tokyo Station Gallery, records that he exhibited three works, listed as Work A, Work B, and Work C, at the 10th Bijutsu Bunka Kyokai exhibition at the Tokyo Metropolitan Art Museum from March 10 to 21, 1950. One of the three works was Madam Q.

The J. Paul Getty Museum presented Japan's Modern Divide: The Photographs of Hiroshi Hamaya and Kansuke Yamamoto from March 26 to August 25, 2013. Madam Q was reproduced as plate 79 in the museum's catalogue of the same title.

The Tokyo Photographic Art Museum database describes its print as a gelatin silver print on developing-out paper measuring 254 × 228 mm. Art Platform Japan records the same year, medium, dimensions, and collection.
