= Carnet Bleu =

1941-1942 Japanese photography newsletter

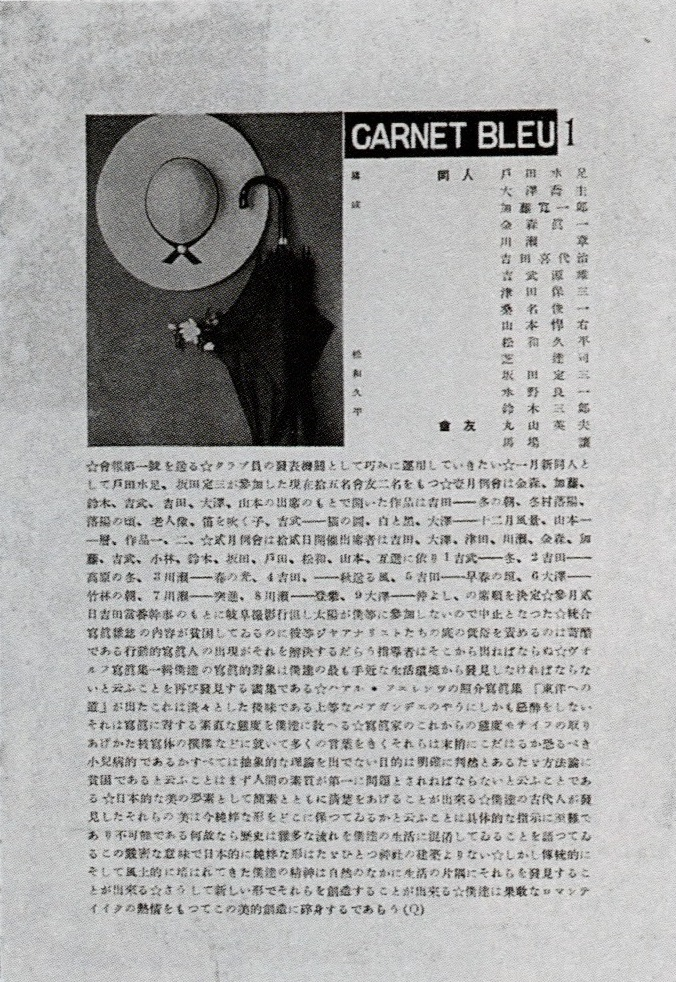
- Carnet Bleu (Blue Notebook), issue 1 (March 1941)
- Editor: Kansuke Yamamoto
- Categories: Photography, Surrealism
- Format: 220 x 150 mm
- Founder: Kansuke Yamamoto
- First issue: 25 March 1941
- Final issue Number: 10 August 1942; No. 5
- Company: Seidōsha
- Country: Japan
- Based in: Nagoya
- Language: Japanese

Carnet Bleu was a Japanese newsletter produced for the Nagoya photography group Seidōsha and edited by Kansuke Yamamoto. Its known run extended from no. 1, issued on 25 March 1941, to no. 5, issued on 10 August 1942. In studies of Yamamoto's work, it has been discussed as one of the outlets through which he continued avant-garde and Surrealist exchange after the suppression of his earlier journal Yoru no Funsui.

== Background ==
Seidōsha was formed in 1938 at Gorō Yamamoto's shop in Nagoya. By 1941, the group had fifteen members and two associates and continued to hold monthly photographic outings and meetings during the war.

After the final issue of Yoru no Funsui in 1939, and after police scrutiny brought that journal to an end, Yamamoto continued his publishing activity through outlets including Carnet Bleu and VOU. The Nagoya Photo Avant-Garde had already been renamed the Nagoya Photography Culture Association under wartime pressure and dissolved in 1941; in that same year Yamamoto began issuing Carnet Bleu for Seidōsha.

== Publication history ==
The Tokyo Station Gallery chronology records five known issues of Carnet Bleu, from 25 March 1941 to 10 August 1942. It describes the publication as four pages long, in a 220 x 150 mm format, printed on art paper folded once. Kaneko likewise describes Carnet Bleu as only four pages long and "perhaps more appropriately called a pamphlet". The Tokyo Station Gallery chronology notes that issues 2 and 3 are unlocated, while issues 4 and 5 are known only from proof copies. Around March 1942, the fourth issue included Yamamoto's memorial poem for a member killed in the war. The fifth and final issue, dated 10 August 1942, carried Yamamoto's Japanese translation of Philippe Soupault's essay État de la photographie, and the title remained in French through the last issue.

The first issue included short statements by Yamamoto, signed "Q" and "JQ", in which he criticized the state of contemporary photographic journalism and expressed dissatisfaction with the photography produced by study groups and the Bijutsu Bunka Kyōkai.

Jō Takeba later described Yamamoto's contribution to the first issue as a "poet's monologue" on the contemporary development of avant-garde and constructed photography.

Kaneko suggests that the issue may also have served as a small measure of emotional support for members of the group during the war.

== Significance ==
Amanda Maddox places Carnet Bleu within Yamamoto's publishing activity after the suppression of Yoru no Funsui, arguing that he remained committed to Surrealism and used later publications, including Carnet Bleu, to facilitate dialogue between artists in Europe and Japan. In that context, Yamamoto's translation of Soupault in the final issue is cited as part of the same post-1939 effort to maintain dialogue between artists in Europe and Japan.

Within scholarship on Yamamoto and prewar Japanese avant-garde photography, Carnet Bleu has been treated as part of the small-scale publishing activity through which Yamamoto sustained avant-garde practice during the wartime collapse of earlier photographic magazines and groups.

== See also ==
- Kansuke Yamamoto (artist)
- Yoru no Funsui
- VOU (magazine)
- Nagoya Photo Avant-Garde
- Surrealism in Japan
- Surrealism in Nagoya
