= Surrealist photography in Japan =

Photography in Japan associated with Surrealism

Surrealist photography in Japan refers to photographic practices in Japan associated with Surrealism, especially those that developed within the broader field of shinkō shashin in the 1930s. Rather than forming a single unified movement, it emerged through magazines, exhibitions, clubs, and overlapping regional networks linking photographers with poets, critics, and editors.

The field became more visible in the later 1930s, when experimental photography was increasingly discussed in relation to zen'ei shashin and wider avant-garde activity. Its late-prewar development was also shaped by censorship, surveillance, and the renaming or dissolution of avant-garde groups under wartime pressure. In later scholarship, Nagoya, particularly the work of Kansuke Yamamoto and the milieu around Yoru no Funsui and the Nagoya Photo Avant-Garde, has been discussed as one important case within the wartime history of Surrealist photography in Japan.

== Background ==
Surrealist photography in Japan developed within the broader rise of shinkō shashin in the early 1930s. The Japanese showing of the photographic section of Film und Foto in 1931, organized by Tomoyoshi Murayama and Okada Sōzō, helped define a new conception of photography in opposition to older pictorial conventions. Magazines, editors, and study groups then created the printed infrastructure through which experimental procedures could circulate more widely.

Within this broader modernist field, photographers experimented with collage, montage, photograms, solarization, and photographs of arranged objects. In a 1938 essay, Gingo Hanawa described two methods of Surrealist photographic expression: one used techniques associated with Man Ray, particularly photograms and solarization, to introduce automatism; the other used montage associated with Max Ernst and dépaysement (displacement).

== Media, exhibitions, and regional networks ==
Surrealist photography in Japan circulated through photographic magazines, exhibition reports, coterie publications, and clubs rather than through a single institutional center. For many works and debates, print was the primary site of circulation, and magazines were central to how experimental photography reached readers and critics in Japan.

The later 1930s brought a sharper public alignment between photography and Surrealism. The 1937 Kaigai Chōgenjitsushugi Sakuhin ten intensified discussion of Surrealism across literary and photographic networks and helped make experimental photography more visible within wider avant-garde culture. After the exhibition, the Avant-Garde Image Group was formed in Osaka in 1937, the Avant-Garde Photography Association in Tokyo in 1938, and the Nagoya Photo Avant-Garde and Société IRF in Nagoya and Fukuoka respectively in 1939. The groups held exhibitions and photographic outings and discussed Surrealist photography through photography magazines and contacts between regional groups.

== Wartime pressure ==
By the late 1930s, Surrealist photography in Japan was increasingly affected by censorship, surveillance, and official suspicion directed at overt avant-garde activity. Experimental work did not simply disappear, but it circulated under more unstable conditions, and some groups adopted different public labels or moved into less explicit forms of activity.

Nagoya provides a well-documented case of these pressures. In Nagoya, photography intersected with poetry, criticism, exhibition activity, and small-scale publishing through overlapping local circles rather than through a single specialized photographic institution. That concentration also made the milieu vulnerable when wartime controls intensified.

In 1938, Yamamoto and others launched Yoru no Funsui, which was banned in 1939; Yamamoto was interrogated by the Thought Police, and he could no longer continue the journal in that form. In the same year, the photography section of the Nagoya Avant-Garde Club was reorganized as the Nagoya Photo Avant-Garde, but in November 1939 the group changed its name to the Nagoya Shashin Bunka Kyōkai (Nagoya Photography Culture Association) in order to avoid attracting official attention. Yamamoto left the group by the end of that year as it moved in a more conservative direction.

Another publication associated with this milieu was the 1940 photobook Mesemu zoku, later described as a notable example of Surrealist photography in wartime Japan. Yamamoto's 1940 work Buddhist Temple's Birdcage, published in the second issue of Kōkaku together with the poem Garan no densetsu, presents a disconnected telephone receiver first inside and then outside a birdcage. Stojković discusses the work in relation to the Surrealist object and to the broader wartime narrowing of space for avant-garde practice.

== Postwar afterlives and historiography ==
After 1945, Surrealist photography in Japan did not continue as a unified postwar movement. Wartime destruction, the loss of negatives and original prints, and the disappearance of progressive photographic magazines left the field fragmented, while postwar realism and photojournalism came to dominate photographic culture.

Yamamoto formed VIVI in 1947, joined the photography division of the Bijutsu Bunka Kyōkai in 1949, and continued to publish work in VOU. Yamamoto, Keiichirō Gotō, Kōrō Honjō, Terushichi Hirai, and Hitori Yoshizaki continued to pursue avant-garde photography after the war. In 1956, they participated in the Japan Subjective Photography League and exhibited in the First International Subjective Photography Exhibition.

Later scholarship and exhibitions helped reconstruct this dispersed history. A major turning point was the 1990 exhibition Nihon no shūrurearisumu 1925-1945 at the Nagoya City Art Museum, followed by the fifteen-volume Korekushon Nihon shūrurearisumu published between 1999 and 2001. Jelena Stojković's Surrealism and Photography in 1930s Japan: The Impossible Avant-Garde (2020) was described by Lena Fritsch as the first English-language monograph devoted to Surrealist photography in Japan. Museum publications such as Japan's Modern Divide and Surrealism Beyond Borders further increased attention to the subject by placing Japanese photographic Surrealism within wider histories of modern photography and Surrealism.

== See also ==
- Surrealism in Japan
- Avant-garde photography in Japan
- Shinkō shashin
- Zen'ei shashin
- Surrealism in Nagoya
- Kansuke Yamamoto (artist)
- Nagoya Photo Avant-Garde
- Kaigai Chōgenjitsushugi Sakuhin ten

== Bibliography ==
- Fritsch, Lena (September 2021). "Surrealism and Photography in 1930s Japan: The Impossible Avant-Garde". The Burlington Magazine. 163 (1422).
- Fujimura, Satomi (2022). 前衛写真の時代 [The age of avant-garde photography]. In Tokyo Photographic Art Museum (ed.). アヴァンガルド勃興 近代日本の前衛写真 [Avant-Garde Rising: The Photographic Vanguard in Modern Japan] (in Japanese). Kokusho Kankōkai. pp. 192–195. ISBN 9784336073679.
- Hayami, Yutaka; Hironaka, Tomoko; Shimizu, Tomoyo, eds. (2024). 『シュルレアリスム宣言』100年 シュルレアリスムと日本 [100 Years of the Surrealist Manifesto: Surrealism and Japan] (in Japanese). Seigensha. ISBN 9784861529412.
- Stojković, Jelena (2020). Surrealism and Photography in 1930s Japan: The Impossible Avant-Garde. London: Routledge. ISBN 9781788314053.
- Munro, Majella (2012). Communicating Vessels: The Surrealist Movement in Japan, 1923-1970. Enzo Arts and Publishing Limited. ISBN 9781909046030.
- Keller, Judith; Maddox, Amanda, eds. (2013). Japan's Modern Divide: The Photographs of Hiroshi Hamaya and Kansuke Yamamoto. Los Angeles: Getty Publications. ISBN 9781606061329.
- D'Alessandro, Stephanie; Gale, Matthew, eds. (2021). Surrealism Beyond Borders. The Metropolitan Museum of Art; Tate Modern. ISBN 9781588397270.
- Takeba, Jō (2021). 「写真の都」物語―名古屋写真運動史 1911-1972 [Story of the "City of Photography": A History of the Nagoya Photography Movement, 1911-1972] (in Japanese). Kokusho Kankōkai. ISBN 9784336071989.
- Yamada, Satoshi (1990). フォト・アヴァンギャルドの動向 [Developments in the photo avant-garde]. In Nagoya City Art Museum (ed.). 日本のシュールレアリスム : 1925～1945 [Japanese Surrealism: 1925–1945] (in Japanese). Executive Committee of the Japanese Surrealism Exhibition. pp. 178–179.
