= My Thin-aired Room =

1956 photographic series by Kansuke Yamamoto

My Thin-aired Room (Japanese: 空気のうすいぼくの部屋, Hepburn: Kūki no Usui Boku no Heya) is a 1956 photographic series by Kansuke Yamamoto. The series consists of four staged photographs in which a figure and the room around him gradually disappear, creating a visual narrative that draws on Yamamoto's interest in Surrealism. The series has been discussed as a photographic reworking of René Magritte's Man with a Newspaper (1928). Kotaro Iizawa also discusses it as an early Japanese experiment in sequence photography, noting that it predates the better-known sequence works of Duane Michals by more than a decade. The J. Paul Getty Museum places the work among Yamamoto's postwar narrative series, while Stojković links these works to conceptual and performative uses of photography in postwar Japan.

== Description ==
The work unfolds as a four-part sequence set in an interior. Amanda Maddox describes the first image as showing Yamamoto himself seated in a room, the second as showing him gone but leaving his jacket and shoes behind, and the final image as emptying the room altogether, with even the furniture disappearing. Eiko Aoki similarly describes the series as four images in which a man gradually vanishes into thin air.

Kotaro Iizawa discusses the work not as a conventional documentary-style picture sequence but as a constructed series built around an impossible situation. He describes the seated "I" as beginning to disappear from the face in the first image; in the second, only the jacket and shoes remain; in the third, the jacket itself is fading; and in the fourth, even the table and sofa have vanished. Iizawa notes that the sequence might seem like a plausible story when described in words, but that seeing it as photographs leaves a strange aftereffect.

== Relation to Magritte ==
Maddox links the series directly to Magritte's Man with a Newspaper. She notes that Yamamoto copied the painting into his notebook from Julien Levy's 1936 book Surrealism, where it appeared with the alternate title "Now You Don't", and that it later served as a model for My Thin-aired Room. Yamamoto retained the four-part structure and the disappearance of a figure from an interior, but reworked them as a photographic sequence.

Aoki notes that the figure disappears differently in the two works. In Magritte's work, the man appears only in the first panel, while in Yamamoto's photographs he disappears gradually over the course of the sequence. Aoki also contrasts the lighter atmosphere of Yamamoto's photographs with the heavier texture of Magritte's oil painting. Aoki cites these differences when discussing Yamamoto's originality.

== Place in Yamamoto's postwar work ==
The J. Paul Getty Museum notes that Yamamoto developed narrative series during the 1950s and 1960s and includes My Thin-aired Room among them. Stojković points to a pair of self-portraits from 1949 as an early example of this approach, noting that similar compositions are used for artistic effect. In works such as It Is Raining In Town, My Room Is, Full of Fragments (1956) and My Thin-aired Room, three or more staged photographs form a dreamlike narrative, with Yamamoto taking the roles of both actor and director. Stojković writes that these experiments directly linked Yamamoto's Surrealist background with emerging conceptual and performative uses of photography in the postwar period.

Masachika Tani discusses The Forgotten Person (1957) as a five-image sequence in which a female figure changes and gradually disappears.

== Exhibition and publication history ==
John Solt includes My Thin-aired Room among Yamamoto's "dramatic sequence photos", which he describes as groups of three to five photographs arranged vertically or horizontally to form a narrative. Solt quotes Kitasono Katue's review of Yamamoto's solo exhibition at Matsushima Gallery in Ginza, which opened on 24 November 1956 and ran for one week. Kitasono singled out the four-panel photo story Kuki no usui boku no heya as the clearest expression of Yamamoto's originality.

The exhibition was shown the following month at Maruzen Gallery in Nagoya, from 7 to 12 December 1956. A review in The Asahi Shimbun described My Thin-aired Room as resembling a photo story and said the exhibition's experimental works showed an effort to break from conventional photography.

The series was reproduced as a four-print photo story on pages 24–25 of VOU no. 58 in November 1957. Yamamoto's chronology also records its reproduction in Solt's Shredding the Tapestry of Meaning in 1999. The work was later included in the 2013 exhibition Japan's Modern Divide at the J. Paul Getty Museum.

== Reception ==
In his 1956 review, Kitasono Katue described the series as a revelation for avant-garde photographers and wrote that this new form had enabled the camera to carry a poet's voice. Solt also notes that Yamamoto later exhibited sequence works in the postwar VOU milieu under the headings of concrete poetry and visual poetry. Solt argues that Kitasono's response to the series anticipated his later experiments combining poetry and photography as "plastic poetry".

Not all contemporary reviews were as enthusiastic. A January 1957 review in Shūkan Camera found Yamamoto's literary and lyrical world of fantasy interesting, but said that an artist working in this way needed to confront reality more rigorously.

Kōtarō Iizawa discusses My Thin-aired Room as an early Japanese example of sequence photography, noting that Duane Michals did not begin producing his better-known sequence works until the late 1960s, more than a decade later. Iizawa cites Solt's description of Yamamoto as an "ephemeralist" and finds a thin, fleeting atmosphere in the series, along with an attraction to ephemeral beauty. In a 2017 review, he described My Thin-aired Room and It Is Raining In Town, My Room Is, Full of Fragments as works that present a performance through a sequence of photographs. Stojković, citing Iizawa, also notes that Yamamoto's photo-sequences predate Michals's and compares the two photographers' use of photography for visual storytelling.

== Collections ==
Individual prints from the series are in the collection of the J. Paul Getty Museum. Getty's online collection currently lists at least three prints from the work, accessioned as 2009.17.12, 2009.17.13, and 2009.17.14. The Getty's exhibition page for Japan's Modern Divide also identifies My Thin-Aired Room as a 1956 gelatin silver print in the museum's collection.

== See also ==
- Kansuke Yamamoto (artist)
- Surrealist photography
- VOU
