= The Developing Thought of a Human... Mist and Bedroom and =

1932 photocollage by Kansuke Yamamoto

- 或る人間の思想の発展…靄と寝室と (Japanese)
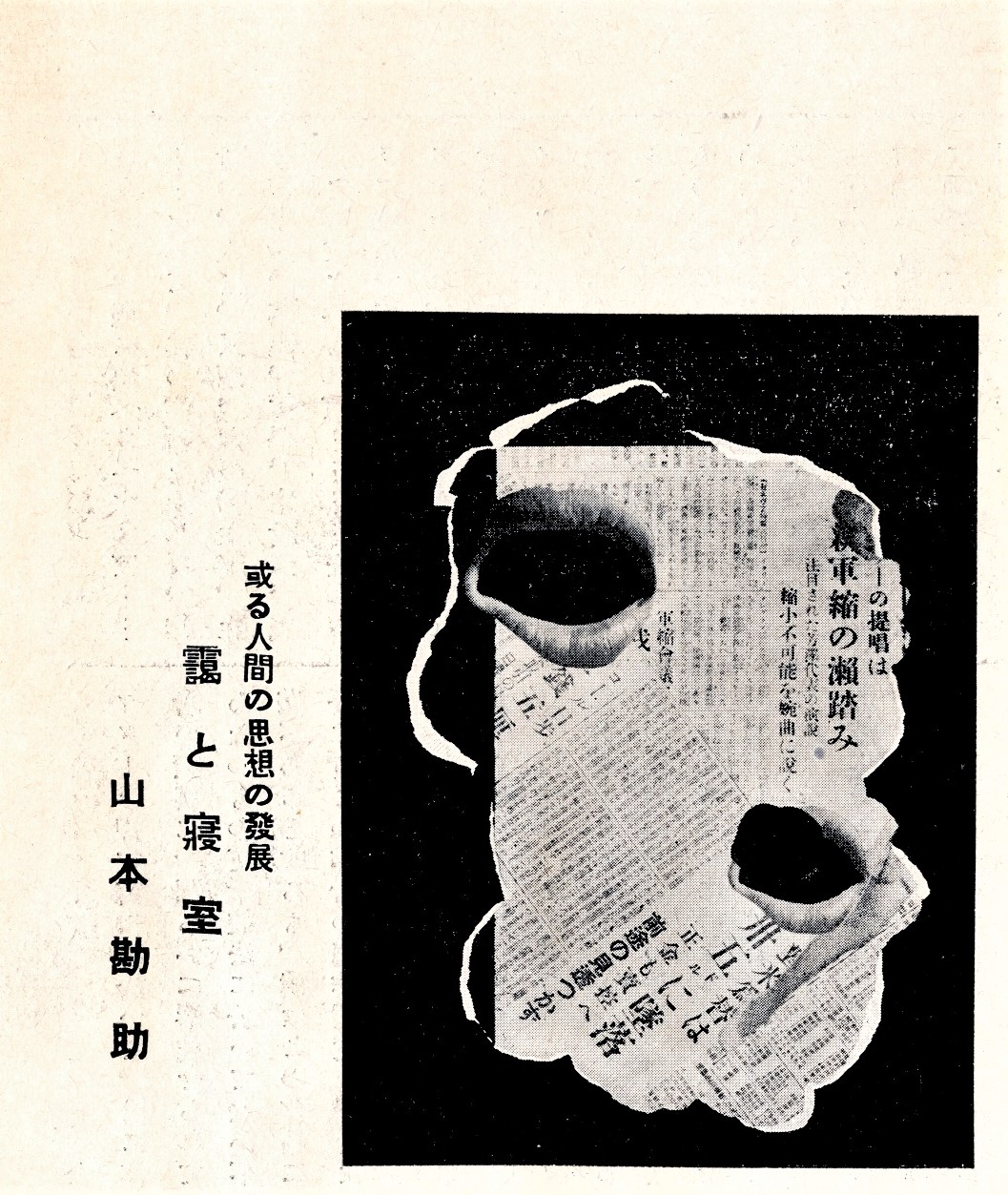
- Reproduction of Kansuke Yamamoto's photocollage as published in Dokuritsu B-2 (April 1932).
- Artist: Kansuke Yamamoto
- Year: 1932
- Medium: gelatin silver print and collage on paper
- Dimensions: 28.1 cm × 20.7 cm (11.1 in × 8.1 in)
- Location: Nagoya City Art Museum
- Accession: 2009.08.056.001

The Developing Thought of a Human... Mist and Bedroom and (Japanese: Aru ningen no shiso no hatten... moya to shinshitsu to; also translated as Development of a Man's Thought... Mist and Bed Room) is a 1932 photocollage by the Japanese photographer-poet Kansuke Yamamoto. The work is held by the Nagoya City Art Museum (accession no. 2009.08.056.001). In a review essay on the Getty exhibition Japan's Modern Divide, Eiko Aoki describes the work as combining contemporary newspaper clippings with cut-out photographic fragments, including close-ups of lips and parts of a woman's body.

== Background and publication ==
In Dokuritsu B-2 (5 April 1932), the bulletin issued by the Dokuritsu Shashin Kenkyūkai, Yamamoto reproduced the work under the Japanese title 或る人間の思想の発展...靄と寝室. The same issue also carried Yamamoto's accompanying text 題と主題（二）. Writing in the Getty catalogue Japan's Modern Divide: The Photographs of Hiroshi Hamaya and Kansuke Yamamoto, Ryūichi Kaneko notes that the work's year of creation long remained uncertain until research for the 2001 Tokyo Station Gallery retrospective Shashin-ten Shururearisuto Yamamoto Kansuke: Fukanō no dentatsusha established it as a work from 1932.

== Description ==
The Developing Thought of a Human... Mist and Bedroom and is a black-printed gelatin silver print on photographic paper whose center has been torn away to form an irregular opening, exposing newspaper clippings inserted beneath the surface. Across the newspaper fragments, Yamamoto pasted three photographic cutouts of lips, including one pair in the upper left and two overlapping near the lower right. He added a cutout of a woman's high-heeled leg beside the lips at lower right, and a small portrait-like head in the upper right. Kaneko notes that some headlines remain legible on the underlying newsprint, including items on arms-reduction diplomacy and the yen exchange rate. The resulting surface juxtaposes photographic fragments and newsprint in a collage format associated with Dada and Surrealist practice of the 1920s and 1930s.

== Interpretation and significance ==
Writing in the Getty catalogue Japan's Modern Divide: The Photographs of Hiroshi Hamaya and Kansuke Yamamoto, photography historian Ryūichi Kaneko characterizes the work as a Dada- and Surrealist-era collage and argues that its level of artistic expression is "on a par with that of any contemporaneous European artists". Kaneko notes that the work's year of creation long remained unknown until research for the 2001 retrospective Surrealist Yamamoto Kansuke established it as a work from 1932, when Yamamoto was eighteen years old. Kaneko argues that confirming the 1932 date shows Yamamoto as a precocious artist and treats the work as a landmark for rethinking the founding and development of modern Japanese photography in the 1930s. He further argues that Yamamoto did not adopt collage merely as a borrowed European avant-garde style but used it as a vehicle for sharp social criticism in the specific context of Japan, reading the inserted newsprint as reporting on the 1932 Geneva arms-reduction conference and the global economic crisis that followed the 1929 stock-market crash. In Kaneko's account, these clippings anticipate Japan's path from peace to war, including expansion after the Manchurian Incident and Japan's withdrawal from the League of Nations. Kaneko adds that, against this historical backdrop, Yamamoto arranged the repeated lips together with the cut-out face and leg as eerie elements "floating across the surface" of the collage, suggesting that the lips may be read as symbols of aggression or lust.

== Title and translations ==
The Japanese title recorded in the Nagoya City Art Museum collection database is 或る人間の思想の発展…靄と寝室と. Art Platform Japan lists the same work with the English rendering Development of a Man's Thought... Mist and Bed Room. In the Getty catalogue Japan's Modern Divide: The Photographs of Hiroshi Hamaya and Kansuke Yamamoto, Ryūichi Kaneko refers to the work in English as The Developing Thought of a Human... Mist and Bedroom and. In the Dokuritsu Shashin Kenkyūkai bulletin Dokuritsu B-2 (5 April 1932), the reproduction appears under the shortened Japanese title 或る人間の思想の発展...靄と寝室 (without the final to). These forms are treated by the cited sources as alternative renderings of the same 1932 photocollage by Kansuke Yamamoto.

== Collection and provenance ==
The work is held by the Nagoya City Art Museum, where it is catalogued under the Japanese title 或る人間の思想の発展…靄と寝室と and dated to 1932. The museum database records the medium as a gelatin silver print with collage on paper and gives the dimensions as 28.1 × 20.7 cm. The museum lists the accession number as 2009.08.056.001. Art Platform Japan, which aggregates collection information for works held by Japanese museums, also identifies the Nagoya City Art Museum as the holding institution and records the same accession number for Yamamoto's work, while providing the English rendering Development of a Man's Thought... Mist and Bed Room.

== Exhibition history and publications ==
The photocollage was first reproduced in Dokuritsu B-2 (5 April 1932), the bulletin issued by the Dokuritsu Shashin Kenkyūkai, under the Japanese title 或る人間の思想の発展...靄と寝室. Kansuke Yamamoto also contributed the text 題と主題（二） to the same issue of Dokuritsu. In the Getty Publications catalogue Japan's Modern Divide: The Photographs of Hiroshi Hamaya and Kansuke Yamamoto, Ryūichi Kaneko reports that the work's year of creation long remained uncertain until research for the Tokyo Station Gallery retrospective Shashin-ten Shururearisuto Yamamoto Kansuke: Fukanō no dentatsusha (22 August–24 September 2001) established it as a work from 1932. The photocollage is reproduced as plate 54 in the Getty catalogue Japan's Modern Divide, which presents Yamamoto's Surrealist-leaning experiments in dialogue with the documentary photography of Hiroshi Hamaya. It was reproduced again as fig. 9 in Eiko Aoki's review essay on the Getty exhibition in Trans-Asia Photography Review. The work has subsequently appeared in museum survey exhibitions of Japanese avant-garde photography and Surrealism.

- Shashin-ten Shururearisuto Yamamoto Kansuke: Fukanō no dentatsusha (Tokyo Station Gallery; 22 August–24 September 2001).
- Japan's Modern Divide: The Photographs of Hiroshi Hamaya and Kansuke Yamamoto (J. Paul Getty Museum, Los Angeles; 26 October 2013–25 February 2014).
- Aichi Art Chronicle 1919–2019 (Aichi Prefectural Museum of Art; 2 April–23 June 2019).
- "Shashin no miyako" monogatari: Nagoya shashin undo shi 1911–1972 (Nagoya City Art Museum; 6 February–28 March 2021).
- Avant-Garde Rising: The Photographic Vanguard in Modern Japan (Tokyo Photographic Art Museum; 20 May–21 August 2022).
- Surrealism and Japan (The Museum of Kyoto; 16 December 2023–4 February 2024).
- "Surrealism Manifesto" 100 Years: Surrealism and Japan (Itabashi Art Museum; 2 March–14 April 2024).
- "Surrealism Manifesto" 100 Years: Surrealism and Japan (Mie Prefectural Art Museum; 27 April–30 June 2024).

The Kyoto presentation and the later Itabashi and Mie venues represent the same exhibition project, documented in official lists of works and tour materials under closely related English titles.

== See also ==
- Kansuke Yamamoto
- Dokuritsu Shashin Kenkyūkai
- Surrealism in Japan
- Photomontage
- Japan's Modern Divide: The Photographs of Hiroshi Hamaya and Kansuke Yamamoto
