= Taruho Inagaki =

Japanese writer

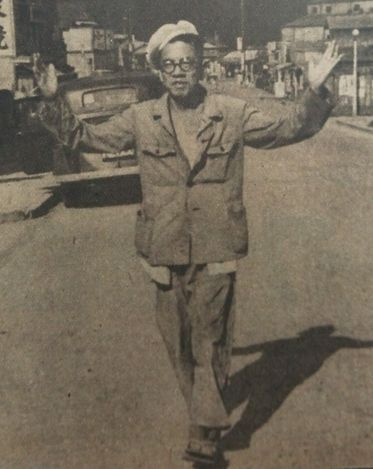
Inagaki Taruho

Taruho Inagaki (稲垣 足穂, Inagaki Taruho; December 26, 1900 – October 25, 1977) was a Japanese writer.

== Early life ==
Inagaki was born in Osaka, then moved to Akashi in Hyōgo Prefecture while he was in elementary school. He spent much of his childhood in Kōbe.

He graduated from Kwansei Gakuin Junior High School.

== Writing career ==
In 1923 Inagaki published One Thousand and One Second Stories (Issen ichibyō monogatari), and by 1926 he was counted among members of the short-lived Shinkankakuha group of writers.

In 1929, Inagaki was also among the contributors to Ciné, the avant-garde poetry magazine founded by Chirū Yamanaka, whose fellow contributors included Katué Kitasono and Shūzō Takiguchi.

In 1968 he won the first annual Japan Literature Grand Prize for Shōnen'ai no Bigaku (少年愛の美学, , The esthetics of boy-love), an essay on "aesthetic eroticism", where he divides stories into A (anal), V (vaginal), P (penile) and K (clitoral) varieties and "describe[s] the historical, psychological, and metaphysical ramifications of the love of beautiful boys in an eclectic blend of ideas culled from history, Freudianism, pop psychology, and existentialism."

== Themes and influence ==
Inagaki's works often dealt with themes including flight, astronomical objects, and erotic and romantic relationships among beautiful adolescent boys. His stories on the latter topic, and his essays in Shōnen'ai no Bigaku, were an influence on early writers of the yaoi genre such as Keiko Takemiya.
