= Sleepy Sea =

1953 photograph by Kansuke Yamamoto

Sleepy Sea is a 1953 gelatin silver print by Japanese photographer Kansuke Yamamoto. The photograph shows a silhouetted head in profile with several objects inside it, including a toy gun marked "Japan". In the catalogue for the 2013 J. Paul Getty Museum exhibition Japan's Modern Divide, Amanda Maddox compares the photograph with René Magritte's 1928 painting The Reckless Sleeper and uses the comparison to discuss Yamamoto's adaptation of Surrealist imagery to modern Japan.

== Interpretation ==
Maddox identifies Magritte's The Reckless Sleeper as the likely inspiration for Sleepy Sea. She notes that Yamamoto omits Magritte's sleeping figure and replaces the stone-like form with a silhouetted head containing a group of objects; the necklace and marble appear relatively arbitrary, while the compass, pocket watch, and toy gun are more deliberate symbols.

The compass, Maddox suggests, may allude to André Breton; its missing needle may indicate a lack of direction. She links the gun marked "Japan" to Yamamoto's dissatisfaction with what she describes as Japanese acceptance of the postwar U.S. military occupation. Maddox also reads the title as suggesting that the figure is adrift in a dream, and describes the photograph as a pointed commentary on Japanese society by an artist who used Surrealism as a means of provocation.

In a 2013 CNN feature, Lauren Russell describes Yamamoto's photocompositions as political commentary and reports he was disheartened by Japan's signing of the 1951 security treaty, which allowed U.S. military forces to remain in Japan. Russell then discusses Sleepy Sea, noting that its title does not indicate what it refers to and pointing out the toy gun marked "Japan".

== Catalogue and exhibition history ==
The catalogue for the 2001 Tokyo Station Gallery exhibition Kansuke Yamamoto: Conveyor of the Impossible lists Sleepy Sea as no. 88. The catalogue gives the Japanese title as 眠りの海 and the English title as Sleepy Sea.

In the 2013 Getty catalogue, the photograph appears as plate 66, dated 1953 and measuring 37.6 × 31 cm.

The photograph was also included in the 2017 group exhibition Japanese Surrealist Photography at Taka Ishii Gallery Tokyo.
