= Ciné =

Japanese avant-garde poetry magazine founded by Chirū Yamanaka

- Editor: Chirū Yamanaka
- Categories: Avant-garde poetry magazine
- Founder: Chirū Yamanaka
- First issue: 1929
- Country: Japan
- Language: Japanese

Ciné was a Japanese avant-garde poetry magazine founded in 1929 by Chirū Yamanaka. In later accounts of Japanese Surrealism, it has been described as one of the media through which Yamanaka introduced and circulated Dada and Surrealism in Japan and promoted international exchange with European Surrealists.

== Founding and editorial networks ==
According to a City of Nagoya profile on Yamanaka, he founded and edited Ciné in 1929. The same profile lists contributors or associated writers including Iwao Kameyama, Inagaki Taruho, Katué Kitasono, Shūzō Takiguchi, and Yukio Haruyama. In this way, the magazine formed part of the literary and artistic milieu around Yamanaka that linked Nagoya-based writers to wider avant-garde currents.

== Surrealism and international exchange ==
The Dalí Foundation describes Ciné as one of the magazines through which Yamanaka enthusiastically disseminated Dadaism and Surrealism in Japan. The same source states that Yamanaka established contact with figures such as André Breton and Paul Éluard and promoted international exchange among them, making his publishing activity part of a broader transnational Surrealist network rather than a purely local undertaking.

== Reception in Nagoya ==
Accounts of Kansuke Yamamoto note that his interest in modernist art deepened through exposure to Ciné and to the writings of both Chirū Yamanaka and Shūzō Takiguchi. Getty scholarship states more specifically that, through the Surrealist poetry journal Ciné, Yamamoto came to know Takiguchi as well as Yamanaka. A later Taka Ishii Gallery biography likewise states that, after returning to Nagoya from Tokyo, Yamamoto acquainted himself with Yamanaka's poetry and with Ciné, a Surrealist poetry magazine associated with Yamanaka. In this sense, Ciné formed part of the literary pathway through which Surrealist ideas entered the Nagoya milieu later associated with Yamamoto's poetry, photography, and editing.

== Legacy ==
Ciné has been treated in later accounts as an early node in Japanese Surrealist publishing and as one of the foundations of Yamanaka's later activity as an organizer of international Surrealist exchange. Through Yamanaka's broader editorial and critical work, the magazine also forms part of the background to later Surrealist activity in Nagoya, including literary and photographic circles that would later involve figures such as Yamamoto.

== See also ==
- Chirū Yamanaka
- Kansuke Yamamoto (artist)
- Yoru no Funsui
- Surrealism in Japan
- Surrealism in Nagoya
- Katué Kitasono
- VOU (magazine)
