= Surrealism and Photography in 1930s Japan =

2020 book by Jelena Stojković

Surrealism and Photography in 1930s Japan: The Impossible Avant-Garde
- Author: Jelena Stojković
- Language: English
- Subject: Surrealist photography in Japan
- Publisher: Bloomsbury Visual Arts
- Publication date: 2020
- Publication place: United Kingdom
- Pages: 255
- ISBN: 978-1-78831-405-3

Surrealism and Photography in 1930s Japan: The Impossible Avant-Garde is a 2020 art history book by Jelena Stojković on Surrealist photography in Japan during the 1930s. It examines the subject through the histories of shinkō shashin ("new photography"), zen'ei shashin ("avant-garde photography") and zōkei shashin ("plastic photography"), drawing on primary sources and archival research. Reviewing the book in The Burlington Magazine, Lena Fritsch described it as the first English-language monograph on Surrealist photography in Japan. It was named Best Art Publication in the 2021 ICAS Book Prize, whose committee said that the study added a new perspective to both the history of photography and Japanese history.

== Publication and scope ==
The hardback edition was published in London by Bloomsbury Visual Arts in 2020 with ISBN 978-1-78831-405-3. A paperback edition was first issued in 2021 and is published by Routledge. The study covers the period between the Manchurian Incident of 1931 and the outbreak of the Pacific War in 1941, when censorship and political pressure increasingly affected avant-garde cultural activity in Japan.

Stojković places the book against what she describes as the fragmentary treatment of Surrealist photography in earlier histories of both photography and Surrealism. She notes that photographers such as Iwata Nakayama, Ei-Q and Nakaji Yasui had been the subjects of retrospective exhibitions, but argues that this had not produced a broader account of their relationship to Surrealism. Earlier accounts, in her view, more often identified individual Surrealist photographs within broader modernist categories or discussed particular photographers separately.

The book instead treats Surrealist photography as a dispersed field involving photographers, artists, critics, magazines, exhibitions and photo clubs rather than as the activity of a single organization. Its geographical scope includes Osaka and Nagoya as well as Tokyo, reflecting Stojković's argument that Japanese Surrealism developed through a decentralized network rather than around a single national centre. The study also follows the magazines and photographic organizations through which works and ideas moved between these different circles.

== Contents ==
The book is divided into three parts, which Stojković presents as interconnected layers of the account rather than as a strictly chronological history. Part I, "New Photography", examines the emergence of Surrealist approaches within shinkō shashin and includes a chapter on photo-collage. It places this development in the context of the expansion of modernist photography following the Japanese presentation of the Film und Foto exhibition in 1931 and considers the division between professional and amateur photographic practice.

Part II, "Avant-Garde Photography", focuses on zen'ei shashin in 1937 and 1938 and examines photographic criticism, representation, printed matter and experiments with objects. Stojković relates this phase to the increased visibility of international Surrealism in Japan and to the political conditions surrounding the beginning of the Second Sino-Japanese War. She discusses different regional approaches, including experiments with the Surrealist object in Osaka and collaborative activity in Tokyo and Nagoya.

Part III, "Plastic Photography", examines zōkei shashin through questions of materiality, abstraction, photographic technology and locality. Stojković argues that the language of photographic "plasticity" provided one way of maintaining the artistic ambitions of experimental photography in 1939 and 1940, when an openly avant-garde position had become increasingly difficult to sustain. Among the photographers and artists discussed across the book are Iwata Nakayama, Kiyoshi Koishi, Ei-Q, Nakaji Yasui, Terushichi Hirai, Minoru Sakata and Kansuke Yamamoto.

The subtitle "The Impossible Avant-Garde" refers to several problems developed in the study, including the absence of a unified Surrealist photographic group, the political risks attached to open association with Surrealism and the difficulty of applying European models of the avant-garde to modern Japanese art. The conclusion moves beyond the 1930s to consider the loss and reduced visibility of much prewar Surrealist photography after the war and later attempts to reformulate experimental photography in Japan. Stojković also considers connections between the prewar photographic avant-garde and experimental practices that developed after 1945.

== Reception ==
Fritsch described the book as a well-researched and detailed study and identified it as the first English-language monograph devoted to Surrealist photography in Japan. Her review appeared in the September 2021 issue of The Burlington Magazine.

The ICAS Book Prize committee selected the book as Best Art Publication in its 2021 English-language humanities awards. The committee said that Stojković's study added a new perspective not only to the history of photography but also to Japanese history. It also highlighted the book's original analyses and reproductions of more than fifty artworks and clippings from newspapers and journals.
