= Seidōsha =

Japanese photography group founded in 1938

- 青憧社
- Formation: March 1938
- Founders: Kansuke Yamamoto, Genyū Yoshitake, Shin'ichi Kanamori, and Kyūhei Matsuwa
- Type: Photography group
- Purpose: Photography and small-scale print culture
- Headquarters: Nagoya, Japan
- Official language: Japanese
- Publication: Carnet Bleu

Seidōsha (青憧社) was a Japanese photography group founded in Nagoya in March 1938 by Kansuke Yamamoto, Genyū Yoshitake, Shin'ichi Kanamori, and Kyūhei Matsuwa. Active during the late 1930s and early 1940s, the group later issued the newsletter Carnet Bleu and formed part of the small-scale network through which Yamamoto continued avant-garde photographic and editorial activity in wartime Nagoya.

== History ==
According to a 1972 account of photography clubs in the Chukyo region, Seidōsha was founded in March 1938 as a young photographers' group organized by Yoshitake, Kanamori, Yamamoto, and Matsuwa. A later profile of Yamamoto likewise states that he formed Seidōsha with Yoshitake and others in 1938 and later issued the group's bulletin Carnet Bleu. In later scholarship on Yamamoto, Seidōsha has been treated as one of the organizational settings through which he continued to pursue avant-garde photography after his break with Nagoya Photo Avant-Garde at the end of 1939.

== Organization and activities ==
A 1972 description of the group states that Seidōsha had twenty-one members and held regular meetings on the second Thursday of each month. Submitted works were limited to ''yotsugiri'' prints (a standard Japanese quarter-cut photo format, 254 × 305 mm), and selections were made by mutual vote, with ten works chosen at each meeting. The same account states that the group did not appoint a single instructor, discussed members' works collectively, required the approval of all members for admission, and placed particular emphasis on fellowship among its members. Its office was said to be located at the home of Kanamori Shin'ichi in Denma-chō, Nishi Ward, Nagoya.

A later chronology describes Seidōsha in its wartime phase as including Sakata Teizō (Kaoru Utsumi), with fifteen full members and two associate members, and states that it continued to hold monthly photographic outings and regular meetings even under wartime conditions. The same source characterizes the group as maintaining a relatively free atmosphere during those years.

== Carnet Bleu ==
Seidōsha issued the newsletter Carnet Bleu as its bulletin. A chronology in the 2001 Tokyo Station Gallery catalogue states that the first issue was published on 25 March 1941 and that five issues are known through the final number of 10 August 1942. The same source describes the publication as a four-page folded bulletin and notes that the second and third issues are untraced, while only proof copies are known for the fourth and fifth issues. Kaneko also notes that the final issue carried Yamamoto's Japanese translation of Philippe Soupault's essay "État de la photographie".

== Relationship with Kei'ichirō Gotō ==
A 1989 catalogue published by the Nagoya City Art Museum states that Kei'ichirō Gotō was not a member of Nagoya Photo Avant-Garde but became acquainted with Yamamoto around 1938 through Seidōsha, and that the two remained close thereafter. This connection later continued into postwar activity: a chronology in Japan's Modern Divide records that Yamamoto formed the photography group VIVI with Gotō, Minayoshi Takada, and Yoshifumi Hattori in 1947.

== Legacy ==
Although Seidōsha has received less attention than groups such as Nagoya Photo Avant-Garde, it remains important as a small but sustained site of avant-garde photographic and editorial activity in wartime Nagoya. It also provides an organizational frame for understanding Yamamoto not only as a photographer but also as an editor and group organizer, especially through its connection to Carnet Bleu and to later figures such as Gotō.

== See also ==
- Carnet Bleu
- Kansuke Yamamoto
- Keiichirō Gotō
- Nagoya Photo Avant-Garde
- Surrealism in Nagoya
