= One Thousand and One Second Stories =

One Thousand and One Second Stories (一千一秒物語, Issen Ichibyō Monogatari) is a collection of short stories by Inagaki Taruho. Published in 1923, the loosely connected stories are written in an idiosyncratic style, often presenting surreal situations and characters.

== Overview ==
One Thousand and One-Second Stories is considered an example of early Japanese modernism. Critic and translator Hiroaki Sato asserts that Taruho's style also resembles Futurism, Dadaism, Surrealism, and Expressionism, all of which were influential artistic movements of the time. The brief stories, some of which are only a sentence or two, are described as “fragmentary distillations of simple observations”. Most of the stories have a Japanese title, while a few are titled in French like Un Mémoire and Un Chanson ďEnfants. Celestial bodies appear throughout; shooting stars fall to earth and become everyday objects, and the moon acts as a recurring character known as “Mr. Moon”. According to the New York Times, Taruho’s “whimsical sketches are colorful and amusing, a mixture of vaudeville slapstick and primitive cartoon”.

Taruho is believed to have included an explanation for his stories' fanciful style with the final line of Un Énigme, in which the narrator exclaims: nonsenseisayhasavalue.

The book was first published in English in 1998.
