= Zen'ei shashin =

Japanese term and late-1930s movement label for avant-garde photography

- Branch: Photography
- Years active: Late 1930s–early 1940s
- Location: Japan
- Major figures: Kansuke Yamamoto; Chirū Yamanaka; Yoshio Shimozato; Minoru Sakata; Shūzō Takiguchi
- Influences: Shinkō shashin; Surrealism

Zen'ei shashin (前衛写真; "avant-garde photography") is a Japanese term used in the late 1930s to name and debate experimental photography in Japan, particularly where modernist practice intersected with Surrealist ideas under intensifying wartime cultural controls. The label overlaps with, but is not synonymous with, the broader interwar modernist current known as shinkō shashin (新興写真, "New Photography").

Stojkovic notes that the word zen'ei (前衛) ("vanguard") carried political overtones in 1930s Japan, and distinguishes it from the loanword avangyarudo (アヴァンギャルド) used more narrowly for artistic movements. In her account, late-1930s discussion of zen'ei shashin included efforts to redefine "avant-garde" in ways that reduced its earlier political charge, reflecting the term's sensitivity under surveillance. A contemporary venue for this debate was the magazine Photo Times (フォトタイムス), which ran a 1938 roundtable on "avant-garde photography" and published essays on the topic by critics including Shūzō Takiguchi.

Japanese-language museum catalogues further describe wartime conditions as constraining overt "avant-garde" identification and encouraging alternative framings such as shashin zōkei (写真造形) ("photographic plasticity") and shashin bunka (写真文化) ("photography culture"). Stojkovic discusses the publication process of the Surrealist photography album Mesemu zoku (メセム属) (1940) as a concrete case in which "avant-garde" was displaced by "plasticity" (zōkei (造形)) as a contextual label in response to political pressures. Within this late-1930s usage, catalogues use zen'ei shashin in connection with research-oriented groups and regional collectives, including the Zen'ei Shashin Kyōkai (前衛写真協会) and the Nagoya Photo Avant-Garde (ナゴヤ・フォトアヴァンギャルド); Nagoya accounts also link the term's milieu to Surrealist poetry publishing such as Yoru no funsui (夜の噴水) (edited by the poet-photographer Kansuke Yamamoto).

== Scope and terminology ==
=== Etymology and political charge ===
The term zen'ei shashin combines zen'ei (前衛) ("vanguard") and shashin (写真) ("photography"). In English-language scholarship, Stojkovic notes that "avant-garde" circulated in Japanese both as the translation zen'ei (前衛) and as the loanword avangyarudo (アヴァンギャルド), and argues that the two could carry different associations: zen'ei was closely related to the idea of a proletarian vanguard, while avangyarudo more often denoted artistic movements and styles. She further observes that this distinction was not always clear-cut in practice, and that the political sensitivity of "avant-garde" language shaped how Surrealist and modernist culture could be described in public in the 1930s.

=== What "zen'ei shashin" names in this article ===
In this article, zen'ei shashin refers to late-1930s usage of "avant-garde photography" as a label for debate, self-positioning, and organization in Japanese photographic culture, rather than as a term for all experimental photography across the interwar period. Japanese-language museum catalogues use the term when discussing groups and circles that adopted "avant-garde" as a public identity (including the Zen'ei Shashin Kyōkai (前衛写真協会) and the Nagoya Photo Avant-Garde (ナゴヤ・フォトアヴァンギャルド)), as well as the magazine-mediated discourse in which their activity was described. Because sources describe wartime cultural controls as restricting the term itself and prompting renamings, this article treats later substitute framings—such as shashin zōkei (写真造形) ("photographic plasticity") and shashin bunka (写真文化) ("photography culture")—as part of zen'ei shashin terminology rather than as separate movements.

=== Relation to shinkō shashin ===
Shinkō shashin (新興写真, "New Photography") is treated in scholarship as the broader interwar infrastructure of modernist practice (magazines, amateurs, clubs, and technique transfer) within which Surrealist and avant-garde approaches developed. Zen'ei shashin overlaps with this milieu but is used more narrowly for a late-1930s moment of explicit "avant-garde" naming and dispute, especially where political pressures shaped how experimental photography could be framed publicly.

=== Romanization and variants ===
This article romanizes the term as Zen'ei shashin (with a straight apostrophe) and uses 前衛写真 when giving the Japanese form. Variant spellings (e.g., "Zen’ei shashin", "Zen-ei shashin", "Zenei shashin") are typically handled on English Wikipedia via redirects and explained in notes where relevant.

== Emergence as a movement label ==
The 1990 Nagoya City Art Museum catalogue treats the 1937 touring exhibition Kaigai Chōgenjitsushugi Sakuhinten (海外超現実主義作品展) (Exhibition of Overseas Surrealist Works) as a major encounter point for Japanese Surrealism, noting that it was jointly planned by critic Shūzō Takiguchi and poet–critic Chirū Yamanaka. In this museum framing, the exhibition helped establish shared Surrealist reference points across cities, after which "avant-garde photography" became a more visible label for organizing photographic activity and criticism connected to Surrealism and modernism. Stojkovic further situates late-1930s "avant-garde photography" discourse as a site where photographers and critics negotiated Surrealist procedures alongside competing emphases on abstraction and constructive form.

== Circuits and representative contexts ==
Stojkovic treats magazine culture and club activity as key infrastructures through which the label zen'ei shashin could circulate across cities as a shared term, rather than naming a single centralized organization. In this sense, the term appears in multiple overlapping contexts: photography magazines that connected amateur circles to national debate, research-oriented groups that adopted "avant-garde" language as a public identity, and (in some regional milieus) Surrealist poetry publishing that provided a parallel channel for introducing and discussing Surrealist ideas.

In Nagoya, the 1990 catalogue reports that the Nagoya Photo Avant-Garde (ナゴヤ・フォトアヴァンギャルド) formed in 1939 and includes the poet-photographer Kansuke Yamamoto among its members, presenting the group as part of a local circuit in which photographic activity was linked to Surrealist publishing and was also introduced to wider audiences through national photography magazines.

== Usage in print culture ==
Magazines were a primary venue in which zen'ei shashin was defined, contested, and made legible across cities in the late 1930s. Stojkovic treats such print-culture debate as central to how "avant-garde photography" could be discussed publicly under conditions in which the term itself was politically sensitive.

=== Photo Times and the "avant-garde photography" debate (1938) ===
A key site for explicit discussion was the magazine Photo Times (フォトタイムス), which devoted substantial space to the topic in a 1938 roundtable discussion on "avant-garde photography". In the same year, critics including Shūzō Takiguchi published essays addressing "avant-garde photography" in Photo Times, indicating that the term functioned both as an editorial category and as a critical problem to be argued in print. Stojkovic notes that late-1930s discourse around zen'ei shashin included efforts to redefine "avant-garde" in ways that reduced its earlier political charge, reflecting the term's sensitivity under surveillance.

=== Issues under discussion ===
In accounts of these late-1930s debates, recurring points of contention include:

- what should count as "avant-garde" in photography, and whether the label named a technique, an attitude, or a social position;
- how photographic "avant-garde" related to Surrealism and to other modernist tendencies, including abstraction and constructive form;
- how experimental work could be defended or described publicly when "avant-garde" language was politically exposed and increasingly constrained.

== Adoption as an organizational label ==
=== The label in group names ===
In late-1930s usage, zen'ei shashin functioned not only as a descriptive term but also as an element of public group identity, appearing in the names of research-oriented associations and regional collectives. Japanese-language museum catalogues discussing the period associate "avant-garde photography" (zen'ei shashin (前衛写真)) with groups such as the Zen'ei Shashin Kyōkai (前衛写真協会) and the Nagoya Photo Avant-Garde (ナゴヤ・フォトアヴァンギャルド) (Nagoya Photo Avant-Garde). The same catalogue context treats the Nagoya collective as a study- and critique-oriented circle that circulated its activity through national photography magazines such as Photo Times (フォトタイムス).

=== What zen'ei did for groups ===
Stojkovic notes that the word zen'ei (前衛) ("vanguard") carried political overtones in 1930s Japan, while the loanword avangyarudo (アヴァンギャルド) was often used more narrowly for artistic movements, and that late-1930s discussion of "avant-garde photography" involved attempts to manage this political charge. Within this framing, adopting "avant-garde" language in a group name could serve as a way to position collective activity within a recognizable modernist discourse across cities, even when participants held divergent aesthetic commitments (for example, differing emphases on Surrealism and abstraction). At the same time, museum-catalogue accounts of the period treat such overt "avant-garde" identification as increasingly risky under wartime cultural controls, which later restricted the term itself and encouraged renaming under alternative framings (discussed below).

== Wartime suppression and terminological shift ==
=== Prohibition and renaming ===
A 1990 Nagoya City Art Museum catalogue describes wartime cultural and ideological controls as making the word zen'ei (前衛) itself unusable, stating that the term was prohibited and that groups rebranded under alternative framings. In that account, the Zen'ei Shashin Kyōkai (前衛写真協会) was renamed the Shashin Zōkei Kenkyūkai (写真造形研究会), and the Nagoya Photo Avant-Garde (ナゴヤ・フォトアヴァンギャルド) was renamed the Nagoya Shashin Bunka Kenkyūkai (名古屋写真文化研究会).

=== What the replacement terms implied ===
The same catalogue comments on the shift in vocabulary, arguing that terms such as shashin zōkei (写真造形) ("photographic plasticity") and shashin bunka (写真文化) ("photography culture") indicated a relinquishing of Surrealism's rebellious spirit, and it frames this as part of a broader contraction in how experimental work could be publicly positioned under wartime conditions. It also characterizes the period as one in which photography was increasingly valued for documentary legibility—especially in the rise of "reportage photography"—rather than for autonomous "plastic" expression.

English-language scholarship offers a parallel example from publishing practice: Stojkovic discusses how, during the production of the Surrealist photography album Mesemu zoku (メセム属) (1940), the contextual term "avant-garde" was displaced by "plasticity" (zōkei (造形)) as political conditions tightened.

=== Narrowing of public space ===
The 1990 catalogue characterizes the prewar avant-garde photography movement associated with zen'ei shashin as reaching a peak in 1939 and then declining as wartime controls intensified and documentary/reportage priorities became dominant. In the same discussion, it describes the movement as short-lived overall, framing it as a four-year phenomenon (1937–1940) that was effectively buried by the wartime environment. Stojkovic similarly emphasizes that strict control was imposed on artistic activity during the late-1939 period in which Mesemu zoku was being printed, presenting publication constraints as one concrete site where political pressure reshaped avant-garde terminology and self-description.

== Case example ==
=== Nagoya: exhibition encounter and publishing response ===
One concrete setting in which late-1930s "avant-garde" language became newly salient was the circuit linking touring exhibitions and small publications in Nagoya. In July 1937, the touring Kaigai Chōgenjitsushugi Sakuhinten (海外超現実主義作品展) (Exhibition of Overseas Surrealist Works), organized by figures including Shūzō Takiguchi and Chirū Yamanaka, was shown at Maruzen in Nagoya; the Yamamoto chronology characterizes this local encounter as the immediate impetus for launching a Surrealist coterie magazine the following year. The same source preserves Yamamoto's later recollection that he attended the exhibition repeatedly, found public response limited, and discussed with Yamanaka the need to promote Surrealism through publishing—either by producing a "propaganda-like" magazine or by issuing a discreet journal centered on Surrealist work and translations.

In November 1938, Yamamoto edited and published the Surrealist poetry journal Yoru no funsui (夜の噴水) ("The Night's Fountain"), which ran for four issues through October 1939 and combined original writing, translations, and (from its first issue) photographic work. As a minimal pointer to earlier practice (without shifting this section into a works survey), the chronology also notes that Yamamoto had already published a photocollage in 1932 in the journal Dokuritsu (独立), indicating an early engagement with collage procedures later associated with avant-garde photographic experimentation.

== Reception and historiography ==
Later accounts of zen'ei shashin commonly treat the term itself as historically unstable and politically exposed, focusing on how its meanings and acceptable public uses changed under late-1930s surveillance and wartime cultural controls. Stojkovic emphasizes that "avant-garde" circulated in Japanese both as zen'ei (前衛) and as the loanword avangyarudo (アヴァンギャルド), and she treats this semantic split—together with the political overtones of zen'ei—as part of the context in which photographers and critics negotiated what "avant-garde photography" could mean in public discourse.

Japanese-language museum catalogues provide a complementary framing by treating terminology change as evidence of institutional pressure. The 1990 Nagoya City Art Museum catalogue states that "avant-garde" (zen'ei (前衛)) terminology was prohibited and links this to specific renamings of organizations (including the Zen'ei Shashin Kyōkai (前衛写真協会) and the Nagoya Photo Avant-Garde (ナゴヤ・フォトアヴァンギャルド)), describing substitute framings such as shashin zōkei (写真造形) ("photographic plasticity") and shashin bunka (写真文化) ("photography culture") as part of the wartime re-description of experimental photography.

In English-language scholarship, Stojkovic discusses the publication process of the Surrealist photography album Mesemu zoku (メセム属) (1940) as a concrete example of such pressures, arguing that the contextual term "avant-garde" was displaced by "plasticity" (zōkei (造形)) as conditions tightened. Across these accounts, zen'ei shashin tends to be treated less as a stable school style than as a late-1930s term for organizing debate and public identity in photography, whose meanings and permissible uses were reshaped by wartime constraints.

== Appendices ==
=== Terminology table ===
Japanese (script)	Romanization (this article)	Common English gloss	Notes
前衛 (zen'ei (前衛))	zen'ei	vanguard / avant-garde	Stojkovic notes that zen'ei (前衛) carried stronger political overtones in 1930s Japan than the loanword avangyarudo (アヴァンギャルド).
アヴァンギャルド (avangyarudo (アヴァンギャルド))	avangyarudo	avant-garde (loanword)	In Stojkovic's account, the loanword tended to be used more narrowly for artistic movements and styles (in contrast to zen'ei (前衛)).
前衛写真 (zen'ei shashin (前衛写真))	zen'ei shashin	avant-garde photography	Used in late-1930s discourse for debating and naming "avant-garde photography" (including in print culture and group self-description).
写真造形 (shashin zōkei (写真造形))	shashin zōkei	photographic "plasticity" / constructive form	The 1990 Nagoya City Art Museum catalogue treats "plasticity" and "photography culture" language as wartime-era substitute framings when "avant-garde" terminology became difficult to use publicly.
写真文化 (shashin bunka (写真文化))	shashin bunka	photography culture	Presented in the same catalogue as part of the wartime re-description of experimental photography; linked to renaming practices under cultural controls.

=== Chronology of the term (1937–1941) ===
Year	Term-related event	Sources
1937	The touring exhibition Kaigai Chōgenjitsushugi Sakuhinten (海外超現実主義作品展) is treated in the 1990 Nagoya City Art Museum catalogue as a key encounter point that shaped later Surrealist-related debate and activity, providing a shared reference field for later "avant-garde photography" discourse.	
1938	Photo Times (フォトタイムス) hosts an explicit roundtable discussion on "avant-garde photography" (zen'ei shashin as a debated label).	
1939	The 1990 catalogue reports the formation of the Nagoya Photo Avant-Garde (ナゴヤ・フォトアヴァンギャルド) and uses this context to discuss the late-1930s visibility of "avant-garde photography" as a movement label in Nagoya.	
Late 1939–early 1940s	The 1990 catalogue states that "avant-garde" (zen'ei (前衛)) terminology was prohibited and links this to renaming under substitute framings such as shashin zōkei (写真造形) and shashin bunka (写真文化).	
1940	Stojkovic discusses the publication process of Mesemu zoku (メセム属) as a concrete case in which the contextual label "avant-garde" was displaced by "plasticity" (zōkei (造形)) under tightening political pressure.	
1941	Stojkovic discusses Zōkei shashin (造型写真) as articulating a constructive/"plasticity" orientation that had become more publicly usable than overt "avant-garde" framing under wartime conditions.	

== Related concepts ==
In English-language scholarship, zen'ei shashin is typically discussed in relation to the broader interwar infrastructure of modernist photography known as shinkō shashin and to late-1930s debates about Surrealism and photographic form. Japanese-language museum catalogues further frame the term through the wartime shift from "avant-garde" naming to substitute public labels such as shashin zōkei (写真造形) ("photographic plasticity") and shashin bunka (写真文化) ("photography culture").

=== Wartime substitute framings ===
- Shashin zōkei (写真造形) ("photographic plasticity")
- Shashin bunka (写真文化) ("photography culture")
- Zōkei shashin (造型写真) (1941), discussed by Stojkovic as articulating a constructive/"plasticity" orientation within wartime constraints.

== See also ==
- Avant-garde photography in Japan
- Shinkō shashin
- Surrealist photography in Japan
- Nagoya Photo Avant-Garde
- Kaigai Chōgenjitsushugi Sakuhinten
- Shūzō Takiguchi
- Chirū Yamanaka
- Kansuke Yamamoto (artist)
- Surrealism in Japan

== Related concepts ==
- Shinkō shashin (新興写真)
- Avant-garde photography in Japan (parent overview)
- shashin zōkei (写真造形) and Zōkei shashin (造型写真) (1941)
- shashin bunka (写真文化)
