= John Solt =

American poet, translator, and scholar (1949)

- Born: November 6, 1949 (age 76); Cape Town, South Africa
- Known for: Work on Kitasono Katue and Yamamoto Kansuke
- Awards: Japan–U.S. Friendship Commission Prize for the Translation of Japanese Literature

Academic background
- Education: University of California, Santa Barbara; Sophia University; Gakushūin University; Harvard University

John Solt (born November 6, 1949) is an American poet, translator, publisher, and scholar specializing in the Japanese 20th-century avant-garde. He is an authority on the poets Kitasono Katue and Yamamoto Kansuke. Solt's work has focused on bringing the contributions of Japanese surrealists to an international audience.

== Early life and education ==
Solt was born to Hungarian Jewish parents, George and Maria Strausz, who had fled Hungary in 1944. The family emigrated to the United States in 1958 and settled in West Hollywood, California.

Solt graduated from Hollywood High School in 1967 and earned a Bachelor of Arts degree from the University of California, Santa Barbara (UCSB), graduating magna cum laude. While at UCSB, he studied under the poet Kenneth Rexroth, who introduced him to Japanese literature and the works of Kitasono Katue.

He earned a Master of Arts from Sophia University in Tokyo in 1980 and concurrently studied at nearby Gakushūin University. Solt then continued his graduate studies at Harvard University, where he received both a Master's and a PhD in premodern and modern Japanese literature. His dissertation on Kitasono Katue was supervised by Japan expert and translator Howard Hibbett, who was the director of the Edwin O. Reischauer Institute of Japanese Studies and served as his thesis adviser. Solt later turned the dissertation into his 1999 biography, Shredding the Tapestry of Meaning.

== Career ==
=== Scholarly Work ===
Solt is best known for his 1999 biocritical and cultural biography, Shredding the Tapestry of Meaning: The Poetry and Poetics of Kitasono Katue. A Japanese translation was published in 2010. The book explores Kitasono's "plastic poems," which combine visual elements and typography. In a review for The Journal of Japanese Studies, Leith D. Morton noted that Solt "gives English-language readers for the first time a detailed and comprehensive treatment of this major world poet." Miryam Sas, in her book Fault Lines, credited Solt as "a pioneer in the study of Japanese avant-garde poetry, and almost single-handedly brought this area of research its present legitimacy within Japan studies."

Solt has also focused on the work of photographer and avant-gardist Yamamoto Kansuke. In 2001, he co-curated the exhibit Yamamoto Kansuke: Conveyor of the Impossible at the Tokyo Station Gallery. He also contributed to the catalog for the J. Paul Getty Museum exhibition Japan’s Modern Divide: The Photographs of Hiroshi Hamaya and Kansuke Yamamoto (2013).

=== Poetry and Translation ===
Solt has published several collections of his own poetry, including The Memories Are More Than I Can Remember (1980), Anything You Don’t Want You Can Have (1988), and Underwater Balcony (1988). In 2020, a 700-page bilingual collection, Poems for the Unborn translated by Aoki Eiko, was published. Marjorie Perloff, an expert on avant-garde poetry, reviewed the collection, stating that “Solt has now published a beautifully produced volume of his own distinctive poetry… riddling short verses laced with humor and irony that makes the reader smile with a shock of recognition.”

His translation of Glass Beret: The Selected Poems of Kitasono Katue (1995) received the Japan-U.S. Friendship Prize for the Translation of Japanese Literature.

=== Curatorial and Archival Work ===
Solt has amassed a significant collection of Kitasono Katue's art, which is a major archival resource for scholars. In 2013, he collaborated with the Los Angeles County Museum of Art (LACMA) on Kitasono Katue: Surrealist Poet, the first solo retrospective of the artist in the U.S. All eighty works in the exhibition were drawn from Solt's collection.

He has also contributed to other art forms, including butoh. To commemorate the 100th birthday of dancer Kazuo Ohno in 2006, Solt organized festivals in several cities, including Tokyo, New York City, and Boston, which featured rare performance videos given to him by Ohno.

=== Academic Positions ===
Solt has held the following academic positions:

- Associate-in-Research, Edwin O. Reischauer Institute of Japanese Studies at Harvard University since 1990.
- Amherst College Assistant Professor of Asian Languages and Civilizations, 1990–97
- Lecturer, University of California at San Diego, 1998

=== Other activities ===
highmoonoon.com is a web hub Solt uses for other ventures. One is the publication of a 26-volume Festschrift in honor of Harvard Japan expert Howard Hibbett, his former teacher.

The John Solt Kitasono Katue Archive is a collection of materials on the Japanese poet and artist Katué Kitasono, and it is named after and was compiled by Solt.

== Personal life ==
Solt married Sachiko Sekine in 1973. They divorced in 2001. They have two sons. Ken Solt (named after Kenneth Rexroth) is the Edward Mallinckrodt Jr. Professor of Anaesthesia in the Field of Pharmacology at Harvard Medical School. George Solt is a historian and the author of The Untold History of Ramen: How Political Crisis in Japan Spawned a Global Food Craze. John Solt's older brother, Andrew Solt, is a film and television writer, producer, and director. He is also the owner of the complete video library of Ed Sullivan television shows. Solt's uncle, Andrew P. Solt, was a playwright and Hollywood screenwriter, best known for his script for the film noir, "In a Lonely Place".

== Bibliography ==
=== Poetry ===
- The Memories Are More Than I Can Remember (One Mind, Japan, 1980)
- Anything You Don’t Want You Can Have (X World Congress of Poets, Amarin Printing Group, Thailand, 1988)
- Underwater Balcony (Kaijinsha, Japan, 1988)
- Poems for the Unborn (Shichosha, Japan, 2020)

=== Scholarly work ===
- Shredding the Tapestry of Meaning: The Poetry and Poetics of Kitasono Katue (1902-1978) (Harvard University Asia Center, 1999)

=== Translations and Anthologies ===
- * Glass Beret: The Selected Poems of Kitasono Katue (translator and editor, Morgan Press, 1995)

== Awards ==
- Japan–U.S. Friendship Commission Prize for the Translation of Japanese Literature for Glass Beret: The Selected Poems of Kitasono Katue (1995)
