= Katué Kitasono =

Japanese poet, photographer, and editor

- 北園克衛
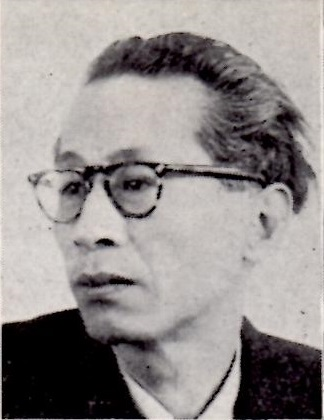
- Kitasono (date unknown)
- Born: October 29, 1902; Ise, Mie Prefecture, Japan
- Died: June 6, 1978 (aged 75)
- Occupations: Poet, photographer, editor
- Known for: Founding the VOU Club and the journal VOU; "plastic poems" (visual poetry)
- Movement: Dada; Surrealism; Concrete Poetry

Kitasono Katué (北園 克衛, Kitazono Katsue; October 29, 1902–June 6, 1978) was a Japanese poet, photographer, editor, and graphic designer associated with Dada, Surrealism, and visual poetry. He founded the VOU Club and its journal VOU in 1935, and later became especially known for his photographic "Plastic Poems" or "Plastic Poetry".

== Life and career ==
Kitasono was born in Ise, Mie Prefecture, Japan. According to background material prepared for a LACMA exhibition, he originally aspired to become a painter, but gained early attention as an avant-garde poet. Over the course of his career he also worked as a critic, graphic designer, magazine editor, and photographer.

In 1929, before founding VOU, Kitasono was among the contributors to Ciné, the avant-garde poetry magazine founded by Chirū Yamanaka.

== VOU ==
In 1935, Kitasono established the VOU Club and its avant-garde poetry journal VOU. VOU was published in 1935–1940 and 1949–1978, and invited a revolving group of poets alongside artists, composers, and architects. LACMA exhibition materials also emphasize Kitasono's activity as an editor and graphic designer for poetry and visual-art journals, including VOU.

Among the VOU circle's members was the photographer and poet Kansuke Yamamoto. In the postwar period, VOU-associated visual poets discussed in overviews of the group include Shōhachirō Takahashi, Motoyuki Itō, Toshihiko Shimizu, and Setsuko Tsuji.

== Surrealism, photography, and Plastic Poetry ==
LACMA exhibition materials describe Kitasono as a poet-artist whose early work was shaped by Dada and Surrealism, and emphasize his activity as an editor and graphic designer for poetry and visual-art journals, including VOU. The same materials note that his "Plastic Poems" belong to the broader field of visual poetry and appeared across his graphic output, including book covers.

A LACMA exhibition backgrounder further states that, in the mid-1950s, he began making what it calls "Plastic Poetry", a photographic genre he invented after being inspired by Surrealist photography by regular contributors to VOU. The backgrounder describes these works as photographs of tabletop arrangements of unrelated elements staged against clean, open space, and notes that Kitasono used such photographic "plastic poems" to replace textual poetry especially in works intended for an international audience.

== Yoru no Funsui and other editorial work ==
In 1938, Kitasono co-edited the Surrealist poetry journal Yoru no Funsui with the poet-photographer Kansuke Yamamoto and other poets.

== Archives and legacy ==
Material from Kitasono's library and related avant-garde holdings is preserved as the "Kitasono Katsue Library" (北園克衛文庫) at Tama Art University Art Archives Center.

== Scholarship and translations ==
English-language scholarship on Kitasono includes John Solt's Oceans Beyond Monotonous Space: Selected Poems of Kitasono Katue (halfmoonoon books, 2007), and a monograph Shredding the Tapestry of Meaning: The Poetry and Poetics of Kitasono Katue (1902-1978) (1999). Solt also translated a selection of Kitasono's poems as Glass Beret: The Selected Poems of Kitasono Katsue (1995), which received the Japan-U.S. Friendship Commission Prize for the Translation of Japanese Literature.

== See also ==
- VOU (magazine)
- Yoru no Funsui
- Kansuke Yamamoto (artist)
- Surrealism in Japan
- Visual poetry
- Shūzō Takiguchi
