= Hideo Oguma =

Japanese poet

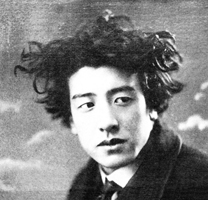
- Born: 9 September 1901
- Died: 20 November 1940 (aged 39)
- Writing career
- Literary movement: Proletarian literature

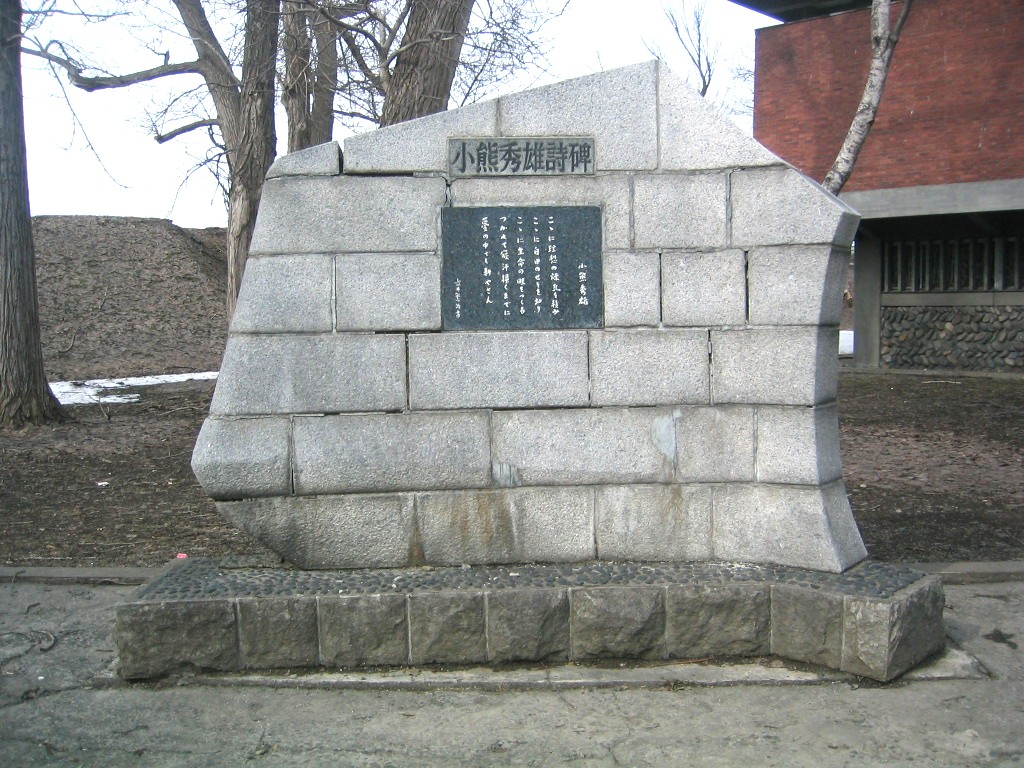
Oguma poem in Tokiwa Park in Asahikawa, Hokkaidō

Hideo Oguma (小熊秀雄, Oguma Hideo; 9 September 1901 – 20 November 1940) was a Japanese poet for the Proletarian literature movement and was noted for writing children's stories, comic books and literary criticism. A Hideo Oguma poetry prize is awarded for new poetry writers.

== Selected paintings ==
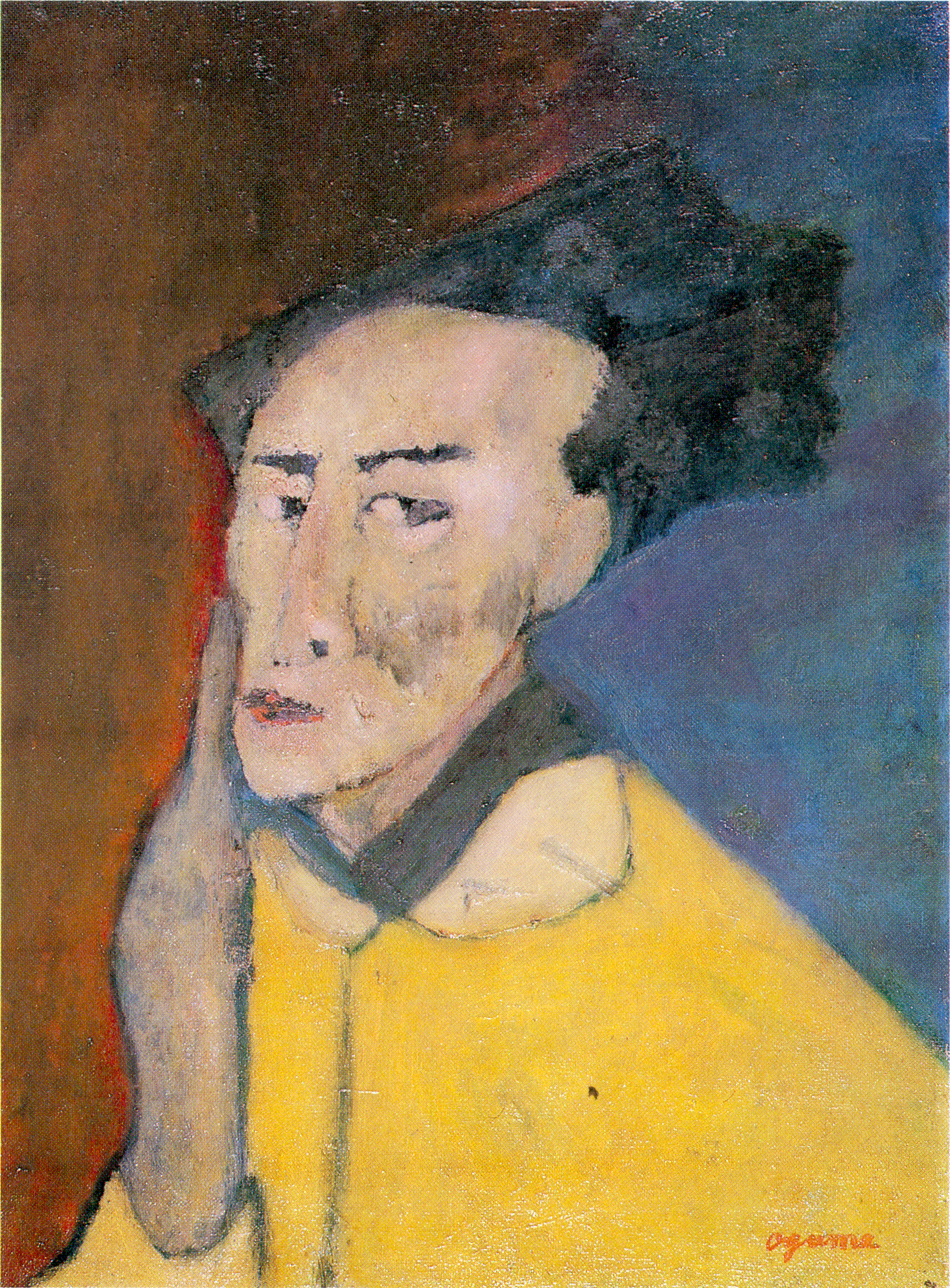
Self-Portrait (1938)

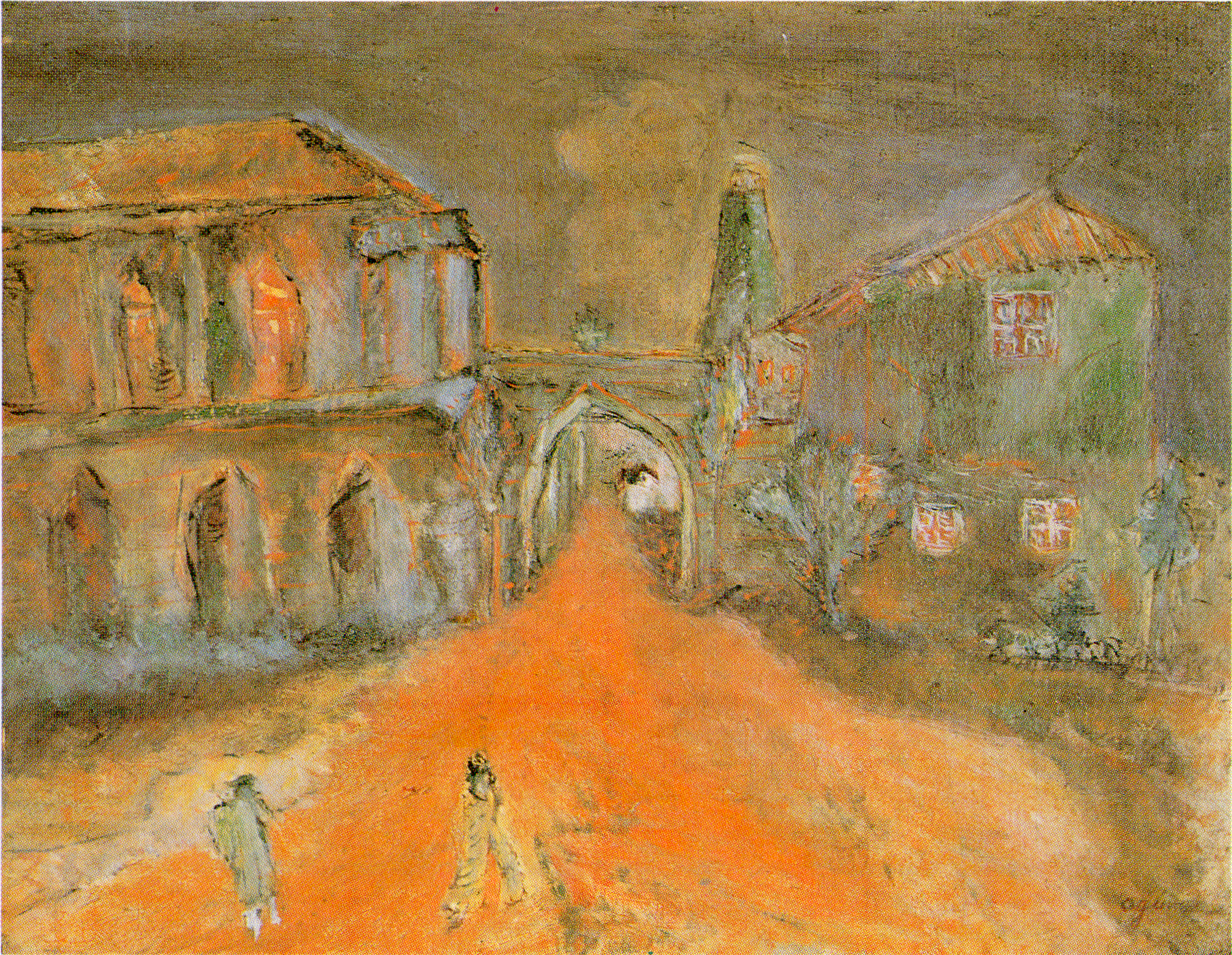
Rikkyō University in the Setting Sun (1935)

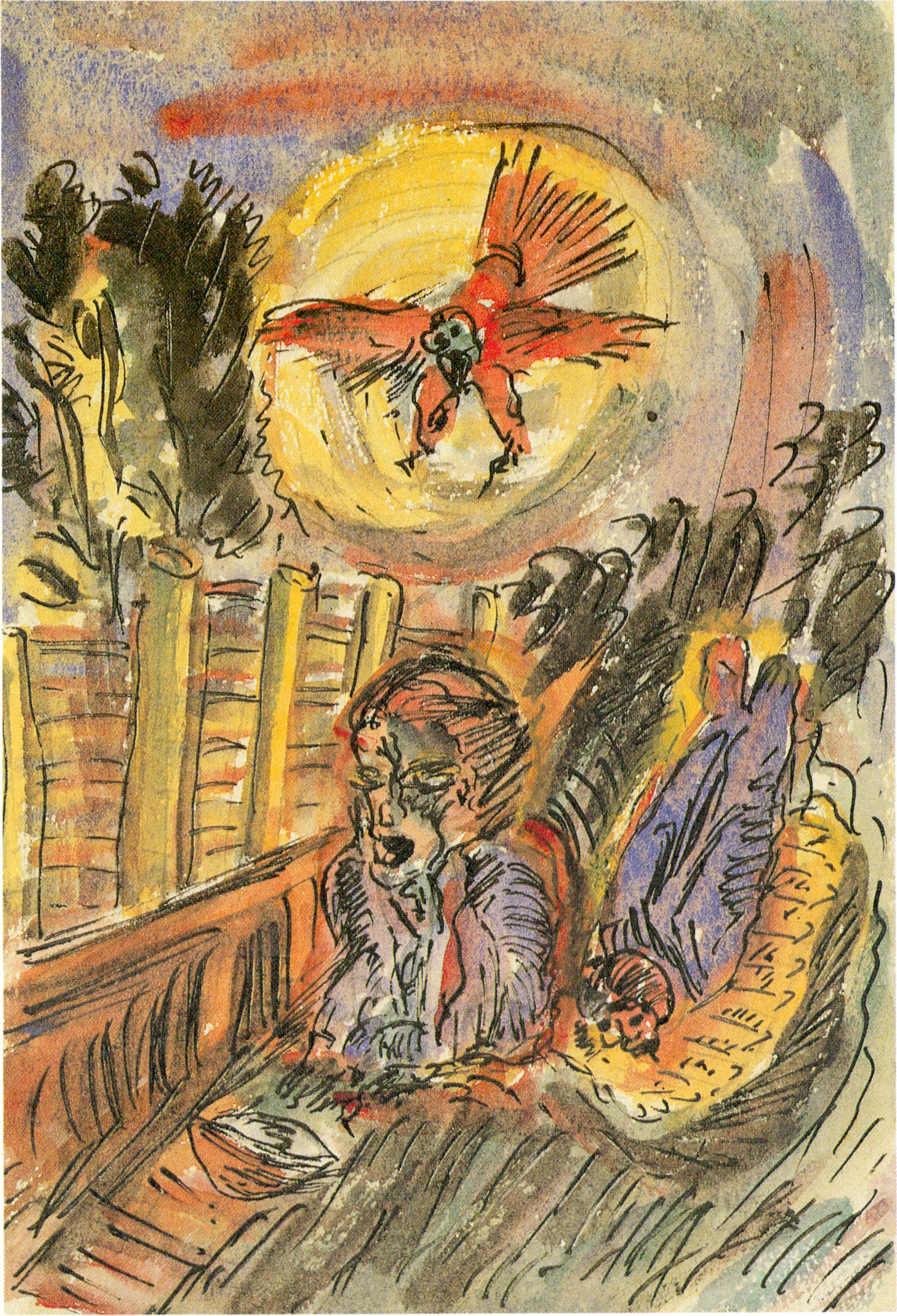
An Image to Shining Flight (unknown date)

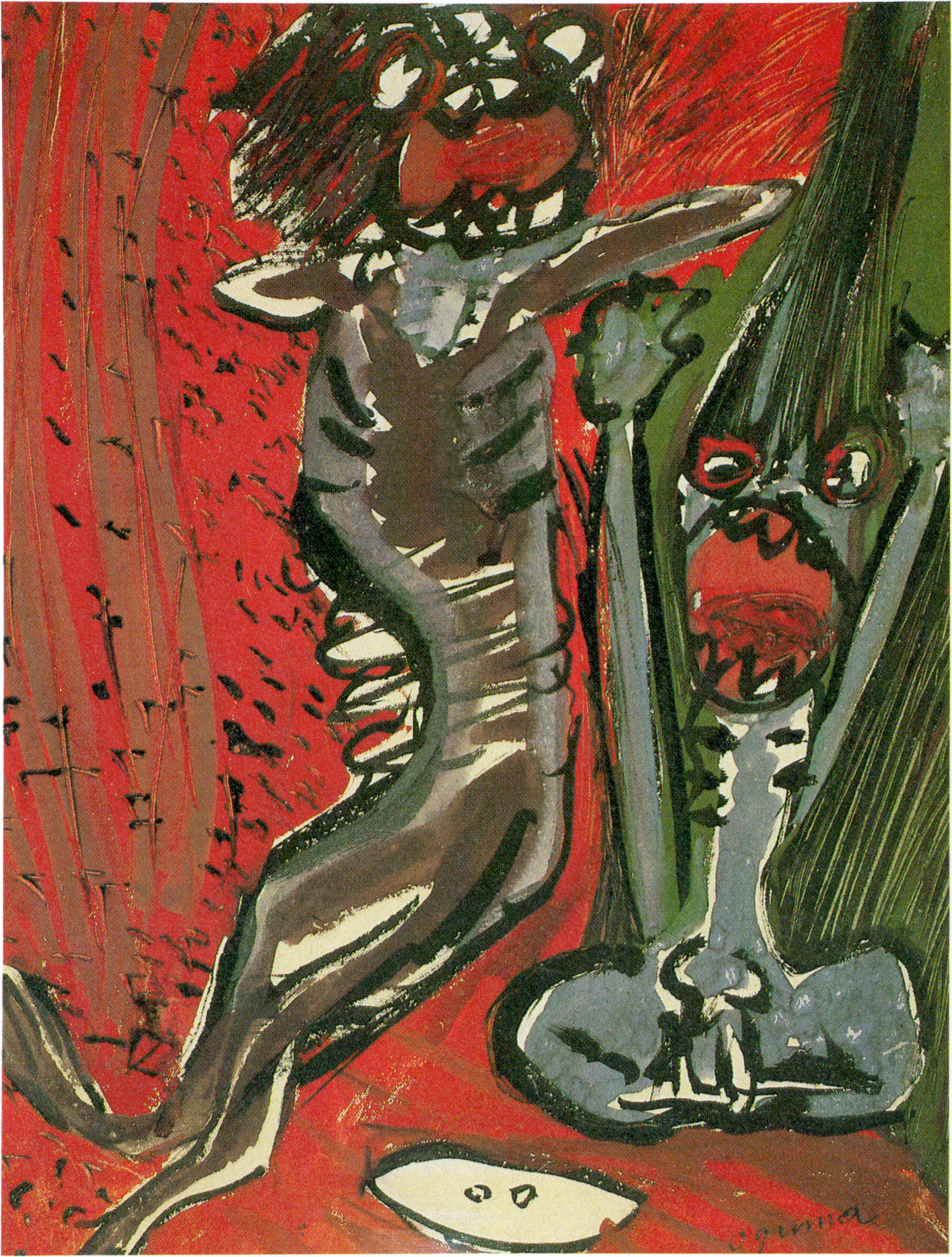
Starvation (unknown date)

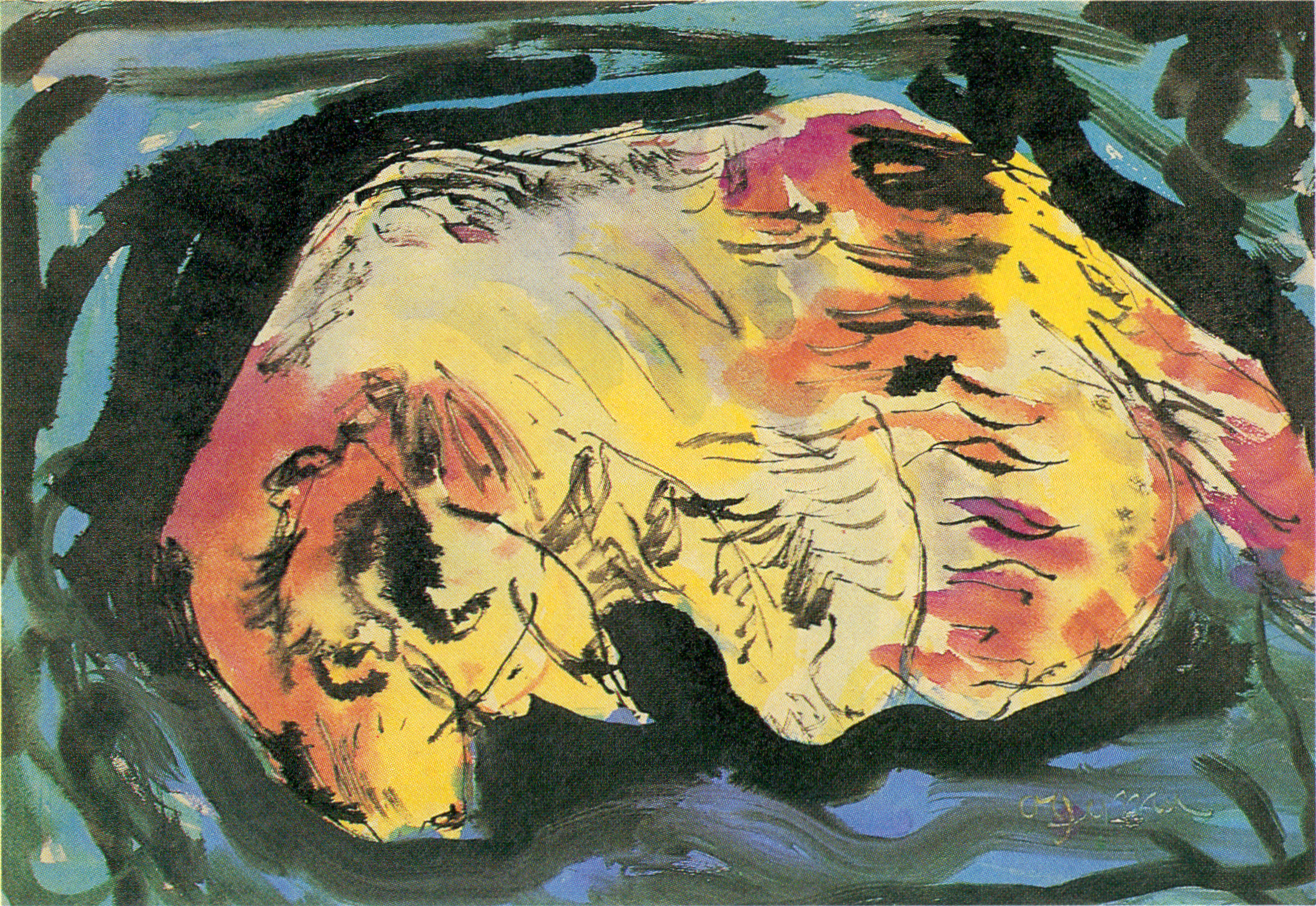
A Cat (unknown date)

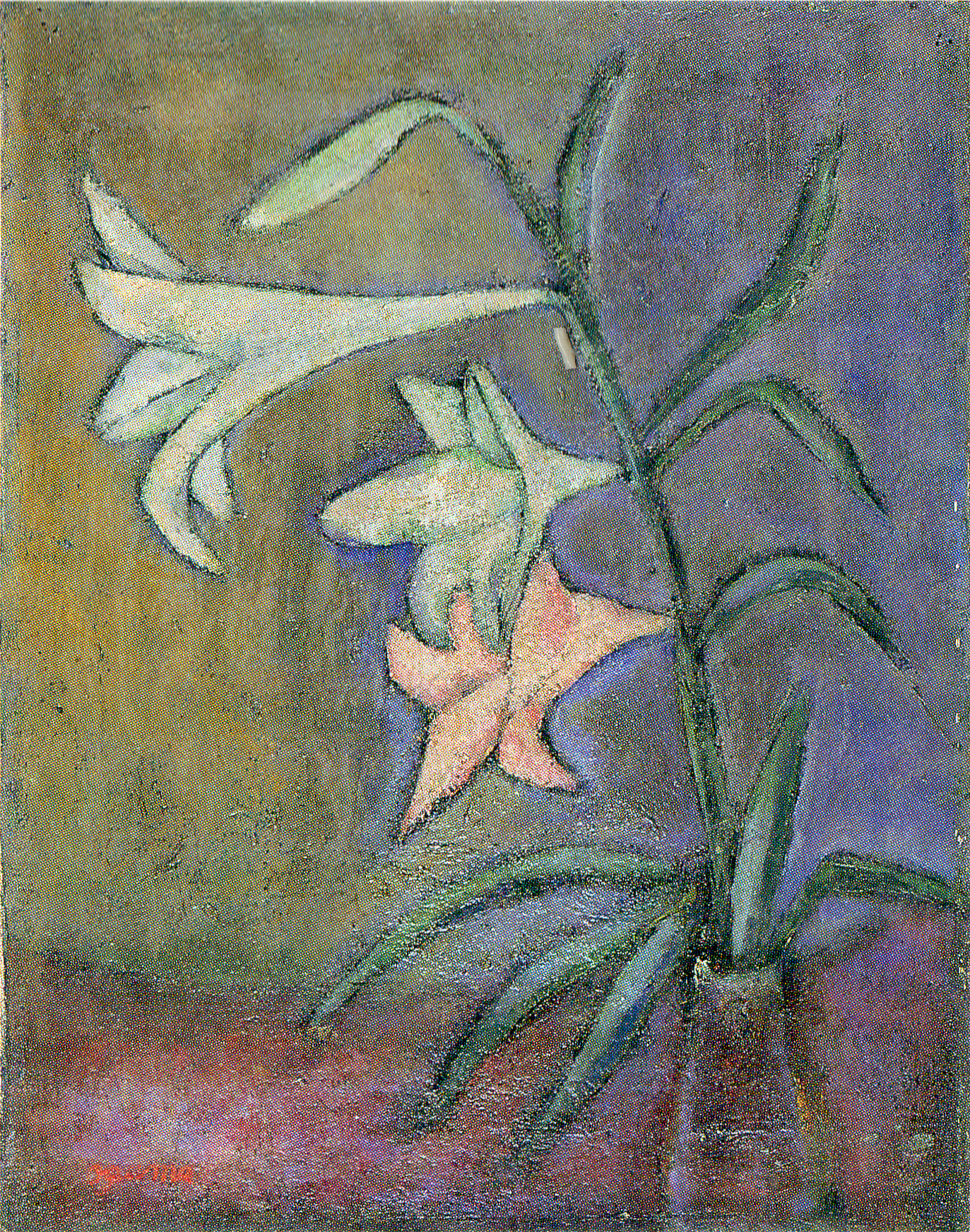
Flowers of Lilies (unknown date)

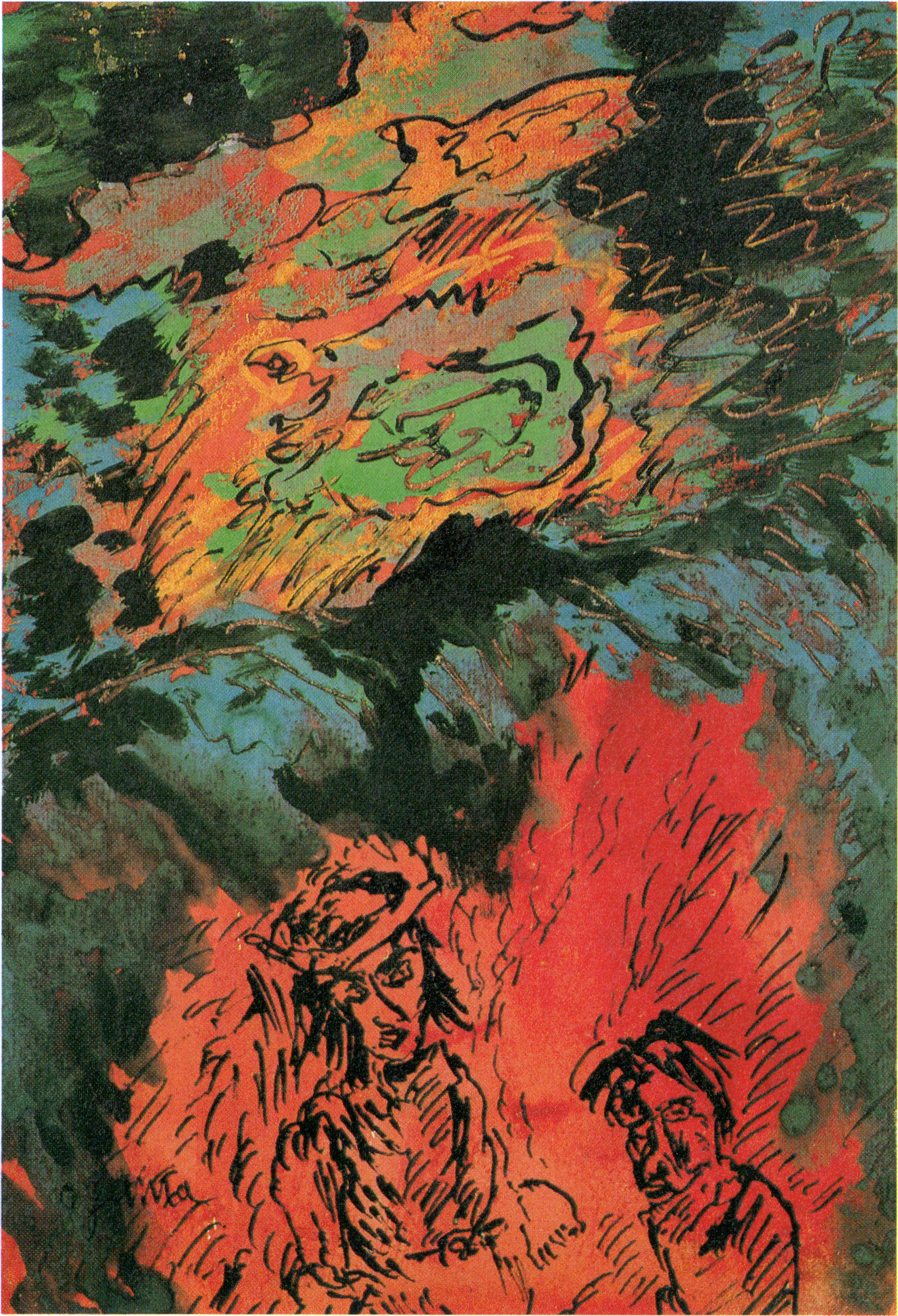
Figures (unknown date)

== Selected drawings ==
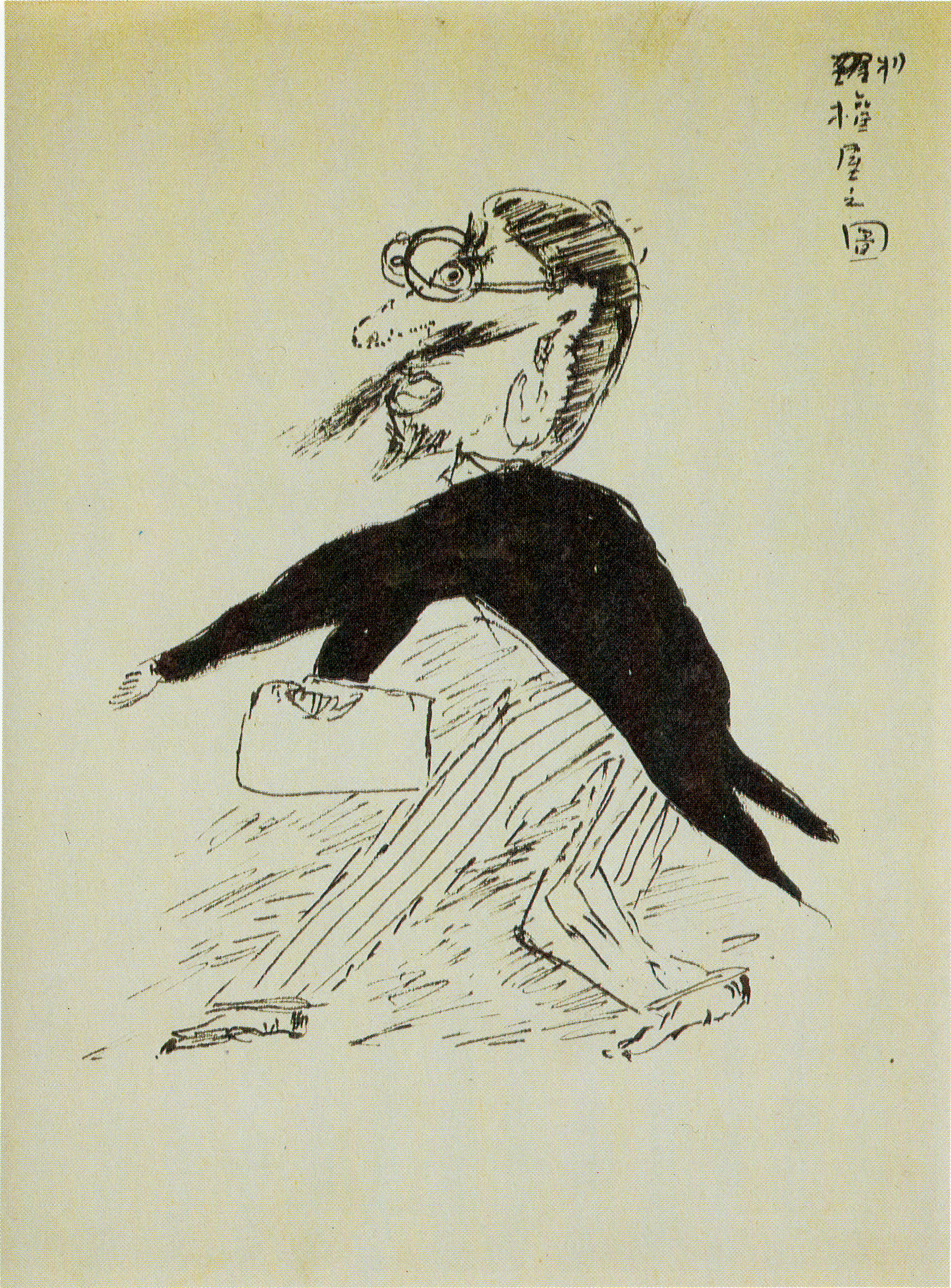
A Spoilsman (unknown date)

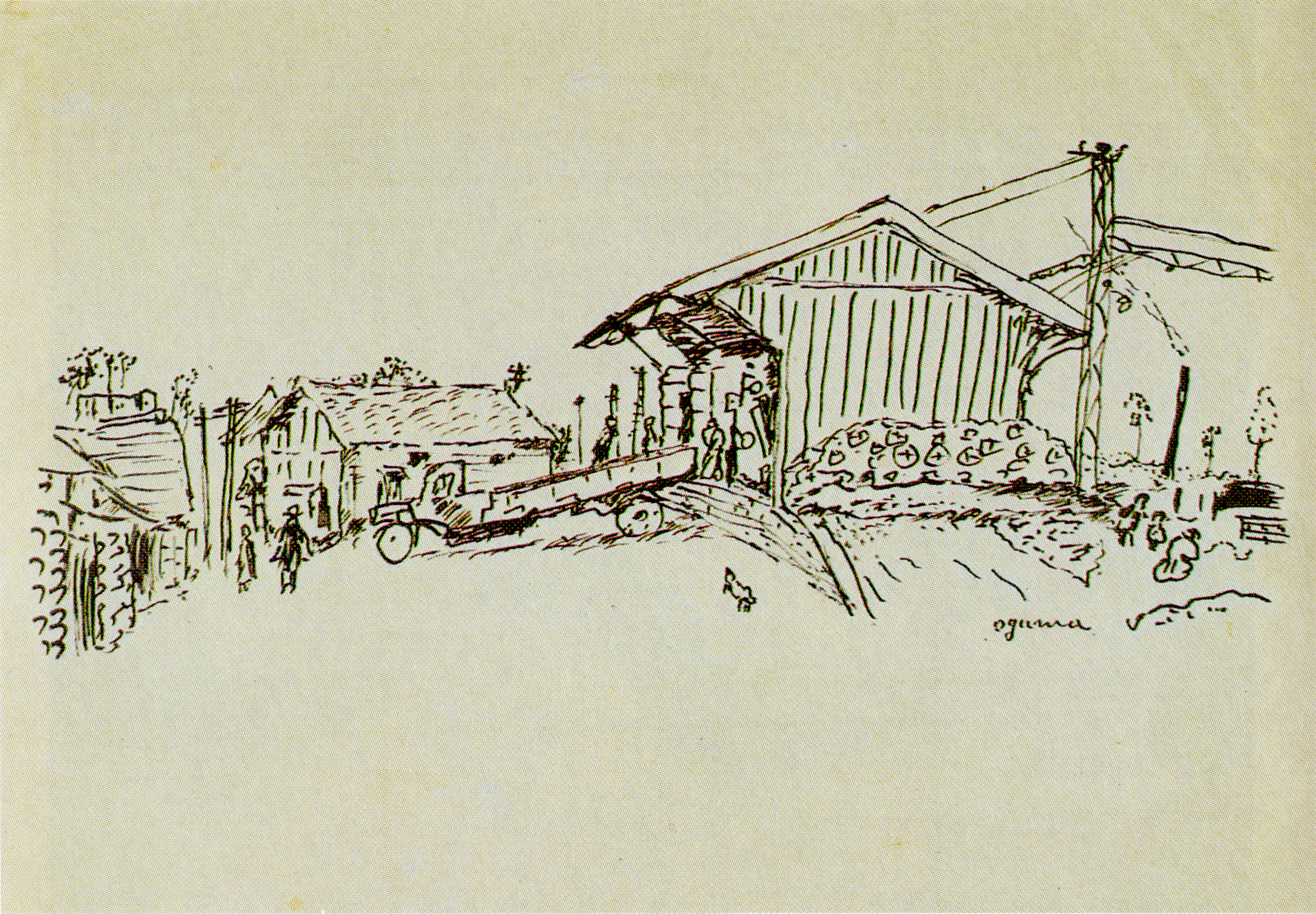
The Freight House in Ikebukuro Station (unknown date)
