= Kansuke Yamamoto: Conveyor of the Impossible =

Kansuke Yamamoto: Conveyor of the Impossible was a 2001 retrospective exhibition on the work of the Japanese photographer and poet Kansuke Yamamoto, held at Tokyo Station Gallery from 22 August to 24 September 2001. It was organized by the East Japan Railway Culture Foundation and East Japan Railway Company. The exhibition presented around 200 photographs, centered on recently rediscovered original prints, together with around 100 related materials, including drawings and issues of the Surrealist poetry magazine Yoru no Funsui.

== Exhibition ==
The catalogue greeting described Yamamoto as an early figure in Surrealist photography in Japan and stated that the exhibition would present his work through photographs, drawings, and documentary materials. It also summarized his activities in the Independent Photography Research Association, the magazine Yoru no Funsui, and the group Nagoya Photo Avant-Garde. The acknowledgements section credited, among others, John Solt, Ryūichi Kaneko, Nagoya City Art Museum, and members of Yamamoto's family for assistance in realizing the exhibition.

== Selected works ==
Works included in the catalogue include:

- The Developing Thought of a Human... Mist and Bedroom and (1932)
- Buddhist Temple's Birdcage (1940)
- Sleepy Sea (1953)
- My Thin-aired Room (1956)

== Catalogue ==
The accompanying catalogue, Yamamoto Kansuke: Conveyor of the Impossible, was edited by Toshio Yamamoto, Takeo Inada, and Haruko Tanaka under the supervision of John Solt and Ryūichi Kaneko, and was published in 2001 by the East Japan Railway Culture Foundation. Library records give its pagination as 237 and 79 pages and note the inclusion of English text.

In addition to an opening greeting and acknowledgements, the volume included Ryūichi Kaneko's essay "Yamamoto Kansuke's Position: Toward a Re-reading of Modern Japanese Photography" (pp. 8–17) and John Solt's "Perception, Misperception, Nonperception" (pp. 19–67). It also contained a chronology of Yamamoto's life and work compiled by Toshio Yamamoto (pp. 198–227) and a checklist of works (pp. 228–237).

Kaneko wrote that research undertaken for the exhibition indicated that Yamamoto's collage The Developing Thought of a Human... Mist and Bedroom and was probably made in 1932. He described the finding as important for considering the development of modern photographic expression in Japan during the 1930s. Solt's essay compares Surrealism in France and Japan and discusses Yamamoto's work in that context. It also describes the wartime police scrutiny of Japanese Surrealists and the suppression of Yoru no Funsui. Solt also described the catalogue as Yamamoto's first book.

The chronology records that the catalogue was issued in conjunction with the Tokyo Station Gallery exhibition and notes that a special edition of sixteen copies was also published privately by Toshio Yamamoto.

== Reception ==
An advance feature by Taylor Mignon, "A 'subversive' finally brought in from the cold", appeared in The Japan Times on 15 August 2001, shortly before the exhibition opened.

Photography critic Kōtarō Iizawa later discussed the exhibition in his 2004 book Me kara me e: Shashinten o aruku 2001–2003. He wrote that, before seeing the exhibition, he had known Yamamoto mainly as one of the founding members of Nagoya Photo Avant-Garde. The exhibition surprised him with the range of Yamamoto's work, including more than 200 works centered on photographs.

In a later English-language essay on Yamamoto, Eiko Aoki wrote that the exhibition was seen by 9,000 visitors. A contributor note in the catalogue states that John Solt's efforts to bring Yamamoto's photographic work to the attention of Tokyo Station Gallery's curators helped lead to the exhibition.

== See also ==
- Kansuke Yamamoto (artist)
- Yoru no Funsui
- Nagoya Photo Avant-Garde
- Tokyo Station Gallery
