= VOU (magazine) =

Japanese avant-garde poetry magazine (1935-1978)

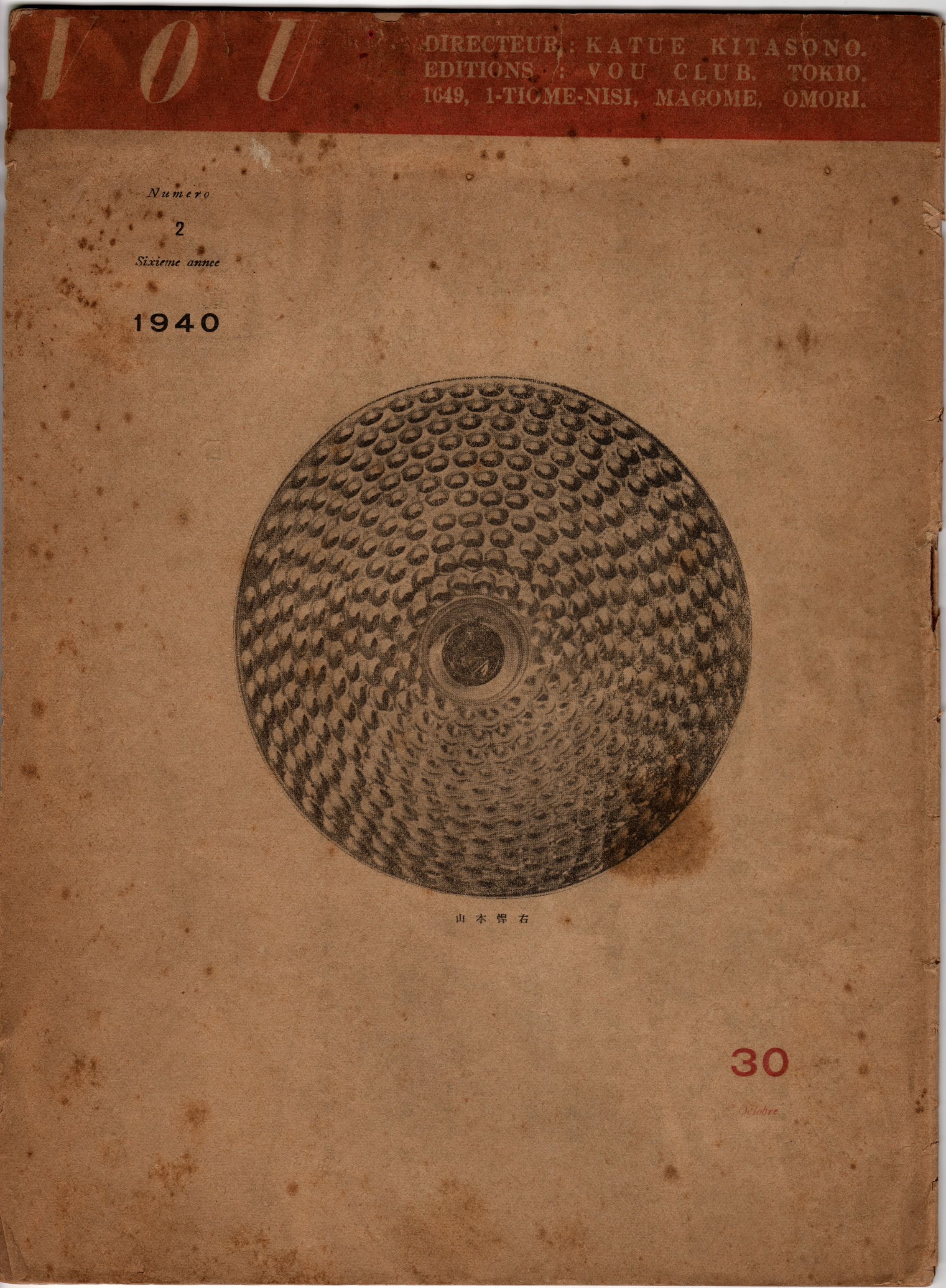
- VOU (vol. 30); cover photograph by Kansuke Yamamoto.
- Native name: ヴァウ
- Editor: Katsue Kitasono
- Founder: Katsue Kitasono
- First issue: July 1935
- Final issue: June 1978
- Country: Japan
- Based in: Japan
- Language: Japanese

VOU (ヴァウ) was a Japanese avant-garde poetry magazine and the journal of the VOU Club, an avant-garde poetry circle founded in July 1935 by Katsue Kitasono, Shūzō Iwamoto, and others. Kitasono edited the magazine and worked on its graphic design.

The magazine published 30 issues by October 1940. It was then renamed Shingijutsu (新技術), which appeared from December 1940 to September 1942. After the war, it was revived in December 1946, retitled CENDRE (サンドル) in 1948, and resumed the title VOU in October 1949. It ceased publication in June 1978 with cumulative issue no. 160, following Kitasono's death.

== History ==
VOU grew out of Kitasono's involvement with modernist poetry and the European avant-garde. A Los Angeles County Museum of Art essay states that Dada and Surrealism informed the founding of the VOU Club and its journal in 1935, and that the word VOU was intended as an "empty" word whose meaning would be defined by a changing group of poets, artists, composers, and architects.

According to the Nipponica encyclopedia entry, the magazine changed its title to Shingijutsu under the influence of the wartime nationalist climate and published seven issues under that name. It resumed after the war, briefly used the title CENDRE, and returned to VOU in 1949.

== VOU Club and contributors ==
The VOU Club (ヴァウクラブ) used VOU as its journal. Nipponica describes the magazine as a place for theories of abstraction and methodological experiments, and as part of a broader movement across poetry, music, architecture, and crafts.

The magazine published work by members of the circle in several media. In addition to poems, it carried photographs and essays on art, music, and film. Participants named in Japanese reference works include Saburō Kuroda (黒田三郎), Kōichi Kihara (木原孝一), Kikuo Takano (高野喜久雄), and Kazuko Shiraishi (白石かずこ).

The poet-photographer Kansuke Yamamoto was associated with the VOU circle. Eiko Aoki writes that Yamamoto was a member of the VOU Club from 1939 to 1978, except during the Pacific War years, and that he contributed poetry and artwork to VOU.

== Design and visual poetry ==
LACMA describes Kitasono as an editor and graphic designer of VOU and notes that the magazine varied in format rather than following a strict grid. The museum's exhibition text also links Kitasono's later Plastic Poetry to photographs made by members of the VOU group.

== Reception ==
Japanese reference works describe VOU as a representative journal of the avant-garde poetry movement and state that it gained international recognition. LACMA's presentation of Kitasono's work also treats VOU as part of his activity as a poet, editor, and designer.

== Bibliography ==
- Solt, John (2010-12-01). 北園克衛の詩と詩学: 意味のタペストリーを細断する [Katsue Kitasono's Poetry and Poetics: Shredding the Tapestry of Meaning] (in Japanese). 監訳：Tetsuya Taguchi (田口哲也). Tokyo: 思潮社. ISBN 978-4-7837-1659-4.

== See also ==
- Yoru no Funsui
- Surrealism in Japan
- Japanese poetry
- Concrete poetry
- Visual poetry
