= Tokyo Station Gallery =

Art museum in Tokyo, Japan

- 東京ステーションギャラリー
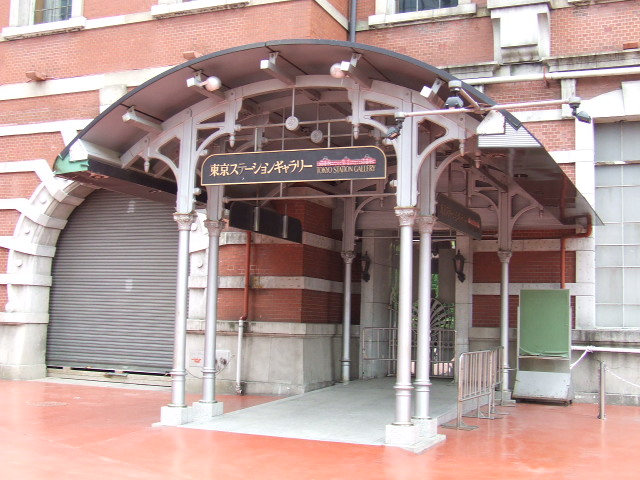
- Entrance pavilion of the gallery
- Established: 1988
- Location: Tokyo Station Marunouchi Building, Marunouchi, Chiyoda, Tokyo, Japan
- Type: Art museum
- Owner: East Japan Railway Culture Foundation
- Public transit access: Tokyo Station
- Website: Official website

Tokyo Station Gallery (Japanese: 東京ステーションギャラリー, Tōkyō Sutēshon Gyararī) is an art museum in Marunouchi, Chiyoda, Tokyo, Japan. Located within Tokyo Station's Marunouchi building, it opened in 1988 and occupies part of the red-brick station complex designed by Tatsuno Kingo. The museum is especially known for exhibition rooms that expose the station's original structural brick and steel frame, and it is listed as a registered museum in Japan.

== History ==
The gallery opened in 1988 in the Marunouchi station building, with the aim of making Tokyo Station a place for culture as well as transit. It temporarily closed in 2006 during the preservation and restoration of the station building and reopened in autumn 2012 after six and a half years. According to later museum overviews, the gallery staged 105 exhibitions and received about 2.35 million visitors during its first eighteen years of operation.

== Building and programme ==
The present gallery occupies the North Dome area of Tokyo Station's Marunouchi building. Visitors enter on the first floor and move through exhibition rooms on the second and third floors. The gallery was originally located at the station's central entrance and moved to its current location when it reopened in 2012. In the present galleries, structural brick, steel framing, and other elements of the original station building are deliberately left visible. A corridor display introduces the history of the Marunouchi building through models, photographs, recovered construction materials, and reconstructed ceiling reliefs.

The museum presents its activities through three broad strands: the reappraisal of modern art, encounters with railways, architecture and design, and exhibitions introducing contemporary art.

== Exhibitions ==
Tokyo Station Gallery has mounted both art-historical retrospectives and thematic exhibitions. Early shows included the opening exhibition JR Art Exhibition in 1988, an exhibition on Shōji Ueda in 1993, and the retrospective Kansuke Yamamoto: Conveyor of the Impossible', a retrospective devoted to the work of Kansuke Yamamoto, in 2001.

Since reopening, the museum's programme has continued to range widely. Selected exhibitions have included Alvar Aalto - Second Nature in 2019, Harry Potter: A History of Magic in 2021-22, organized with the British Library, and Yasui Nakaji 1903-1942: Photographs in 2024.

== See also ==
- Tokyo Station
