= Japan's Modern Divide: The Photographs of Hiroshi Hamaya and Kansuke Yamamoto =

2013 photography exhibition at the J. Paul Getty Museum

- art exhibition at the J. Paul Getty Museum (2013)
- Country: United States
- Location: J. Paul Getty Museum (Getty Center), Los Angeles, California
- Exhibited: Works by Kansuke Yamamoto and Hiroshi Hamaya
- Curator: Judith Keller; Amanda Maddox
- Organiser: J. Paul Getty Museum
- Website: www.getty.edu/art/exhibitions/japans_moderndivide/

Notes
- On view at the Getty Center from March 26 to August 25, 2013. The accompanying catalogue was published by the J. Paul Getty Museum in 2013 (ISBN 978-1-60606-132-9).

Japan's Modern Divide (full title Japan's Modern Divide: The Photographs of Hiroshi Hamaya and Kansuke Yamamoto) was a 2013 photography exhibition at the J. Paul Getty Museum (Getty Center, Los Angeles) from March 26 to August 25, 2013, with an accompanying catalogue published by the J. Paul Getty Museum. Curated by Judith Keller and Amanda Maddox, the exhibition presented the work of Hiroshi Hamaya and Kansuke Yamamoto. The Getty described Hamaya's approach as documentary and Yamamoto's as avant-garde, and contrasted their different responses to modern Japanese life.

== Background and concept ==
The J. Paul Getty Museum described Hamaya and Yamamoto as representing different paths in Japanese photography. Hamaya pursued documentary photography, while Yamamoto favored avant-garde forms of expression.

Eiko Aoki wrote that Japanese photography shifted from pictorialism to New Photography (Shinkō shashin), which then developed in two directions: documentary photography and photojournalism focused on social realism, and experimental avant-garde practices strongly influenced by Western Surrealism. Aoki also wrote that Japanese curators would probably not have paired Hamaya and Yamamoto because artists and their works tended to be treated within genre categories. The Getty stated that the photographers' different responses to modernity reflected divergent views among Japanese people.

== Exhibition ==
Japan's Modern Divide: The Photographs of Hiroshi Hamaya and Kansuke Yamamoto was presented at the J. Paul Getty Museum from March 26 to August 25, 2013. The exhibition was curated by Judith Keller, senior curator of photographs, and Amanda Maddox, assistant curator of photographs.

The Getty organized related programs during the exhibition, including gallery talks led by Keller and Maddox. It also presented the six-part film series In Tokyo, which accompanied the exhibition and examined modern life in Japan during the careers of the two photographers.

== Catalogue ==
The exhibition was accompanied by an illustrated catalogue published by the J. Paul Getty Museum in Los Angeles in 2013. Library records describe the volume as 224 pages, chiefly illustrated, and 29 cm in height. Its ISBN is 978-1-60606-132-9. The catalogue was edited by Judith Keller and Amanda Maddox.

The contents begin with Kōtarō Iizawa's "Innovation in the 1930s: The Early Works of Hiroshi Hamaya and Kansuke Yamamoto." Essays by Jonathan M. Reynolds and Keller on Hiroshi Hamaya are followed by plates 1–50 devoted to Hamaya. Plates 51–102 are devoted to Kansuke Yamamoto. They are followed by Ryūichi Kaneko's "The Position of Kansuke Yamamoto: Reexamining Japan's Modern Photography," "Five Poems by Kansuke Yamamoto" translated by John Solt, and Amanda Maddox's "Disobedient Spirit: Kansuke Yamamoto and His Engagement with Surrealism." The volume also includes selected chronologies of Hamaya and Yamamoto.

== Exhibition contents ==
=== Hiroshi Hamaya ===
The Getty described Hiroshi Hamaya as a photographer who pursued documentary work. It noted that between the international Depression and World War II he began documenting regional traditions and social issues, primarily along the Sea of Japan coast.

The Getty's page on Hamaya quotes his 1957 book Ura Nihon (Japan's Back Coast) on the physical labor involved in obtaining fish and rice in the region. The museum states that Hamaya photographed the 1960 demonstrations against the renewal of the U.S.-Japan Security Treaty, and that the photographs were published individually and in the paperback Ikari to kanashimi no kiroku (A Chronicle of Grief and Anger).

The page also notes that Hamaya made portraits for publication, later compiling a selection of them in Japanese Scholars and Artists (1983). He also produced genre studies featuring his wife, Asa Hamaya, and after her death prepared a memorial portfolio titled Calendar Days of Asa Hamaya. The page quotes Hamaya's 1982 essay "My Fifty Years of Photography," in which he described a three-year, four-month walking tour undertaken to observe nature in Japan.

=== Kansuke Yamamoto ===
The Getty stated that Kansuke Yamamoto drew inspiration from European Surrealism and produced photographs, poems, and other works associated with Japan's avant-garde movement.

The museum's Yamamoto profile states that his practice drew on Surrealism's interest in the unconscious, chance, and unexpected juxtapositions, and that he combined European-inspired Surrealist imagery with Japanese motifs and concerns. It notes that Yamamoto wrote poems and made collages alongside photography and produced the journal Yoru no Funsui in 1938 and 1939, featuring his poems, texts, drawings, and photographs. According to the Getty, Yamamoto ceased publishing the journal after the Tokkō expressed concern about its contents.

The Getty profile notes that from the late 1940s to the early 1960s Yamamoto experimented with color photography, combination printing, photograms, and sculpture. For his later work, the museum states that he continued to use art for criticism, dialogue, and rebellion, producing works that protested war, promoted liberty, and responded to current events.

In the catalogue, Maddox discusses Sleepy Sea (1953) in relation to René Magritte's The Reckless Sleeper (1928).

== Reception ==
In a review for the Los Angeles Times, Leah Ollman described the exhibition as a compare-and-contrast presentation of the two photographers and discussed Yamamoto's Surrealist work alongside Hamaya's documentary photography.

A 2013 NPR preview described the contrast between Hamaya's documentary work and Yamamoto's avant-garde practice, which it associated with French Surrealism.

In coverage for PBS SoCal, Meher McArthur called the exhibition a "rare opportunity" to see photographs by Hamaya and Yamamoto.

In Trans-Asia Photography Review, Eiko Aoki described Japan's Modern Divide as a "groundbreaking" exhibition.

Getty curator Judith Keller said in a 2013 NPR interview that "so little was known in English about either one of these photographers" before the exhibition.

A review in Library Journal described the photographers as "rarely seen on this side of the Pacific" and said that their work was "best appreciated by connoisseurs of 20th-century photography."
